= List of Bengali-language authors (chronological) =

Bengali literature বাংলা সাহিত্য
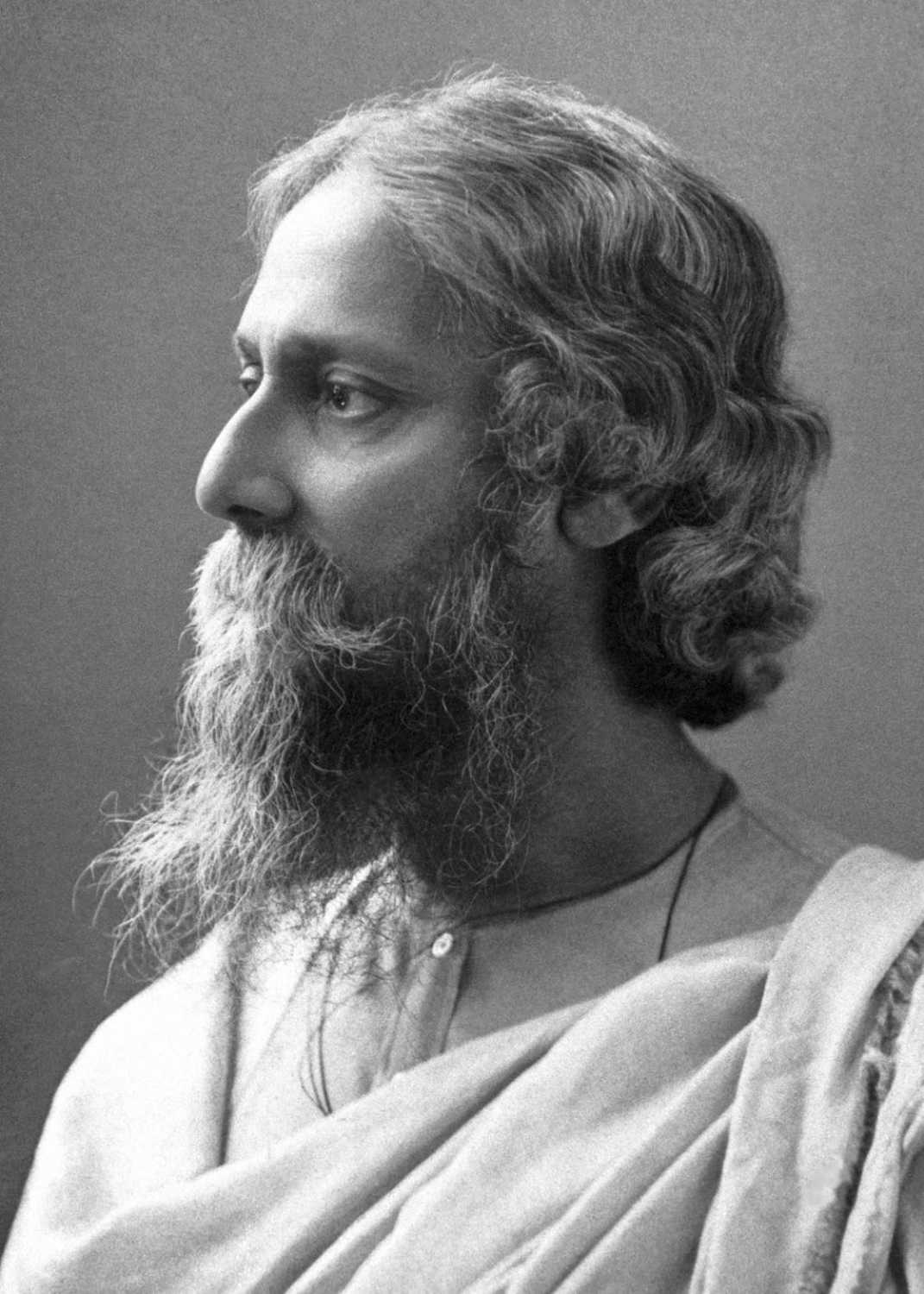
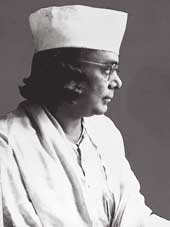
- (clockwise from top to bottom :); The oldest bengali script 'The charyapada' (top), Kazi Nazrul Islam (Bottom right), Rabindranath Tagore (Bottom left).

Bengali literature
- By category Bengali language

Bengali language authors
- Chronological list – Alphabetic List

Bengali writers
- Writers – Novelists – Poets

Forms
- Novel – Poetry – Science Fiction

Institutions and awards
- Literary Institutions; Literary Prizes

This is a chronological list of Bengali-language authors (regardless of nationality or religion), by the order of their year of birth. Alphabetical order is used only when chronological order cannot be ascertained.

The list also marks the winners of major international and national awards:

- Nobel Prize winners are marked with
- Ramon Magsaysay Award winners are marked with:
- Bharat Ratna winners are marked with:
- Padma Vibhushan winners are marked with:
- Padma Bhushan winners are marked with:
- Padma Shri winners are marked with:
- Independence Day Award winners are marked with:
- Ekushey Padak winners are marked with:
- Banga-Vibhushan winners are marked with:

For an alphabetic listing of Bengali language authors please refer to alphabetic list of Bengali language authors.

== Ancient age ==
- Khana (8th—12th century)
- Aryadev (9th century)
- Bhusukupa (9th century)
- Dhendhanpa (9th century)
- Dombipa (9th century)
- Kahnapa (9th century)
- Kukkuripa (9th century)
- Luipa (9th century)
- Minapa (9th century)
- Sarhapa (9th century)
- Shabarpa (9th century)
- Sandhyakar Nandi(c. 1084–1155 CE)

== Middle age ==
- Boru Chandidas (1339-1399)
- Ramai Pandit (10th century)
- Vidyapati (1352-1448)
- Nur Qutb Alam (14th century)
- Shah Muhammad Saghir (14th century)
- Bipradas Pipilai (15th century)
- Vijay Gupta (15th century)
- Zainuddin (15th century)
- Muzammil (15th century)
- Maladhar Basu (15th century)
- Krittibas Ojha (1381 — 1461)
- Krishnadasa Kaviraja (1528 – 1615/20)
- Chandrabati (16th century)
- Dawlat Wazir Bahram Khan (16th century)
- Dom Antonio (16th century)
- Kashiram Das (16th century)
- Dwija Madhab (16th century)
- Shrikar Nandi (16th century)
- Jayananda (16th century)
- Donagazi (16th century)
- Mukundaram Chakrabarti (1547-Early 1600s)
- Syed Sultan (1550–1648)
- Alaol (1606–1680)
- Afzal Ali (17th century)
- Ketakadas Kshemananda (17th century)
- Abdul Hakim (17th century)
- Daulat Quazi (17th century)
- Rupram Chakrabarty (17th century)
- Ghanaram Chakrabarty (c.1669)

== 18th century ==
- Fakir Garibullah (1680-1770)
- Heyat Mahmud (1693–1760)
- Radhamohana Thakura (1697-1778)
- Rameswar Bhattacharya (c.1710-1780)
- Bharatchandra Ray (1712–1760)
- Muhammad Muqim (18th Century)
- Jayananda and Lochan Das (18th Century)
- Abdul Matin (18th Century)
- I'tisam-ud-Din (1730-1800)
- Ramprasad Sen (1720–1781)
- Muhammad Mohsin (1732-1812)
- Shah Nuri Bengali (d.1785)
- Nidhu Babu (1741-1839)
- Rahimunnessa (1763–1800)
- Kamalakanta Bhattacharya (1769-1821)
- Ramram Basu (1751–1813)

== 19th century ==
- Raja Ram Mohan Roy (1772-1833)
- Rassundari Devi (1810-1899)
- Ishwar Chandra Gupta (1812–1859)
- Peary Chand Mitra (1814–1882)
- Debendranath Tagore (1817-1905)
- Ishwar Chandra Vidyasagar (1820–1891)
- Akshay Kumar Datta (1820-1886)
- Ramnarayan Tarkaratna (1822-1886)
- Lal Behari Dey (1824–1892)
- Michael Madhusudan Dutt (1824–1873)
- Rajnarayan Basu (1826–1892)
- Dinabandhu Mitra (1829–1873)
- Muhammad Naimuddin (1832-1907)
- Sanjib Chandra Chattopadhyay (1834–1889)
- Nassakh (1834-1889)
- Nawab Faizunnesa (1834-1903)
- Biharilal Chakraborty (1835-1894)
- Girish Chandra Sen (1835/1836-1910)
- Bankim Chandra Chattopadhyay (1838–1894)
- Hemchandra Bandyopadhyay (1838-1903)
- Keshub Chandra Sen (1838-1884)
- Kaliprasanna Singha (1840–1870)
- Dwijendranath Tagore (1840-1926)
- Girish Chandra Ghosh (1844–1912)
- Akshay Chandra Sarkar (1846-1917)
- Mir Mosharraf Hossain (1847–1912)
- Nabinchandra Sen (1847–1909)
- Troilokyanath Mukhopadhyay (1847–1919)
- Romesh Chunder Dutt (1848–1909)
- Jyotirindranath Tagore (1849–1925)
- Hara Prasad Shastri (1853–1931)
- Amrita Lal Basu (1853-1929)
- Hason Raja (1854–1922)
- Gobindachandra Das (1855-1918)
- Swarnakumari Devi (1855/56-1932)
- Ashwini Kumar Dutta (1856-1923)
- Prasannamoyee Devi (1856–1939)
- Toru Dutt (1856-1877)
- Kaykobad (1857-1951)
- Jagdish Chandra Bose (1858–1937)
- Kadambari Devi (1859-1884)
- Sheikh Abdur Rahim (1859–1931)
- Akkhoykumar Boral (1860–1919)
- Mohammad Mozammel Huq (1860-1933)
- Jaladhar Sen (1860–1939)
- Rabindranath Tagore (1861–1941)
- Akshay Kumar Maitreya (1861-1930)
- Dwijendralal Ray (1863–1913)
- Upendrakishore Ray Chowdhury (1863–1915)
- Swami Vivekananda (1863–1902)
- Ashutosh Mukherjee (1864–1924)
- Kamini Roy (1864–1933)
- Azizunnessa Khatun (1864-1940)
- Ramendra Sundar Tribedi (1864–1919)
- Rajanikanta Sen (1865–1910)
- Dinesh Chandra Sen (1866–1939)
- Gaganendranath Tagore (1867–1938)
- Pramatha Chowdhury (1868–1946)
- Shaikh Jamiruddin (1870-1937)
- Khairunnesa Khatun (1870–1912)
- Atulchandra Sen (1870-1948)
- Atul Prasad Sen (1871-1934)
- Abanindranath Tagore (1871–1951)
- Abdul Karim Sahitya Bisharad (1871–1953)
- Priyamvada Devi (1871–1935)
- Ekramuddin Ahmad (1872–1940)
- Provatkumar Mukhopadhyay (1873–1932)
- Kumudini Basu (1873–1942)
- Sarat Chandra Chattopadhyay (1876–1938)
- Haridas Siddhanta Bagish (1876-1961)
- Dakshinaranjan Mitra Majumder (1877–1957)
- Jatindramohan Bagchi (1878–1948)
- Mukunda Das (1878-1934)
- Ismail Hossain Shiraji (1880–1931)
- Rajshekhar Bose (1880–1960)
- Begum Rokeya (1880-1932)
- Syed Emdad Ali (1880–1956)
- Qazi Imdadul Haq (1882–1926)
- Satyendranath Dutta (1882–1922)
- Sheikh Fazlul Karim (1882–1936)
- Anurupa Debi (1882-1958)
- Hemendrakumar Roy (1883–1963)
- Kumud Ranjan Mullick (1883–1970)
- Nirupama Devi (1883–1951)
- Atulchandra Gupta (1884-1961)
- Muhammad Shahidullah (1885–1969)
- Jatindra Mohan Dutta (1894–1975)
- Rakhaldas Bandyopadhyay (1885–1930)
- Nabinkali Devi (fl. 1886)
- Jagadish Gupta (1886–1957)
- Sukumar Ray (1887–1923)
- Girindrasekhar Bose (1887-1953)
- Eyakub Ali Chowdhury (1888–1940)
- Mohitolal Majumdar (1888–1952)
- Mohammad Nasiruddin (1888-1994)
- Kalidas Roy (1889–1975)
- Mohammad Lutfur Rahman (1889–1936)
- Suniti Kumar Chatterji (1890–1970)
- S. Wajid Ali (1890–1951)
- Premankur Atorthy (1890–1964)
- Sachin Sengupta (1891–1961)
- Sahadat Hussain (1893–1953)
- Bibhuti Bhushan Bandopadhyay (1894–1950)
- Bibhutibhushan Mukhopadhyay (1894–1987)
- DP Mukerji (1894-1961)
- Kazi Abdul Wadud (1894-1970)
- Satyendra Nath Bose (1894-1974)
- Golam Mostofa (1897–1964)
- Nirad C. Chaudhuri (1897–1999)
- Qazi Motahar Hossain (1897–1981)
- Abul Mansur Ahmed (1898–1979)
- Mahbubul Alam (1898–1981)
- Mohammad Barkatullah (1898–1974)
- Tarashankar Bandopadhyaya (1898–1971)
- Jibanananda Das (1899–1954)
- Sharadindu Bandyopadhyay (1899–1970)
- Kazi Nazrul Islam (1899–1976)
- Balai Chand Mukhopadhyay (1899–1979)

== Early 20th century ==
- Sajanikanta Das (1900–1962)
- Aroj Ali Matubbar (1900–1985)
- Sukumar Sen (1900–1992)
- Amiya Chakravarty (1901–1986)
- Pramathanath Bishi (1901-1985)
- Sudhindranath Dutta (1901–1960)
- Saumyendranath Tagore (1901-1974)
- Manoj Basu (1901–1987)
- Abul Fazal (1903–1983)
- Benojir Ahmed (1903–1983)
- Achintyakumar Sengupta (1903–1976)
- Shibram Chakraborty (1903–1980)
- Jasimuddin (1903–1976)
- Motaher Hussain Chowdhury (1903–1956)
- Radharani Devi (1903-1989)
- Premendra Mitra (1904–1988)
- Syed Mujtaba Ali (1904–1974)
- Annada Shankar Ray (1904–2002)
- Atul Sur (1904-1999)
- Prabodh Kumar Sanyal (1905-1983)
- Abdul Quadir (1906–1984)
- Humayun Kabir (1906–1969)
- Satinath Bhaduri (1906–1965)
- Abu Sayeed Ayyub (1906 - 1982 )
- Bande Ali Mia (1907–1979)
- Satyen Sen (1907–1981)
- Manik Bandyopadhyay (1908-1956)
- Nurul Momen, Natyaguru (1908–1990)
- Buddhadeb Bosu (1908–1974)
- Dewan Mohammad Azraf (1908–1999)
- Gajendra Kumar Mitra (1908–1994)
- Leela Majumdar (1908–2007)
- Ashapoorna Devi (1909–1995)
- Bishnu Dey (1909–1982)
- Arun Mitra (1909–2000)
- Subodh Ghosh (1909–1980)
- Kalikananda Abadhut (1910-1978)
- Nihar Ranjan Gupta (1911–1986)
- Abujafar Shamsuddin (1911–1989)
- Manikuntala Sen (1911-1987)
- Begum Sufia Kamal (1911–1999)
- Jyotirindranath Nandi (1912–1982)
- Bimal Mitra (1912–1991)
- Dinesh Das (1913–1985)
- Adwaita Mallabarman (1914–1951)
- Kamal Kumar Majumdar (1914–1979)
- Maitreyi Devi (1914-1989)
- Protiva Bose (1915–2006)
- Narendranath Mitra (1916–1975)
- Samar Sen (1916–1987)
- Khudiram Das (1916–2002)
- Maniklal Sinha (1916-1994)
- Ahsan Habib (1917–1985)
- Akbar Hossain (1917–1981)
- Bijan Bhatacharya (1917–1978)
- Dinesh Chandra Chattopadhyay (1917–1995)
- Shawkat Osman (1917–1998)
- Amiya Bhūşhan Majumdār (1918–2001)
- Debiprasad Chattopadhyaya (1918-1993)
- Farrukh Ahmed (1918–1974)
- Narayan Gangopadhyay (1918–1970)
- Sarder Jayenuddin (1918–1986)
- Sikandar Abu Zafar (1919–1975)
- Abu Rushd (1919–2010)
- Subhas Mukhopadhyay (1919–2003)
- Radha Prasad Gupta (1920-2000)
- Ashutosh Mukhopadhyay (1920-1989)
- Nilima Ibrahim (1921–2002)
- Ahmed Sharif (1921–1999)
- Satyajit Ray (1921–1992)
- Prabhat Ranjan Sarkar (1921–1990)
- Bimal Kar (1921–2003)
- Ajit Gangopadhay (1921-1984)
- Ramapada Chowdhury (1922–2018)
- Syed Ali Ahsan (1922–2002)
- Syed Waliullah (1922–1971)
- Shaktipada Rajguru (1922–2014)
- Gour Kishore Ghosh (1923–2000)
- Samaresh Basu (1924–1988)
- Narayan Sanyal (1924–2005)
- Nirendranath Chakravarty (1924-2018)
- Tapas Sen (1924-2006)
- Badal Sarkar (1925–2011)
- Munier Chowdhury (1925–1971)
- Rashid Karim (1925–2011)
- Ritwik Ghatak (1925–1976)
- Shahed Ali (1925–2001)
- Narayan Debnath (1925-2022)
- Abu Ishaque (1926–2003)
- Romena Afaz (1926–2003)
- Mahasweta Devi (1926–2016)
- Mufazzal Haider Chaudhury (1926–1971)
- Shamsuddin Abul Kalam (1926–1997)
- Sukanta Bhattacharya (1926–1947)
- Manindra Gupta (1926–2018)
- Amitabha Chowdhury (1927-2015)
- Lokenath Bhattacharya (1927–2001)
- Mahbub Ul Alam Choudhury (1927–2007)
- Shahidullah Kaiser (1927–1971)
- Anwar Pasha (1928–1971)
- Abdur Rouf Choudhury (1929–1996)
- Jahanara Imam (1929–1994)
- M. R. Akhtar Mukul (1929–2004)
- Shamsur Rahman (1929–2006)
- Utpal Dutt (1929–1993)
- Abdullah-Al-Muti (1930–1998)
- Syed Mustafa Siraj (1930–2012)
- Moti Nandi (1931–2010)
- Sailen Ghosh (1931–2016)
- Kabita Sinha (1931–1999)
- Nimai Bhattacharya (1931–2020)
- Alauddin Al-Azad (1932–2006)
- Muhammad Mohar Ali (1932–2007) (King Faisal International Prize for Islamic Studies in 2000)
- Shankha Ghosh (1932–2021)
- Nikhil Sarkar (Sripantha) (1932–2004)
- Adrish Bardhan (1932–2019)
- Anil Bhowmik (1932-2008)
- Mani Shankar Mukherjee (1933-2026)
- Amartya Sen (born 1933)
- Anil Kumar Dutta (1933–2006)
- Sandipan Chattopadhyay (1933–2005)
- Samir Roychoudhury (1933–2016)
- Alokeranjan Dasgupta (1933–2020)
- Purnendu Patri (1933–1997)
- Shakti Chattopadhyay (1933–1995)
- Abdul Gaffar Choudhury (1934-2022)
- Atin Bandyopadhyay (1934-2019)
- Sudhir Chakravarti (1934–2020)
- Binoy Majumdar (1934–2006)
- Mohit Chattopadhyay (1934–2012)
- Sunil Gangopadhyay (1934–2012) (Padma Bhushan)
- Sanjib Chattopadhyay (born 1934)
- Prafulla Roy (1934–2025)
- Ajay Roy (1934-2008)
- Buddhadeb Guha (1935–2021)
- Zahir Raihan (1935–1972)
- Rabeya Khatun (1935–2021)
- Shahid Akhand (born 1935)
- Shirshendu Mukhopadhyay (born 1935)
- Syed Shamsul Haque (1935–2016)
- Abubakar Siddique (1936–2023)
- Al Mahmud (1936–2019)
- Amiya Kumar Bagchi (1936–2024)
- Bashir Al Helal (1936–2021)
- Dilara Hashim (1936–2022)
- Jatin Sarker (1936–2025)
- Razia Khan (1936–2011)
- Tarapada Roy (1936–2007)
- Sanjib Chattopadhyay (born 1936)
- Debesh Roy (1936–2020)
- Hosne Ara Shahed (1937–2022)
- Dilwar Khan (1937–2013)
- Tahrunessa Abdullah (born 1937)
- Makbula Manzoor (1938-2020)
- Nabaneeta Dev Sen (1938–2019)
- Ajit Roy (1938-2011)
- Malay Roy Choudhury (1939–2023)
- Abdullah Abu Sayeed (born 1939)
- Bani Basu (born 1939)
- Dibyendu Palit (1939–2019)
- Hasan Azizul Huq (1939–2021)
- Hasnat Abdul Hye (born 1939)
- Iffat Ara (born 1939)
- Rizia Rahman (1939–2019)
- Bipradash Barua (born 1940)
- Rahat Khan (1940–2020)
- Tridib Mitra (born 1940)
- Sasthipada Chattopadhyay (1941–2023)
- Sujan Dasgupta (1942-2023)
- Abdul Mannan Syed (1943–2010)
- Ahmed Sofa (1943–2006)
- Akhtaruzzaman Elias (1943–1997)
- Asad Chowdhury (1943–2023)
- Buddhadeb Bhattacharya (1944–2024)
- Samaresh Majumdar (1944–2023)
- Nirmalendu Goon (born 1945)
- Aveek Sarkar (born 1945)
- Abhijit Sen (writer) (born 1945)
- Prabir Ghosh (1945–2023)
- Subrata Barua (born 1946)
- Haripada Datta (born 1947)
- Humayun Azad (1947–2004)
- Taradas Bandyopadhyay (1947–2010)
- Selina Hossain (born 1947)
- Swapan Kumar Biswas (born 1947)
- Tapan Bandyopadhyay (born 1947)
- Nabarun Bhattacharya (1948–2014)
- Humayun Ahmed (1948–2012)
- Mohammad Nurul Huda (born 1949)

== Late 20th century ==
- Arunoday Saha (born 1948)
- Nrisingha Prasad Bhaduri (born 1950)
- Suchitra Bhattacharya (1950–2015)
- Anish Deb (1950–2021)
- Ekram Ali (born 1950)
- Manoranjan Byapari (born 1950)
- Abul Bashar (born 1951)
- Amar Mitra (born 1951)
- Swapnamoy Chakraborty (born 1951)
- Syed Manzoorul Islam (1951-2025)
- Pritish Nandy (1951-2025)
- Muhammed Zafar Iqbal (born 1952)
- Suresh Ranjan Basak (born 1952)
- Shahidul Zahir (1953 – 2008)
- Joy Goswami (born 1954)
- Khurshid Anwar (born 1954)
- Imdadul Haq Milan (born 1955)
- Anita Agnihotri (born 1956)
- Chitra Banerjee Divakaruni (born 1956)
- Anil Ghorai (born 1957)
- Ahsan Habib (cartoonist) (born 1957)
- Biswajit Ghosh (academic) (born 1958)
- Moinul Hassan (born 1958)
- Moinul Ahsan Saber (born 1958)
- Subodh Sarkar (born 1958)
- Salimullah Khan (born 1958)
- Tridib Kumar Chattopadhyay (born 1958)
- Chinmoy Guha (born 1958)
- Muhammad Samad (born 1958)
- Tarun Mandal (born 1959)
- Afsar Amed (1959 – 2018)
- Bishwajit Chowdhury (born 1960)
- Mallika Sengupta (1960–2011)
- Shahaduz Zaman (born 1960)
- Abhijit Banerjee (born 1961)
- Arundhati Roy (born 1961)
- Rabisankar Bal (1962–2017)
- Shaheen Akhtar (born 1962)
- Taslima Nasrin (born 1962)
- Prachet Gupta (born 1962)
- Amit Chaudhuri (born 1962)
- Samar Deb (born 1963)
- Sajjad Sharif (born 1963)
- Humayun Kabir Dhali (born 1964)
- Nasreen Jahan (born 1964)
- Anirvan Ghosh (born 1964)
- Aryanil Mukhopadhyay (born 1964)
- Anjan Bandyopadhyay (1965-2021)
- Chandril Bhattacharya (born 1965)
- Zakir Talukder (born 1965)
- Soumitra Biswas (born 1965)
- Rashid Askari (born 1965)
- Anisul Hoque (born 1965)
- Yashodhara Ray Chaudhuri (born 1965)
- Kallol Lahiri (born 1966)
- Tilottama Majumdar (born 1966)
- Jhumpa Lahiri (born 1967)
- Mohammad Nazim Uddin (born 1967)
- Tapan Bagchi (born 1968)
- Anish Das Apu (born 1969)
- Rimi B. Chatterjee (born 1969)
- Zia Haider Rahman (born 1969)
- Mostofa Kamal (born 1969)
- Avigyan Roychoudhury (born 1970)
- Neamat Imam (born 1971)
- Kazi Masum Akhtar (born 1971)
- Gautam Bhattacharya (born 1972)
- Mandakranta Sen (born 1972)
- Tokon Thakur (born 1972)
- Avijit Roy (1972-2015)
- Baby Halder (born 1973)
- Sourav Mukhopadhyay (born 1973)
- Shibabrata Barman (born 1973)
- Marzuk Russell (born 1973)
- Moniruddin Khan (born 1974)
- Sangeeta Bandyopadhyay (born 1974)
- Aditi Falguni (born 1974)
- Srijato (born 1975)
- Angshuman Kar (born 1975)
- Tahmima Anam (born 1975)
- Smaranjit Chakraborty (born 1976)
- Binod Ghoshal (born 1976)
- Subhro Bandopadhyay (born 1978)
- Samit Basu (born 1979)
- Saad Z. Hossain (born 1979)
- Sumankumar Dash (born 1982)
- Sadat Hossain (born 1984)
- Avik Dutta (born 1985)
- Anirban Bandyopadhyay (born 1986)
- Mimi Mondal (born 1988)
- Tathagata Bhattacharya (born 1992)
- Adiba Jaigirdar (born 1994)
- Aparesh Bandhopaddhaya
