= Bengali poetry =

Bengali-language poetry

Bengali literature বাংলা সাহিত্য
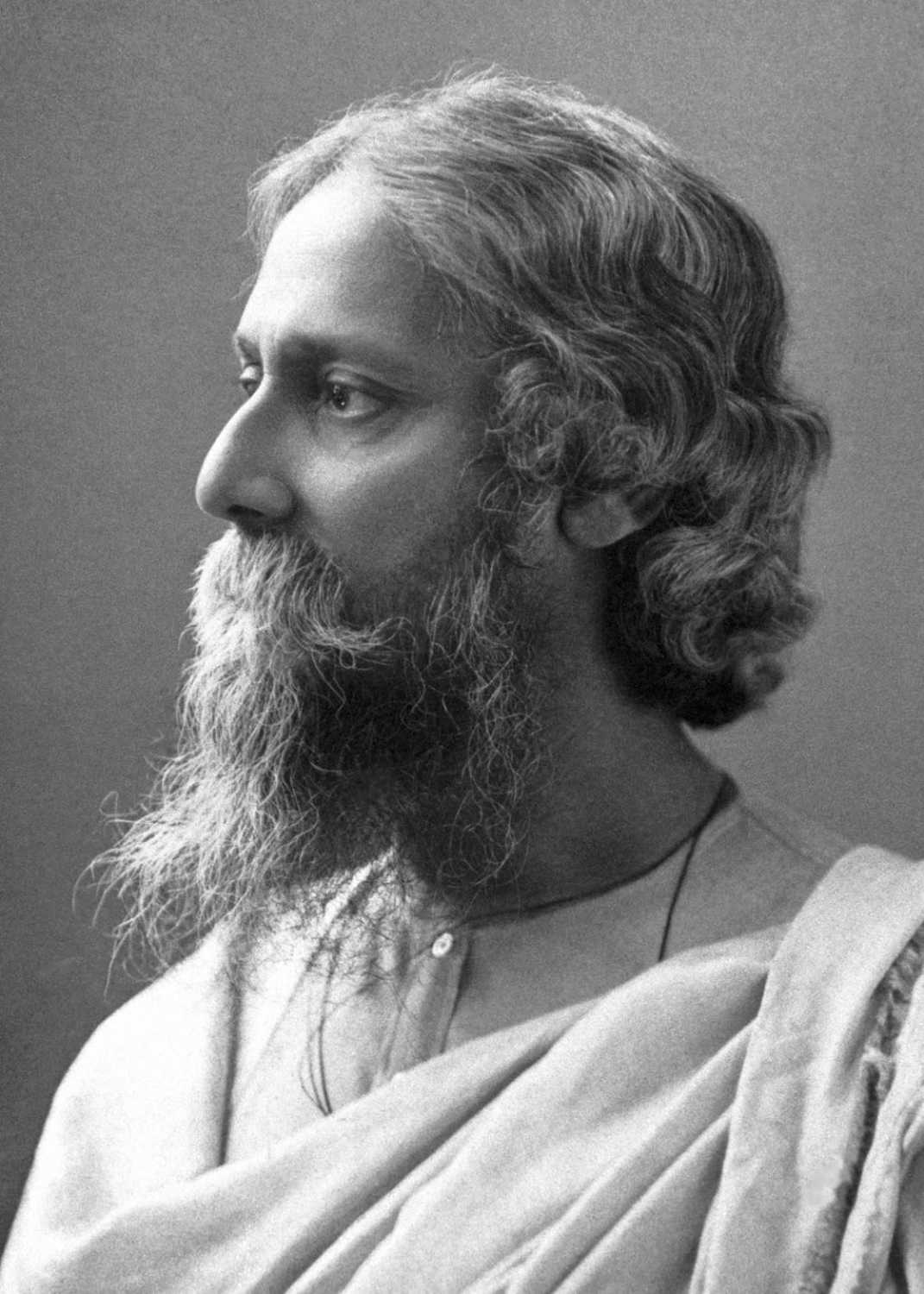
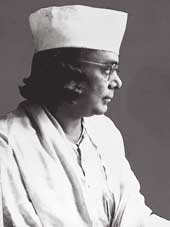
- (clockwise from top to bottom :); The oldest bengali script 'The charyapada' (top), Kazi Nazrul Islam (Bottom right), Rabindranath Tagore (Bottom left).

Bengali literature
- By category Bengali language

Bengali language authors
- Chronological list – Alphabetic List

Bengali writers
- Writers – Novelists – Poets

Forms
- Novel – Poetry – Science Fiction

Institutions and awards
- Literary Institutions; Literary Prizes

Bengali poetry is a rich tradition of poetry in the Bengali language and has many different forms. Originating in Bengal, the history of Bengali poetry underwent three successive stages of development: poetry of the early age (like Charyapad), the Medieval period and the age of modern poetry. All ages have seen different forms of poetry and poetical tradition. It reached the pinnacle during the Bengali Renaissance period although it has a rich tradition and has grown independent of the movement. Major Bengali Poets throughout the ages are Chandidas, Krittivas Ojha, Maladhar Basu, Bijay Gupta, Mukundaram Chakrabarti, Kashiram Das, Alaol, Syed Sultan, Ramprasad Sen, Michael Madhusudan Dutt, Nabinchandra Sen, Rabindranath Tagore, Dwijendralal Ray, Satyendranath Dutta, Kazi Nazrul Islam, Jibanananda Das, Jasimuddin, Sukanta Battacharya, Al Mahmud, Joy Goswami, Ahsan Habib, Samshur Rahman, Begum Sufia Kamal.

== Introduction ==
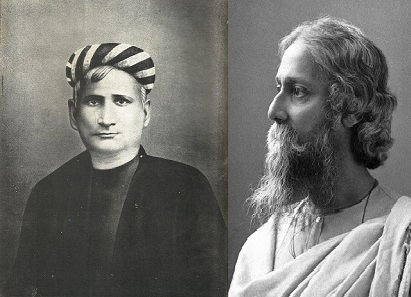
Bankim Chandra Chatterjee's poem Vande Mataram is the national song of India and Rabindranath Tagore's Jana Gana Mana is the National anthem of India, both poems were originally written in Bengali-language

Poetry in the colloquial dialect of Bengal first originated from Prakrit, and based upon local socio-cultural traditions. It was antagonistic towards Vedic rituals and laws as opposed to the sahajaya traditions of the poets themselves - who were mainly Buddhist sages.

The medieval period marked the introduction of puthis, which played an important role in Muslim life and brought much Persian and Arabic influence to the poetic lexicon. Shah Gharibullah was said to have initiated this puthi trend with his epic "Amir Hamza". Many jongonamas, puthis based on battles, were written during this time. Jongonamas were generally elegiac in tone. Works relating to Karbala were called marsiya (meaning 'grief' in Arabic) literature. Both janganama and marsiya literature first developed in Arabia and later Persia. Muslim Sufis and soldiers introduced this form of poetry in the Bengali language to the masses in Bengal and Arakan. Well-known poems of include Zainab's Chautisha by Sheikh Faizullah, Maqtul Husayn by Mohammad Khan and Qasim-er Lodai O Fatima-r Surotnama by Sherbaz. The works mixed Bengali folk poetry with Perso-Arabian stories and themes, and are considered an important part of the Muslim culture of Bengal.

== Ancient and medieval eras ==
Charyapada is the oldest poetry and literary specimen of Bengali language. It is also the oldest work in the neo-Indian Aryan language. The composers of these hymns, composed between the tenth and twelfth centuries AD, were easily Buddhist Siddhacharyas. The 24 major Charyapadas were by Lui Pa, Kukkuripa, Biruapa, Gundaripa, Chatilpa, Bhusuk Pa, Kahnpa, Kambalambarpa, Dombipa, Shantipa, Mahittapa, Veenapa, Sarhapa, Shabar Pa, Azdebpa, Dhenpana, Dankapa, Darikpa Dhampa, Tantripa, Laridombipa. 1200-1350 AD of Bengali literature has been marked as the "dark age of Bengali Literature." During this time Srikrishnakirtan was composed by Badu Chandidas. The other remarkable poets of Vaishnava literature of this era were Vidyapati, Jnandas, Govindadasa, Maladhar Basu, Yashoraj Khan, Chandkaji, Ramchandra Basu, Balram Das, Narhari Das, Vrindavan Das, Basudavas, Bansidas. Syed Sultan, Harahari Sarkar, Fateh Paramananda, Ghanshyam Das, Gayas Khan, Alaol, Deen Chandidas, Chandrashekhar, Haridas, Shivram, Karam Ali, Pir Muhammad, Hiramani, Bhavananda. The ancient Indian epics named Ramayana and Mahabharata were translated into Bengali language by Krittivas Ojha, Chandravati, Kashiram Das and Kavindra Parameshwar. Famous poets of Mangal Kavya are Kanahari Dutta, Narayan Dev, Chandrvati, Bijay Gupta, Bipradas Pipilai, Madhav Acharya, Mukundaram Chakrabarti, Ghanaram Chakraborty, Srishyam Pandit, Bharatchandra Ray Gunakar, Khemananda, Ketaka Das Khemananda, Dwij Madhav, Adi Rupram, Manik Ram, Mayur Bhatt, Khelaram, Rupram, Sitaram Das, Shyamj.

The 18th-century two brilliant Shakta bhakti court poets were Bharatchandra Ray and Ramprasad Sen.

== Modern poets (1800–present) ==
The poets who built the bridge between the Middle and Modern Ages is the poet of the Ages:Ishwar Chandra Gupta (1812–1859), he is also regarded as the Father of the Modern Bengali Language. Michael Madhusudan Dutt (1824–1873) broke the medieval paradigm and Bengali poetry entered free verse - he is especially popular for his Bengali sonnets. Biharilal Chakraborty (1835–1894) who was a romantic and lyric poet of European style also contributed to the shift.

Kabiguru Rabindranath Tagore (1861–1941) was arguably the most revolutionary poets of Bengali Literature. He contributed to every branch of Bengali Literature including poetry. He broke down the old custom of writing in "Sadhu" language in poetry and introduced an aspect of poetry which had more freedom to the poet. He composed over two-thousand songs - which are known as "Rabindra Sangeet" and they are popular in West Bengal and Bangladesh even today. His songs "Jana Gana Mana" and "Amar Sonar Bangla" are the National Anthems of India and Bangladesh respectively. His impact on Bengali Literature is so immense that all Bengali Literature during his lifetime is known as the "Rabindric Era", after his name. The contemporary poets of the Rabindric era were Satyendranath Dutta, Kamini Ray, Updendrakishore Raychowdhury, Sukumar Ray, Jatindra Mohan Bagchi among others. The death of Rabindranath Tagore is often considered to be the end of Classical Poetry and the start of Modern Poetry.

At the beginning of the twentieth century, there was a new change in Bengali style of poetry, with poets adopting an even liberal style of poetry, bringing an end to Bengali Romanticism. Poets such as Mohitlal Majumder, Kazi Nazrul Islam and Jatindranath Sengupta beginning contributed to this period. "Bidrohi Kavi" Kazi Nazrul Islam is considered to be the bridge between the Anti-Romantic Period and the Modern Period of Poetry. He had composed a vast oeuvre of poetry and songs – the latter of which are known as "Nazrul Geeti" which are sung even today. Nazrul is also the National Poet of Bangladesh. His poem "Bidrohi" had a big impact on the Indian Freedom Movement.

The death of Tagore led to the beginning of the Golden Age of Modern Poetry, which lasted from the 1940s to the 60s. Numerous poets left their profound impact on poetry in this era, such as: Amiya Chakraborty (1901–1966), Jibanananda Das (1899–1954), Buddhadeb Basu (1906–1964), Bishnu Dey (1909–1962), Sudhindranath Dutta (1901–1960), Sablu Shahabuddin (1957–1999). They were followed by the generation of Shakti Chattopadhyay (1933–1995), Sankha Ghosh (1932–2021), Tarapada Ray (1936–2007) Sunil Gangopadhyay (1935–2012) – known as Krittibas group of poets.The Krittibas magazine continued to launch new poets in later decades, including Prabal Kumar Basu.

Jasimuddin's work of Pastoral mood led him to be known as Palli Kabi. He was one of the major poets.

"Hungryalist movement" also emerged in Bengal that was consisted with new bunch of poets in Bengal, inducing Malay Roy Choudhury and Purusottam Kumar Debnath.

== Poets of West Bengal and Bangladesh ==
Following the Partition of India in 1947, Bengali poets were divided along nationalistic lines of India and Pakistan. West Bengal still had a great literary culture around it. Many Poets like Shakti Chattopadhyay, Binoy Majumdar, Samir Roychoudhury, Malay Roy Choudhury, Subimal Basak, Pranabkumar Chattopadhyay, Subodh Sarkar emerged.

The poets of East Bengal took different yet similar path, many taking inspiration from Kazi Nazrul Islam and other major poets. Some of the popular Bengali Muslim poets of this period included Farrukh Ahmad, Talim Hossain, Golam Mostofa and Raushan Yazdani. The Bangladesh Liberation War and struggle for freedom became a popular theme in the years that followed. Al Mahmud is considered one of the greatest Bengali poets to have emerged in the 20th century.

== See also ==
- List of Bengali poets
- List of national poetries
- List of Bangladeshi poets
