= Surendranath Majumder =

- সুরেন্দ্রনাথ মজুমদার
- Born: 1838; Jagannathpur, Jessore, British India (present-day Magura District, Bangladesh)
- Died: 15 October 1878 (aged 39–40)
- Occupations: Poet, Playwright, Translator
- Parent(s): Prasannanath Majumder, Bamasundari Devi
- Relatives: Devendranath Majumdar (younger brother)
- Writing career
- Period: 19th century
- Notable works: Mahila, Rajasthaner Itibritta

Surendranath Majumder (1838 – 15 October 1878) was a Bengali poet and playwright of the nineteenth century. He is regarded as one of the most distinctive poets of Bengali literature during the transitional period between Michael Madhusudan Dutt and Rabindranath Tagore. His epic poem Mahila is considered a significant addition to Bengali literature.

== Early life and family ==
Surendranath Majumder was born in 1838 in the village of Jagannathpur in the then Jessore District (now Magura District, Bangladesh). He was the son of Prasannanath Majumder and Bamasundari Devi. His younger brother, Devendranath Majumdar, was a poet and a prominent lay disciple of Sri Ramakrishna Paramahansa.

== Education ==
Majumder began his early education in his village. Later, he moved to Kolkata, where he studied at the Free Church Institution, Hare School, and the Oriental Seminary. Beyond his formal education, he attained proficiency in Sanskrit, Persian, and English through self-study. He also possessed a deep interest in and knowledge of philosophy.

== Career and personal life ==
Majumder's professional life was somewhat irregular. He served for a brief period in the estate office of the Tagore family at Jorasanko. In his personal life, he was known to be of a somewhat bohemian and whimsical nature, unable to settle into a steady vocation. His premature death is often attributed to his intemperate lifestyle.

== Literary works ==
Surendranath Majumder is recognized as a poet of the transitional era in Bengali literature. Much like his contemporary Biharilal Chakraborty, he made his own mark in the realm of lyric poetry; however, his primary achievement lies in his epic or narrative compositions. He translated James Tod's Annals and Antiquities of Rajasthan into Bengali as Rajasthaner Itibritta, a work that reflects his historical consciousness.

His magnum opus is the epic poem Mahila (The Woman). In this work, he glorified women in their roles as mothers, daughters, and wives. The poem is divided into two parts; the first volume was published in 1880, and the second was released posthumously in 1883. Although written in blank verse, the poem retains a lyrical quality. The introduction to the poem was written by Akshay Chandra Sarkar, who highly praised the poet's ability. Rabindranath Tagore and Dwijendranath Tagore also acclaimed his poetic talent. His poetry is noted for its expression of sensuous love and humanistic feelings, which was rare in the Bengali poetry of that period.

=== Bibliography ===
Significant works published during his lifetime and posthumously include:

Poetry

- Sadartu Barnan (1856) – His first published book of poetry.
- Sabita Sudarshan (1870)
- Fullara (1870)
- Barsabartan (1872)
- Mahila (Vol. I - 1880, Vol. II - 1883)

Translation and History

- Rajasthaner Itibritta (1872–73) – Published in 5 volumes.
- Bharater British Shasan Paridarshan (1869) – Written on the occasion of the Chaitra Mela.

Drama

- Hamir (1881) – Historical play.

Essays and others

- Bishva-Rahasya (1877)

He was also a regular contributor to journals such as Bibidhartha Sangraha, Samiran, Chikitsa-tattva Bijnan, and Nalini.

== Death ==
The talented poet died prematurely at the age of 40 on 15 October 1878.
