= P. K. De Sarkar =

Bengali grammarian and author (1892–1974)

- প্রফুল্লকুমার দে সরকার
- Born: 1892; Nilphamari, Rangpur, British India
- Died: 1974 (aged 81–82); Calcutta, West Bengal, India
- Education: Rajshahi College
- Writing career
- Language: English
- Period: 1926–1974
- Subject: English
- Notable works: A Text Book of Higher English Grammar, Composition and Translation

Prafulla Kumar De Sarkar [Bengali language প্রফুল্লকুমার দে সরকার] (1892–1974), was a teacher, English grammarian, and author. His A Text Book of Higher English Grammar, Composition and Translation, first published in 1926, continues to be used as a textbook among Bengali students learning English.

== Personal life ==
P. K. De Sarkar was born in 1892 in Nilphamari District in Rangpur, Bengal, British India, now in Bangladesh. He secured a job with Martin and Burn, Calcutta (now Kolkata). Refused entry into their library as per the British only policy of the time, Sarkar resigned. He went on to become the headmaster of Bholanath Bisweswar Hindu Academy in Rajshahi, now in Bangladesh. His students fondly referred to him as "Master-Moshai", literally meaning Teacher-Sir. During his tenure there, in 1926, A Text Book of Higher English Grammar, Composition and Translation was published. Shortly after the independence and Partition of India, he migrated to Calcutta in 1948. The book royalties remained his primary source of income until his death in 1974. He occasionally took up some work for a publishing house, but asked for only tickets to cricket matches in lieu. Sarkar has two sons, who are engineers, and two daughters who are microbiologists.

== A Text Book of Higher English Grammar, Composition and Translation ==
Sarkar is best known for his seminal book on English grammar. It was first published in 1926 by Saraswaty Press with P Ghosh & Co as publishers. At the time, the most popular English grammar books were the ones Henry Watson Fowler and John Nesfield. Sarkar's book focussed on the pedagogic needs of Indian students learning English grammar, and became very popular. Generations of students in West Bengal have used it to learn English grammar rather than the British ones. Sarkar continued to improve the book all through his life. Since his death in 1974, his eldest son, Pabitra Kumar De Sarkar (born 1932), continues to work on new editions. The family helps solve IAS questions of English, and incorporate the answers. Now in its 50th edition, launched 27 December 2016, the book sells over 20,000 copies annually.

== Fame as a seminal author ==
Along with K. C. Nag and Chitta Ranjan Dasgupta, (famously known as C. R. Dasgupta, as his name appears on his seminal book A Handbook of Degree Physics, Sarkar was considered to be one of the holy trinity of Bengali pedagogy.
