= Prabal Kumar Basu =

Indian poet, essayist and editor

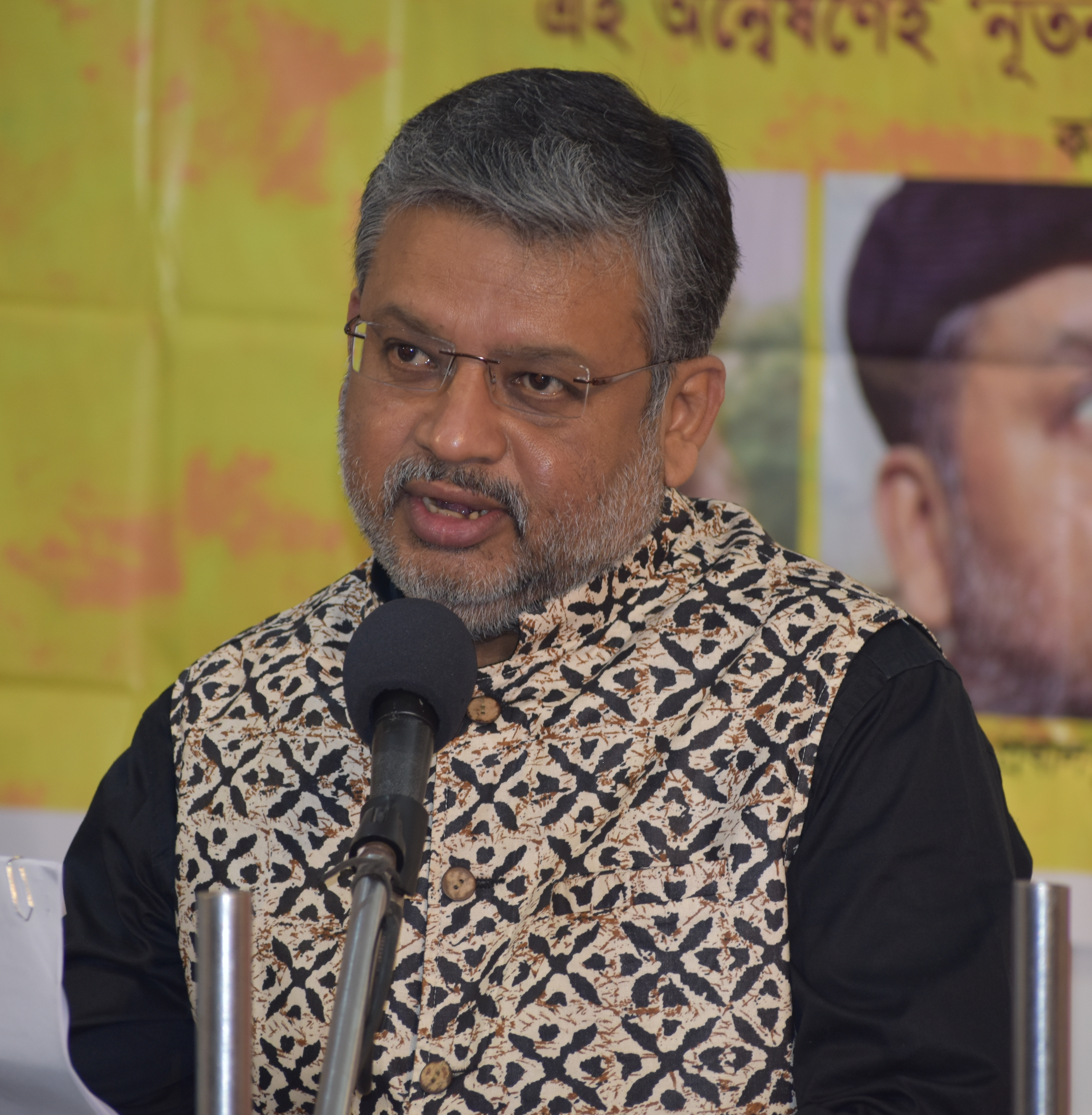
- Basu in 2018
- Born: 21 September 1960 (age 66); Kolkata, India
- Occupation: Poet

Prabal Kumar Basu (Bengali: প্রবালকুমার বসু) is an Indian poet, essayist and editor. He writes in his mother tongue Bengali.

== Early life ==
Prabal Kumar Basu was born on 21 September 1960, in Kolkata (erstwhile Calcutta) to Debkumar Basu and Chhanda Basu. Debkumar Basu was quite well known and active in the Bengali cultural sphere and most of his friends and acquaintances were prominent writers, poets, artists and others. Young Prabal grew up in an environment where the arts featured prominently as a part of daily life. The seeds of his literary aspirations were sowed at an early age.

The poet Shakti Chattopadhyay was a huge influence on Prabal. Travelling with the senior poet through rural West Bengal gave Prabal a ring-side view of man and nature intersect, a view which shaped his early works. His close association with nature increased manifold while he was studying engineering at Jalpaiguri which was close to the Dooars forest.

After poet Shakti Chattopadhayay's death Prabal came in close proximity with another literary stalwart Sunil Gangopadhyay who introduced Prabal to world literature and modernism. Both these ideals greatly influenced and shaped Prabal's later works.

== Literary career & contributions ==
Prabal started writing poetry from his college days and his first poetry book Tumi i Pratham was published immediately after he graduated. This brought him critical acclaim and he was awarded Gaurishankar Bhattacharjee Memorial Award. He also dabbled in theatre in college, especially verse dramas, and in 1981, he formed a cultural organization named Adhunik Sanskritik Parishad, which used to stage ballet forms of poems.

In 2002, Prabal edited Signposts: 50 years of Bengali Poetry since Independence. Since then, the book has become one of the most well-read and talked about books on Bengali poetry in English. In 2003 Prabal was instrumental in setting up the Kolkata International Foundation for Art, Literature and Culture, along with famous artists, theatre personalities, poets and others, with the objective was to set up a multi-cultural centre in Kolkata.

Prabal received much fame and accolades, along with the West Bengal Bangla Akademy Puraskar, for his poetry book Jamon Kore Gaichhe Akash in 2005. In this same year he was invited to the Third International Poetry Festival in Wellington, New Zealand. The festival was a confluence of poets from across the globe and Prabal developed a connection with other International poets. This greatly helped him acquire an international diction and world viewpoint which is evident in his later works. A crowning achievement was the Writers and Artists In-Residency Programme 2017' where he was the invited guest of the then President of India, Dr. Pranab Mukherjee. He stayed at the Rashtrapati Bhawan for two weeks and had multiple cultural exchanges with the President himself.

== Yapanchitra—a platform for young poets ==
It was in 2002, when Yapanchitra, a little magazine for literature, art and culture was published (editor: Barnali Roy), Prabal became its mentor. He was not merely a contributor but was responsible for the magazine's creative ideas and execution processes. In 2006, Prabal edited the international poetry volume for Yapanchitra. Later when Yapanchitra Foundation was established as a platform for young poets Prabal became the editor of Yapanchitra in the year 2017.

== Literary works ==
Following are the list of Prabalkumar Basu's literary works in different fields of literature:

=== Poetry collections ===
- Tumi i Pratham (1983)
- Byaktigata Smritistambher Pashe (1987)
- Sthayee Abaas O sthayee Thikana (1989)
- Janmobeej (1993)
- Yapanchitra (1994)
- Isworer Mukh (1998)
- Jemon Kore Gaichhe Akaash (2002)
- Manobanchha Ek Bindu Jol (2004)
- KothaTheke Shuru Karbo (2006)
- Shreshtho Kabita (2007)
- Aapnakei Thik Karte Hobe Gantyabyo (2008)
- Adharma Katha (2009)
- Bhalo Bolte Shikhun (2011)
- Premer Kabita (2012)
- Nirbachito Duratwo Mene (2013)
- Ei Je Ami Chalechi (2015)
- Aami To Boltei Partam (2017)
- Nirbachito Kabita (2017)
- Bhebechi Emni bhabei Hoy (2018)
- Balite Joler Dag (2019)
- Bakul Bamapodo Nitai Aar Ami (2020)
- November er Kabita (2022)
- Atmyiota Bagher Moto (2024)

=== Works translated in English ===
==== Poetry ====
- Of Lonely Rocks and Upright Trees (2006)
- All About Umbrellas (2008)
- As I Wander Along (2018)
- Fish without a bicycle (2022)
- In search of silence (2023)

==== Short stories ====
- Paradox of Truth (2013)

=== Short story collections (Bengali) ===
- Moha Bhoj (1993)
- Aamar Somoy Aamar Galpo (2008)
- Galpoi Galpo (2011)

=== Verse drama collections (Bengali) ===
- Chakrabyuha O Anyanyo Kabyanatya (2005)
- Kabyanatya Sangraha (2013)
- Anu-Natok (2025, collection of Micro plays)

=== Collection of essays ===
- Andho Jato Hoy Tato Dekhe (2007)
- Mor Bhabanare (2018)
- Tarun Kabir Kabyobhasha (2018)
- Chalte Chalte Rashtrapati Bhabana (2018)
- Kichhu Dekha Kichhu Katha (2019)
- Antoraaler Golpokatha (2019)
- Natya Natok Brittanto (2025)

=== Edited books ===
- Signposts: Bengali Poetry since Independence
- Anyo Aalo: Selection of essays by eminent authors, published in Yapanchitra magazine (2015)

== Awards and recognition ==
- Gaurishankar Bhattacharjee Memorial Award (1984)
- State Academy Award for Poetry (2005)
- Invitee at the 3rd Wellington International Poetry Festival in New Zealand (2005)
- Invitee at the 4th World Haiku Conference in Tokyo (2007)
- Invited by President of India, to President House, India, for fifteen days to join "Writers & Artists In-Residence" Program (2017)
- Felicitated by BRICKS Writers association (2024)
- Invited at Cairo for Cairo bookfair (2025)
- Invited at Babylon for Babylon Festival (2025)
- Invited at Mexico for Zamora poetry festival from 3rd sept to 7th sept (2025)
- Prabal's book translated in Spanish language was published by Mexican publisher Al- Golem in August 2025. Prabal is the second Bengali poet to get invitation to read poetry in Mexico after Tagore.
- Prabal also read poetry in Bowery poetry club of New York, US on 10th Sept, 2025
