= Akshay Kumar Baral =

Bengali poet and writer

Akshay Kumar Boral
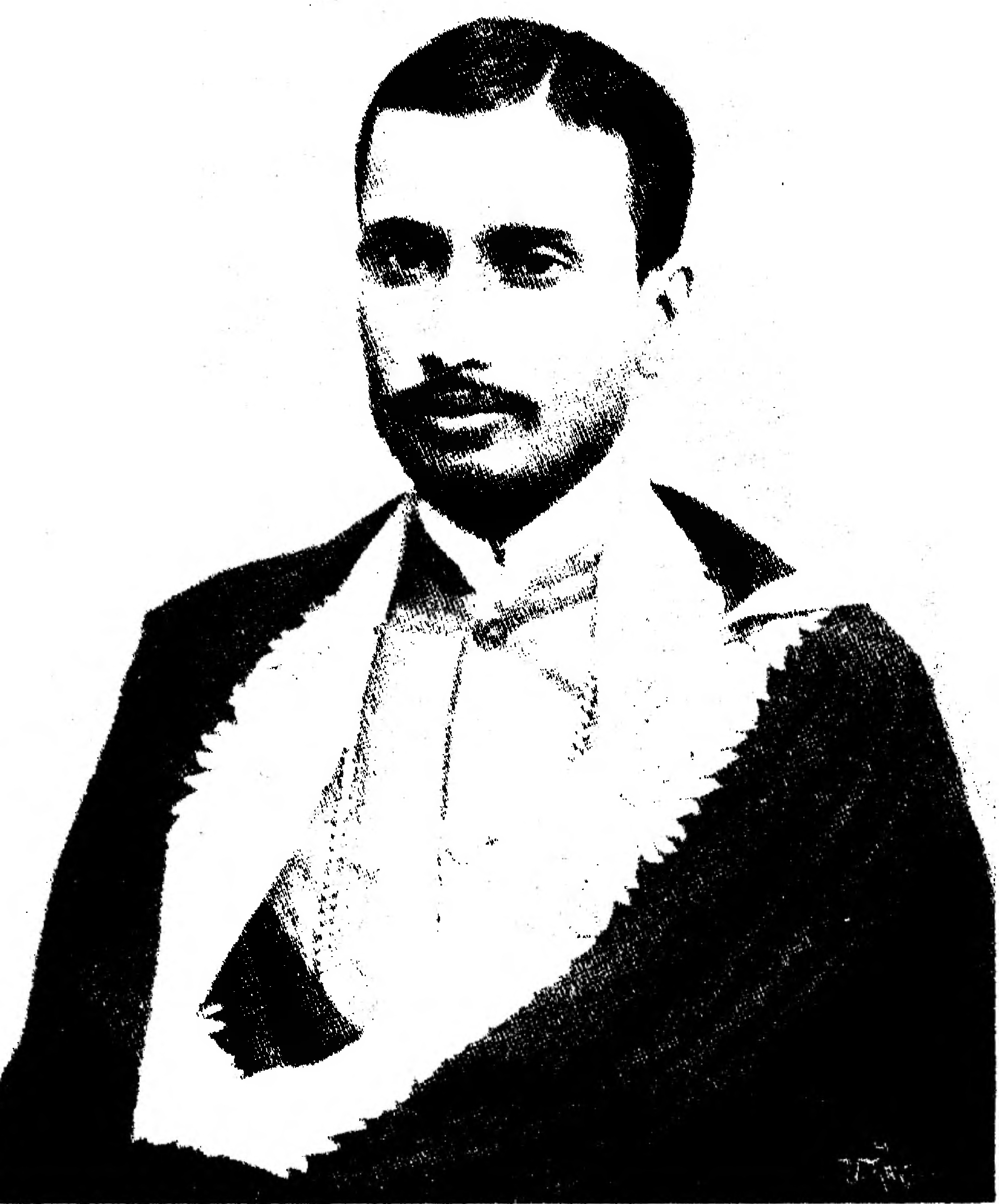
- Born: 1860; Calcutta, Bengal Presidency, British India
- Died: 19 June 1919 (aged 58–59); Calcutta, Bengal Presidency, British India
- Occupation: Poet
- Relatives: Amal Dutta (grandson)

Akshay Kumar Baral (1860–1919) was an Indian Bengali language poet and writer. He was born in Calcutta. The family originally hailed from Chandannagar, Hooghly District.

== Early life ==
Baral was born in 1860 in Chorbagan, Calcutta, Bengal Presidency, British India. He studied at Hare School for some time. He worked as an accounts clerk in the Delhi and London Bank. He worked as a secretary at the North-British Life Insurance Company.

== Career ==
Boral was a fan of poet Biharilal Chakraborty. Sisir Kumar Das described Boral's poetry as meditative and thoughtful. According to Narayan Choudhuri, he wrote some of the best examples of elegiac poems in Indian literature.

== Bibliography ==
Plays

- Prodip (1884)
- Kanakanjoli (1885)
- Shankha (1910)
- Esha (1912)
- Vul
- Chandidas (1917)
