= Angshuman Kar =

Indian writer

- অংশুমান কর
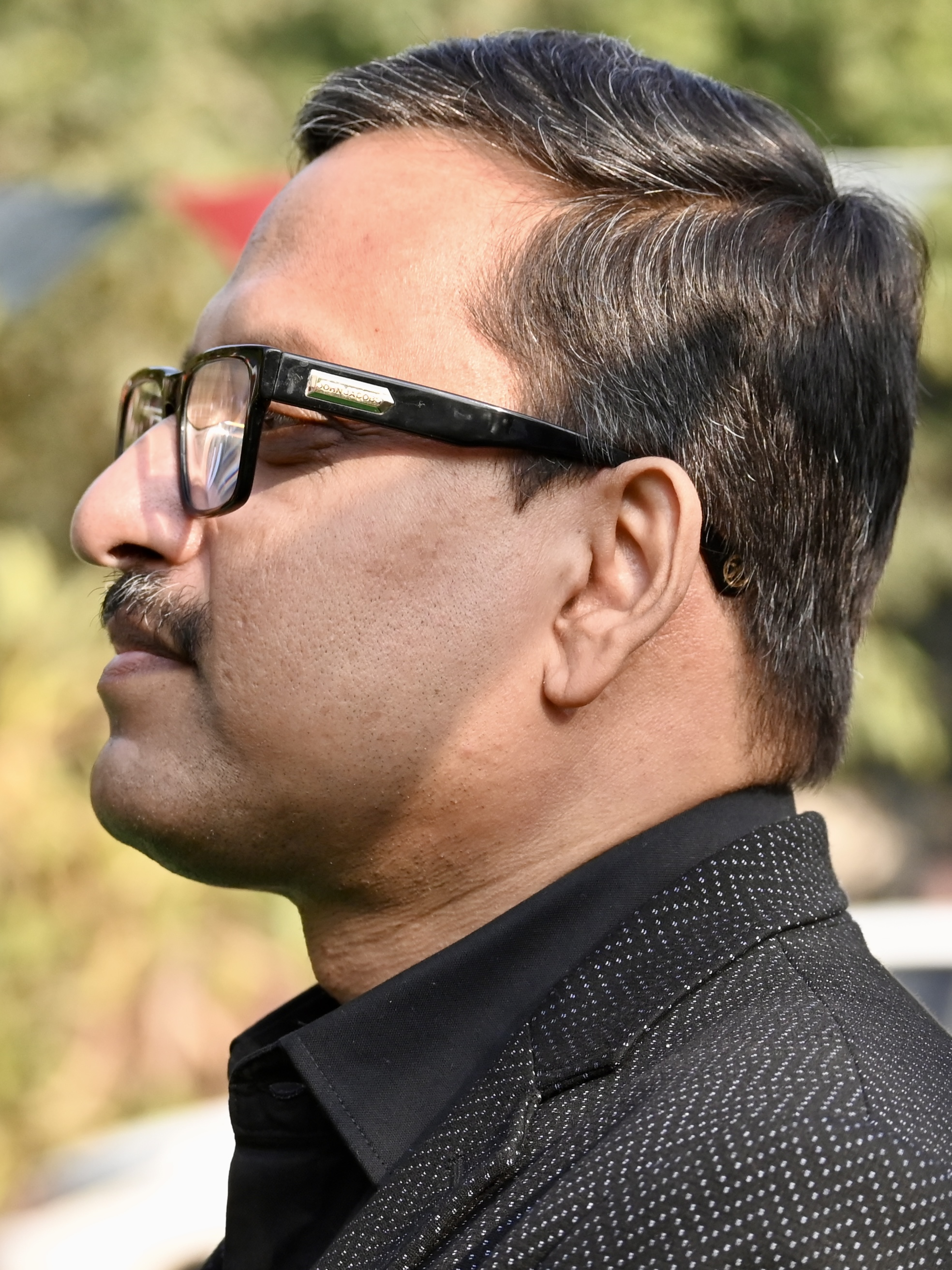
- Angshuman Kar in 2025
- Born: Beliatore, Bankura, West Bengal, India
- Education: J. K. College
- Occupations: Poet, writer, professor
- Writing career
- Language: Bengali, English
- Genre: Poetry
- Subject: Literature

Angshuman Kar (Bengali: অংশুমান কর) is a Bengali poet and professor of English literature at Burdwan University. He is currently working as a professor of English at the University of Burdwan, West Bengal. He had served as the Secretary of the Eastern Region, Sahitya Akademi as well as a member of advisory board (Bengali) of the Sahitya Akademi.

== Early life and career ==
Kar was born in Beliatore, Bankura, and graduated from J. K. College, Purulia.

He received the fellowship of the Australia–India Council for his research into Aboriginal petitions. He has held positions in various Australian universities.

== Bibliography ==
=== Poetry ===
- Khelna Pistol, Prachhaya, Barasat,1998
- Bou Ke Nie Lekha Kabita, Kabita Dashdine, Kolkata, 1998
- Garie Namchhi, Kabita Pakshik, Kolkata, 1999
- Apel Saharer Samrat, Kabita Dashdine, Bankura, 2001
- Bankura Purulia Kolkata, Prativash, Kolkata, 2004
- Nasho Square Feeter Jadukar, Saptarshi Prakashan, Kolkata, 2006
- Mukhomukhi Dui Kobi (written with Tarapada Roy), Papyrus, 2007
- Jehadi Tomake, Saptarshi Prakashan, Kolkata, 2008
- Amar Sonar Harin, Saptarshi Prakashan, Kolkata, 2012

=== Prose ===
- The Politics of Social Exclusion in India: Democracy at the Crossroads, Routledge, Co-editor, with Harihar Bhattacharyya and Partha Sarkar, 2009 (history)
- Paribortan, Parampara, Kolkata, 2011 (novel)
- 25 Paysar Itihas Boi, Parampara, Kolkata, 2010 (memoir)
- Contemporary Indian Diaspora: Literary and Cultural Representations, 2015
- Bikhato Hoibar Sahaj Upay, 2015

== Awards ==
- Krittibas Award (2007)
- Paschimbanga Bangla Akademi Award (2009)
- Bongiya Sahitya Parishad Puroskar (2012)

== Controversy ==
On 23 July 2020, allegations of sexual harassment were made against Kar in a complaint email that was forwarded to the Vice Chancellor of the University of Burdwan. The allegations state that he has engaged in sexual relations with several of his students and has sexually abused at least one of them.

However, in September 2021, Kolkata High Court took down all the charges against Dr. Kar, and also gave him clean chit.
