= Dinesh Chandra Chattopadhyay =

Bengali writer and editor

- Born: 27 January 1917; Jessore, Bengal, British India
- Died: 10 February 1995 (aged 78); Kolkata, West Bengal, India
- Education: M.A.
- Alma mater: Calcutta University; St. Xavier's College, Kolkata
- Occupations: Writer, publisher, editor
- Notable work: Duranata Eagal, Nil Ghurni, Bhayankarer Jibankotha
- Children: Tridib Kumar Chattopadhyay
- Awards: National Award; Vidyasagar Memorial Award

Dinesh Chandra Chattopadhyay (27 January 1917 – 10 February 1995) was a Bengali writer and editor.

== Early life ==
Chattopadhyay was born in 1917 at Paikara village, Jessore District in British India (now in Khulna, Bangladesh). His father Abani Bhushan was a mathematician and text book author. After the Entrance Examination he entered in St. Xavier's College, Kolkata. While studying in college he was attracted with revolutionary movement under the guidance of Pulin Behari Das. In 1939, Chattopadhyay joined in Communist Party of India and started work as volunteer. Muzaffar Ahmed and Nripen Chakraborty inspired him to work in Swadhinata, a Bengali weekly magazine of the undivided Communist Party. He passed M.A. in English from the Calcutta University.

== Literary career ==
Chattopadhyay wrote and published number of Bengali books of children's literature from his ancestral publishing house Bidyoday Library in Kolkata. He published Kishore Bharati Child Magazine since 1968. He first got recognition for the novel Duranta Eagal which was serially released in Kishore Bharati and Nil Ghurni. In 1962 Chattopadhyay received National award for his book Bhayankarer Jibankotha and Vidyasagar Smriti Puraskar in 1987 for his classic creation Duranta Eagal. In 1982, he established Patra Bharati, a publishing company. He sometimes used two pen names, Dinanath Kashyap and Kathak Thakur.

== Works ==
- Duranta Eagal
- Nil Ghurni
- Manush Omanush
- Kaler Joyadanka Baje
- Bigganer Duswapna
- Dussahasi Ranju
- Bhayankarer Jibankotha
- Bhaba Samagra (Vol 1 & 2)
- Galpo Bole Bharat
- Chirakaler Golpo
- Oder Banchte Dao
