= Hemchandra Bandyopadhyay =

Bengali poet (1838–1903)

- হেমচন্দ্র বন্দ্যোপাধ্যায়
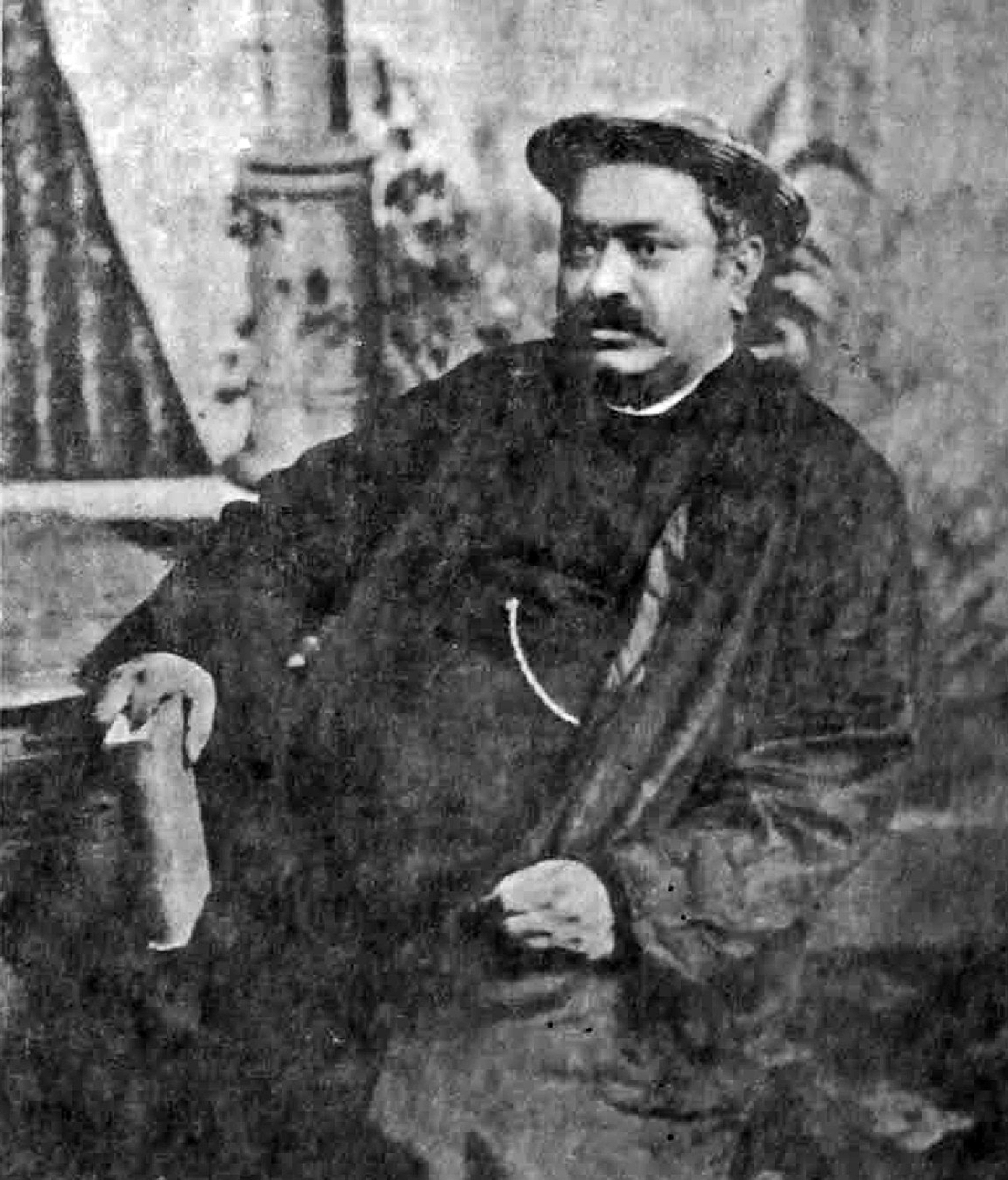
- Born: April 17, 1838; Gulita Village, Hooghly, British India (now Gulita Village, West Bengal, India)
- Died: May 24, 1903 (aged 65); Kidderpore, Calcutta, British India (now Khidirpur, West Bengal, India)
- Occupations: Poet, clerk, teacher, lawyer

Hemchandra Bandyopadhyay (Bengali: হেমচন্দ্র বন্দ্যোপাধ্যায়, romanized: Hēmacandra bandyōpādhyāẏa, April 17, 1838 – May 24, 1903), also known as Hemchandra Banerjee, was a Bengali poet and lawyer.

Educated at Hindu College and the University of Calcutta, he worked in various roles including clerk, headmaster, and lawyer, and also served as a government pleader. His literary career began with the poetry collection Chintatarangini (1861). He is noted for the epic poem Vrittasamhara (1875–1877). Influenced by Michael Madhusudan Dutt, Bandyopadhyay addressed themes such as national identity in works including Bharat Sangeet.

== Early life ==
Hemchandra Bandyopadhyay was born on April 17, 1838, in Gulita Village, near Rajbalhat, the eldest of four brothers and two sisters. His father, Kailashchandra Bandyopadhyay, faced financial difficulties. He was married to Anandamayi, the daughter of Rajchandra Chakraborty, a solicitor in the Kolkata court. Following the death of his grandfather, the family's situation worsened, leading to an interruption in his education at Khidirpur Bangla School in Kolkata. In 1853, Prasannakumar Sarvadhikari, principal of Kolkata Sanskrit College, helped him gain admission to the senior school division of Hindu College, where he was enrolled in the second standard. In 1855, he placed second in the Junior Scholarship Examination. That same year, he married Kamini Devi. In 1857, he placed fourth in the Senior Scholarship Examination. When the scholarship ended during his fourth year, he had to discontinue his studies.

== Career ==
In 1859, Hemchandra began working as a clerk in the Military Audit Office. He later became headmaster of the Calcutta Training Academy. After earning his LLB degree in 1861, he began practicing law at the Calcutta High Court. In 1862, he was appointed a Munsif (junior judicial officer), but returned to the High Court after a few months. He completed his Bachelor of Laws (B.L.) in 1866 and in April 1890 was appointed as a government pleader.

== Poetry and literature ==
Hemchandra's first poetry collection, Chintatarangini, was published in 1861. He is particularly known for Vrittasamhara (The Slaying of Vritra), issued in two volumes between 1875 and 1877.

In July 1872, his poem Bharat Sangeet (The Song of India) appeared in the Education Gazette. Other works addressed subjects such as national identity, including Bharatbilap (The Lament for India), Kalachakra (The Wheel of Time), Ripan Utsav (The Ripon Festival), Bharater Nidravanga (India's Awakening), Ganga (The Ganges), and Janmabhumi (The Motherland).

His other works include:

- Birbahu (1864)
- Ashakanan (1876)
- Sangarupaka Kabya
- Chhayamayi (1880)
- Bibidha Kavita (Various Poems, 1300 Bangla Year)
- Dash Mahavidya (The Ten Great Wisdoms, 1882)

=== Short poems ===
- Jiban Sangeet (The Song of Life) – an adaptation of Henry Wadsworth Longfellow's A Psalm of Life
- Bharat Sangeet (The Song of India)
- Bharat Bilap (The Lament for India)
- Gangar Utpatti (The Origin of the Ganges)
- Padmer Mrinal (The Lotus Stem)
- Bharat Kahini (The Tale of India)
- Ashoktaru
- Kulin Kanyaganer Akhep (The Lament of Aristocratic Daughters)

== Death ==
In his later years, Hemchandra lived in poverty and suffered from near blindness. He died on May 24, 1903, in Khidirpur, Kolkata.
