= Tridib Kumar Chattopadhyay =

Bengali writer and editor

- ত্রিদিবকুমার চট্টোপাধ্যায়
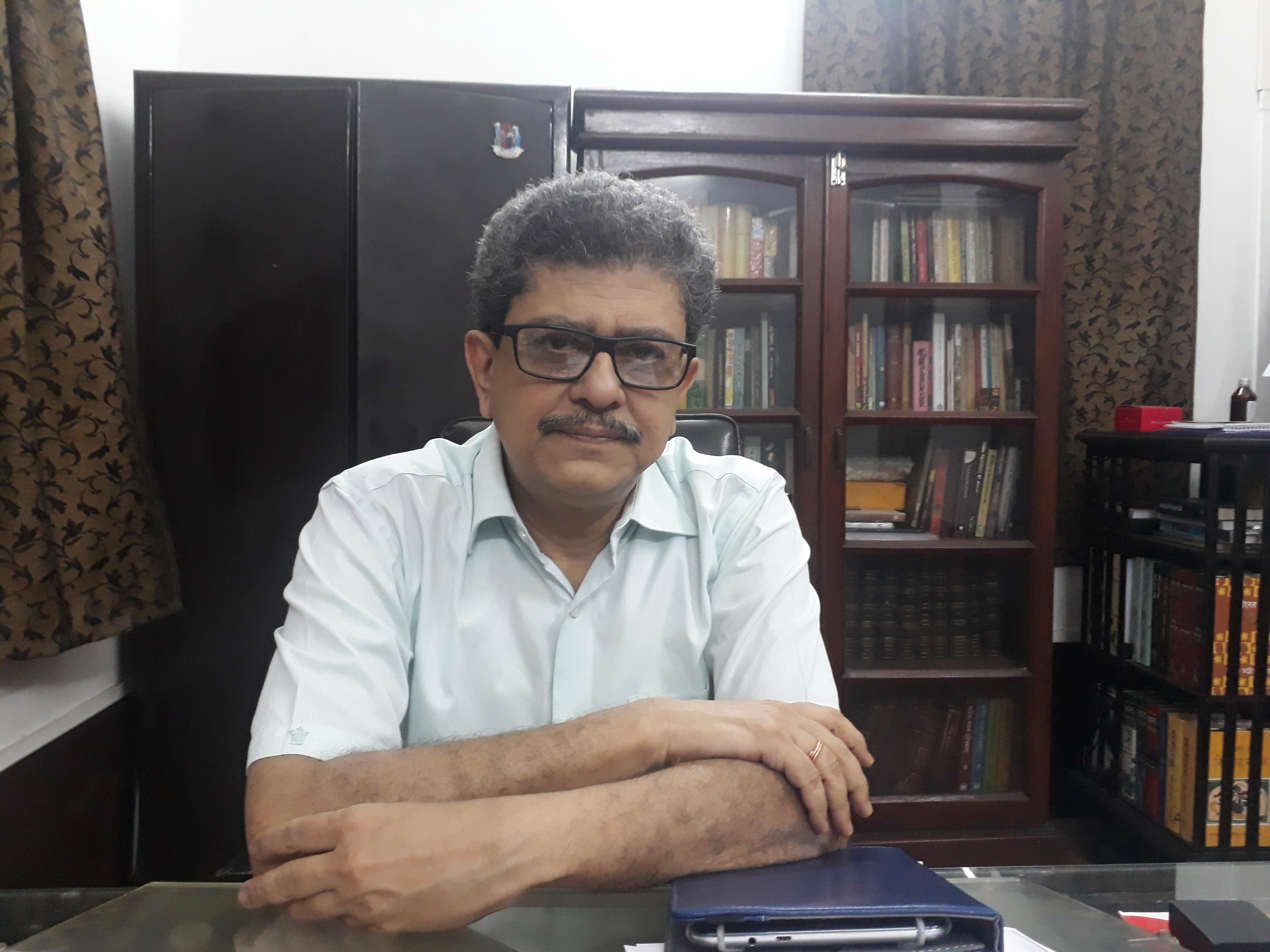
- Tridib Kumar Chattopadhyay in the office of Patra Bharati
- Born: 30 October 1958 (age 67); Kolkata
- Other name: Tutun
- Education: M.Sc.
- Alma mater: Calcutta University; Hindu School, Kolkata
- Occupations: Editor, Writer
- Years active: 1976 - present
- Organization: Patra Bharati
- Spouse: Chumki Chattopadhyay
- Parent: Dinesh Chandra Chattopadhyay (father)

Tridib Kumar Chattopadhyay (born 30 October 1958) is a Bengali writer and editor. He is the General Secretary of the Publishers & Booksellers Guild, organiser of International Kolkata Book Fair as well as the present owner of Patra Bharati.

== Early life ==
Chattopadhyay was born in 1958 in Kolkata. His father Dinesh Chandra Chattopadhyay was an eminent author and publisher. He passed Higher Secondary Examination in 1975 from Hindu School and completed M.Sc. in Botany from the Calcutta University.

== Career ==
Chattopadhyay started his literary career in 1976 in Kishore Bharati Magazine, founded by his father Dinesh Chandra. His first novel Haath (The Hand) was published in 1985. Chattopadhyay wrote and edited number science fiction, mystery thriller and Jagu Mama detective series as well as stories for adults. His novel named Mukhosher Arale was screened on television. He achieved number of awards for the contribution in Bengali Children's literature. Chattopadhyay, presently the chief editor of Kishore Bharati magazine, operates Patra Bharati Publication house in Kolkata. He is a regular writer of Bengali magazines and guest lecturer of the University of Calcutta on Diploma courses in Book Publishing. Chattopadhyay is also a life member of Indian Science Congress Association, World Wildlife Fund and honorary General Secretary of the Publishers & Booksellers Guild since 2004.

== Works ==
- Sabdhan Suspense
- Jagu Mama Rahasyo Samagra (in 4 volumes)
- Mrityuke Ami Dekhechi
- Dwiper Naam Kaladera
- Anantababu Kothay
- Tumi Pitamoho
- Voyer Arale Voy
- Boroder Baro
- Gopon Premer Golpo
- Bhoutik Aloukik
- Asi Baje Jhonjhon
- Arbi Punthir Rahosyo
- Aajo Romanchokor
- Nil Kakrar Rahossyo
- Raktorahosyo
- Ekhono Gaye Kanta Dey

== Awards ==
- Amrita Kamal Child Literature award (1990)
- President of India felicitation (2007)
- Rotary Banga Ratna Award
- Atulya Smriti Samman
- Vidyasagar Smriti Purashkar (2023)
- Bal Sahitya Puraskar by Sahitya Akademi (2025)
