= Akshay Chandra Sarkar =

Indian poet

- অক্ষয়চন্দ্র সরকার
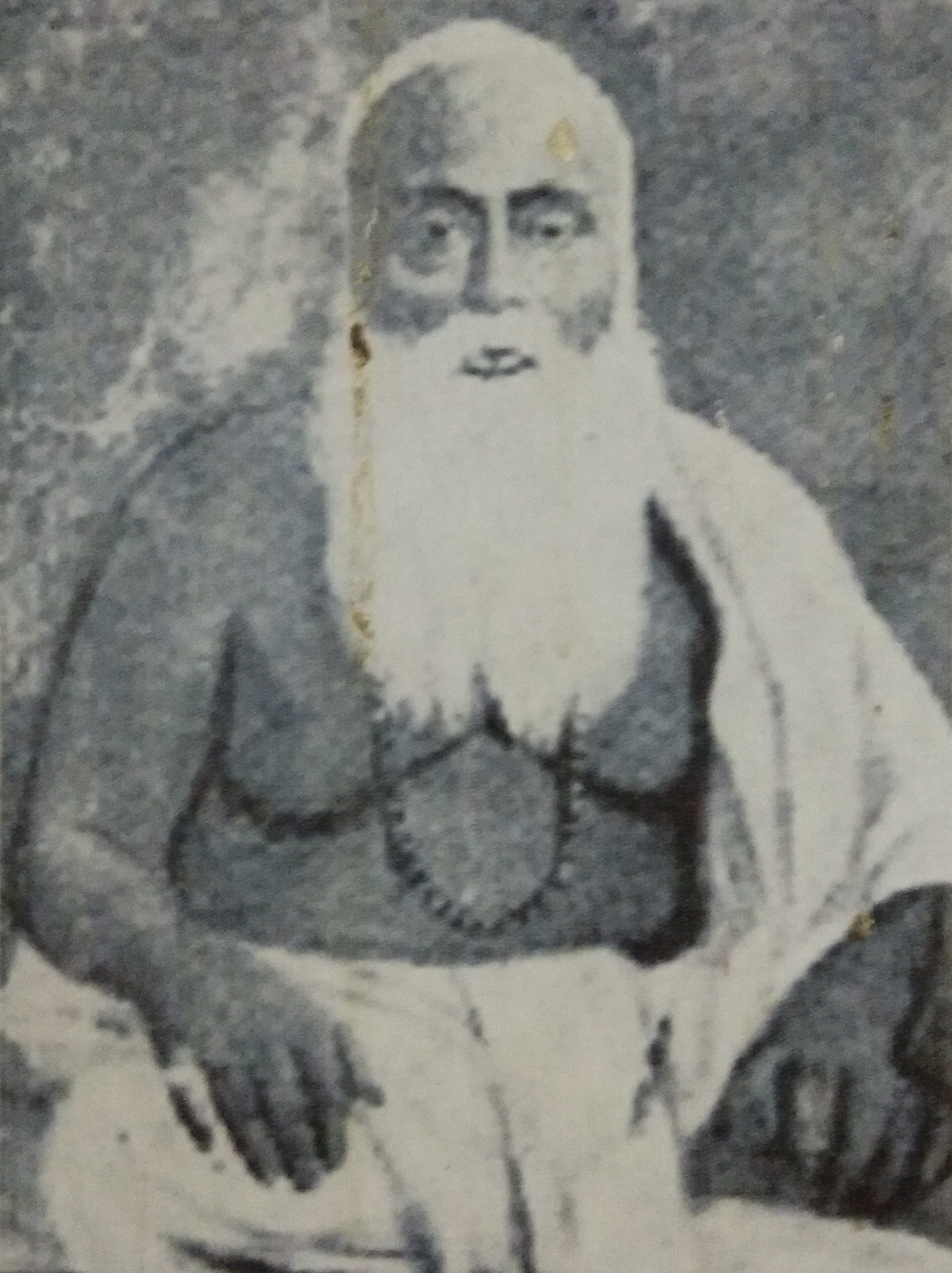
- Born: 11 December 1846; Chinsura, Hoogly, India
- Died: 2 October 1917 (aged 70); Calcutta, India

Akshay Chandra Sarkar (Bengali: অক্ষয়চন্দ্র সরকার) was a poet, an editor, and a literary critic of Bengali literature.

== Biography ==
He was born at Kadamtala, Chinsurah, headquarters of Hooghly District of Bengal in British India on 11 December 1846. He died on 2 October 1917 at Calcutta. His father was the famed author and poet Sub-judge Roy Ganga Charan Sarkar Bahadur.

He was a reputed Bengali author, editor and critic. He owned, edited and published the weekly political and Hindu cultural journal "Sadharani". He was also the publisher of the monthly magazine "Naba Jiban".

He was active in promoting national industry and independence oriented educational reforms. He preached the use only of domestic products. He actively opposed British Government's "Rent Bill" and "Age of Consent Bill”. For a while he practised law at Berhampore and then later at Chinsurah.

With Mr Sarada Charan Mitra, who later became a judge at the Calcutta High Court, Akshay Chandra had compiled, edited and published a collection of old Bengali poetry "Prachin Kabya Sangraha". Children's Bengali book of poems "Gocharaner Math", simple and devoid of compound letters, was his creation. Among his other well-known work were "Sankshipta Ramayan", "Alochana", "Roopak O Rahasya", "Shiksha Nabisher Galpa", "Maha Pooja", "Hatey Hatey Phal", autobiographical "Pita Putra", "Sanatani", "Sahitya Sadhana" and "Kabi Hemchandra".

He was a close friend of Bankim Chandra Chatterjee whom he had first met while at Berhampore. He was Bankim Chandra's right hand man in publishing "Banga Darshan" (1872) to which he used to contribute. Every month he used to review current books in "Banga Darshan".

Akshay Chandra was Vice-President of Bengal Literary Association for many years and in addition was its life-member. At the fifth annual conference of the Association at Chinsurah he chaired over the Welcoming Committee; next year at the Chittagong conference he was the Chairman. At the 1886 Congress Conference he was most active and joined the Party.

The influential politician Atulya Ghosh was Akshay Chandra's daughter's son. Akshay Chandra's granddaughter Lakshmimoni was married to the famous mathematician Keshab Chandra Nag.

.
