= Sanjib Chattopadhyay =

Indian writer

- সঞ্জীব চট্টোপাধ্যায়
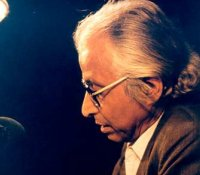
- Sanjib Chattopadhyay
- Born: 24 October 1934 (age 92); Calcutta, British India
- Education: Scottish Church College; University of Calcutta
- Occupation: Writer
- Spouse: Geeta Chattopadhyay
- Children: Apurba Chattopadhyay
- Writing career
- Language: Bengali
- Period: Contemporary
- Genres: Novel, story, spiritual, fiction, humanitarian
- Notable works: Lotakambal; Shakha Prashakha; Swet Patharer Table
- Notable awards: Ananda Purashkar (1981); Sahitya Akademi Award (2018)

Sanjib Chattopadhyay (Bengali: সঞ্জীব চট্ট্যোপাধ্যায়; born 24 October 1934 in Kolkata, India) is an Indian Bengali novelist and writer of short stories. His style is characterized by use of short satirical sentences mixed with very lively language.

== Childhood and education ==
Sanjib Chattopadhyay spent his childhood in the hilly terrain of Chota Nagpur Plateau under the care of his father after his mother died when he was five. They relocated to Calcutta and he was admitted to Victoria Institution school which he joined at grade seven. He later graduated from the Scottish Church College where he studied chemistry.

== Work ==
The subjects of his fiction are mostly families living in Calcutta city. Within the confines of these homes, he challenges the moral values of the fast-changing middle class of the city. Chattopadhyay frequently uses old men as his protagonists. These aged characters create the spiritual and philosophical edge found in his novels Lotakambal (The Vessel and Quilt) and Shakha Prasakha (Branches). Arguably the most famous of his creations is Lotakambal. His most famous novella Swet Patharer Table (The Ivory Table) is an example of his characteristic style of story-telling which mixes tension, dilemma, curiosity, pity, humor, and satire. He has written fiction for children and continues to write for magazines and newspapers. Chattopdhyay's current writing is related to Ramkrishna Paramhansa Sarada Devi and Swami Vivekananda. Some of his major works apart from the above-mentioned are:

- Parampadokamale (At His Divine Feet)
- Cancer
- Duti Chair (Two Chairs)
- Roshe Boshe
- Rakish Maa Roshe Boshe
- Besh Achhi Roshe Boshe
- Tumi Aar Aami (You And I)
- Eke Eke (One By One)
- Kolkata Achhe Kolkatatei (Calcutta Is In Calcutta)
- Sheuli - A novel about a family consisting of grandfather, grandmother, father, mother and their son and daughter with many aspirations nestled inside satire.
- Iti Palash
- Iti Tomaar Maa
- Bullet
- Mapa Hashi Chapa Kanna (a book on satire)
- Halka Hashi Chokher Jol (a book on satire) [Light Smile Tears]
- Ujan Beye Jai
- Mojar Foara
- Bhagabaner Kaane Dilen Bhagabaner Naam by Dey's Publishing
- Nirbane Anirban Buddha Bhagaban by Dey's Publishing
- BHOR HOLO by Patra Bharati
- Ka Tobo Kanta by Dey's Publishing
- Porokiya by Patra Bharati
- BRAMHADATYIR BACCHA by Patra Bharati

Apart from these, his notable juvenile literature includes the Ruku-Suku and Badomama-Mejomama series (recompiled & published as Mama Samagra by KGB Prakashani) which are fun-filled and analyse various philosophical aspects of life through the eyes of children.

== Awards ==
- Chattopadhyay is the recipient of the Ananda Puraskar in 1981.
- He received the Banga Bibhushan award from the Govt. of West Bengal in May, 2012.
- He received the Sahitya Akademi Award in 2018 for his novel Sri Krishner Sesh Kota Din at an age of 82 years.
