= Shanibarer Chithi =

A page from Shanibarer Chithi.

Shanibarer Chithi (meaning the Saturday Letter in English) was a monthly Bengali literary magazine published by Shaniranjan Press in Kolkata, India. It was published between 1924 and 1962.

== History and profile ==
It was founded in 1924 by Ashok Chattopadhyay as the conservative response to the progressive literary magazine Kallol which was founded a year ago. Its first issue appeared on 26 July 1924. The magazine started as a weekly publication and later became a monthly publication. The magazine was one of the major satirical publications in India. Sajanikanta Das joined the magazine from eleventh issue as the editor who made the magazine popular.

Shanibarer Chithi ceased publication in 1962.

== Editors ==
- Jogananda Das
- Nirad Chandra Chaudhuri
- Sajanikanta Das
- Parimal Goswami
