= Sajanikanta Das =

Bengali poet, literary critic

Sajanikanta Das (25 August 1900 – 11 February 1962) was a Bengali poet, literary critic and editor of Shanibarer Chithi.

== Early life ==
Sajanikanta was born at Betalban village, Bardhaman district. He passed the entrance examination from Dinajpur Zilla School and entered into the Presidency College Calcutta in 1918. Das did not complete his study there due to political causes and joined in Bankura Weslian Missionary College. Thereafter he passed B.Sc from Scottish Church College.

== Literary career ==
Das joined in the esteemed Bengali magazine Shanibarer Chithi while he was studying M.Sc and took the pen name Bhabkumar Pradhan. He became the chief editor of the magazine from the 11th issue and got popularity for satire based criticism. His prose, satirical attack hit eminent personalities of Bengal. He was also attached with Prabasi, Dainik Basumati and Bangashree magazines. Das researched and published articles on ancient Bengali literature, socio-political issues of Bengal. He was a well known intellectual for his time as a constructive critic, lyricist, script writer and play writer. Das was the president of Bangiya Sahitya Parishad for ten years consecutively. He established Shaniranjan Press and Ranjan Publishing House in Kolkata.

== Work ==
The books of Sajanikanta Das namely:

- Monodarpan
- Path Chalte Ghaser Ful
- Ajoy
- Bhab O Chando
- Bangla Sahityer Itihas
- Bango Rangabhum
- Panchise Baishakh
- Madhu O Ful
- Angushtho
- Wilium Carrie
- Rabindranath : Jibon O Sahitya
