= Mallika Sengupta =

Bengali poet, feminist, and reader of sociology

- Born: 27 March 1960; Krishnanagar, Nadia, India
- Died: 28 May 2011 (aged 51); Kolkata, India
- Education: Maharani Kasiswari College
- Known for: Poet
- Spouse: Subodh Sarkar

Mallika Sengupta (Bengali: মল্লিকা সেনগুপ্ত; 1960–2011) was a Bengali poet, feminist, and reader of Sociology from Kolkata, known for her "unapologetically political poetry".

== Biography ==
Mallika Sengupta was the head of the Department of Sociology in Maharani Kasiswari College, an undergraduate college affiliated with the University of Calcutta in Kolkata. She was much better known for her literary activity. The author of more than 20 books including 14 volumes of poetry and two novels, she was widely translated and was a frequent invitee at international literary festivals.

For twelve years in the 90s she was the poetry editor of Sananda, the largest circulated Bengali fortnightly (edited by Aparna Sen). Along with her husband, the noted poet Subodh Sarkar, she was the founder-editor of Bhashanagar, a culture magazine in Bengali.

English translations of her work have appeared in various Indian and American anthologies. In addition to teaching, editing and writing, she was actively involved with the cause of gender justice and other social issues.

She had begun breast cancer treatment in 2005 and died on the 28th of May 2011.

=== Activism and literary themes ===
Sengupta was also active in a number of protest and gender activism groups. Her fiery, combative tone is noticeable in many poems, e.g. "While teaching my son history":

Man alone was both God and Goddess
Man was both father and mother
Both tune and flute
Both penis and vagina
As we have learnt from history.
– from Mallika Sengupta, Kathamanabi, Bhashanagar, kolkata, 2005, (tr. poet)

often dealing with women's marginalised role in history:

after the battle said chenghis khan
the greatest pleasure of life,
is in front of the vanquished enemy
to sleep with his favourite wife.
– Juddha Sheshe Nari – from Mallika Sengupta, Kathamanabi, Bhashanagar, kolkata, 2005, (tr. amitabha mukerjee)

Particularly evocative is her feminist rendition of the legend of Khana, a medieval female poet whose tongue was allegedly cut off by her jealous husband:

In Bengal in the Middle Ages
Lived a woman Khana, I sing her life
The first Bengali woman poet
Her tongue they severed with a knife
Her speechless voice, "Khanar Bachan"
Still resonates in the hills and skies
Only the poet by the name of Khana
Bleeding she dies.
– Khana, tr. amitabha mukerjee

== Awards and honours ==
- Junior Fellowship for Literature from the Dept. of Culture, Govt. of India (1997–99)
- Sukanto Puroskar from the Govt. of West Bengal (1998)
- Bangla Academy award from the Govt. of West Bengal (2004)
- Has been invited to poetry readings, conferences and seminars in Sweden (1987), Australia (1994), USA (2002 & 2006), Czech Republic (2009) and Bangladesh (1998 & 2002) as part of Indian writer's delegation.

== Works ==
=== Poetry ===
- Challish Chander Ayu, Virus publication, 1983
- Ami Sindhur Meye, Prativas publication, Kolkata, 1988
- Haghare O Debdasi, Prativas publication, Kolkata, 1991
- Ardhek Prithivi, Ananda Publishers, Kolkata, 1993, ISBN 81-7215-247-7
- Meyeder Aa Aaa Ka Kha, Prativas publication, Kolkata, 1998
- Kathamanabi, Ananda Publishers, Kolkata, 1999, ISBN 81-7215-915-3
- Deoyalir Rat, Patralekha, Kolkata, 2001
- Amra Lasya Amra Ladai, Sristi Prakashani, Kolkata, 2001 Book Excerptise (2 translations)
- Purushke Lekha Chithi, Ananda Publishers, Kolkata, 2003, ISBN 81-7756-286-X Book Excerptise (1 poem online)
- Chheleke History Parate Giye, Ananda Publishers, Kolkata, 2005

- Shrestha Kabita, Kolkata, Dey's Publication, 2005
- Aamake Sariye Dao Valobasa, Ananda Publishers, Kolkata, 2006, ISBN 81-7756-573-7
- Purusher Janyo Eksho Kabita, Deep Prakashan, Kolkata, 2007
- O Janemon Jibananada, Banolata Sen Likhchhi, Kolkata, Ananda Pub. 2008
- Brishtimichhil Barudmichhil, Kolkata, Ananda Pub. 2010

=== Poetry in English translation ===
- Carriers of Fire, Bhashanagar, Kolkata, 2002
- Kathamanabi, her voice and Other Poems, Bhashanagar, kolkata, 2005

=== Novels ===
- Seetayan, Ananda Publishers, Kolkata, 1995, ISBN 81-7215-618-9
- Sleelatahanir Pare, Ananda Publishers, Kolkata, 1996, ISBN 81-7215-713-4
- Kabir Bouthan, Ananda Publishers, Kolkata, 2011, ISBN 978-81-7756-977-3

=== Books on sociology of gender ===
- Strilinga Nirmana, Ananda Publishers, Kolkata, 1994, ISBN 81-7215-368-6
- Purush Nay Purushtantra, Vikash Grantha Bhavan, Kolkata, 2002
- Bibahabichchhinnar Akhyan, Banglar Samaj O Sahitye, Kolkata, Papyrus, 2007

=== Translation ===
- Akaler Madhye Saras, translation from Kedarnath Singh's Hindi poems, Sahitya Akademi, Kolkata, 1998

=== Bengali poetry anthology ===
- Dui Banglar Meyeder Shreshtha kabita, Upasana, Kolkata, 2003
