= Girindrasekhar Bose =

Indian psychiatrist (1887–1953)

- Born: Girindrasekhar Bose; 31 January 1887; Darbhanga, Bengal Presidency, British India (now in Bihar, India)
- Died: 3 June 1953 (aged 66); Calcutta, West Bengal, India

Girindrasekhar Bose (31 January 1887 – 3 June 1953) was an early 20th-century Indian psychoanalyst, the first president (1922–1953) of the Indian Psychoanalytic Society. Bose carried on a twenty-year dialogue with Sigmund Freud. Known for disputing the specifics of Freud's Oedipus complex theory, he has been pointed to by some as an early example of non-Western contestations of Western methodologies. Apart from this, he also started the first general hospital psychiatry unit (GHPU) in Asia at the R.G. Kar Medical College, Calcutta in 1933.

Bose was born in Darbhanga, in Eastern India, when the country was under British rule. His father was the chief administrator of the Raja (king) of Darbhanga, and Girindrasekhar was the youngest of 4 brothers and 5 sisters. In his later life, he and his three brothers had set up a club for intellectuals, which they hosted at their house. Bose obtained a B.Sc. Honors in Chemistry from Calcutta University, and then an MBBS degree from Calcutta Medical College in 1910. He then pursued a Master’s degree from the new Department of Psychology at Calcutta University. After working as a lecturer for a few years in the same department, he pursued a D.Sc. (Doctor of Science) degree, wherein he wrote his thesis titled ‘The Concepts of Repression’. During the 1930s, he started a training program in psychoanalysis, attracting minds from all over the country to be trained in psychoanalytical training.

Bose is also credited with initially driving mental health services in India. India’s first psychiatric outpatient department, the psychiatric unit at Carmichael Medical College, was set up by Bose in May 1933. He also started a private nursing home and clinic in February 1940, which later attained mental hospital status under the Lunacy Act of 1952, and was renamed Lumbini Park Mental Hospital. Beyond this, he was involved in various other training programs, and establishing institutions – all of which formed the bedrock of mental health services in India and set the didactic supervision style often used in the country even today.

== Life and work ==
Bose's doctoral thesis, Concept of Repression (1921) blended Hindu thought with Freudian concepts. He sent the thesis to Freud, which led to a correspondence between the two men and to the formation of the Indian Psychoanalytic Society in 1922 in Calcutta. Of the fifteen original members, nine were college teachers of psychology or philosophy and five belonged to the medical corps of the Indian Army, including two British psychiatrists. One of them was Owen A.R. Berkeley Hill, famous for his work at the Ranchi Mental Hospital. In the same year, Bose wrote to Freud in Vienna. Freud was pleased that his ideas had spread to such a far-off land and asked Bose to write to Ernest Jones, then President of the International Psychoanalytic Association, for membership of that body. Bose did so and the Indian Psychoanalytic Society, with Bose as president (a position he held until his death in 1953) became a full-fledged member of the international psychoanalytic community. The review of the Indian Psychoanalytic Society is called Samiksha and its first edition appeared in 1947.

== Published Work ==
Several of Bose’s published works have been geared toward understanding psychoanalysis in the Indian context, and applying the same to mental health patients. His 1921 doctoral thesis, “Concept of Repression” outlined his theory of opposite wishes, which was a mix of Newtonian physics and Hindu thoughts, different from the Freudian concept of repression. Bose classified all impulses and life activities into X impulse (active phase – the tendency to act upon, give energy to, or otherwise modify the environment) and Y impulse (passive phase – tendency to receive energy or be modified by the environment). Bose argues that a contradictory wish is not a logical negation, like A does not want to beat B, but a contest between the active and passive roles – the desire to beat being opposed by being beaten.

In his thesis, Bose likened psychological energy to the physics concept of energy and talked about a stimulus as an object, and the physics concept of reaction similar to the response that occurs in the subject, with reaction (response) being equal to stimulus and of opposite sign. Another physical analogy was likening the theory of opposite wishes to an elastic bag, where when water is pumped into a bag, it stretches and the outward pressure (tendency to discharge) grows proportionally to the inflow of water – similar to one wish intensifying its opposite. This was his attempt to explain his psychological theory by likening it to well established concepts in Physics.

In the same paper, he also argued that all wishes are originally pleasurable and unpleasantness is not a primary quality of a wish, but rather arises from the conflict or struggle between competing pleasurable impulses (often one being conscious and the other being unconscious). When one of the wishes is realized, its counterpart remains latent but can only be genuinely annihilated through satisfaction. When applying it to psychoanalytic treatment, he talked about how bringing a repressed factor into view was not enough for stability. Rather one wish would be stronger than its counterpart and then weaker, like a pendulum (going from X to Y to X), until a balance was achieved.

Bose also spoke about the importance of castration complex resolving the Oedipus complex in a different way than Freud. He said that the complex started with an active wish to castrate rather than dread/anxiety. The child’s fantasy is to castrate the father, reducing him to a female role. This later transforms into a fear of castration. He wrote about these differences based on the observations he made when treating patients in India.

Another central work by Bose was “A New Theory of Mental Life”, published in the International Journal of Psychoanalysis. According to his theory, he expanded on his earlier work and said that every wish thar arises in an individual has two parts, which are exact opposites of each other. Moreover, one of the parts is conscious while its counterpart is unconscious. Both wishes need to be satisfied, and his theory posited that the conscious wish is satisfied by appropriate action whereas the unconscious wish is satisfied by identification/acknowledgement. If only one member of the pair is satisfied, the person experiences an internal tension which remains till the counterpart gets satisfied. He further commented that this forms the basis of retaliation and punishment in the individual as well as the society. He uses the following example when explaining the application of the theory in an interpersonal context – if person X hits person Y, X’s wish to hit is satisfied and Y’s wish to be hit is satisfied. This in turn raises a wish in Y to strike X, while simultaneously raising a wish to not strike X.

He went on to explain that his theory of the opposite wish was important for the analyst to understand, as it was a way to understand repression. He said that unpleasant emotions, such as shame, are results of repression, not its cause; on the other hand, a person experiences pleasure when both of the opposite wishes are free to operate. Multiple secondary sources also mention Bose arguing about something he termed ‘theoretical ego’, which was an alternate to Freud’s tripartite division of mind into Id, Ego, and Superego. Unfortunately, the primary source of this theory was not traceable, and therefore this is the only information we have.

Bose’s 1949 article titled ‘Ambivalence’, and 1951 article titled ‘The Nature of the wish’ talk about the importance of ambivalence in human psyche, and the subsequent importance of the ‘double wish’ or ‘see-saw’. Bose challenged the framing of ambivalence as mixed emotions like love and hate. He argued that every active wish created an inverted, passive counterpart. Drawing from the Indian philosophical concept of Dvanda, he reinterpreted the Oedipus complex and psychological tension through these opposite desires rather than the framework of defense mechanisms laid out by Freud.

Sex and Anxiety, Bose’s 1952 article is another relevant work of his career. In this paper, he discusses several clinical cases and formulate a theory that is similar to Freud’s early paradigms. Similar to his previous work, he attempts to provide non-western psychoanalytic explanations to clinical cases. He argues that anxiety and sexual tension are, at their root, identical states and therefore can be converted into one another. He talks about the anxiety symptoms experienced by his patients and how they could be traced to repressed or blocked sexual wishes. Connecting it with his central theory on opposite wishes, he theorized that when the dominant sexual wish (active wish) arises, there is an opposite passive desire as well. Anxiety is often the byproduct when these opposite wishes collide and fail to balance out within the individual’s psyche. This paper is often viewed as the concluding ‘chapter’ of a trilogy of papers published by Bose in his final year before death. The previous two papers were titled ‘analysis of wish’ and ‘pleasure in wish’. This ‘trilogy of papers’ can be seen as Bose’s theoretical synthesis in the indigenization of Western psychoanalysis to better fit to the cultural and philosophical background of the Indian context.

Other relevant works by Bose include ‘Svapna’ – a book on dreams, originally written in Bengali and later translated into French to be uploaded in the Freud archive. His article on ‘illusion’ is also discussed in Spearman’s (1937) book, Psychology down the ages. Bose has also written a fictional literature book titled Lalkalo, and a commentary on ancient Yoga Sutras titled ‘Purana Prabesh Patanajali Yoga sutra, Bhagwat Gita’. While a large part of Bose’s career was dedicated clinical work and upgrading the mental health treatment facilities in India, his scholarly work set a strong foundation for future scholars to adapt non-Indian frameworks into the Indian cultural context.

== Relevance to Modern Psychology ==
While Bose’s work is not directly used for mental health treatment today, he lay a foundation for the decolonial psychological work coming out of India, and the potential of international collaboration for the same. Bose is also responsible for setting up various initial mental health facilities as well as professional societies in India, thereby propagating the psychology movement in India. His central tenet seemed to be upgrading treatment for mental health patients in India, whether that be through field work, professional outreach, or publishing scholarly work adapting frameworks to the Indian context.

Bose’s key contribution was refusing to accept Freud’s psychoanalysis universalist theories uncritically. He spoke about how concepts like castration anxiety looked different for Indian patients. Within counseling psychology, we know this as culturally adapted practice today and have a lot of modern research on the same. He also wrote about psychology in regional languages, making it accessible and relatable to more people, thereby making an effort to bring mental health awareness in the masses. His Bengali books (Svapna and Manobidyar Paribhasha) do not include much jargon, which was his attempt at making psychology more inclusive. Bose also established the fact that good ideas could flow from India and other, non-Western, locations to the world. His opposite-wishes theory preceded the later theories of projective identification and intersubjectivity, showcasing that non-Western traditions can be sources of theory rather than just their recipients.

He drew from philosophy, physics, spiritual scripture, and medicine, to inform psychological theories and practice. We have seen some examples of the same in modern psychology – such as Buddhist meditation practices that are used in psychological therapy as mindfulness.

== Works ==
- Concept of Repression. Published by G. Bose, 14 Parsi Bagan, Calcutta, India. 1921.
- (with Ernest Jones and others) Glossary for the use of translators of psycho-analytic works, 1926
- Bose, G. (1930). "The psychological outlook of Hindu philosophy". Indian Journal of Psychology. 5: 119–46.
- Bose, Girindrasekhar. (1933). "A New Theory of Mental Life". Indian Journal of Psychology, 37(157).
