= Mohitlal Majumdar =

Bengali Poet, literary critic and essayist (1888–1952)

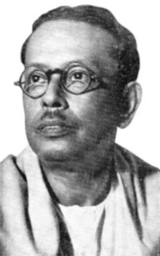
- Mohitlal Majumdar
- Born: 26 October 1888; Kanchrapara, Nadia, Bengal Presidency, British India (now in North 24 Parganas district, West Bengal, India)
- Died: 26 July 1952 (aged 63); Calcutta, West Bengal, India
- Occupations: Author, Critics, Professor
- Writing career
- Notable work: Bishorini

Mohitlal Majumdar (Bengali: মোহিতলাল মজুমদার; 26 October 1888 – 26 July 1952) was an Indian poet and essayist in the Bengali-language. He began his journey as a poet, but later became literary critic.

== Life ==
Majumder was born in a Baidya family on 26 October 1888 in the village of Kanchrapara in Nadia district, India at his maternal uncle's house(Kanchrapara is now in North 24 Parganas district). His native village was Balagarh in Hooghly District of present-day West Bengal. He graduated in arts in 1908 from Ripon College (now Surendranath College), Kolkata. He began his career as a teacher at Calcutta High School in 1908 and continued in this profession until 1928. He also worked briefly as a kanungo (1914-1917) in the Settlement Department. He joined University of Dhaka, now in Bangladesh as a lecturer in the Bengali and Sanskrit Department in 1928 and retired from there in 1944. His present house is in a state of ruin at Chongarbon.

== Writing career ==
Mohitlal Majumder made his literary debut through the journal "Manasi". Later, he contributed regularly to journals such as the Bharati and Shanibarer Chithi. His early poems, written in pleasing rhythms, reflect the aspirations and sorrows of a dreaming youth. Acquainted with Arabic and Persian, he used Arabic and Persian words in his poems. In pre-Nazrul era, he was the user of Arabic and Persian words. His poems are inspired by both aestheticism and spiritualism.

Mohitlal early poems reveal the influence of Rabindranath Tagore, but later, as a member of the Shanibarer Chithi group, he distanced himself from the older poet.

As a literary critic, Mohitlal attempted to set standards and reveal the problems of art and literature. His psychological and poet-like approach greatly elevated the status of criticism. In writing critiques he used a number of pseudonyms such as Krittivas Ojha, Sabyasachi and Sri Satyasundar Das.

Swapan Pasari (1921), Smargaral (1936), Adhunik Bangla Sahitya (1936), Bangla Kavitar Chhanda (1945), Kavi Shri Madhusudan (1947), Sahitya Bichar (1947), Bangla O Bangali (1951), and Kavi Rabindra O Rabindrakavya (1st Vol. 1952, 2nd Vol. 1953).

=== Poetry ===
- Swapan Pasari [pushpo jibon] (1921)
- Bishorini
- Swaragaral (1936)
- Hemanta Godhuli
- Robi pradakshin
- Milanotkantha

=== Essays ===
- Adhunik Bangla Sahitya (1936)
- Kobi Sri Madhusudan (1947)
- Sahitya Bichar (1947)
- Sahitya katha (1938)
- Bichitra katha (1941)
