= K. C. Nag =

Indian mathematician (1893–1987)

Keshab Chandra Nag
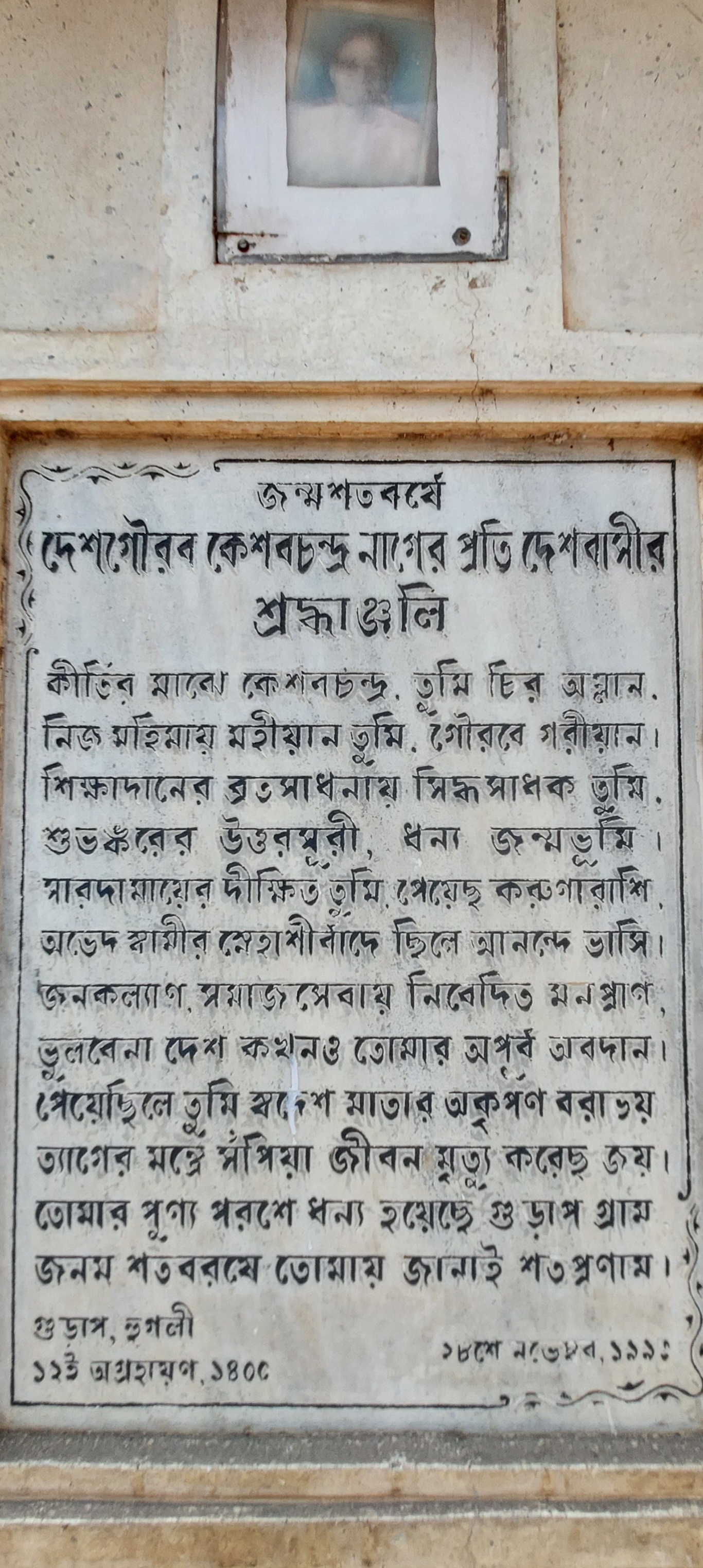
- K.C Nag memorial at Gurap
- Born: 10 July 1893 Gurap, Hooghly, Bengal, British India (present-day West Bengal, India)
- Died: 6 February 1987 (aged 93) Kolkata, West Bengal, India
- Occupation: Mathematician, School Teacher of Mitra Institution and writer of many mathematics books.
- Genre: Mathematician
- Literary movement: Indian Freedom Movement
- Spouse: Laxmimani Debi

Keshab Chandra Nag or K.C. Nag (Bengali: কেশবচন্দ্র নাগ) (10 July 1893 – 6 February 1987), was an Indian Bengali mathematician, author of various mathematics textbooks and educator.

== Early life ==
K. C. Nag was born in Nagpara, Gurap, Hooghly, Bengal, British India (present-day West Bengal, India) on the holy day of Rath Yatra, 10 July 1893. His Father was Raghunath Nag and Mother Khiroda Sundari Debi. He lost his father at an early age of three. He was only cared for by his mother.

== Education ==
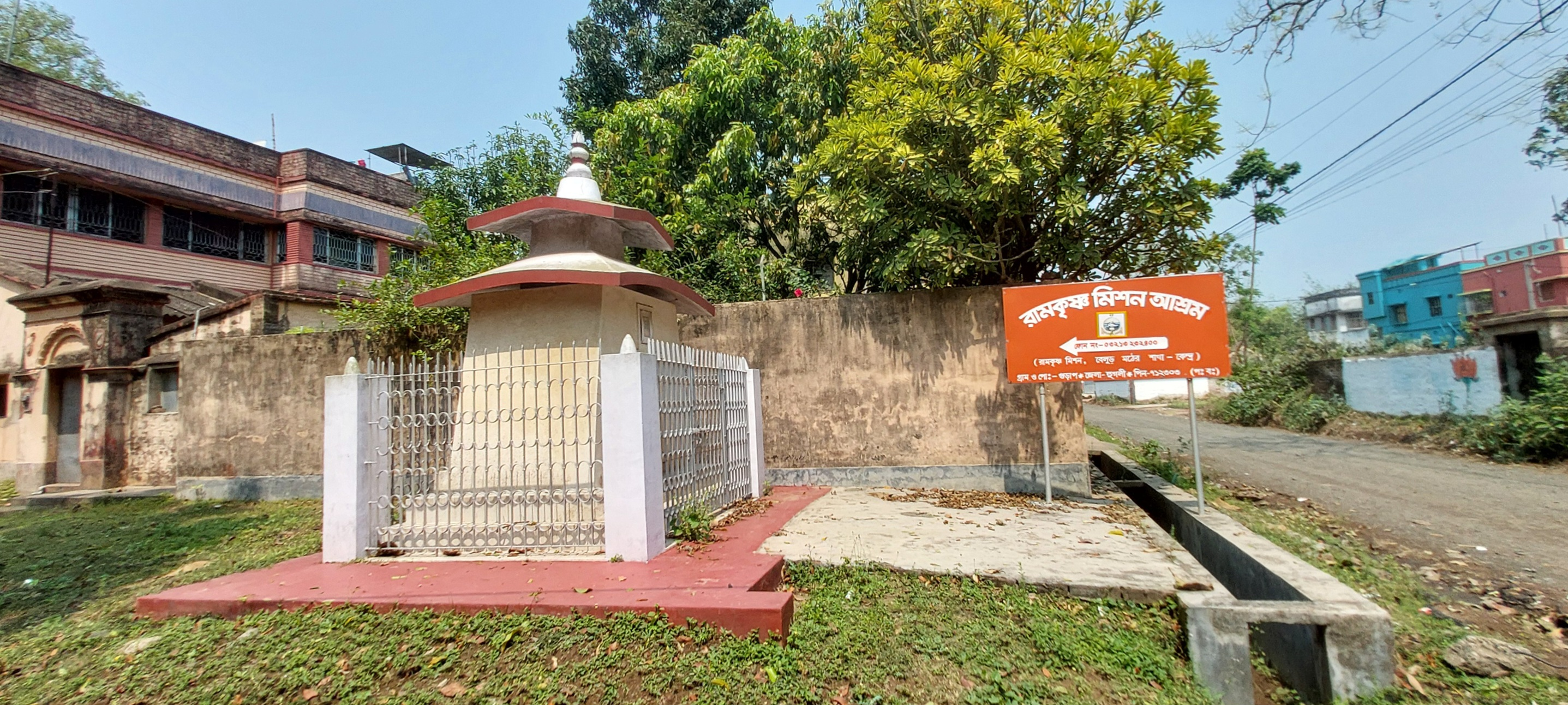
Memorial near the house of K.C. Nag at Gurap

Keshab Chandra Nag started his education in a Bengali Medium School at his village in Gurap. At that time that was the only school at Gurap. From Class VII he changed his school to Bhastara Yojneshshar Uccha Vidyalaya (Yojneshshar High School), 3 miles from his village. He would start walking early in the morning to reach his school and came back home at evening every day. In Class IX he got admitted to Kishenganj High School. In 1912, he passed the entrance examination with a First Class and joined Ripon College (now Surendranath College), Kolkata, in Science. In 1914, he passed the I.Sc examination with a First Class. After this due to severe financial crisis he had to discontinue his education and start earning money.

=== Working life ===
He started his career as Third Master in Bhastara Yojgeshshar Uccha Vidyalaya. He also did private tuitions when teaching there. His family was dependent on him but he resigned from his job to pursue higher studies. In 1917 he passed B.A with Mathematics and Sanskrit. He then received a job offer from Kishenganj High School as a Mathematics Teacher. He taught for some time in that school, after which he got another offer from Baharampur Krishnanath Collegiate School and joined the school as a mathematics teacher. In 1919 he got Diksha from Ma Sarada Devi. During that time the Maharaja of Kasimbazar (Cossimbazar) Manindra Chandra Nandi was a great admirer of Keshab Chandra. Maharaj allowed Keshab Chandra to use his vast library. In that library, he studied extensively about the history of India and especially the history of mathematics. At first, he lived in a mess at Rosa Road in Kolkata. From 1964 he started to live at his own house at Gobinda Ghoshal Lane in South Kolkata.

=== Meeting with Ashutosh Mukhopadhyay ===
In 1905 Sir Ashutosh Mukhopadhay established Mitra Institution (Branch) in Bhowanipore so that the students of South Kolkata can also get chance to study in that school. In 1906 Sir Ashutosh Mukhopadhay became the Vice Chancellor of Calcutta University and tried to bring various teachers from different parts of India to establish Calcutta University as one of the best universities of India. Similarly, he tried to bring teachers to Mitra Institution (Branch). Sir Ashutosh heard about Keshab Chandra, and he took him to Mitra Institution, Bhabanipur as a mathematics teacher. Due to his way of teaching mathematics Keshab Chandra came very close to Sir Ashutosh . Dr. Shyamaprasad Mukhopadhay son of Sir Ashutosh became a very good friend of Keshab Chandra and requested him to join politics which Keshab Chandra declined.

== Mathematics books ==
In 1909 Sir Ashutosh along with his teacher Shyamacharan Bose wrote a book titled "Arithmetic for Schools". After the death of Sir Ashutosh, his son Shyamaprasad Mukhopadhay took the initiative to revise that book and requested Keshab Chandra to help him. After an untiring effort of Keshab Chandra Nag along with a few mathematicians in 1937, a revised edition of the book was published in the name "Patiganith". Kabisekhar (কবিশেখর) Kalidas Roy was a colleague of Keshab Chandra Nag. There was a regular gathering of various stalwarts in the field of academics and literature like Sarath Chandra Chattopadhyay, Premendra Mitra etc. was held at Kabisekhar's House, Keshab Chandra was a regular to that gathering. One day Sarat Chandra Chattopadhyay requested Keshab Chandra to write a mathematics book. After a few days, the same request came from Kabisekhar. Keshab Chandra was very confused whether to write the book or not and ultimately decided to write it for the benefit of students. His first book was Nava Patiganit (নব পাটিগণিত) from U.N. Dhar & Sons. Within a short time, this book became very famous among the students of class five and six. In the year 1942 Matric Mathematics, one of the famous books of K.C. Nag was published by the publisher Calcutta Book House. After this, he wrote many more books for various classes from IV to XII. These books were published in Bengali, English, Hindi, Urdu, and Nepali language. His younger son Late Taraprasad Nag started his own publishing house named "Nag Book House". This publishing house has now been renamed as " Nag Publishing House" and is managed by his grandson Dr. Tridibesh Nag. Tridibesh did his B.E. in Electrical Engineering and M.E from Jadavpur University. After this, he took over the publication and took every measure to ensure that the mathematics books by the legendary "K.C.Nag" never lost its reputation. His sole motive was to see to it that the students are not deprived of the privilege of learning mathematics from K.C. Nag's maths books. K.C. Nag's books from class 4–12 are the books which the students aspiring to excel in every walk of life had depended on at some time or other for the past three generations. Tridibesh formed a board consisting of eminent professors, school teachers, examiners, and successful students in order to revise the book from time to time.
