= Chandravati (poet) =

Chandravati চন্দ্রাবতী
- Born: 1550; Kishoreganj, Bengal (now in Bangladesh)
- Died: 1600 (aged 49–50); Kishoreganj, Bengal
- Occupation: Poet
- Parent(s): Dwija Bangshidas Bhattacharya, Anjana Devi

Chandrabati (Bengali: চন্দ্রাবতী) was a medieval Bengali poet, widely considered as the first known female poet of Bengali language. She is best known for writing the Bengali version of the ancient epic Ramayana from a woman's perspective.

== Biography ==
Chandravati was born in a Bengali Brahmin family to Dwij-Banshidas Bhattacharya and Anjana Devi, in circa 1550 CE in the village of Patuyari, on the banks of the Fulesshori river in Kishoreganj which is currently located in the Dhaka Division of Bangladesh. Bansidas was a composer of Manasa's ballads known as Manasar Bhasan. According to Sambaru Chandra Mohanta, he was one of the composers of Manasamangal Kavya.

Chandravati was the first woman from the Indian subcontinent to compose the Ramayana in Bengali language. She also composed Malua and doshshu kenaram. She narrated the Ramayana from Sita's point of view and criticized Rama. Chandravati is a highly individual rendition as a tale told from a woman's point of view which, instead of celebrating masculine heroism, laments the suffering of women caught in the play of male ego. She however couldn't finish her work.
