= Kashiram Das =

15th century Bengali poet & translator of Mahabharata

- কাশীরাম দাস
- Born: Singi, Katwa, Bardhaman, Bengal
- Occupation: Poet
- Writing career
- Language: Bengali
- Genre: Poetry

Kashiram Das or Kāśīrām Dās (Bengali: কাশীরাম দাস, pronounced [ka.ʃi.raˑm d̪aˑʃ]; born 16th century) is an important poet in medieval Bengali literature. His Bengali re-telling of the Mahābhārata, known as Kāśīdāsī Môhābhārôt, is a popular and influential version of the Mahābhārata legend in Bengal. Although the entire work is intra-textually ascribed to him, most scholars agree that he composed only the first four of the eighteen books (parvas). As with the Rāmāyaṇa of Kṛttibās Ojhā, Kāśīrām freely removed elements and added other legends to the story. Dās is not a last name and is a title meaning 'servant' of god.

== Life ==
Kashiram Das was born into a Bengali Kayastha Vaishnava family in the village of Singi, near Choto Meigachi, adjacent to Katwa in the undivided Bardhaman district (Now Purba Bardhaman). His death anniversary is still commemorated in the region. Kashiram was the second son of Kamalakanta Das; two of his brothers were noted poets on their own, in the Vaishnava Padavali tradition. His elder brother Ghanashyam Das, is the author of Srikrishnavilas, and his younger brother, Gadadhar, composed Jagannathamangal. Although Kashiram's topic was outside the mainstream Krishna legend, his work is stylistically in the same tradition and uses the payar chhanda (payar metre).

There is some doubt regarding his birthplace. It appears that Kamalakanta left the Bardhaman area (at the time known as Indrani Pargana) and had settled in Orissa, so it might be that Kashiram was born in Orissa and then returned to Bengal (Midnapore) at a later stage.

As a Sanskrit and Vaishnava scholar, Kashiram was patronised by a zamindar family in Midnapore, and ran a pathshala (small school) there. In addition to the Kashidasi Mahabharat, he is cited to have composed several works, including Satyanarayaner Punthi (the book of Satyanaryan), Svapna-Parba (dream reverie), and Nalopakhyan (tale of Nala), which are now lost.

== Kashidasi Mahabharat ==
It is said that he was inspired to embark on composing a Bengali version of the Mahābhārata after a recitation of the Sanskrit text at his patron's home. He may have been guided in this enterprise by his teacher Abhiram Mukhuti of Haraharpur.

It is quite clear that the first four parvas—ādi, sabhā, vana, and virāṭā—were composed by him around the turn of the 16th century. The vanity refrain at the end of the virata parva gives the date of its composition as the shaka year 1526 (1604 CE). He had embarked on the next book, the vana-parva, but it is thought that he may have died shortly thereafter, and the remaining books were completed by his son-in-law, nephew, and other relatives, who followed the same style and even retained the 'Kashiram Das' vanity line after each chapter. The entire work was completed around 1610 AD.

Kashiram Das had named his text Bharata-Pā̃cālī, where Bharata refers to the Bharata dynasty, and pā̃cālī refers to the narrative song tradition of Bengal. The pā̃cālī works attempt to tell a story that will keep the audience's interest. In this spirit, Kashiram Das avoids the long philosophical discourses that are part of the Mahābhārata, such as the entire discourse of Kṛṣṇa to Arjuna (the Bhagavadgītā). On the other hand, he elaborates the story of Mohini—the female avatar of Viṣṇu who enchants Śiva—based on a two-line śloka in the original.

Although other Bengali Mahābhāratas had been composed earlier (for example, Kavindra Mahabharata, 1525), the Kashidasi Mahabharata soon became the staple of Bengali Mahābhārata readings. Composed in the mangalkavya tradition, the vanity refrain has become a staple of Bengali tradition:

môhābhārôter kôthaā ômṛtô sômān
kāśīrām dās kôhe śune punyôbān

This is translated to: "The Mahābhārata tales are like amrita, says Kashiram Das; it brings merit to listen to it."

Other phrases that have become part of the Bengali folklore include "krodhe pāp, krodhe tāp, krodhe kulôkṣôẏ;" ("anger causes sin, anger causes heat, anger causes the demise of one's line").

When the Serampore Mission Press was started in the 19th century, the Kāśīdāsī Môhābhārôt in parts were among the first Bengali texts to be printed. Eventually, the complete text, edited by Jayagopal Tarkalankar, was published in 1936 by the same press.
