= Vijay Gupta (poet) =

Vijay Gupta (Bengali: বিজয় গুপ্ত) was a 15th-century Bengali poet from Barisal. He was part of a revival of Bengali literature in the late 15th century and early 16th century.

== Biography ==
Gupta was born in Agailjhara, Barisal, in the 15th century into a Bengali Baidya family. His father was Sanatan Gupta and his mother was Rukmini.

Gupta is believed to be the second writer (Kana Haridattar is believed to be the first) to write about the goddess Manasa. He wrote poems and epics eulogizing Manasa and spreading her worship in Bengal. He wrote Manashamanga (Padmapuran) about Manasa. The poem narrates how a devotee of Shiva came to worship Manasa, and how Muslims began venerating her to avoid her wrath. The story also spoke about Alauddin Husayn Shah, who ruled from 1494 to 1519, and was an independent Sultan of Bengal. His writings also spoke about trading in Bengal and various ports Bengal traded with.
