= Subodh Sarkar =

Indian Bengali poet, writer and editor

- সুবোধ সরকার
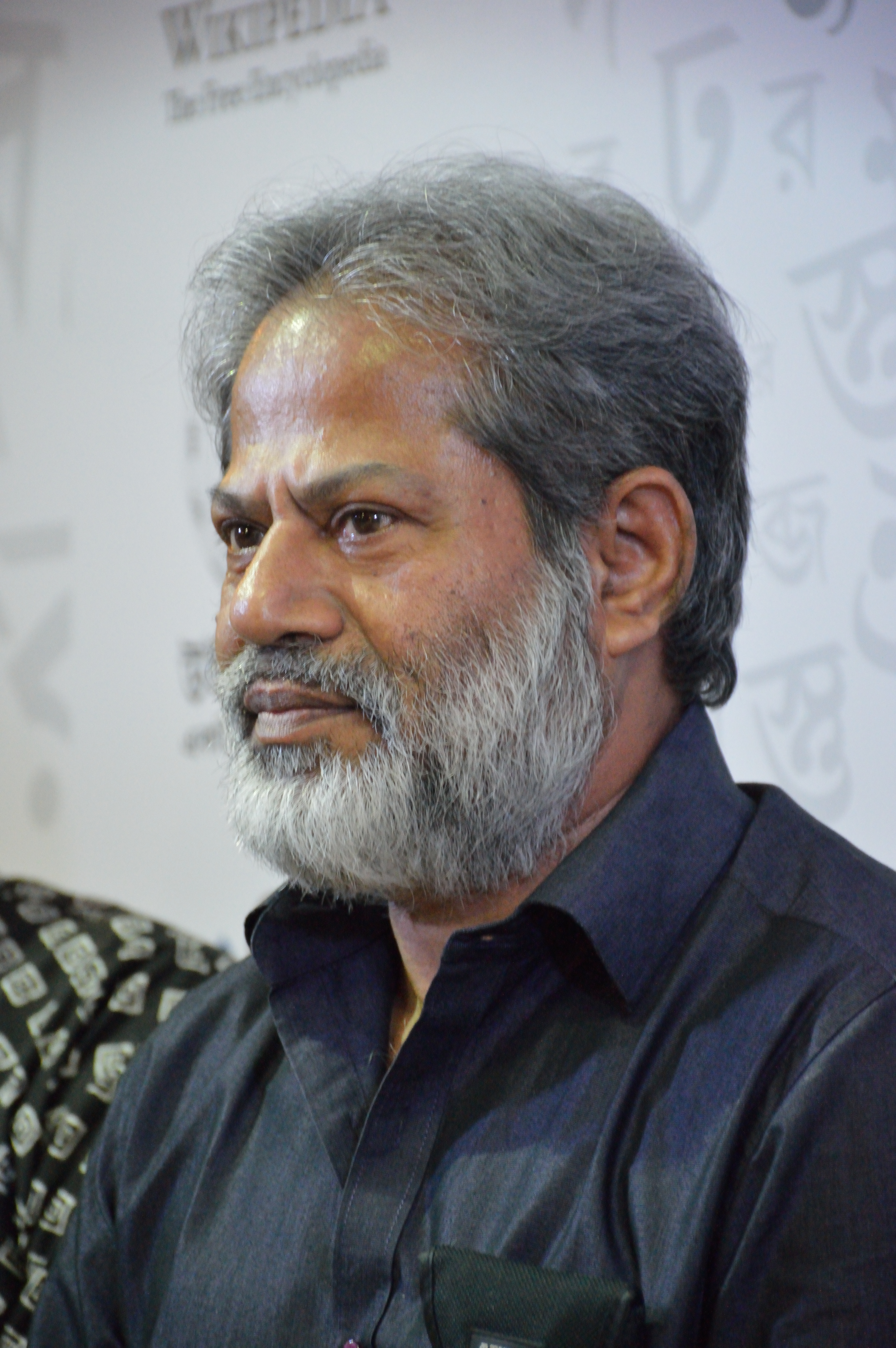
- Sarkar in October 2015
- Born: 28 October 1958 (age 67); Krishnanagar, West Bengal, India
- Education: University of Kalyani and Calcutta
- Occupations: Poet; writer; editor
- Spouse: Mallika Sengupta

Subodh Sarkar (born 28 October 1958) is a Bengali poet, writer and editor, and a reader in English literature at City College, Kolkata. He is a recipient of the Sahitya Akademi Award.

== Biography ==
Born into a refugee family from East Pakistan in 1958 in Krishnanagar — a District town, known for its cultural heritage — in Nadia District of West Bengal, Subodh Sarkar is an Indian- Bengali poet, editor, translator and academic. When he was in class eight, his father died. He wrote in an autobiographical essay, 'my second meal was uncertain every day at that time'. But the ensuing crisis could not prevent him. He recalled his running away from the hospital as his father died. He ran and ran with a hospital-dog following him all along till he reached home – reminiscent of the Mahabharata as he later realized. Death as a theme has influenced him a lot. Though he was able to cope with the death of his father, but his wife poet Mallika Sengupta’s death left him devastated as revealed in his poetry. Till then it has been an unsettling experience for him.

As a Fulbright Scholar, Subodh Sarkar has taught English at City College, Calcutta University and briefly at the University of Iowa, USA. His PhD is on the 'hyphenated identities' of Indian American women writers writing in English.

He has displayed a penchant for the mixture of Indian poetry and Western poetry.

With the first book of poems, published in the late 70s, while he was in college, he shot up to a kind of private fame which led him to write books in quick succession. After 50 years of his writing career, he has now 49 books of poems and two novels in verse, one of which is written in sonnets to become the first novel in Bengali in sonnets and other publications including books of essays, translations and travelogues. Among his books of poems mentions must be made of 'Rikhsya Mesh Kotha’, ‘Valo Jaigata Kothay?’, ‘Ami Karo Andhakar Noi’, ‘Manipurer Ma’, ‘Nakshatrer Jama’, ‘Belur theke Basonapur’.

His signature book, 'Dwaipayan Hrader Dhare (On the Side of The Lake Dwaipayan) published in 2010, won him the Sahitya Academy Award in 2013.

His ‘Manipurer Maa’, written in 2006, has created a turmoil in the Bengali intelligentsia because of its honest treatment of the theme and the severe criticism of the Indian Army in the North East with special power not to account for any military action.

Subodh Sarkar's poetry marks a distinct shift from previous Bengali literary traditions. Influenced by Latin American poets such as Pablo Neruda and Nicanor Parra, his work incorporates local and national themes. His poetry frequently focuses on social issues, addressing the experiences of marginalized groups and criticizing political figures.

In an interview, he clarified: ‘In the mid-70s, when I was still at school, the Naxalite movement broke out … Every day, on my way to school, I used to find abandoned dead body in the wood which I had to cross every morning. This is how I had to negotiate between bloodshed and books on my back. After that, I grew up and came to the city of Kolkata with a job of a lecturer in a city college. My days in the city constantly clashed with my days in the small town. I was perennially going through the turmoil of a metamorphosis. I was walking out of my old self. This old self and the new self were thrown into a war zone which shaped out my sensibilities. And this war was a base camp for my poetry. If there is no conflict, my sensibilities get benumbed and cannot wake up for poetry.’

A controversial name no doubt, but Subodh seems to have been one of the most popular names in Bengali households as his poems like 'Sari', ‘Behalar Chheleta’, ‘Lakshmi’, ‘Sita’, ‘Ami Firoza’, ‘Baba’, ‘Mayurpangkhi’, ‘Rupam’, 'Belur' have been the mouthpieces of the young generations. He has experimented a lot with the form of poems. He has also been described by many as the chief exponent of the Bengali anti-Poetry movement at its highest level. For him, ‘Message in a poem may be a pain in the arse. Putting message in the cup you are drinking from has not been a good drink. You are not a saint, you are a poet, you may cry, but you have no tears. If you philosophize your poetry, then philosophy will reign, and poetry will vanish. When I write a poem, I have no agenda except my sensibilities. I obey my heart, I listen to my skin, I support my ears, I can also hear what I cannot say.’

As he has been associated with Sahitya Academy for a long time, he was closely connected with the Indian poets of other Indian languages as well. It may be noted that the second volume of his 'Complete Poems', published by Ananda Publishers, was dedicated to five Indian poets – Hindi poet Kedarnath Singh, Kannada poet-playwright Chandrasekhara Kambara, Gujarati poet Sitangshu Yashashchandra, Malayalam poet K. Satchidananda and Manipuri poet Ibomcha Singh. This is how he brings in the miliue of Indian poetry to his Bengali books. His editorials in Indian literature, published by Sahitya Academy epitomize his deep involvement with the Indian literature in all its inclusiveness.

Asked by an interviewer: 'Do you remember your first recognition as a poet? He replied, ‘I was at Krishnanagar Railway station with some of my schoolmates, not to board any train, but to while away time by watching busy passengers rushing in and out. A vagabond was loitering on the platform behind us, possibly looking for some food. A train was approaching the station. We took safe position, not to be jostled by passengers. All of a sudden, in a flash of a moment, the vagabond jumped before the approaching train. There was a roar followed by a silent count down. We thought he was finished, but to our utter surprise we came to find him on the second platform, eating bread from a small packet he picked up from rail lines. I looked at him through the empty space between two compartments; he looked back at me with a queer deathly smile on the corner of his lips. I wrote my first poem that night about the smile. I lost my first poem, which was appreciated by my friends, after reading it to them the next day. That was my first recognition, which died with the disappearance of the poem. But that smile continued to smile for last 50 years of my career as a writer. This is the smile that made me what I am today. I cannot write a single poem without remembering the smile. That smile is hunger, that smile is Asia. That smile is Africa, Latin America'.

He is both practical and elusive, he said in a poem: 'I like to slap Gandhi and Marx/ they gave you profound theories but no roties'.

His poems have been translated into English, Spanish and several Indian languages and published in several journals and anthologies. For him, ‘Translation is the visa to a language in which you do not exist. Whenever I find my poems translated in a foreign language, I feel I have a reason to be elated, I realise that my poem gets another life in another language. It’s a big thing. Translation, in its own manner of being in existence, is a power … The role of the translator is as significant as that of an ambassador. Europe cannot be Europe without the translations of Homer and Sophocles. India, till date, remains unknown in India without translation.’

He is the editor of Bhashanagar, a Bangla culture and poetry magazine with occasional English issues. In 2010, he was appointed as the Editor of Indian Literature, the flagship journal of Sahitya Akademi, New Delhi, he also guest-edited the journal for some time. He has been now the chairman of the Paschimbanga Kabita Academy, the first of its kind in the country, instituted by the Government of West Bengal in 2016. He travelled to Australia, Canada, China, Greece and many other countries to read his poems. He visited Russia and Turkey as a member of the Indian Writers’ delegation from Sahitya Academy in 2010.

Sarkar has won several awards and titles. He received the Shakti Chattopadhyay Binodan Vichitra Puraskar (1997), D.Lit. from G. B. University and Vidyasagar University of West Bengal, Gangadhar Meher National Award for poetry from Sambalpur University, Bangla Academy Anita-Sunil Basu Puraskar from Paschimbanga Bangla Academy, Nazrul Award from Kabi Sangshad of Bangladesh to name e few. He is also recipient of Bangabhushan from the Govt. of West Bengal. Recently he was honoured with Rabindra Puraskar (Tagore Award), State's highest award for Literature from the Government of West Bengal.

His faith is the faith in poetry. At IWP at the University of Iowa, while a Spanish painter was drawing his portrait live, asked him a mega question 'what is your religion'? He wryly smiled and curty said, 'my religion is poetry'. His penultimate destination is to write an absolute poem in which his idea of the Republic of poetry will be capsulated. A line of his poem says: 'Moonlight cannot wash away your sin, but it can make you cry in the desert'.

== Select Bibliography ==
=== Poetry ===
- Kabita 78-80. Kolkata: Krishnanagar: Oasis, 1980
- Rikkha Mesh Katha. Howrah: Abhiman, 1983
- Sohag Sharbari. (Co poet Mallika Sengupta) Howrah: Abhiman, 1985
- Eka Narakgami. Kolkata: Pratibhas, 1988
- Maronottar Jol. Kakdwip: Shatabdir Mukh, 1990
- Chandradosh Osudhe Sare Na. Kolkata: Pratibhas, 1991
- Marubhumir Golap. Medinipur: Amritalok Sahitya Mandir, 1991
- Arai Haat Manush. Kolkata: Boipara, 1993
- Chhi. Kolkata: Ananda Publishers, 1993
- Rajneeti Korben Na. Kolkata: Pratibhas, 1997
- Bhalo Jaygata Kothay. Kolkata: Ananda Publishers, 1999
- Dhonyobad, Marichika Sen. Kolkata: Katha O Kahini, 1999
- Sob Rasta Rome Jay Na. Kolkata: Patralekha, 2001
- Jerusalem theke Medinipur. Kolkata: Sristi, 2001
- Kallu. Kolkata: Ananda Publishers, 2002
- Krittikay Sonnet Kangaroo. Kolkata: Saptarshi, 2003
- Shreshtha Kabita. Kolkata: Dey’s Publishing, 2003
- Ami Karo Andhakar Noi. Kolkata: Pratibhas, 2004
- Manipurer Ma. Kolkata: Ananda Publishers, 2005
- Ja Upanishad, Tai Koran. Kolkata: Ananda Publishers, 2006
- Pratibader Kabita. Kolkata: Deep Prakashan, 2007
- Prem O Pipegun. Kolkata: Aajkal, 2008
- Choddo Nombor Deadbody. Kolkata, 2009
- Dwaipayan Hrader Dhare. Kolkata, 2010
- Chheleke Firiye Din Amake. Kolkata: Saptarshi, 2011
- Ektu Aschhi, Roroke Dekho. Kolkata: Signet Press, 2012
- Dhoper Chop. Kolkata: Signet Press, 2013
- Meyeder Toilete Ki Korchhilam. Kolkata: Pratibhas, 2013
- Kabita Samagra-1. Kolkata: Ananda Publishers, 2014
- Subodh VS Subodh. Kolkata: Pratibhas, 2015
- Plato theke Paoli Dam. Kolkata: Kriti Karigor, 2016
- How To Be a Good Communist. Kolkata: Kagojer Thonga, 2016
- Kabita Samagra-2. Kolkata: Ananda Publishers, 2016
- Tin Minute Baish Sekende Biplob Ase Na. Kolkata: Signet Press, 2017
- Baisakhi O Bob Dylan. Kolkata: Signet Press, 2018
- Natun Premer Kabita. Kolkata: Signet Press, 2019
- Diner Bela Dekha Jay Na. Kolkata: Signet Press, 2020
- Nakshatrer Jama. Kolkata: Signet Press, 2021
- Irabati Ase Irabati Chole Jay. Kolkata: Pratibhas, 2022
- Hiranmoy Volcano. Krishnanagar: Mudra, 2022
- Sholo Patar Bikel. Kolkata: Darabar Jayga Prakashana, 2022
- Kobita Jokhon Golpo. Kolkata: Kotha O Kahini Prakashani, 2022
- Sa. Kolkata: Signet Press, 2023
- Ekti Chumbon Ekti Dinamite. Kolkata: Signet Press, 2023
- Belur theke Basonapur. Kolkata: Signet Press, 2024

=== Novel ===
- Uddam Rajanir Kabya, A Novel in Vers, Ananda Punlishers, Kolkata ,2023
- Falgun Dassyur Kabya, A Novel in Sonnets, Howakal New Delhi 2024
- Pitridugdho, Signet Press, Kolkata, 2024.

=== Translations ===
- Bharatbarsher Dike, ed., Pratibhas Kolkata Blashphemy 2013 Kolkata
- Not in My Name, Authorpress New Delhi
- In My Bustard English Kolkata Letterpress Kolkata

=== Essays ===
- Amar jibon Amar Kobita, Prativash, Kolkata
- Nirbachito Sakkhatkar (Selected Interviews), Kolkata Letterpress
- Rabindranath Jodi na Janmaten, Deys Publishing, Kolkata

=== Travelogue ===
- Deshta America, Vostak,1995

== A Chronology of Life ==
1958 Born at Krishnanagar, Nadia, West Bengal.

1968 Food movement, Krishnagar was a center, as a boy he witnessed three young ptotesters drop dead in the middle of the road due to indiscriminate police firing.

1970 Naxalite tension in Krishnagar. Academic sessions were halted. Political murder was a daily affair.

1974 Passed Higher Secondary. His first poem was published in 'Virus', a magazine edited by poet Debdash Acharya.

1977-78 passed English Honours. Poems of 'Rikshya Mesh Kotha' were written during his exams and he dropped out. Next year he passed.

1979 passed MA in English from Kalyani University.

1980 Started doing PhD on Graham Greene, but discontinued.

1981-85 published a number of books in rapid succession.

1985 After a courtship for 5 years, married to Mallika Senguta who was a noted poet in her own right.

1985 Joined a North Bengal College in Dhupguri as a lecturer 1986 Resigned from his permanent position from Dhupguri College and became a derelict.

1987 -88 unemployed with a permanent address in Kolkata.His wife was at a Kolkata college as a lecturer.He came into contact with Subhas Mukhopadhayay. Nirendranath Chakroborty, Sunil Gangopaddhay, and Sakti Chattopadhayay who reshaped his intellectual mind for poetry.

1988 Appointed as permanent Lecturer of English language and literature at City College, a Bramho college in Kolkata where Poet Jibanananda Das taught and was forced to resign from his post.

1989 He started working on Allen Ginsberg and his Indian connection. 1990-91 He participated in a couple of young poets meets at Bharat Bhavan, Bhopal and came into contact with young Indian poets.With Mallika Sengupta He started editing Bhashanagar, a journal Of Indian poetry in Bengali translation, the first of its kind in Bengali at that time.

1992 Roro, his only son was born. For the first time in his life he boarded a flight and landed at JFK, New York to work with Allen Ginsberg to write a book on his Indian connection. It opened a window to the global poetry.

1994-2000 a number of books published during this period. Attended International readings and seminars abroad .

2001 Received Bangla Academy Award from Buddhadev Bhattacharya, the then Chief Minister of West Bengal. 2002-06 a couple of books published during this years and he remained invisible in public space and he was totally focussed on his poetry. Mallika, his wife was diagnosed with cancer. After treatments in Kolkata he took her to America for check up, and American doctors said her medical treatment was protocol- wise done. 2008 'Choddo number deadbody' published, a book of poems which centered around the incidents at Nandigram which unsettled the Communist Government of West Bengal. 2010 Editor of Indian Literature. 2011 Mallika, his wife passed away while his son was writing HS exams.

2012 PhD from the University of Calcutta.

2013 Sahitya Academy Award

2014 He withdrew his support from CPM and supported Mamata Banerjee for her concern for the downtrodden. He has never been a member of any political party. 2015 D.Litt. from the University of Gour Banga and D.Litt. from the Vidyasagar University.

2016 Appointed as the first President of Paschimbanga Kabita Academy.

2016 : Joined the International Writing Programme (IWP) at the University of Iowa, USA.

2016 Awarded Fulbright Fellowship.

2016 Brifly taught post colonial literatures in the department of English at the University of Iowa.

2018-22 Convener of Bengali Advisory Board, Sahitya Akademi.

2023 visit to America on invitation 2024 visit to America again

2024 Visit to China on official invitation.

2025 'Belur theke Basonapur' his latest book of poems published at the Kolkata Book Fair to mark his writings for 50 years.

== Awards and honours ==
- Sahitya Akademi Award (2013) for Dwaipayan Hrader Dhare
- Banga Bibhushan

== List of publications ==
Books of poems:

- Chihh, Kolkata, Ananda Publishers, 1993, ISBN 81-7215-246-9
- Bhalo Jaygata Kothae, Kolkata, Ananda Publishers, 2001,ISBN 81-7215-916-1
- Manipurer Ma, Kolkata, Ananda Publishers, 2005, ISBN 81-7756-485-4
