= Biharilal Chakraborty =

Bengali poet and composer (1835–1894)

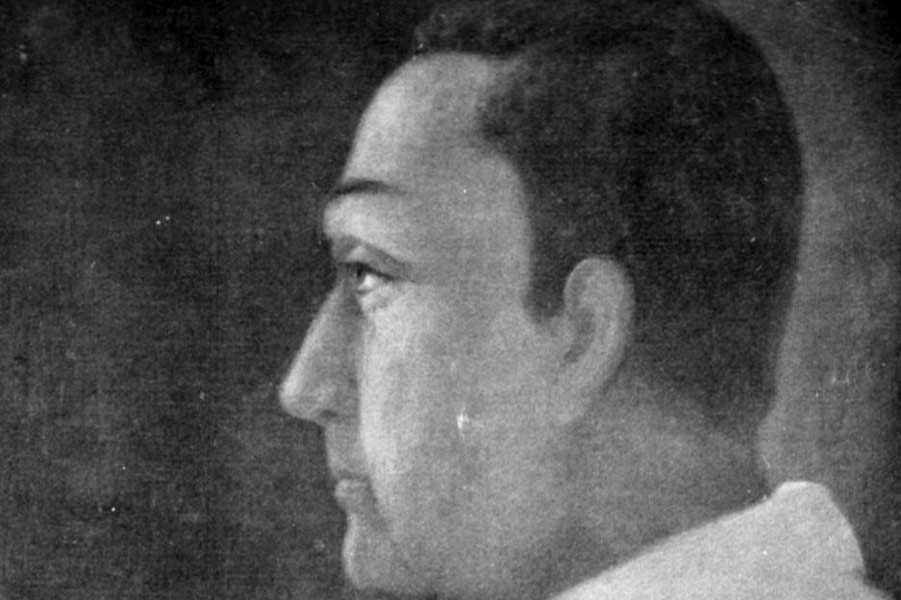
- Born: 21 May 1835; Jorabagan, Calcutta, British India (present-day India)
- Died: 24 May 1894 (aged 59); Calcutta, Bengal, British India
- Occupations: Poet, Journalist

Biharilal Chakraborty (Bengali: বিহারীলাল চক্রবর্তী) was a Bengali poet and music composer. He is often considered the pioneer of musical poetry in Bengali literature. Rabindranath Tagore was influenced by the works of Biharilal Chakraborty and named him "Morning Bird" of Bengali literature.

== Biography ==
He was born on 21 May 1835 in Jorabagan, British India (present-day India). He had profound knowledge of Bengali, English and Sanskrit. He died on 24 May 1894.

== Publications ==
His notable collection of poetry includes Banga Darshan, Banga Sundari, Bandhu Biyog, Premabahini, Sangeet Shatak, Shadher Ashan, Nishargasandarshan, and Sharadamangal Kabya. He was editor of Purnima, Sahitya Shankranti and Obodhbondhu literary magazines.
