= Paschimbanga Natya Akademi =

Theatre organization of India

- logo
- Abbreviation: PBNA
- Formation: 26 September 1987; 38 years ago
- Headquarters: Natya Bhaban, Kolkata
- Location: West Bengal, India
- Region served: West Bengal, Tripura
- Official language: Bengali
- Parent organisation: Department of Culture and Information Affairs, West Bengal Government

Paschimbanga Natya Akademi, is a learned society for drama and theatre in West Bengal, India. Established on 26 September 1987, it is a wing of the Department of Information and Cultural Affairs, Government of West Bengal. The aim of this society is to develop skill and expertise, to document and archive the history of Bengali theatre, to disseminate information, to understand theories, as well as to promote and project significant creativity in the field.

== Overview ==
The Natya Akademi conducts annual theatre festivals, seminars, public lectures, training workshops and publishes research works and books on Bengali drama. It confers Dinabandhu Puraskar and Girish Puraskar, two of the most prestigious theatre awards in the state, for production playwriting, acting, direction, stagecraft and design, and music.

The Natya Akademi owns a number of theatre halls including Academy of Fine Arts (Lady Ranu Mukherjee Mancha), Bijon Theatre, Girish Mancha, Jogesh Mime Akademi, Madhusudan Mancha, Mahajati Sadan, Muktangan Rangalaya, Rabindra Sadan, Sisir Mancha, Sujata Sadan, Tapan Theatre and University Institute Hall.

The Natya Akademi publishes Natya Akademi Patrika, an annual journal featuring academic essays, lectures, obituaries, play scripts, archival reprints, reports etc. It has also produced classics including William Shakespeare's Chaitali Rater Swapno (directed by Utpal Dutt), Girish Chandra Ghosh's Balidan (directed by Ashoke Mukhopadhyay) and Rabindranath Tagore's Chirakumar Sabha (directed by Bibhash Chakrabarty) etc.

== List of presidents ==
Presidents
- Manmath Roy, 1987–88
- Debnarayan Gupta, 1889-2000
- Gnanesh Mukhopadhyay, 2000-2006
- Kumar Roy, 2000-

Presidents

== See also ==
- Paschimbanga Bangla Akademi
- Manoj Mitra, the current president of Paschimbangya Natya Akademi
