= Health Services Laboratories =

Health Services Laboratories (HSL) is an independent provider of pathology and diagnostic services to the NHS. Formed in 2015, it is a partnership between The Doctors Laboratory, University College London Hospitals NHS Foundation Trust and the Royal Free London NHS Foundation Trust. The Doctors Laboratory is the longest-established specialist provider of clinically-led pathology services in the UK and is based in central London. It is owned by Sonic Healthcare, an Australian company providing pathology and radiology services.

HSL's flagship laboratory, the Halo, is based at 1 Mabledon Place, in the heart of London's 'med-city', and is one of the largest pathology laboratories in Europe. Currently in development, it is spread over 11 floors with five split-level basements. The facility will be home to more than 1,000 staff working within a connected suite of laboratories spanning more than 100,000 square feet. The Halo will also have dedicated clinical and non-clinical cores for vertical connectivity. Its other laboratories include rapid response laboratories (RRLs) at Mortimer Market, 60 Whitfield Street, the Royal Free London and North Middlesex Hospital. HSL provides services to a number of NHS trusts. It does not provide services to individuals on a commercial basis.

Lord Carter of Coles chairs the HSL board.

The Doctors Laboratory was an early adopter of noninvasive prenatal testing. It started using Roche Diagnostics's Ariosa Diagnostics Harmony test in late 2012.

In May 2017 a report to the North Middlesex University Hospital NHS Trust, which uses the company's services, outlined a rise in incidents reported during the transition to the brand new laboratory. HSL and North Middlesex worked in close partnership to resolve these early teething issues.

In the COVID-19 pandemic in England the firm had £60 million in contracts mostly for PCR testing services in the new Surge Capacity Laboratory in MedCity. Profits were more than £10 million, up from £1.9 million the previous year.
