= Sujata Sadan =

General information
- Type: Theatre auditorium
- Location: 107 Harish Mukherjee Road, Kolkata, India

Technical details
- Floor count: Single

Sujata Sadan is a theatre auditorium in Kolkata, West Bengal. The theatre auditorium is located at 107 Harish Mukherjee Road, Kolkata 700026.

== Theatre ==
The theatre was named after Sujata Devi. The theatre is not as popular as other theatres in Kolkata like Sisir Mancha, Girish Mancha, Academy of fine arts. The one floor auditorium is comparatively small in size. But, it is said, the auditorium is very good for Intimate theatre.

== Selected plays ==
Here a list of selected plays staged in Sujata Sadan.

=== Swapnasandhani plays ===
- Ajke Aamar Chhuti
- Bhalo Rakshosher Golpo
- Bhoy
- Birpurush
- Bankubabur Bandhu
- Dakghor
- Darjiparar Marjinara
- Hargaj
- Malyadan

=== Other theatre groups ===
- Aandhare ekla by Chetana.
- Pragoitihasik by Gotraheen (Dum Dum)
- Katha Manobi by Niva Arts.
- Aadim Aranya by Gandeeb Natyam.
- Agamir Opare by Othoi Natyodol.
