= Paschimbanga Bangla Akademi =

Official Bangla language authority in India

- পশ্চিমবঙ্গ বাংলা আকাদেমি
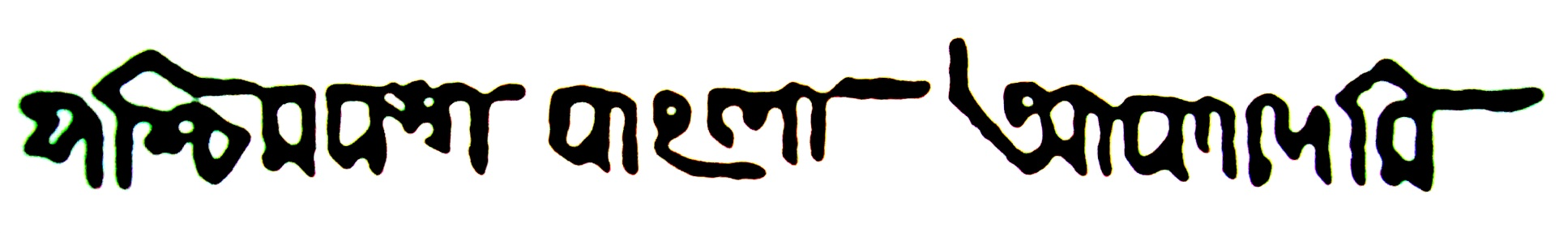
- Logo

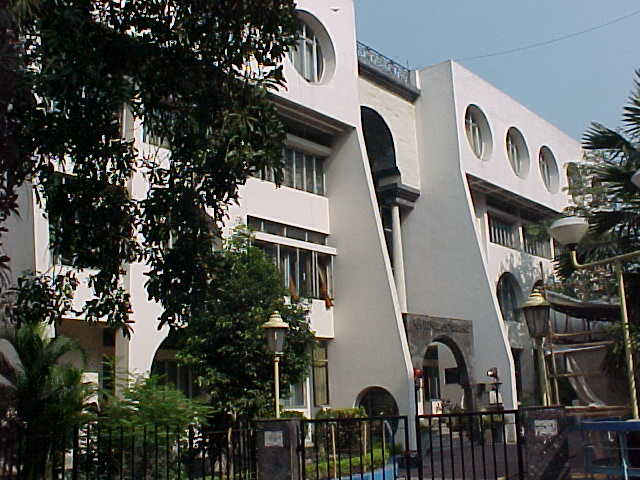
- Head Edifice of Pashchimbanga Bangla Akademi in Kolkata, India
- Abbreviation: PBA
- Pronunciation: [pɔʃtʃimbɔŋɡo baŋla akad̪emi]
- Named after: Académie Française; Bangla Academy
- Formation: 20 May 1986; 40 years ago
- Type: Autonomous governmental body
- Legal status: Official language regulator
- Purpose: Reforming Bengali spelling and grammar, compiling dictionaries, encyclopediæ and terminologies, and promoting the Bengali language and culture in West Bengal
- Headquarters: Rabindra Sadan and Rabindra-Okakura Bhawan
- Location: Kolkata, West Bengal, India
- Region served: West Bengal, Tripura, Barak Valley
- Official language: Bengali
- President: Bratya Basu
- Parent organization: Department of Information and Cultural Affairs
- Funding: Government of West Bengal
- Website: pbba.wbicad.in

Paschimbanga Bangla Akademi (Bengali: পশ্চিমবঙ্গ বাংলা আকাদেমি, pronounced [pɔʃtʃimbɔŋɡo baŋla akad̪emi]) is the official regulatory body of the Bengali language in India. It was founded on 20 May 1986 in Kolkata to act as the official authority of the language and is entrusted with the responsibility of reforming Bengali spelling and grammar, compiling dictionaries, encyclopedias and terminologies and promoting Bengali language and culture in West Bengal. They are widely accepted by the Governments of West Bengal and Tripura as well as a considerable number of private publishing houses and institutions such as the Oxford University Press and the Ramakrishna Mission.

The institute is housed in two separate buildings, one is Nandan-Rabindra Sadan Complex in South Kolkata and the other Rabindra-Okakura Complex at Bidhannagar. Annadashankar Roy became the first President and Sanat Kumar Chattopadhyay the first secretary of the academy. Pashchimbanga Bangla Akademi has been successful in extending its activities and programs to different districts of West Bengal and even to other states in India. In Kolkata, The organization hosts different programs in collaboration with such bodies like Bengal literature council and National Academy of Letters.

== History ==
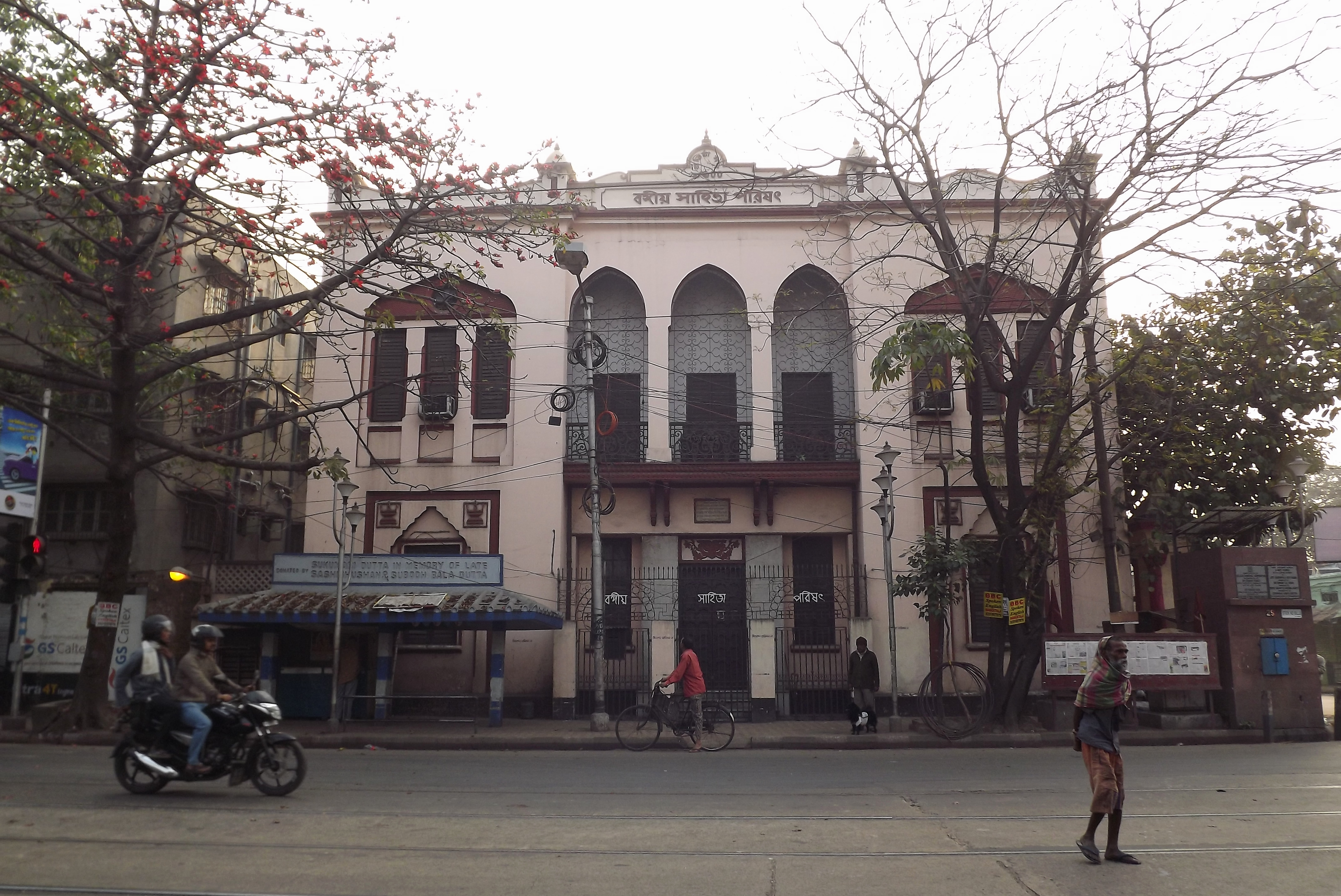
Bangiya Sahitya Parishad - Kolkata

=== Origins ===
Bengal Academy of Literature, the first academic association to regulate and promote Bengali language and literature was set up in Kolkata under the chairmanship of Benoy Krishna Dev in 1893. In April 1894, the academy was reorganized and rechristened as Bangiya Sahitya Parishad, and Romesh Chunder Dutt became the first president of it. Scholars like Chandranath Bose, Dwijendranath Tagore, Jagadish Chandra Bose, Prafulla Chandra Roy, Satyendranath Tagore, Haraprasad Shastri, Ramendra Sundar Trivedi later served the Parishad as presidents. Rabindranth Tagore (Vice-president: 1894–96, 1901, 1905–1909, 1917; Special Delegate: 1910) himself was closely associated to the institution since its inception.

Bangiya Sahitya Parishad is the first academic institution on matters pertaining to Bengali language. It endeavored to compile standard Bengali dictionary, grammar and terminologies, both philosophical and scientific, to collect and publish old and medieval Bengali manuscripts, and to carry out translation from other language into Bengali and research on history, philosophy and science. During the 20th century, the affairs concerning the promotion of Bengali language did not remain a sole responsibility of Bangiya Sahitya Parishad. As language prospered and literature enriched, a need of linguistic reform as well as an authority to enforce the reforms was felt by the scholars of the time. In the late 1930s, Rabindranath Tagore asked the University of Calcutta to determine the rules of Bengali spelling and Shyama Prasad Mukherjee, the then Vice-Chancellor of the university, set up a committee to look over the subject in November 1935. In May 1936, a standard rule for Bengali spelling was first imposed. These rules were later amended by Rabindranath Tagore and other scholars and practiced at academic level in all over Bengal for next 70 years. After the partition of Bengal in 1947, the Bangla Academy in Dhaka was established in 1955 by then governor of East Pakistan A. K. Fazlul Huq. In the 1990s, the Paschimbanga Bangla Akademi introduced standardized regulations for Bengali spelling. In West Bengal, various prominent institutions backed the process of development of the language, but that resulted in inconsistencies in it. For example, Rajsekhar Basu and Ananda Bazaar Patrika tried to simplify Bengali spelling; but instead of rationalizing the spelling system, it aroused controversy over the authority of such bodies. Even institutions like Visva-Bharati University failed in the task. In 1962, the Government of West Bengal started using Bengali for all official purposes. Since then, a need for an official regulator of the language has been felt. In 1986, with the general consent of Bengali intellectuals of the time, the Government of West Bengal inaugurated the Pashchimbanga Bangla Akademi as a wing of the Information and Cultural Affairs Department. Afterward it was converted into a society and registered under Societies Registration Act. On 8 December 1994, it was declared an autonomous governmental body.

== Structure and function ==
Presidents
- Annadashankar Roy, 1986–2002
- Asitkumar Bandyopadhyay, 2002–2003
- Nirendranath Chakravarty, 2003–2011
- Mahashweta Devi, 2011–2012
- Shaoli Mitra, 2012-2018
- Bratya Basu, 2018-2026

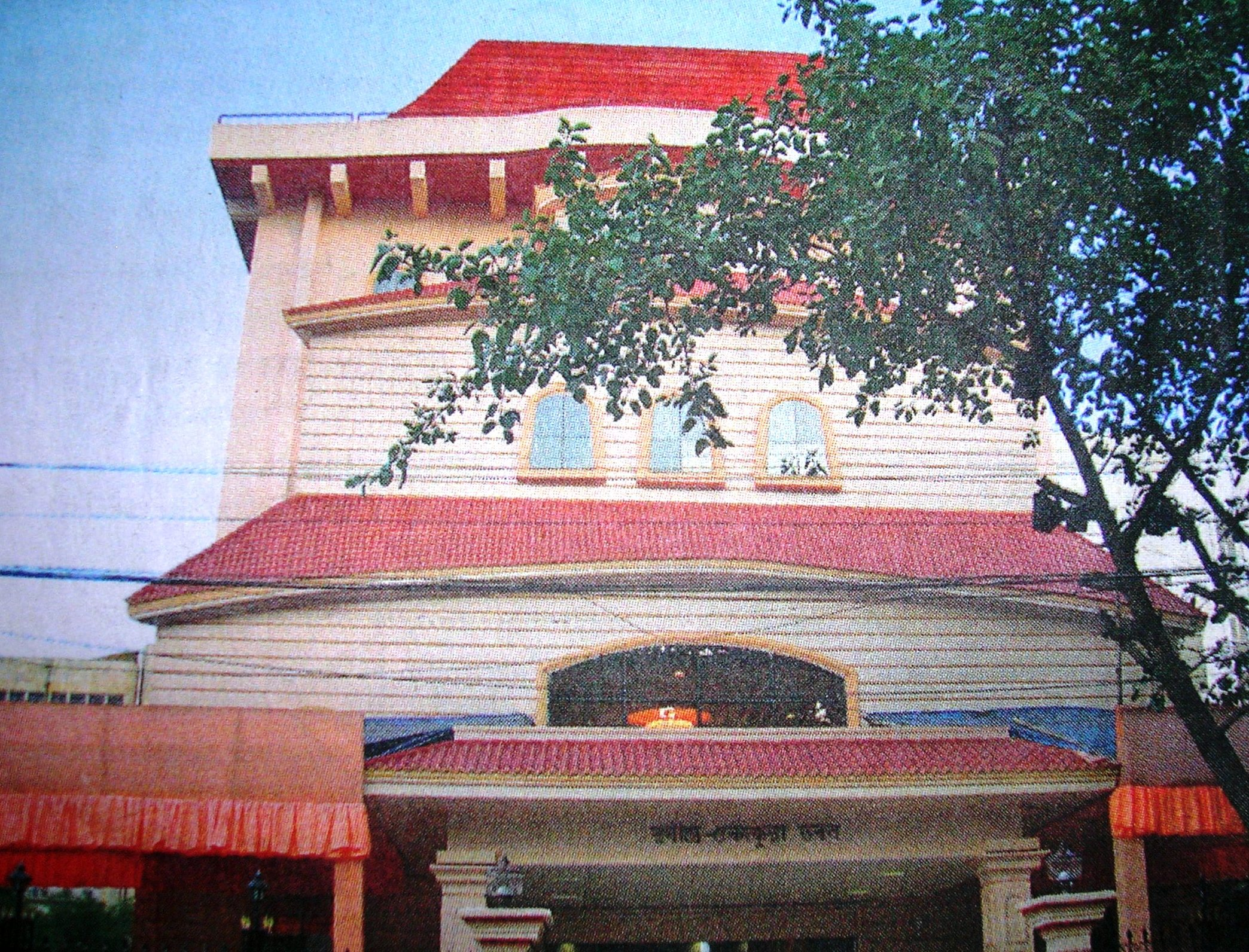
Rabindra-Okakura Bhaban at Bidhannagar, India. It is the academy's second building

The academy is the official authority on Bengali language in West Bengal; although its recommendations carry no legal power, but still the educational boards and the universities of West Bengal and Tripura have deep regard for its rulings. The institution furthermore accomplishes all its activities in close liaison with other academic and educational institutions including universities engaged in various aspects of Bengali language, literature and culture across India. Apart from its own programs, it also arranges programs in cooperation with different such societies. Such activities are not confined to Kolkata only, but also in districts and sub-divisions, even in the other states.

At the time of its foundation, the academy had 30 members in its Karma Samiti (Working Committee) and 78 in General Council including the government delegation. The chairman is called Sabhapati and Vice-Chairman is called Saha-Sabhapati. Members, officially known as Sadasyas, remain in the academy for life. However, any member can resign from his office by his will. In 2007, after the Nandigram massacre, some of academy members including Sankha Ghosh and Ashru Kumar Sikdar resigned from the academy. There is also a post of Secretary, or Sachib, who is the chief governmental delegation at the Akademi. The office of the Secretary of the academy is held by Sanat Kumar Chattopadhyay since its inception.

The members of the first Working Committee were was established immediately after the foundation with Annadashankar Roy was the inaugural president of the academy. The committee consisted of 25 bureaucrats including, Leela Majumdar and Bhabatosh Dutta.

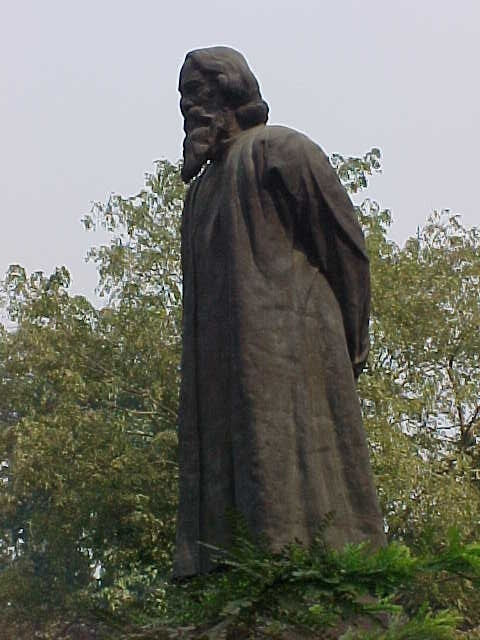
Statue of Rabindranath Tagore at Nandan

The members of the first General Council were consisted of 55 intellectuals and linguists of West Bengal with notable figures like Nisith Ranjan Ray, Rabindra Kumar DasGupta, Arun Mitra, Satyajit Ray, Malini Bhattacharya, Mohit Chattopadhyay, and Purnendu Patri. The council reported to the secretary of West Bengal's ministry of information and cultural affairs. The function of the academy was initially settled by a seminar held at Sisir Mancha, West Bengal from 24 February to 1 March. These seminars determined the rationale of the institution and proposed to make a design and blue print to achieve its goals. The Academy Spelling Sub-Committee was created to reform and rationalize Bengali orthography in India. This Sub-Committee includes Nirendranath Chakravarty, Sankha Ghosh, Pabitra Sarkar, Jyoti Bhushan Chaki, Nirmal Das, Ashok Mukhopadhyay, Subhash Bhattacharya, Amitabha Chowdhuri, Amitabha Mukhopadhyay, Sourin Bhattacharya, Prasun Dutta, Sanat Kumar Chattopadhyay, Arun Kumar Basu, and Shubhomoy Mondal. On the recommendation of this Sub-Committee, the academy did its historical reforms on Bengali spelling. Another important sub-committee is the Terminology Sub-Committee which is entrusted to compile standard Bengali terminology for both academic and administrative purposes. This sub-committee includes Ananda Ghosh Hazra, Alapan Bandyaopadhyay, I.A.S., Krishno Dhar, Jyoti Bhushan Chaki, Nirendranath Chakravarty, Pabitra Sarkar, Sanat Kumar Chattopadhyay, Swapan Chowdhuri and Bhabatosh Tapadar. Editorial boards are generally founded to edit works of great authors. One of such bodies that compiled the Complete Works of Kazi Nazrul Islam, Syed Waliullah and Michael Madhusudan Dutt. The board was embodied with 15 members including Annadashankar Roy and former chief minister Buddhadeb Bhattacharya.

Scholars at the institute work and research on spelling, grammar and the origin and development of Bengali. They have published works by prominent writers in the language. They have built a large library to preserve original manuscripts. The government of Japan has donated 500,000 rupees for research in the academy. The academy is spending the money on the Indo-Japan Cultural Center in Bidhannagar. Pashchimbanga Bangla Akademi has furthermore developed a Bengali font designed according to the changes made by them in the Bengali script.

== Awards awarded by Paschimbanga Bangla Akademi ==
- Rabindra Puraskar

== Selected bibliography ==
=== Dictionaries and terminologies ===
Cover of the Bangla Akademi Spelling Dictionary

- Akademi Bidyarthi Abidhan (Bangla Akademi Bengali Dictionary for Students)
- Akademi Banan Abidhan (Bangla Akademi Spelling Dictionary)
- Paribhasha Sankalan – Prashashan (Collection of Administrative Terminologies)
- Sahityer Shabdartho-Kosh (Dictionary of Literary Terms)
- Bhasha-Tattwer Paribhasha (Terminology of Linguistics)
- Byutpatti-Sidhyartha-Bangla Kosmh (Dictionary of Bengali Word Origin)
- Bangla Bhashay Arthaniti Charcha Granthapanji (Catalogue of Economic Studies in Bengali)
- Bangla Bhashay Itihaas Charcha Granthapanji (Catalogue of Historical Studies in Bengali)
- Dhatubidya Paribhasha (Terminology of Metallurgy)
- Saontali-Bangla Samashabda Abidhan (A Dictionary of Santali-Bengali Identical Words)

=== Complete and selected works of legendary authors ===
- Sanchayita, Vol. II, (Ed. By Arun Kumar Basu) – an alternative anthology of Tagore Poems other than Sanchayita
- Manik Bandyopadhyay Rachana Samagra, (Ek-Ekadash Khanda) – Complete Works of Manik Bandopadhyay, Vols. I-XI
- Manik Bandyopadhyay Kishor Rachana Sambhar, (Ed. By. Parthojit Gangopadhyay) – Collected Juvenile Literature of Manik Bandopadhyay
- Kazi Nazrul Islam Rachana Samagra (Ek-Saptam Khanda) – Complete Works of Kazi Nazrul Islam, Vols. I-VII
- Budhhadeb Bose Prabandha Samagra (Ek-dui Khanda) – Complete Essays of Budhhadeva Basu, Vols. I-IV
- Nirendranath Chakravarty Gadya Samagra (Ek-Tritiya) – Complete Prose Works of Nirendranath Chakravarty, Vols. I-III
- Rezaul Karim Prabandha Samagra – Complete Essays of Rezaul Karim
- Jyoti Bhattacharya Prabandha Samagra – Complete Essays of Jyoti Bhattacharya
- Dwijendra-Giti Samagra – Complete Songs of Dwijendra Lal Roy
- Somen Chanda Nirbachito Galpa Sangraha – Selected Stories of Somen Chanda
- Samparka (Sampriti Bishayak Galpa) – Samparka: Stories on Communal Harmony (Ed. By Ashok Kumar Mitra and Bishnu Basu)

=== Collected essays ===
- Bhasha-Bhabna: Unish-Bish Shatak – Thoughts on Language, A Collection of 37 Essays on Bengali dated from 1850 to 1950.
- Prasanga Bangla Byakaran, Prothom Khanda- On Bengali Grammar, Vol. I, (20 essays on Bengali grammar from old periodicals)
- Prasanga Bangla Byakaran, Dwitiyo Khanda- On Bengali Grammar, Vol. II, (Contemporary Essays on Bengali Grammar)
- Saraswat – A History of Bengali Literary Academies (Ed. By Arun Kumar Basu)
- Bangalir Gaan – Songs of Bengal, A Golden Treasury of Bengali Music (Ed. By. Durgadas Lahiri)
- Akademi Pratishtha Barshiki Bhashan Sankalan – Akademi Collection of Foundation Day Lectures
- Akademi Bhashan Sankalan – Akademi Collection of Lectures
- Puratan Gadyagrantha Sangraha – Collection of Old Texts (Ed. By Dr. Asit Kumar Bandyaopadhyay)
- Sangbad-Samayikpatre Unish Shataker Bangali Samaj (Ek-Dui Khanda) – Nineteenth Century Bengali Society in Periodicals, Vols. I-II (Col. & Ed. By Swapan Bose)
- Manaswi Annadashankar – Annadashankar Roy, A Great Thinker (Ed. By Dhiman Dasgupta)
- Bangla Primer Sangraha – A Collection of Bengali Primers (Ed. By Ashish Khastogir)

== Criticism ==
In May 2022, the academies decision to give Bangla Akademi Literature Award to Mamata Banerjee for her poems was met with fierce criticism. Mamata Banerjee in the end gave back the prize.

== See also ==
- Bangla Academy
- Paschim Banga Natya Akademi
- Annadashankar Roy
- Bangiya Sahitya Parishad
- University of Calcutta
- Rabindranath Tagore
- Manipuri Sahitya Parishad
