= Bangla Academy (disambiguation) =

Bangla Academy may refer to:

- Bangla Academy – the national language authority of Bangladesh.
- Paschimbanga Bangla Akademi – the Bangla language authority in Kolkata, India.
