= Jennifer Musa =

Pakistani politician of Irish descent

- Born: Bridget Jennifer Wren; 11 November 1917; Tarmons, County Kerry, Ireland
- Died: 12 January 2008 (aged 90); Balochistan, Pakistan
- Occupations: Politician and Social worker
- Spouse: Qazi Musa
- Children: Ashraf Jehangir Qazi (son)

Jennifer Musa (née Bridget Jennifer Wren; 11 November 1917 – 12 January 2008) was an Irish-born Pakistani nurse, politician, social worker and the wife of Qazi Musa. She was often nicknamed the "Queen of Baluchistan" and "Mummy Jennifer".

== Early life and career ==
Jennifer Musa was born Bridget Jennifer Wren at Tarmons, Tarbert, County Kerry, Ireland in 1917. She left Ireland and trained as a nurse 1936-1940 as Southgate Isolation Hospital, London. She registered as a nurse with the General Nursing Council in 1940 and remained on the register until at least 1943. In 1939, she met prominent politician Qazi Muhammad Musa, brother of Qazi Muhammad Essa, a prominent activist in the Pakistan Movement while studying at Oxford. Qazi Musa was the eldest son of the Prime Minister to the then Khan of Kalat (present-day Kalat District). Jennifer Musa took the name Jehan Zeba and married Qazi Musa the following year despite the opposition from his Hazara clan. The couple moved to Pakistan in 1948.

Jennifer Musa used to say, "We met at his college, at a party – you know what students are like. I was a Catholic, he was a Muslim. I think I became Islamic at the time ... I married into a progressive family and never wore a veil, they never asked. I just came here with my husband because he belonged here." While living in Baluchistan, she often used to wear traditional shalwar kameez and wrap a shawl around her.

After Qazi Musa's sudden death in a car accident in 1956, Jennifer Musa decided to settle permanently in her husband's hometown of Pishin. She joined the National Awami Party of Khan Abdul Wali Khan and was elected to Pakistan's first Parliament in 1970 after the 1970 Pakistani general election. During that time, she often clashed with Prime Minister Zulfiqar Ali Bhutto. Jennifer Musa thought Bhutto was 'a clever fellow and a strange chap'. She found it difficult to get along with him.

== Legacy and social work ==
She had one child, Ashraf Jehangir Qazi, who is a senior Pakistani diplomat.

Jennifer Musa, also called "Mummy Jennifer" took up social work after seeing the plight of young girls in this desperately poor region. She went on to found the 'Pishin Women's Association' in her local area. She used to say, "I worked with all the people, even with my bad Urdu. I feel very much like I am at home here, they have always treated me like one of themselves. I couldn't have gone back to Ireland. I know more about this place now than I do about my home."

In one of her last interviews, she had said, "Mummy has had her innings." Jennifer Musa lived for 60 years in Balochistan until her death on 12 January 2008. In July 2024, a plaque in her honour was unveiled in Tarbert.
