= Asit Kumar Bandyopadhyay =

Historian of Bengali literature

Asitkumar Bandyopadhyay
- Born: 3 June 1920 Nakful, Bangaon subdivision, North 24 Paraganas, India
- Died: 21 March 2003 (aged 82) Kolkata, West Bengal, India
- Occupation: Historian, Professor, Researcher, President of Paschimbanga Bangla Akademi
- Language: Bengali
- Education: Howrah Zilla School; Surendranath College; Calcutta University
- Genre: Research, History
- Notable works: Bangla sahityer itibritta, Unabingsha shatabdir Prathamardha aar Bangla sahitya, Bangla Sahitye Bidyasagar, Sahitya Jigyasay Rabindranath.

Asit Kumar Bandyopadhyay (3 June 1920 – 21 March 2003) was a historian of Bengali literature, professor, researcher and former president of Paschimbanga Bangla Akademi. He got famous due to his book Bangla Sahityer Itibritta which is published in nine volumes.

== Life ==
Asitkumar Banerjee was born in Nakphule Matulalay in present North 24 Parganas District Bangaon subdivision. His father was Akshay Kumar Banerjee, mother was Charubala Devi. From 1925, they lived in Howrah.

In 1938, he passed matric from Howrah Zilla School in Bengal with 77% marks, becoming the first in the district in this subject. He then stood first in the IA examination from Ripon College(now Surendranath College) among candidates from Bengal and Assam.Then from Calcutta University in BA and MA examination (in 1945) in Bengali Literature, he stood first in the first class and won the gold medal. During his college life, he translated the speeches given by Netaji Subhas Chandra Bose from 1942 into Bengali and printed them in Forward newspaper. As a student, his stories were published in Desh and Navashakti of Advaita Mallavarman.

After passing his MA in 1945, he started teaching at Nabadwip Vidyasagar College that same year. Later he joined Ripon College and the Bengali Department of Calcutta University in 1957. In 2002, after the death of Annandashankar Roy, he took the post of president of Paschimbanga Bangla Akademi and remained in that position for life.

== Notable works ==
- Bangla sahityer itibritta: This is Asitkumar Banerjee's best work. It is a detailed history of Bengali literature published in nine volumes. He also authored a summarised version of the book.
- Smriti Bismriti Darpan (Autobiography)

Other books written by him are written on the Bengali Renaissance. Notable among these are:

- Unabingsha shatabdir Prathamardha aar Bangla sahitya
- Bangla Sahitye Bidyasagar
- Sahitya Jigyasay Rabindranath

He also authored some books of Sahitya Parishat Patrika.

== Honours ==
Apart from being president of Paschimbanga Bangla Akademi, he was the Research Fellow of the Asiatic Society under Bankim Chandra Chattopadhyay of Bengali language and literature. He has also gone abroad for several conferences and guest lectures. In 1981 he attended the International Buddha Mahabhava Conference at Oxford University and in 1996 he was a visiting professor at the University of Arizona. Asitkumar has received several awards and honors as a thinker and researcher. His wife Vinita Gangopadhyay (29 April 1925 – 15 April 2006), professor of history at Howrah Girls' College, wrote historical novels and travelogues under the pseudonym Sukanya.
