= Chinmoy Guha =

Indian essayist, translator, and French scholar

Sir Chinmoy Guha
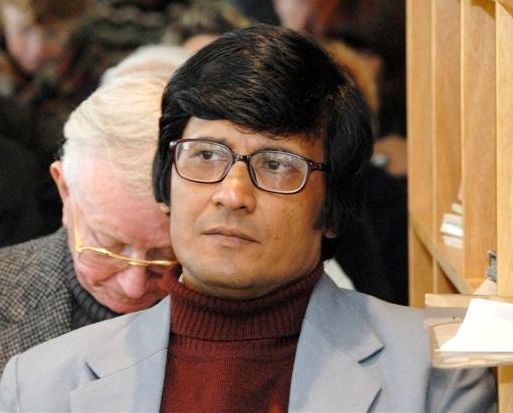
- Chinmoy Guha in September 2013
- Born: 10 September 1958 (age 68); Kolkata, West Bengal, India
- Occupations: Professor Emeritus of English, essayist, translator, literary critic
- Spouse: Anasuya Guha (Former Professor of English at Bethune College)
- Children: Surangama Guha
- Writing career
- Notable works: Ghumer Darja Thele, Where the Dreams Cross: T.S. Eliot and French Poetry, Bridging East and West: Rabindranath Tagore and Romain Rolland Correspondence 1919-1940
- Notable awards: Chevalier des Palmes Académiques; Chevalier des Arts et des Lettres; Chevalier de l'Ordre national du Mérite; Sahitya Akademi Award; Vidyasagar Puroshkar
- Website: www.chinmoyguha.blogspot.com

Sir Chinmoy Guha (born September 1958 in Kolkata, India) is an Indian essayist, translator, and a scholar of French language and literature, currently serving as Professor Emeritus at the University of Calcutta. He has served as the Vice-Chancellor of Rabindra Bharati University and Director of Publications, Embassy of France, New Delhi. Earlier he taught English at Vijaygarh Jyotish Ray College in Kolkata for more than two decades, and French at the Alliance Française and the Ramakrishna Mission Institute of Culture for eleven and five years respectively.

He has been awarded the Lila Ray Memorial Honour for Translation by the Paschimbanga Bangla Akademi in 2008 and the Derozio Bicentenary Award in 2010. He has been knighted by the ministries of Education and Culture of the Government of France in 2010 and 2013 respectively. Paschimbanga Bangla Akademi and the Government of West Bengal conferred on him the Vidyasagar Smriti Puraskar in 2016. The President of France conferred on him in November 2019 the title of Chevalier de l'Ordre national du Mérite for his contribution to intercultural exchange. He won the Sahitya Akademi Award 2019 in Bengali for his collection of essays Ghumer Darja Thele.

== Education ==
Guha graduated in English literature from St. Xavier's College, Calcutta and followed up with an M.A. from the University of Calcutta. He completed his PhD on T. S. Eliot from Jadavpur University where he was a Teacher Fellow for one year.

He has researched in France, Britain and Switzerland. He has lectured on Romain Rolland and India and other subjects at the India Festival in Boulogne-Billancourt (2002), at University of Avignon (2004), Ecole Normale Supérieure of Lyon (2005), Institut national des langues et civilisations orientales (2009), Cité internationale universitaire de Paris (2009), Edinburgh Napier University (2012), the Mahatma Gandhi Institute, Mauritius (2012), Université de Paris-Sorbonne (2015), Académie des Belles Lettres et des Sciences, La Rochelle, France (2017) and the Institute of European Studies, Belgrade, Serbia (2017). He has been a visiting professor at the Fondation Maison des sciences de l'homme, Paris (2009 and 2013).

== Academic career ==
Guha is currently Professor Emeritus at the Department of English, University of Calcutta. He was also Professor and former Head of the Department, former Convenor of the PhD Programme in English and former Chairperson of the Undergraduate Board of English Studies at the University. He has also lectured at multiple foreign universities including universities of Paris-Sorbonne, University of Paris 7 Denis Diderot, Edinburgh Napier University, Scotland; St John's College, Oxford; Manchester University, Warwick University, Worcester University College, University of Avignon, France; Institut des Langues Orientales, Paris et al.

Guha was the Vice-Chancellor of Rabindra Bharati University and is a former director of Bureau du Livre, Embassy of France in New Delhi.

== Literary activities ==
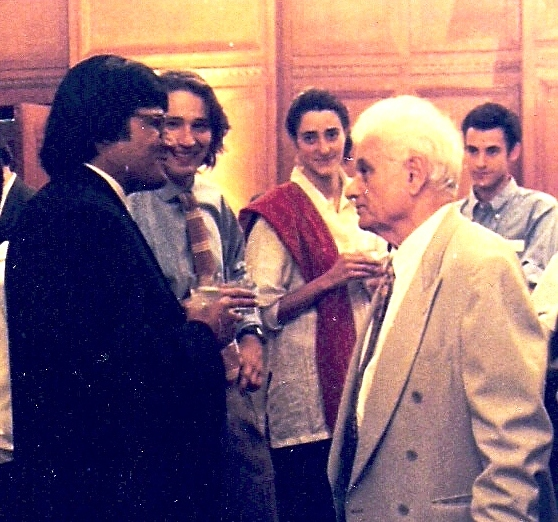
Chinmoy Guha with Jacques Derrida

His translation of Molière's George Dandin, staged by Alliance Française de Chittagong, Bangladesh won an award in 2009.

A review in the Times Higher Education praised his enthusiasm for Eliot's poetry and his book Where the Dreams Cross as 'thoughtful and instructive' which 'casts a fresh light on Eliot's poetry'.

== Awards ==
- Lila Ray Memorial Honour for Translation, Paschimbanga Bangla Akademi, Government of West Bengal, 2008.
- Chevalier des Palmes Académiques, Government of France, 2010.
- Chevalier des Arts et des Lettres, Government of France, 2013.
- Vidyasagar Smriti Puraskar, Paschimbanga Bangla Akademi, 2016.
- Chevalier de l'Ordre national du Mérite, Government of France, 2019.
- Sahitya Akademi Award, Sahitya Akademi, 2019.

== Documentaries ==
He has been the narrator of several documentaries produced by the Bhasha Mandakini project of the Central Institute of Indian Languages. The documentaries pertained to subjects such as Rabindranath Tagore, Arun Mitra, Kaliprasanna Singha, Peary Chand Mitra, Bibhutibhushan Mukhopadhyay and Buddhadeb Bosu.

== Works ==
=== Books ===
- Maxims by la Rochefoucauld (Bengali translation from French), 1990, 1997. Dey's Publishing, 2007.
- The Apu Trilogy by Robin Wood (Bengali translation from English), 1992, Parul Edition, 2012.
- The Tower and the Sea: Correspondence between Romain Rolland and Kalidas Nag 1922–1938 (Edited and French letters translated), Papyrus, 1996; Sahitya Akademi, 2010.'
- Shirno Toron [Strait is the Gate by André Gide] Sahitya Akademi, 1997, 2003, 2011.
- George Dandin by Molière [co-translated with Arup Rudra and edited], Model Publications, 1998.

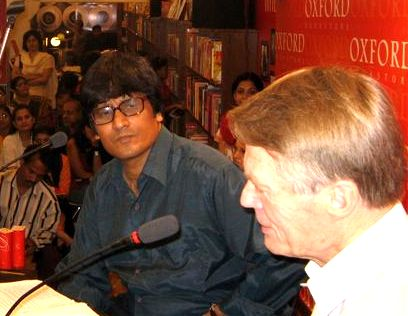
Chinmoy Guha with Le Clézio, the 2008 Nobel laureate in literature

- Conjugation of French Verbs, Robert et Nathan, Tr. into English, W R Goyal, New Delhi, 2000.
- Where the Dreams Cross: T S Eliot and French Poetry, Papyrus, 2000; Macmillan 2011; Primus Books 2020.
- Ahammaker Abhidhan [The Dictionary of Idiots] by Gustave Flaubert, Proma, 2001, Gangchil, 2007, 2009.
- Danton: The Theatre of French Revolution by Romain Rolland, Anustup, 2002.
- Victor Hugo: A Biography, Papyrus, 2003.
- Kendra o Anupastithir Majkhane: An Anthology of French Poetry, Prativas, 2004.
- Chilekothar Unmadini o Anyanya Prabandha, Ananda Publishers, 2007.
- Remembering Sartre, co-edited with Sudeshna Chakravarti, Dasgupta and Co., 2007.
- Time, Space, Text: Mapping Cultural Paradigms, co-edited with Tirtha Prasad Mukhopadhyay, University of Calcutta and UGC-Academic Staff College, 2008.
- Anya Jalbatash Anya Dheu: An Anthology of Twentieth Century French Poetry, Deys Publishing, 2010.
- Garho Sankher Khonje: A Collection of Essays, Ananda Publishers, January 2011.
- Aaina Bhangte Bhangte, Conversations with Rabindra Kumar Dasgupta, Mrinal Sen, Badal Sircar, Father Detienne, P. Lal, Tapan Raychaudhuri, Sankha Ghosh, Dipendu Chakraborty, Gayatri Chakravorty Spivak. Gangchil, 2011.
- Breaking the Silence: Virginia Woolf, Ashapurna Devi and Simone de Beauvoir, co-edited with Sanjukta Dasgupta, Dasgupta and co, 2011.
- On the Seashore of Humanity: The Sesquicentenary Volume on Tagore, co-edited with Professor Biswanath Roy, Chief Editor: Professor Suranjan Das, University of Calcutta, 2012.
- Anubad Sangraha, vol 1, Arun Mitra, Ed. Chinmoy Guha, Gangchil, 2012.
- Prabandha Sangraha, vol 1, Arun Mitra, Ed. Chinmoy Guha, Gangchil, 2013.
- Tagore-At Home in the World, co-edited with Sanjukta Dasgupta, Sage Publications, 2013.
- Brishti ar Roddurer Kabita, Jacques Prevert, co-edited with Palash Bhadra, Parul Publications, 2014.
- Prabandha Sangraha, vol 2, Arun Mitra, Ed. Chinmoy Guha, Gangchil, 2014.
- Amar Chaplin [My Chaplin], Mrinal Sen, Trans. Chinmoy Guha, Ananda Publishers, 2015.
- Ghumer Darja Thele, Signet Press-Ananda Publishers, 2016.
- Surer Bandhane, Parampara, 2016.
- Connecting Texts: Literature, Theatre and Cinema, Co-edited with Sinjini Bandyopadhyay, Dasgupta and co, 2016.
- Stage and Screen: Representations and Self-Discoveries, Co-edited with Sinjini Bandyopadhyay, Dasgupta and co, 2017.
- Bridging East and West: Rabindranath Tagore and Romain Rolland Correspondence 1919-1940, Edited, introduced, annotated and French Letters Translated, Oxford University Press, 2018.
- He Ananta Nakkhatrabithi, Signet Press-Ananda Publishers, 2018.
- Bindu Theke Bindute, Parampara Prakashan, 2022.
- Ek Akash Haiku, Parampara Prakashan, 2024.
- Andha Aaina, Parampara Prakashan, 2024.
- Broken Mirror: Conversations with Artists and Thinkers, translated by Zenith Roy, Primus Books, 2024.

=== Articles in books ===
- Voices from Bengal, An Anthology of Modern Poetry, (Ed. Sukanta Chaudhuri), Sahitya Akademi Kolkata, 1997.
- Whatever I Write and have Written is You, An Anthology of Poems by Samarendra Sengupta, Cambridge Books, Kolkata, 1998.
- "Man with the Lamp", Be Vocal in Times of Beauty, Ed. C. Venugopal, Writers Workshop, Kolkata, 2000.
- André Gide's Introduction to his French Translation of Tagore's Gitanjali, Gitanjali, Bilingual Edition, Visva-Bharati and UBS, 2003.
- "Out of Place: the Translator's Identity" in Poetry: Text and Context, UGC Academic Staff College and Department of English, University of Calcutta, 2004.
- "The Return of the Dead: Laforgue and Eliot", in Phases of Twentieth Century Literature in English (Foreword. by Amiya Dev), Thakurpukur Vivekananda College, Kolkata, 2004.
- Lessons on Lessons, Writers Workshop, Kolkata, 2005.

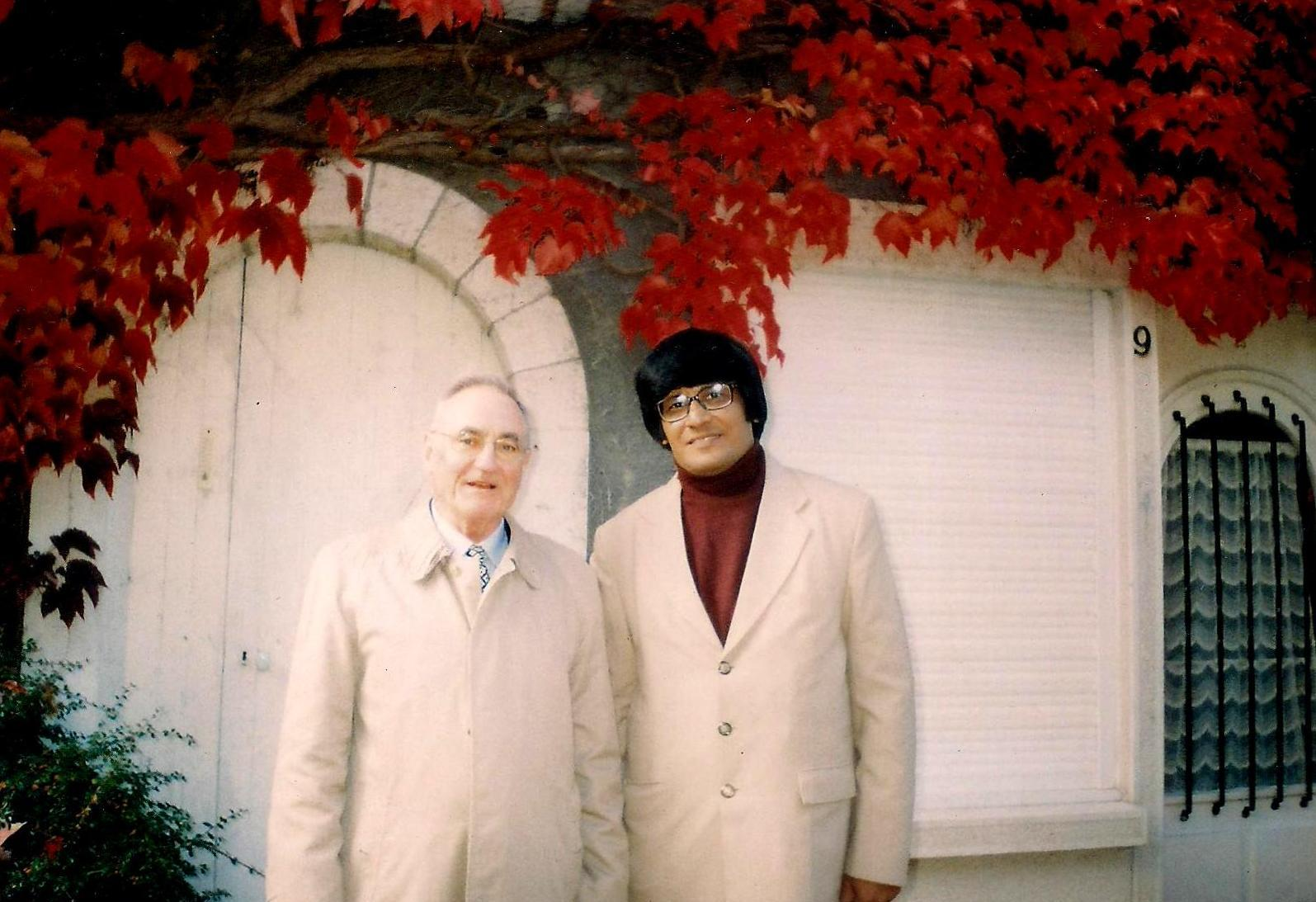
Chinmoy Guha with Romain Rolland's biographer Bernard Duchatelet

- "Eliot-er Purbapurush", T S Eliot: Bangali Mon o Monone, Ed Tapas Basu, Pustak Bipani, Kolkata, 1991.
- "The Golden Harp: Tagore and St-John Perse", Tagore and Modernity, University of Calcutta, Dasgupta & Co., Kolkata, 2006.
- "Sunya Ainar Madhye", Anudito o Aunusari Bangla Sahitya, University of Calcutta, Kolkata, 2006.
- "Alokeranjan Dasgupta" in Kritisches Lexikon der fremdsprachigen Gegenwartsliteratur: Indische Literatur der Gegenwart, Edition text+ kritik in Richard Boorberg Verlag GmbH & Co KG, Germany
- Lines in Anger: Protest in Literature and literature of Protest, Sponsored by University Grants Commission, Gurudas College, 2006.
- "Thy Infinite Gifts, Article on Tagore and St John Perse", Gitanjali, Parul Prakashani, Kolkata, September 2007.
- Sampratik Biswasahitya: Manabik Mukh, Paschim Banga Ganatantrik Shilpi Sangha, Kolkata, 2007.
- Article in French: "En quête d'un nouvel espace: Romain Rolland et l'Inde" in L'Usage de L'Inde dans les littératures francaises et contemporaines (XIIIe –XXe siecles) la Société Internationale des Littératures de l'Ere Coloniale, Paris: Edition Kailash, 2008.
- "Questioning the Frontiers: Rabindranath and Romain Rolland", Narrating the (Trans)Nation, University of Calcutta, Das Gupta and Co., Kolkata, 2008.
- "Quest for an Alternative Discourse", 50 Years of Independence, Ed. Ananda Dasgupta, Gangchil, 2008.
- Thots n Jots, UGC Academic Staff College, Calcutta University, 2009
- Introduction, Duti Natak, Albert Camus, Tr. Palash Bhadra, Radiance, Kolkata, 2010.
- "La Guirlande des beaux Accords", Romain Rolland: Une Oeuvre de Paix, Publications de la Sorbonne, Paris, June 2010.
- "On Buddhadev's Translation of Baudelaire", Buddhadev Bose: Boichitrer Nana Matra, Ratnabali, 2010.
- "Rabindranath o Romain Rolland: Muchhe Jaoa Sanglap", Rabindranath: Vakpati Viswamana, Adviser: Sankha Ghosh, Ed.Sudhir Chakrabarty, Calcutta University and Institute of Development Studies, Kolkata, May 2011.
- "Rabindranath o Romain Rolland", Rabindranath Thakur o Ekush Shataker Bangali, Burdwan University, Ed. Sumita Chakrabarty, May 2011.
- "Romain Rolland and Annada Sankar Ray", Desh, Kal, Patra: Commemorative volume on Annada Sankar Ray, Sahitya Akademi, 2011.
- "Tagore and Anna de Noailles", Avipshito Rabindranath, Ed. Rajatsuvro Mukhopadhyay, Deep Prakashani, 2012.
- "Kamalakanta: Ek Bishphorak Aina", Bankim 175, Advisor: Tapan Raychaudhuri, Ed. Satyajit Chaudhuri, Sahitya Akademi, 2014.
- "Rabindranath Tagore and Romain Rolland: Crossing the Frontiers", in Tagore's Vision of the Contemporary World, Indian Council of Cultural Relations, and Har Anand, New Delhi, 2016.
- "Esquisse d'une Grande Oeuvre: Romain Rolland et Tagore", in Romain Rolland et l'Inde: Un échange fructueux, Editions universitaires de Dijon, France, 2016.
- "Bankimchandra: Natun ek Siharon", in Bangla Academy Patrika: Nirbachito Nibandha, Ed. Saoli Mitra, Paschimbanga Bangla Academy, 2017.
- "Kobitar Anubad-Samasya O Banglay Biswakobitar Anubad Prosango", Bichitra Prabandho, Ed. Samaresh Debnath, Dhaka: Chitrakatha Prakashani, 2021
- "Puroskar Baro, Na Purushkar?", Sampratik Samalochana Sahitya, Ed. Samaresh Debnath, Dhaka: Kakoli Prakashani, 2023
