= Sanglap =

Bangla Sanglap may refer to–

- Dialogue means Bangla Sanglap in some Indian languages (Hindi, Bengali etc.)
- Sanglap Group Theater a Bengali theater group in Bangladesh since 18 June 1978.
- Sanglap Kolkata a Bengali theatre group
- Sanglap Bhowmik– a Bengali film editor
