= Saint Monica's Players =

Amateur theatre company in the United Kingdom, formed in 1958

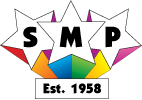
- Type: Theatre group
- Purpose: Musicals, Plays & Pantomimes
- Location: Enfield, London
- Chairman: Ellie Ashby
- Past Chairmen: Luke Clow, Phil O'Flaherty, Ben Hewis, Stuart Wall, Warren McWilliams, Mike Benyon
- Website: www.smptheatre.co.uk

Saint Monica's Players (SMP) is an amateur dramatic society based in Enfield.

It was formed in 1958 out of the Saint Monica's church of Palmers Green. The group has performed over 200 different plays and musicals at local theatres and drama festivals and competitions. They produce three shows per year; a summer show at the Millfield Theatre in June, a pantomime at the Intimate Theatre in January and a night of one act plays.
