= Sanglap Kolkata =

Kolkata based Bengali theatre group

- Sanglap Kolkata group logo
- Formation: 1979
- Type: Theatre group
- Location: Kolkata, West Bengal, India
- Artistic director: Dr. Kuntal Mukhopadhyay

Sanglap Kolkata or Sanglap theatre group is a Kolkata based Bengali theatre group. The theatre group was founded in 1979. The group's first production was "Ispat" based on Nikolai Ostrovsky's novel "How the Steel Was Tempered".

== Productions ==
Full-length plays

- Chop Adalat Cholche
- Dhonra Kartick
- Iswarer Khonje
- Amol Syndrome(2014)
- Ratnakar
- Lathi Kando (2008, based on a novel of Shirshendu Mukhopadhyay)
- Aborton (2007)
- Astarag (2006)
- Ferari Fouz (2005)
- Bhavam Chaleche Juddehy (2004)
- Hai raam (2002)
- Kaalchakra (2000)
- Sudrayana (1998)
- Ghare Phera (1994, based on Home Coming by Harold Pinter)
- Disha (1993, based on Volga Theke Ganga by Rahul Sankrityayan)
- Ispat

One act plays

- Augasta Yatra
- Panchanarir Agnibina
- Shikhandi
- Shyamababur Diary
- A-mrita-katha
- Oedipus Rex
- Bidhi-O-Betikram (based on Bertolt Brecht).
- Tarasher Bhar
- Rather Rashi (written by Rabindranath Tagore).
- Jagaran
- Aayna
- Prastab
- Padma-Ghokro

== Awards ==
- 1993: Disha won "Best production of the year" award from Drama Academy of India.
- 1994: Ghare Phera "Best actress" award from Drama Academy of India.
- 1998: Sudrayan "Best script and best choreography" award from Paschim Banga Natya Akademi

== Sanglap Natyotsab ==
Since 1993, the Sanglap theatre group is organizing theatre festival every year during January–February which is known as Sanglap Natyotsab. Eminent theatre groups from Kolkata, West Bengal, Bangladesh etc. participate in this theatre festival.
