= St Anne's Catholic High School =

St Anne's Catholic High School for Girls

Location
- Oakthorpe Road; Palmers Green, London, N13 5TY; England; 51°36′59″N 0°06′29″W

Information
- Type: Voluntary aided school
- Motto: "Act Justly, Love Tenderly, Walk Humbly with your God" (Micah 6:8)
- Religious affiliation: Roman Catholic
- Established: 1994
- Local authority: Enfield
- Department for Education URN: 102053 Tables
- Ofsted: Reports
- Chair of Governors: Beverley Bevan
- Headmistress: Emma Loveland
- Gender: Girls
- Age: 11 to 18
- Enrolment: c. 910
- Houses: St. Joan of Arc, St. Kateri Tekakwitha, St. Elizabeth Seton, Sister Thea Bowman, St. Catherine of Alexandria, St. Theresa of Calcutta
- Colours: Burgundy and Navy
- Website: http://www.st-annes.enfield.sch.uk/

St Anne's Catholic High School for Girls is an all-girls Catholic secondary school located in London, England, which was founded to provide education for Catholic girls aged 11–18. It is situated in Palmers Green and is the highest performing non-selective school in the London Borough of Enfield.

== Description ==
St Anne's Catholic High School opened on 1 September 1994, following the amalgamation of Holy Family Convent School and St Angela's School for Girls.

As a "Catholic" school, the religious education (RE) curriculum and opportunities for spiritual development is in accordance with the doctrines, rites and practices of the Roman Catholic Church. All students study RE from years 7 to 13 and must take it as a GCSE.

The governing body admits 180 pupils to Year 7 every school year and follows the pastoral system. Within each year group there are six tutor groups, each with a Form Tutor, and six houses with their own House Mistresses.

The girls follow the National Curriculum for the first three years: Mathematics, English, Science, Technology and Information Technology, Religious Studies, French, Geography, History, Art, Music, Physical Education and Drama.

In Years 10, 11 and the Sixth Form, students have more choice about the subjects they study, through the introduction of Option Subjects. Students have to follow a common curriculum: Religious Education, English Language and Literature, Mathematics, Double Science or Triple Science for the very able students and Physical Education (Short course).

In addition, students choose three Option Subjects from the following list: Art & Design, Graphic Products, Food Technology, Textiles, Spanish, French, Geography, History, Computer Science, Drama and Musical Studies.

== The Sixth Form ==
St Anne's has a Sixth Form for students entering Lower Sixth and wanting to continue their education in a Christian environment. Students of other faiths are also accepted, but whenever there were more applicants than places available, priority is given to Roman Catholic applicants in accordance with the admissions criteria.

== Entrance ==
Admission into the school at 11, 13 and 16 is according to the School Admission Policy.

== Culture ==
Being Catholic, the school has a strong religious Ethos that runs through it. However, the school does admit students of a non-Christian religion.

== Extra-Curricular ==
The school prides itself in its award-winning gospel choir composed of students from all year groups. They have entered numerous competitions and performed many times during events for the school and also for the public; in 2018 they reached the semi-final of the BBC's Songs of Praise.

== Location ==
The school is located on two sites – Lower and Upper. Students in 1st, 2nd and 3rd year are based on the Lower site in Enfield Town, while 4th, 5th and Sixth Form students are based on the Upper site in Palmers Green, near the old Southgate Town Hall. The upper and lower schools are approximately three and a half miles apart, but both lie within the London Borough of Enfield.

== Alumni ==
- Desirèe Henry (b. 1995) - athlete
