= Patrick Carter, Baron Carter of Coles =

British Labour politician and life peer

The Right Honourable The Lord Carter of Coles
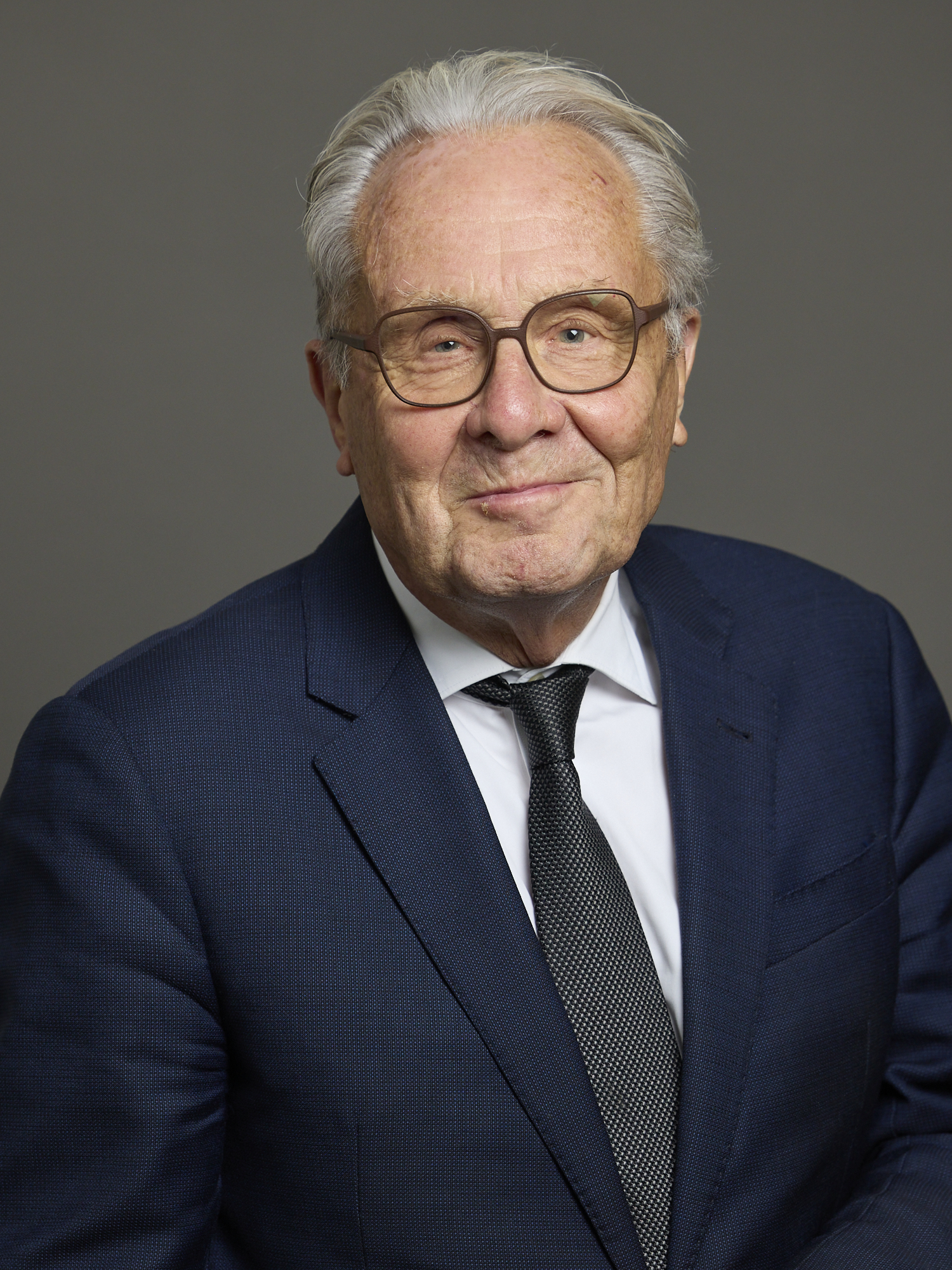
- Official portrait, 2025

Member of the House of Lords
- Lord Temporal
- Life peerage 8 June 2004

Personal details
- Born: 9 February 1946 (age 80)
- Party: Labour
- Education: Brentwood School, Essex

Patrick Robert Carter, Baron Carter of Coles (born 9 February 1946) is a Labour life peer in the House of Lords.

== Early life and career ==
Carter was educated at Brentwood School, Essex, where he was a contemporary of Jack Straw. In his autobiography, Straw described Carter as his closest friend.

Carter then studied economics at Durham University and joined an investment bank as a trainee after he graduated.

In 1985, Carter founded Westminster Health Care, which provided radiology services as well as care to the elderly and those with special needs. He sold the healthcare provider in 1999.

Carter has served on the boards of several US and UK healthcare, insurance and information technology companies. He was president of McKesson Corporation's International Operations Group and was responsible for the company's product portfolio.

He is currently the chair of Primary Insurance Group and Health Services Laboratories.

== Public service ==
Carter has advised the UK government on a wide range of issues. He helped resolve funding problems that surrounded Manchester's hosting of the 2002 Commonwealth Games. He was also the lead facilitator in the resolution of a major financial dispute between Multiplex Construction UK Ltd and Wembley National Stadium Ltd, when the stadium was redeveloped prior to its re-opening in 2007.

Carter also led government reviews into the Criminal Records Bureau, offender management, the procurement of legal aid, national athletics, public diplomacy, and pathology services. In his 2015 review of NHS spending, Carter argued that the NHS in England could save £5 billion a year through better staff organisation and an improved approach to purchasing.

Carter was Chair of Sport England from 2002 to 2006; a board member of the London 2012 Olympic bid; a member of HM Treasury's Productivity Panel; and a non-executive member of the Home Office and Prisons Boards. He also chairs the procurement and efficiency board at the Department of Health and Social Care.

Carter was ranked by the Health Service Journal as the ninth most influential person in NHS England in 2015.

In 2021, Carter was the only Labour member of the House of Lords to vote against an amendment to the Leasehold Reform (Ground Rent) Act 2022 that would have reduced existing long lease ground rents to a peppercorn, or zero financial value. In 2025, The Telegraph reported that Carter was a freeholder, through The Freehold Corporation of which he was a director, of a 122-flat development in Ilford, east London with ground rent charges that increased every five years by the retail price index, negatively affecting the mortgageability and saleability of leaseholders' homes.

== Personal life ==
Carter is an active farmer in Hertfordshire and has a villa in France.

== Honours ==
Carter was made a life peer as Baron Carter of Coles, of Westmill in the County of Hertfordshire on the advice of Prime Minister Tony Blair on 8 June 2004. He takes the Labour whip.

Orders of precedence in the United Kingdom
Preceded by The Lord Howard of Rising	Gentlemen; Baron Carter of Coles	Followed by The Lord Truscott
