= The Fox, Palmers Green =

Public house in London, England

The Fox (Palmers Green pub)
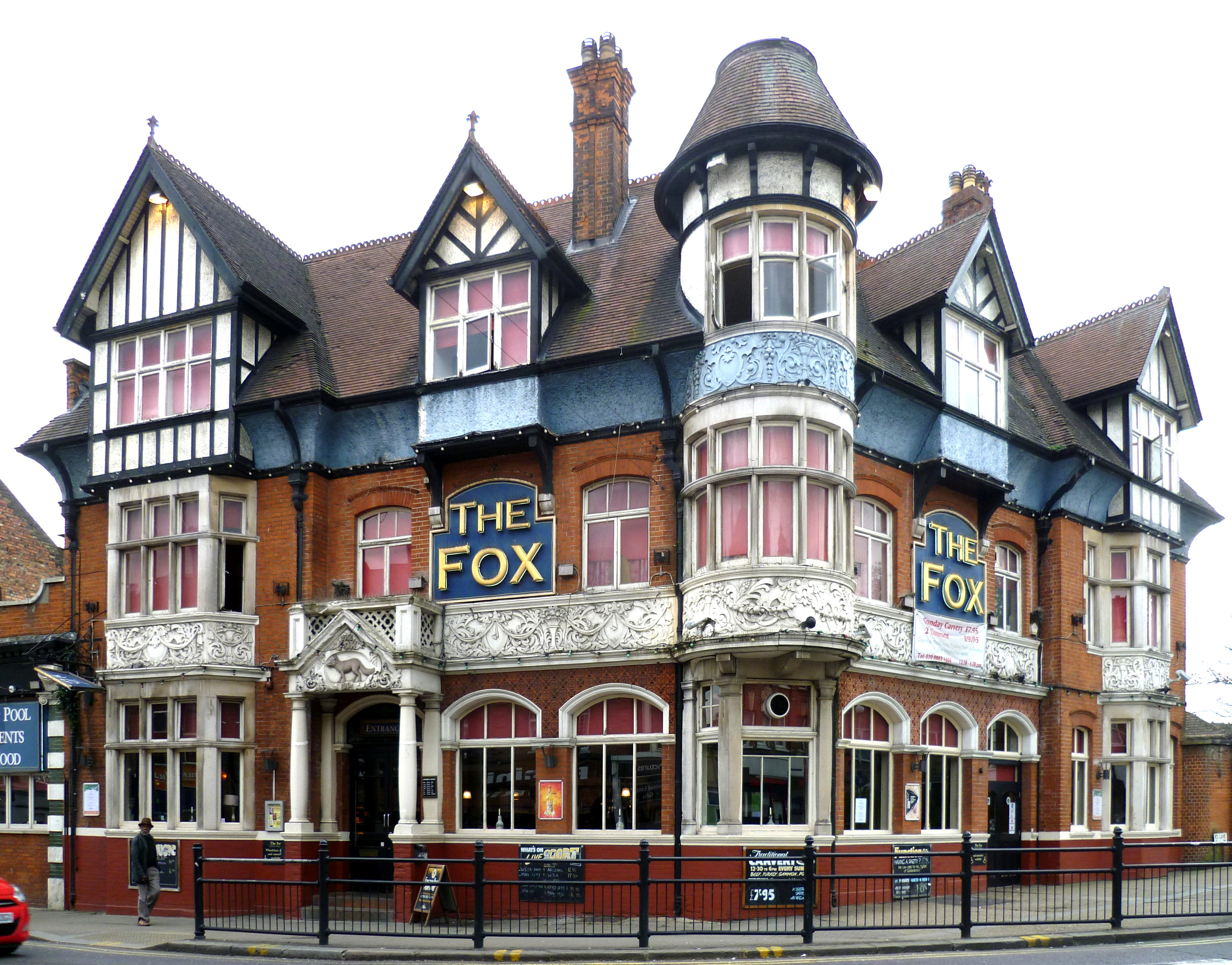
- The Fox

- Location within London Borough of Enfield Location within Greater London

General information
- Location: Green Lanes and Fox Lane, London, England
- Coordinates: 51.620458°N 0.1064957°W

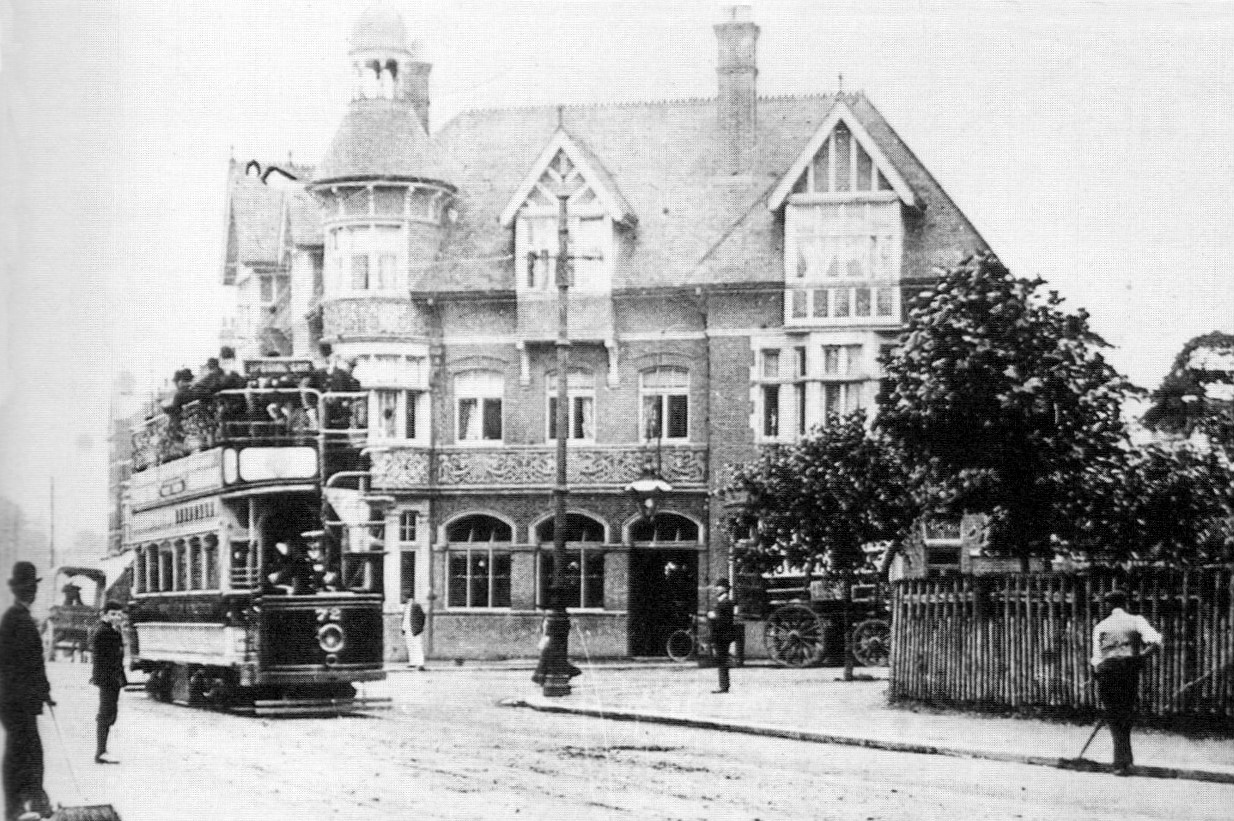
The Fox with tram, 1907.

The Fox is a public house in Palmers Green, north London, on the corner of Green Lanes and Fox Lane. A pub and hotel of the name has stood on the site for over 300 years, and the current building dates from 1904.

== History ==
The first mention of The Fox is in 1682. The Society of Tradesmen and Labourers (1794-1825) met there.

Before the advent of the motor car, the Fox was the terminus of the horse-drawn bus service into London, run by the Davey family of publicans. The building formerly had stables at the back. The present building was constructed in 1904.

In 2002, a dispute between rival Albanian drugs gangs at The Fox spilled out on to the streets of Palmers Green and two men were critically injured and a third man, Edmund Gullhaj (22), was pronounced dead at the scene.

The Fox featured in the film of J. K. Rowling's novel Harry Potter and the Prisoner of Azkaban (2004).

In 2015, the pub became the London Borough of Enfield's first Asset of Community Value after a successful application by Southgate Civic District Trust. The Wonder public house in Enfield Town is similarly recognised. In 2017, it was reported that Dutch brewers Heineken owned the pub and were preparing plans to redevelop it.

== See also ==
- List of pubs in London
