= Alfred Cecil Herring =

English recipient of the Victoria Cross

Alfred Cecil Herring VC
- Born: 26 October 1888; Tottenham, London
- Died: 10 August 1966 (aged 77); Weybridge, Surrey
- Burial place: Woking Crematorium
- Military career
- Allegiance: United Kingdom
- Branch: British Army
- Rank: Major
- Units: Royal Army Service Corps; The Northamptonshire Regiment (attached)
- Conflicts: World War I
- Awards: Victoria Cross

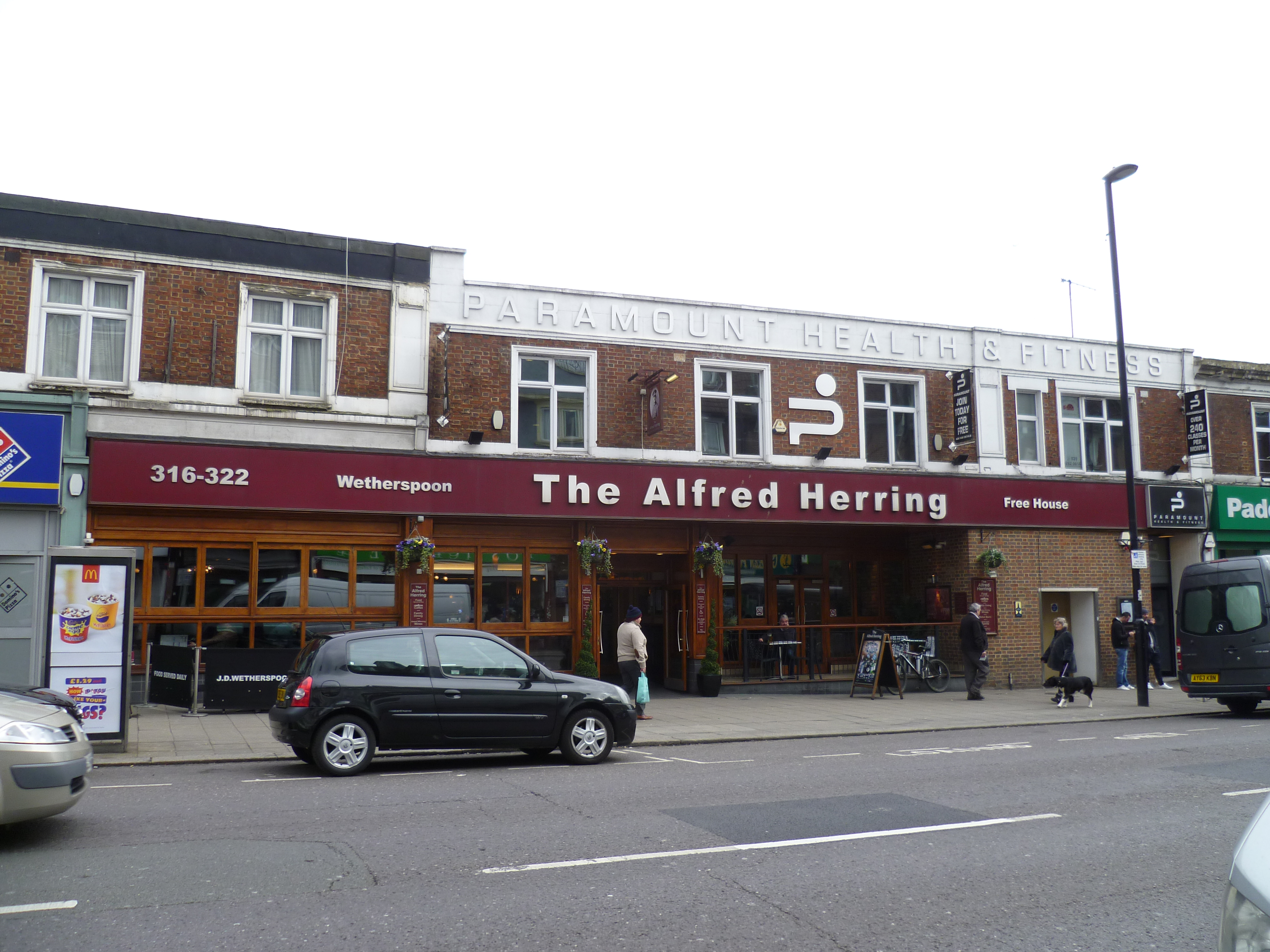
The Alfred Herring pub, Palmers Green.

Major Alfred Cecil Herring VC (26 October 1888 – 10 August 1966) was an English recipient of the Victoria Cross, the highest and most prestigious award for gallantry in the face of the enemy that can be awarded to British and Commonwealth forces.

== Early life ==
Alfred Cecil Herring was educated at Tottenham County School where he was captain of the school at cricket and football.

== Details ==
He was 29 years old, and a temporary second lieutenant in the Royal Army Service Corps, British Army, attached to 6th (S) Battalion, The Northamptonshire Regiment during the First World War when the following deed took place for which he was awarded the VC.

On 23/24 March 1918 at Montagne Bridge, France, the enemy had gained a position on the south bank of the canal and Second Lieutenant Herring's post was surrounded, but he immediately counter-attacked and recaptured the position, together with 20 prisoners and six machine-guns. During the night the post was continually attacked, but all attacks were beaten off, largely because Lieutenant Herring was frequently visiting his men and cheering them up. It was owing to his bravery and magnificent handling of his troops that the enemy advance was held up for 11 hours at a very critical period.

== Further information ==
He was born in Tottenham, north London. He later achieved the rank of major. He was a Chartered Accountant by profession

In 2006, a new pub on Green Lanes, Palmers Green, in north London, formerly run by the Wetherspoons chain, was named after him. They sold the pub in May 2024 and it reopened later in the year under independent management.

== The medal ==
His Victoria Cross is displayed at the New Royal Logistic Corps Museum, RHQ The RLC, Building 204, Worthy Down Barracks, Winchester. SO21 2RG. (date 2021) signed KMB

== Bibliography ==
- Buzzell, Nora, ed. (1997). The Register of the Victoria Cross. Cheltenham, Gloucestershire: This England Alma House. ISBN 0-906324-27-0.
- Gliddon, Gerald (2013) [2004]. Spring Offensive 1918. VCs of the First World War. Stroud, Gloucestershire: The History Press. ISBN 978-0-7524-8730-4.
- Harvey, David (2000). Monuments to Courage. Naval & Military Press Ltd. ISBN 1-84342-356-1.
