= Margaret Bromhall =

English radiotherapist (1890–1967)

Margaret Ann Bromhall (7 November 1890 – 5 January 1967) was an English radiotherapist. She was the first radiotherapist appointed to North Middlesex Hospital and was the first radiotherapist to lead a radiotherapy department. She worked at North Middlesex Hospital from 1934 until 1954.

== Life ==
Born in Walsall, Staffordshire, on 7 November 1890, Bromhall trained in medicine at Manchester University, qualifying M.B., Ch.B. in 1924.

She then worked as a radium officer at the North of England Radium Institute in Newcastle upon Tyne. Bromhall had a desire to travel, and she travelled to Perth, Australia, where she worked as a radiotherapist for several years. In 1932, she earned a diploma in medical radiology and electrotherapy (DMRE), and two years later was appointed to head the newly established radiotherapy department at North Middlesex Hospital. She remained there until 1954. This department was one of the first radiotherapy departments in the country, and Bromhall was thus both the first radiotherapist to be appointed at the hospital, and the first radiotherapist in the country to lead a radiotherapy department. At its establishment, the department catered for all Middlesex County hospitals, dealing with “the discards of the medical and surgical wards.”. Bromhall was known for her careful, thorough and methodical approach, coupled with a brisk manner, and was recalled as having “a shrewd appreciation of what she was attempting to do for her patients, and how to achieve this with the least hurt.”

Bromhall died in London on 5 January 1967 aged 76. Papers relating to Margaret Bromhall are held at the University of Manchester Library.
