= St Monica's Church, Palmers Green =

St Monica's Catholic Church
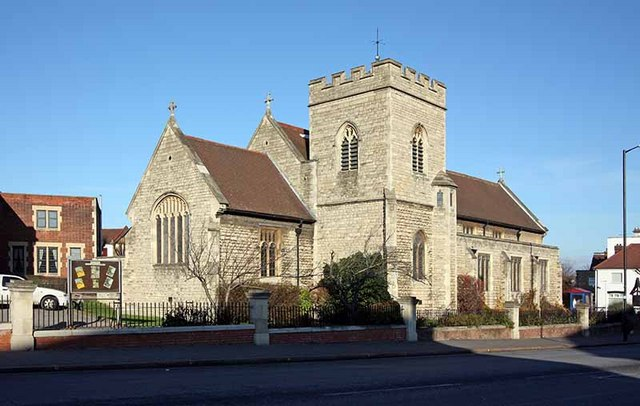

- Location within Greater London
- 51°37′27″N 0°6′9″W
- OS grid reference: TQ 31445 93409
- Location: Stonard Road, London N13 4DJ
- Country: England
- Denomination: Roman Catholic
- Website: www.stmonica.co.uk

History
- Status: Parish church
- Consecrated: 4 May 1914

Architecture
- Functional status: Active
- Years built: 1913–1914

Administration
- Province: Westminster
- Archdiocese: Westminster
- Deanery: Enfield
- Parish: Palmers Green

Clergy
- Priest: Canon Mehall Lowry

St Monica's Catholic Church is a parish of the Roman Catholic Church in the Palmers Green area of north London. The parish church is situated at the junction of Stonard Road and Green Lanes in the London Borough of Enfield.

It is one of only two parishes in the Diocese of Westminster to be dedicated to Saint Monica, the other being that of St Monica's Priory, Hoxton.

Originally founded as a mission church, it then became established as a parish, with a presbytery built alongside in 1931.

As of 2021, the church has two priests, a parish sister and a lay youthworker. The church activities include community programmes and social action alongside worship and pastoral care.

== History ==
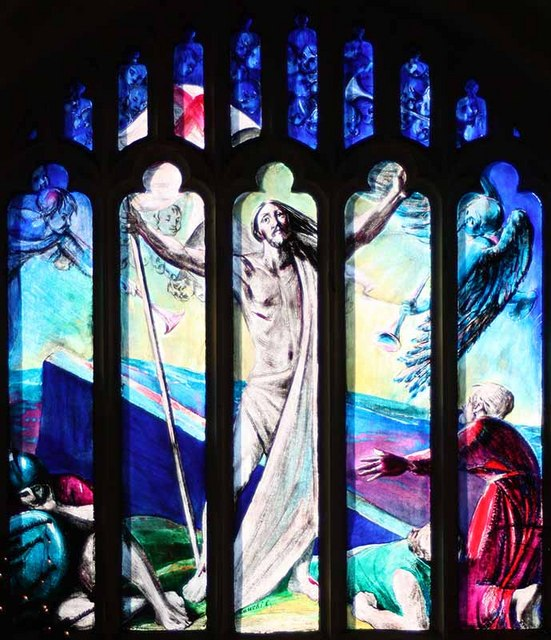
East window

The parish church was founded as a mission church in 1910. Father Thomas Heditch was appointed rector of the new parish in 1910. He fell ill in the spring of 1912 and went on a pilgrimage to Lourdes, from which he did not return. His successor Father Patrick Gallagher was appointed rector on 27 June 1912.

Father Gallagher originally came from the parish of Midfield, County Mayo in Ireland. He was a late recruit to the priesthood, having previously been a builder based in the Northeast of England. After a family tragedy he joined the priesthood, and became the main driving force in the building of St. Monica's Church. Using his considerable resources and connections within the building industry, Father Gallagher managed to build the church within two years of his arrival.

The church's official opening was on Monday 4 May 1914 by Francis Cardinal Bourne in front of nearly 600 lay people and 40 clergy. The church, together with the presbytery, was built for £6,600, including the cost of the site.

In 1954, Father Gallagher built St. Monica's Primary School on land in nearby Cannon Hill in Southgate. He died three years later on 11 December 1957. He is buried with his family in Stanley, County Durham in the northeast of England.

The church started an amateur dramatic society, Saint Monica's Players (SMP), in 1958, which continues to perform musicals across Enfield today.

From 1935 to 1987, the parish hall was used for a repertory theatre, the Intimate Theatre.

== Interior ==
In 1920, Father Gallagher attended the Passion Play at Oberammergau in Bavaria, Germany. He was impressed by the wood carving industry there. He promptly ordered the Sacred Heart altar and a Lady altar (which has since been removed), the statues of St Monica and St Joseph, two confessional boxes and a handsome pulpit with an effective sounding board (also removed).

=== The Sacred Heart Chapel ===
Situated in the traditional south west corner of the church, the Sacred Heart Chapel was an anonymous gift from an early parishioner. The walls are lined with stone mosaic in various patterns and rich colours in the Byzantine style. Two angels bear parts of one of Jesus' revelations to Sister Margret Mary in the 1670s: 'Behold this Heart' on the left and 'Which has so loved men' on the right. The Sacred Heart statue is in the centre of the wooden altar, surrounded by intricate carving. The painted panels on each side of the statue depict on the left, St Peter receiving the keys of the Church from Jesus, while on the right, Jesus showing his Sacred Heart to Sister Margret Mary, in the chapel where she lived and worked. The stained glass window, by Franz Mayer & Co of Munich, portrays Jesus surrounded by children and has the superscription: 'Suffer little children to come unto me' (Mark 10:14). A line below the images invites people to 'Pray for the Donors'.

=== Statues ===
The statue of St Monica, with St Augustine as a baby in a boat at her feet, stands in front of the modern Reconciliation Room. This was built in the Baptistery, which itself was added to the church in 1964. The statue of St Joseph, holding a lily, the symbol of the Christian virtue of chastity, is adjacent to the Sacred Heart Chapel. The Statue of St Mary is in a niche on the north wall and has a popular candle stand and the Book of Remembrance below.

=== The Stations of the Cross ===
Originally framed, the fourteen Stations of the Cross, carved in oak, were commissioned by Father Gallagher. Their provenance is unknown.

=== The organ ===
The organ, used for the first time at Christmas in 1924, was described by The Tablet as 'An instrument of great power and beautiful tone'. There was a service to bless it in early January 1925. Cardinal Francis Bourne was due to attend but was indisposed. St Monica's was the second home for the organ, but it is unknown where it was previously. It was refurbished in spring 2014. It is positioned in the organ loft, which sits above the church porch.

=== The crucifix ===
The large wooden crucifix with an expressive, carved Christ (origin unknown) has been hung in various places around the Church over the years. Currently, it hangs along the south wall, and every year on Remembrance Sunday, the congregation turns to face it for a brief service of Remembrance and two minutes' silence.

=== Sanctuary window ===
The sanctuary window above the altar was originally plain glass. For some years it had a curtain across it and the large wooden cross hung there. In 1984, an anonymous donor provided the new window. It was painted by the Maltese artist Carmel Cauchi (born 1927) who said 'It shows Christ in the glory of His resurrection. Jesus is the light'.

=== Lighting ===
New lights were installed in 2010, in time for the celebration of the centenary of the founding of the parish. Designed by Bruce Kirk of Light Perceptions, they were built in Lancashire. Their design reflects that of the original lights from 1914.

== Parish priests ==
- 1910 - Father Thomas Heditch
- 1912 - Father Patrick Gallagher
- 1957 - Canon Reginald Crook
- 1964 - Father Raymund Geraerts
- 1979 - Father Robin Whitney
- 1994 - Father Brian Creak
- 2004 - Canon Roger Taylor
- 2008 - Canon Shaun Lennard
- 2017 - Canon Mehall Lowry

== Curates ==
- 1916 - Father Wilfred Harrington
- 1918 - Father John Sheeran
- 1921 - Father William Gordon
- 1936 - Father Patrick Murphy
- 1949 - Father Henry Dodd
- 1950 - Father Edward Short
- 1951 - Father Peter Boshell
- 1958 - Father Adrian Peeler
- 1963 - Father Hilary Crewe
- 1967 - Father Keith Abram
- 1972 - Father Samuel Steer
- 1979 - Father Frans Azzopardi
- 1986 - Father Patrick Miscampbell OSB
- 1990 - Father Stephen Weaver
- 1995 - Father Dennis Touw
- 2002 - Father Joe Mazarello
- 2004 - Father Shaun Church
- 2007 - Father Philip Dyer-Perry
- 2011 - Father Andrew Gallagher
- 2014 - Father Paulo Bagini
- 2017 - Father John Warnarby
- 2019 - Father Stewart Hasker
- 2022 - Father Paul Zhao SVD
- 2023 - Father David Knight
- 2025 - Father Sean Power
