= Truro House =

Coordinates: 51.6155°N 0.1091°W

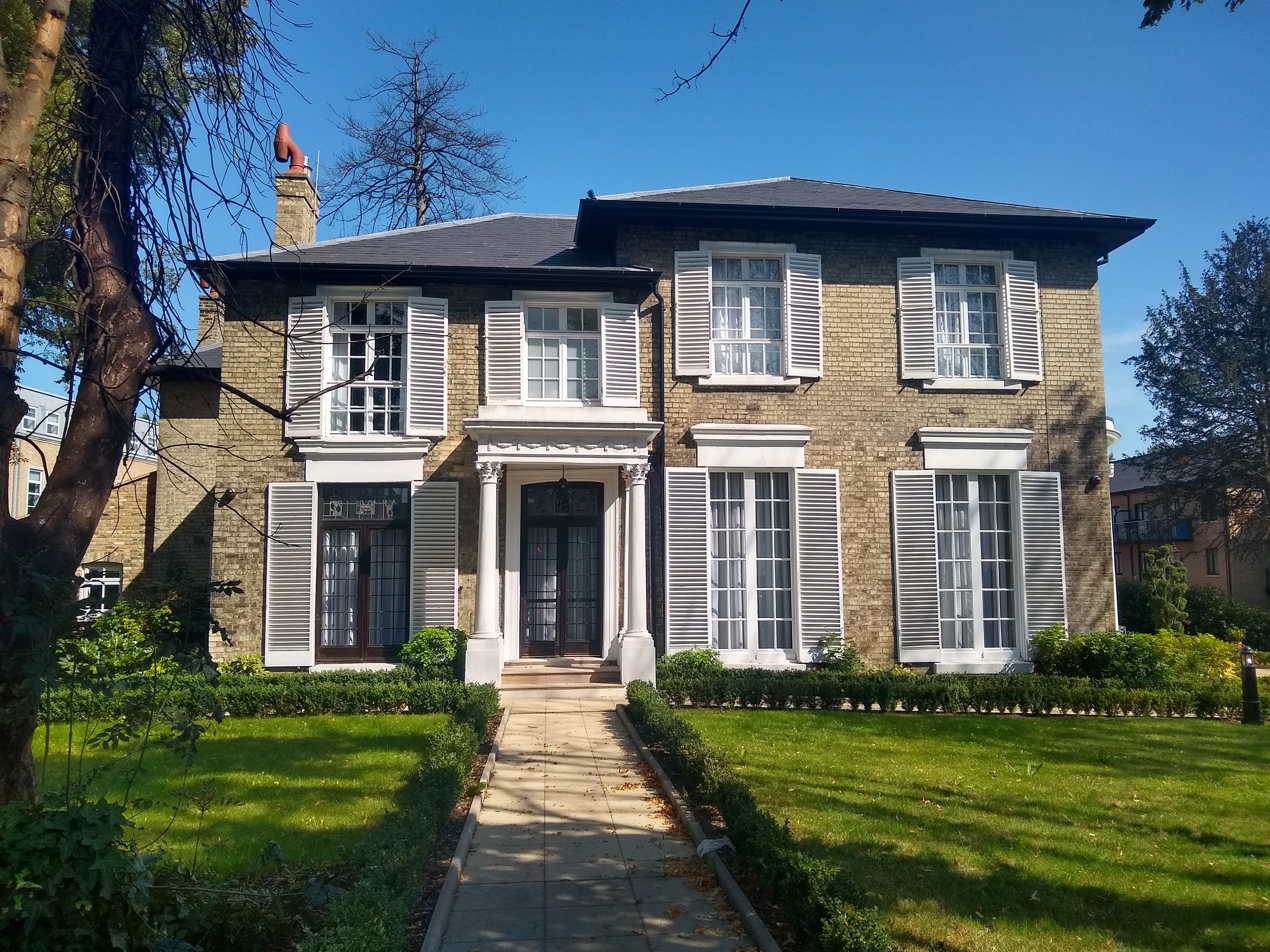
Truro House

Truro House is a grade II listed house on the corner of Green Lanes and Oakthorpe Road in Palmers Green, London. It is named for former owner Thomas Wilde, 1st Baron Truro. Immediately to the south is the New River. The building was finally refurbished and repaired for sale in 2017 as part of an adjoining housing development.
