= Palmers Green United Reformed Church =

United reformed church in Fox Lane, Palmers Green, London

Coordinates: 51.6226°N 0.1103°W

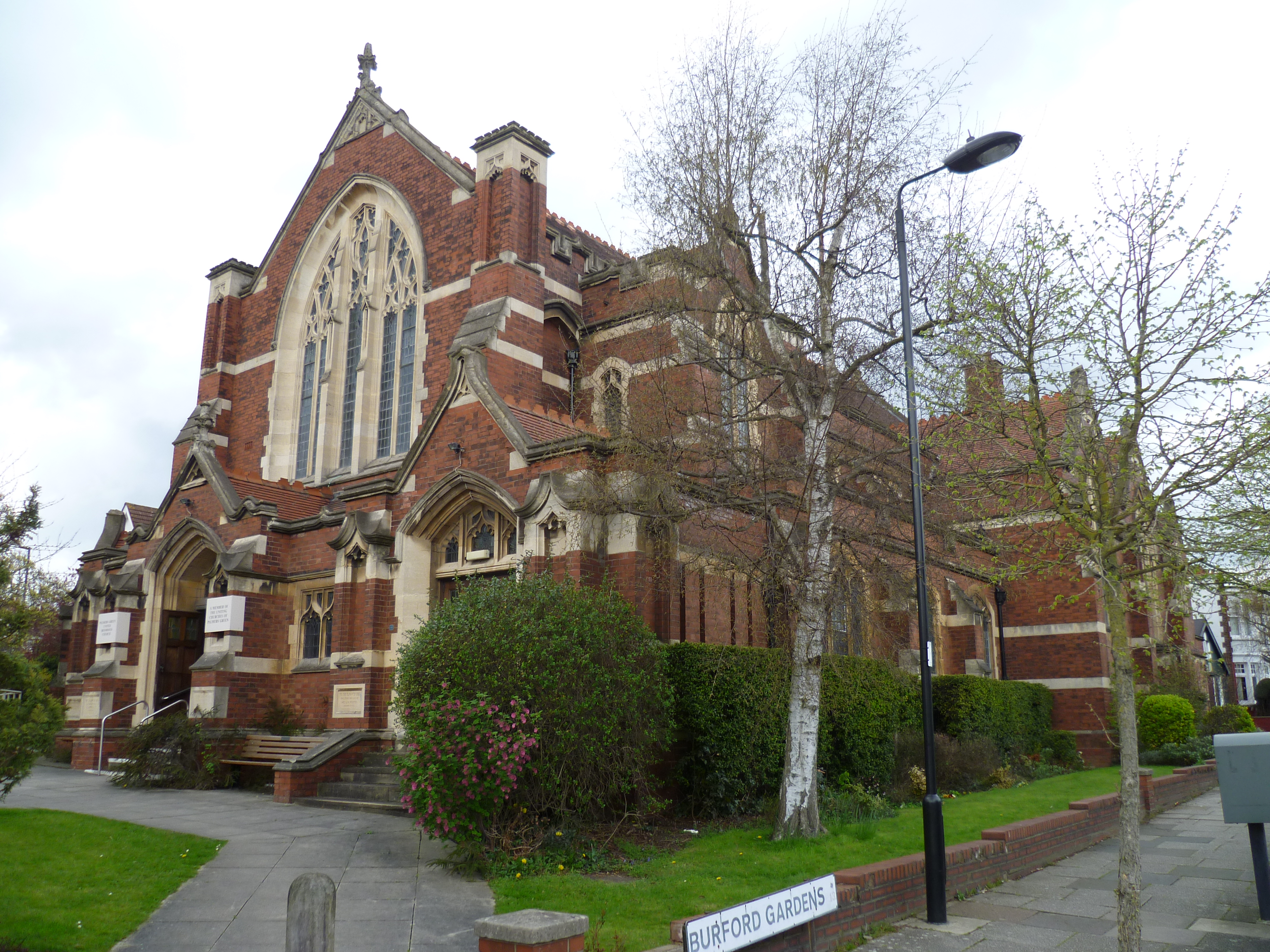
Palmers Green United Reformed Church

Palmers Green United Reformed Church is a united reformed church in Fox Lane, Palmers Green, north London.
