= The Wonder (pub) =

Pub in Enfield, London, England

Coordinates: 51.6631°N 0.0854°W

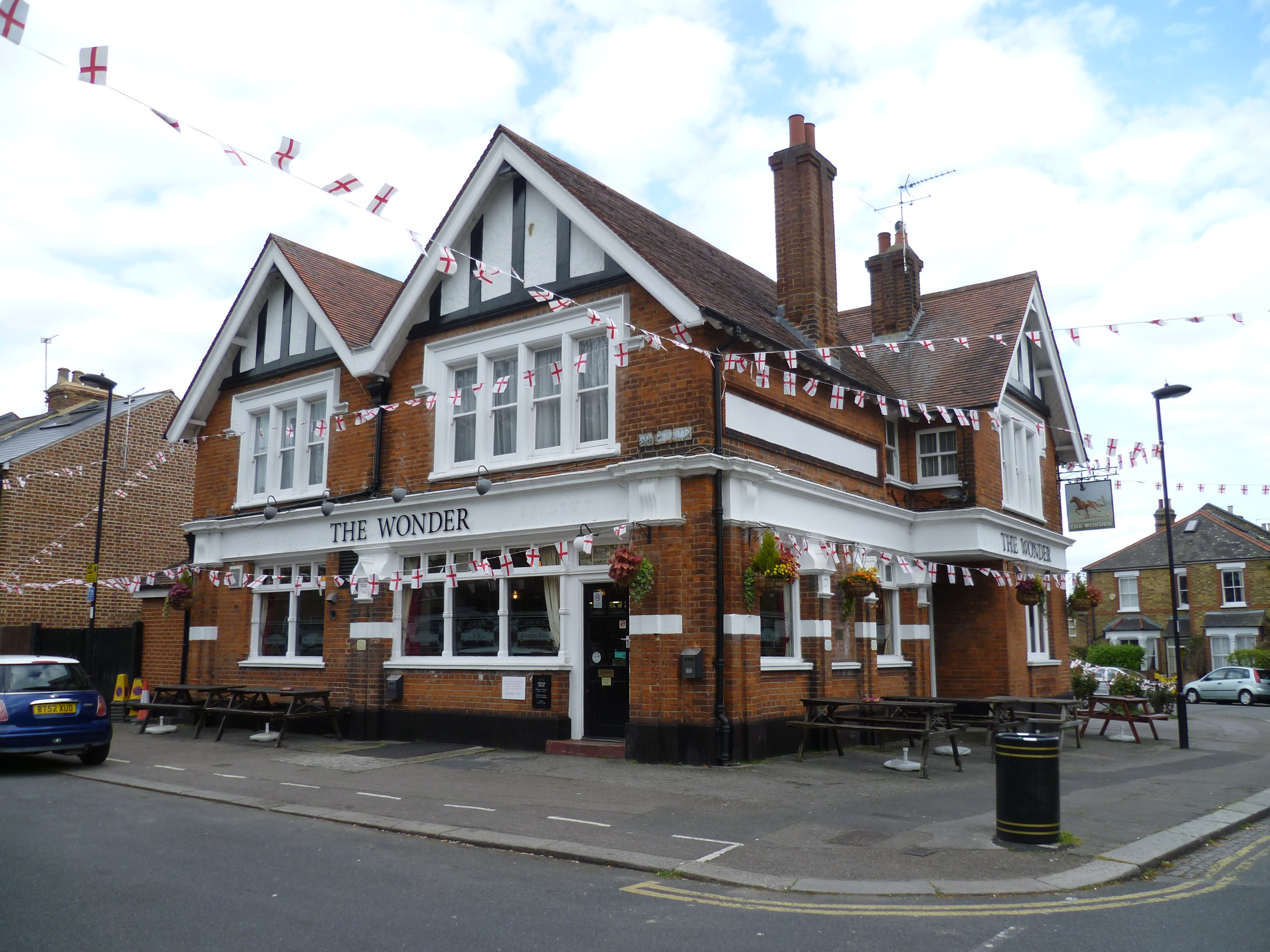
The Wonder

The Wonder is a public house in Batley Road, Enfield, that has been under the management of McMullens since 1877. It is registered as an Asset of Community Value (ACV) with the London Borough of Enfield, one of only three in the borough alongside the Vicars Moor Lawn Tennis Club and The Fox public house in Palmers Green. The interior is on the London Inventory of Historic Pub Interiors.
