= North Middlesex University Hospital =

Hospital in Edmonton, London

- Royal Free London NHS Foundation Trust
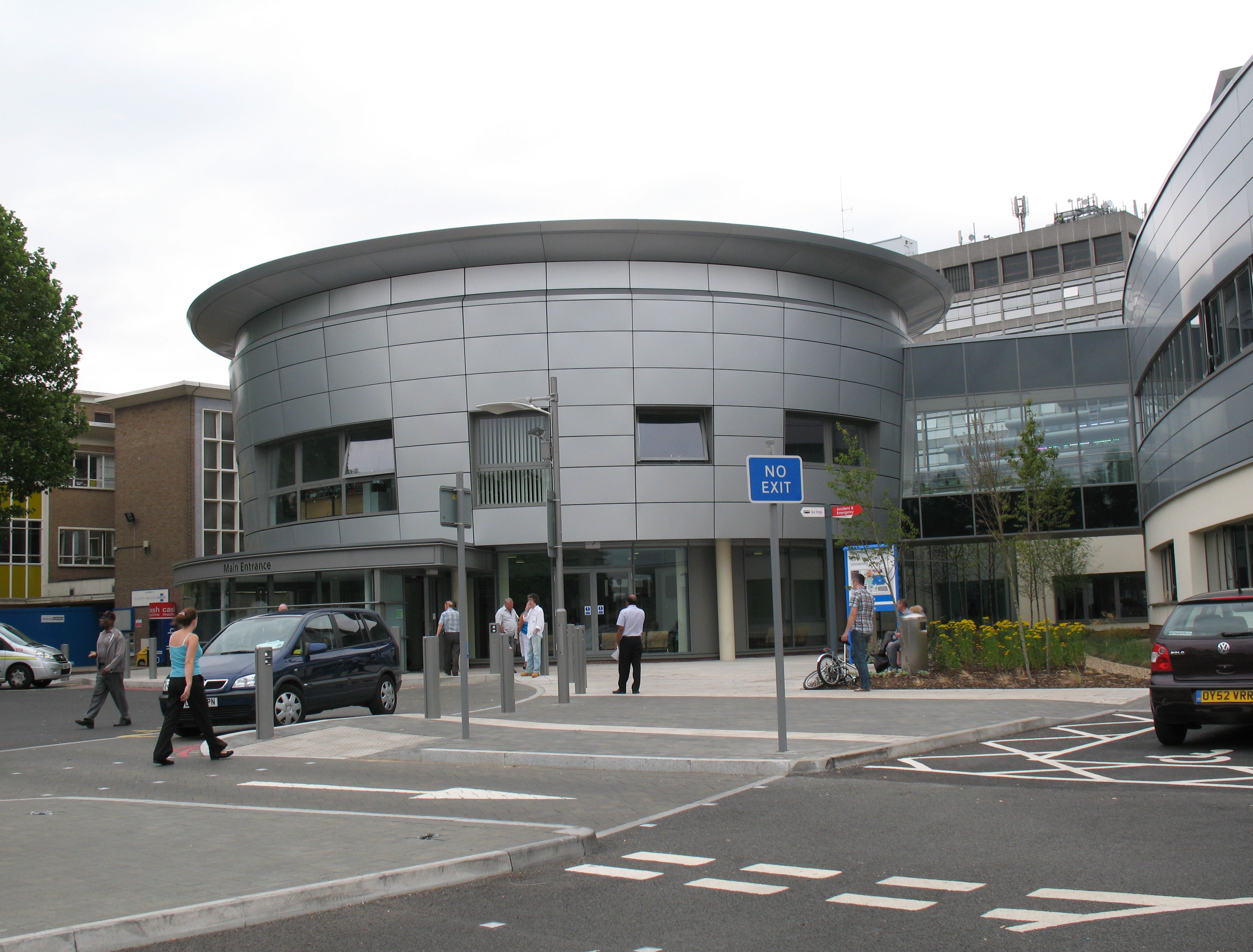
- The main entrance of the hospital

- Location in London

Geography
- Location: Edmonton, London, England
- Coordinates: 51°36′47″N 00°04′30″W

Organisation
- Care system: National Health Service

Services
- Emergency department: Yes
- Beds: 420

History
- Founded: 25 July 1910; 116 years ago

Links
- Website: www.royalfree.nhs.uk/our-locations/north-middlesex-university-hospital

North Middlesex University Hospital, known locally as North Mid, is a district general hospital in Edmonton in the London Borough of Enfield. The hospital was managed by the North Middlesex University Hospital NHS Trust until 1 January 2025, when it merged into the Royal Free London NHS Foundation Trust.

== History ==
The hospital was established as the infirmary for the workhouse at Langhedge Field: it opened on 25 July 1910, and was separated from the workhouse itself by an iron fence, although the two shared a common gate, which still stands today. In 1915 the complex was handed over to the military for use as a military hospital, known as Edmonton Military Hospital. Following its transfer back into civilian hands in 1920, the hospital became the North Middlesex Hospital. Control passed from the Edmonton Board of Guardians to Middlesex County Council in April 1930.

The hospital was the first British hospital to appoint a radiotherapist (Margaret Bromhall) to lead a radiotherapy department, in 1934. In 1938, the workhouse closed, with inmates being transferred to Chase Farm, and its buildings were made available to the hospital.

During the Second World War, six high explosive bombs fell on the site, damaging several buildings. Upon the establishment of the National Health Service in 1948, Southgate Isolation Hospital became an annexe of the North Middlesex and was renamed Greentrees Hospital. The accident and emergency department opened in 1955, having been built on the bombed section of the site. A new outpatients' department was officially opened by Princess Margaret in April 1960.

Part of the hospital site was cleared to make way for the expansion of the North Circular Road in 1973, with the Watermill Lane site being added to the hospital grounds to compensate. Construction of the buildings there was completed the following year. Additions in the 1980s included new pathology laboratories in 1982, a new car park, boilerhouse and estates offices in 1987 and the Pymmes Building (housing four elderly care wards) in 1988.

Temporary operating theatres (theatres 3 and 4) were constructed in 1991 and 1992, respectively. In the late 1990s, parts of the hospital site were sold off for development, to raise funds for the refurbishment of the remaining facilities. As a result, the accident and emergency department was refitted in 1999. In 2000, an NHS Walk-in centre was added. The hospital became the North Middlesex University Hospital in 2001. The Care of the Elderly department transferred its day hospital from St Ann's hospital to the Pymmes building in 2008 to allow greater continuity of care.

New facilities, including a new diagnostic centre, inpatient wards, operating theatres, an outpatients' department and an Accident & Emergency department, were procured under a Private Finance Initiative contract to replace the aging facilities in October 2007. The works were carried out by Bouygues at a cost of £118 million, and the new facilities opened in June 2010.

A new women's and children's unit was procured under the Procure 21 Plus initiative; it was built by Kier Group at a cost of £80 million and opened in November 2013.

== Performance ==
The Trust did poorly in the cancer patient experience survey of 2015/6 and agreed to pair up with Torbay and South Devon NHS Foundation Trust, which did very well, in a scheme intended to "spread and accelerate innovative practice via peer to peer support and learning".

Eleven trainee anaesthetists were withdrawn from the trust by Health Education England in September 2015 because they were not receiving adequate supervision. The General Medical Council had been raising concerns since 2009.

In the last quarter of 2015 it had one of the worst performances of any hospital in England against the four-hour waiting target and in January it was the worst, seeing just 66.4% of A&E patients within 4 hours.

It was ordered by the Care Quality Commission in June 2016 to improve the performance of its Accident and Emergency Department. The inspectors "found there were delays in the initial assessment of patients, in their assessment by a doctor and in moving them to specialist wards and that there were insufficient middle grade doctors and consultants."

In February 2020 the Care Quality Commission praised the continuing improvements in the Accident and Emergency department at North Middlesex University Hospital in an inspection report. England's Chief Inspector of Hospitals, Professor Ted Baker, said: "Care provided at the North Middlesex University Hospital emergency department has continued to improve and I am pleased to see it".
