= Palmers Green =

Area of north London, England

Coordinates: 51.6178°N 0.1092°W

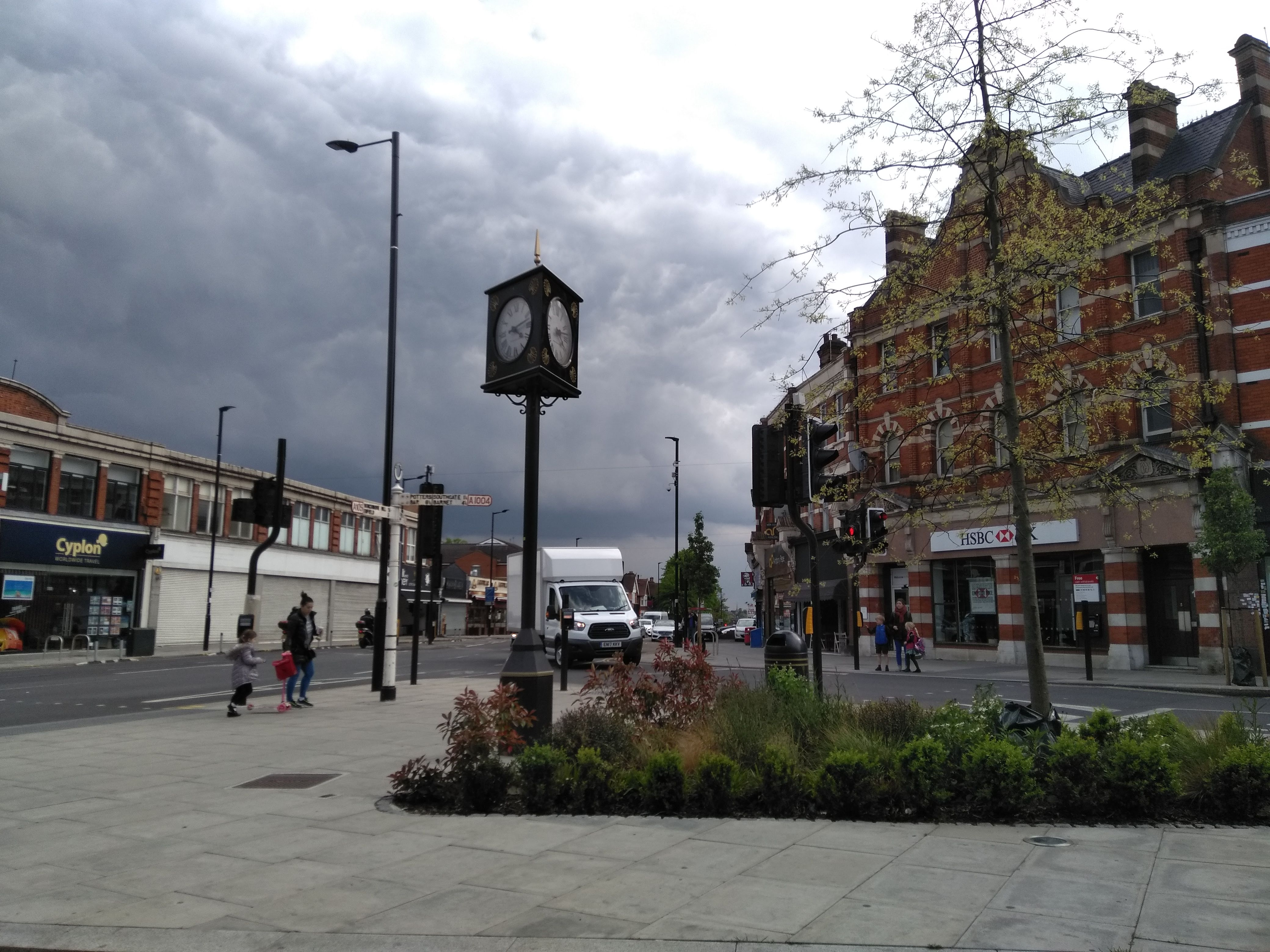
- The Triangle at the centre of Palmers Green

- Location within Greater London
- Population: 15,162 (ward, 2011)
- OS grid reference: TQ309927
  - Charing Cross: 8 mi (12.9 km) S
- London borough: Enfield
- Ceremonial county: Greater London
- Region: London
- Country: England
- Sovereign state: United Kingdom
- Post town: LONDON
- Postcode district: N13
- Dialling code: 020
- Police: Metropolitan
- Fire: London
- Ambulance: London
- UK Parliament: Southgate and Wood Green
- London Assembly: Enfield and Haringey

Palmers Green is a suburban area in north London, England, within the London Borough of Enfield. It is located within the N13 postcode district, around 8 miles (13 km) north of Charing Cross. It is home to the largest population of Greek Cypriots outside Cyprus and is often nicknamed "Little Cyprus" or "Palmers Greek".

== Etymology ==
Recorded as Palmers grene 1608, 'village green associated with a family called Palmer' (mentioned in local records from the 14th century), from the Middle English grene.

== History ==
Palmers Green was once a tiny hamlet in the parish of Edmonton, situated at the junction of Green Lanes and Fox Lane. Its population was very small, and there were no more than a few isolated houses in the mid-17th century. Local records mention a Palmers Field in 1204 and a Palmers Grove in 1340. Palmers Green is mentioned as a highway in 1324 (in Westminster Abbey Muniments).

By 1801, the area had grown to a village of 54 buildings, including two inns (according to the Middlesex Record Office). In 1871 the railway line from Wood Green to Enfield was opened and a station was built in Aldermans Hill to serve Palmers Green (half a mile away from the nearest houses).

The area remained largely undeveloped for thirty more years, as local landowners refused to sell their large estates for building. In 1902, however, large tracts of land were sold for building and the area began to develop rapidly. The first large-scale developments were on the Old Park estate between Fox Lane and Aldermans Hill, and the Hazelwood Park Estate between Hazelwood Lane and Hedge Lane, within the latter development the building that now serves as Hazelwood Infant School and Hazelwood Junior School was built in Hazelwood Lane in 1908.

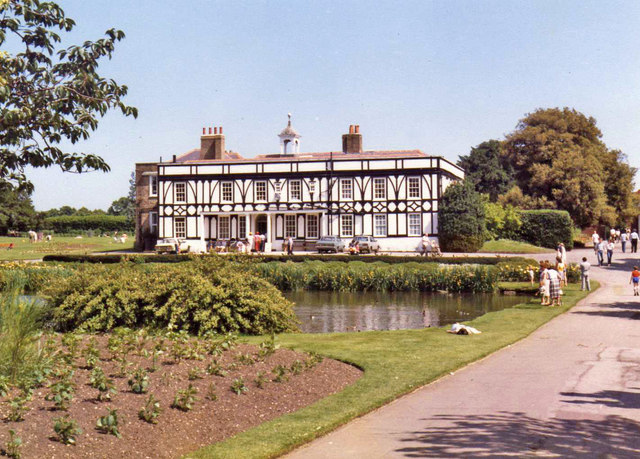
Broomfield House in 1981

Notable local buildings include Broomfield House and Truro House. The former Southgate Town Hall has now been converted into flats. The former Pilgrims Rest (reflecting the name Palmers – "medieval pilgrim who carried a palm branch as a token of having visited the Holy Land") has already been demolished for housing. The Fox public house, which has been in its present guise since 1904, was once the site of the Electric Mouse comedy venue.

The Intimate Theatre was opened in a building that had been built in 1931 as St Monica's Church Hall. Among the actors who performed there were Richard Attenborough, Vivien Leigh, Roger Moore and (in a mime production) David Bowie. It is no longer a repertory theatre and the building is no longer used exclusively for theatrical performances, but it is still often referred to as the Intimate Theatre. In 1992 the building housed a Radio Cracker studio.

In 1988, Palmers Green's only hospital, Greentrees Hospital, was closed and demolished.

== Palmers Green today ==
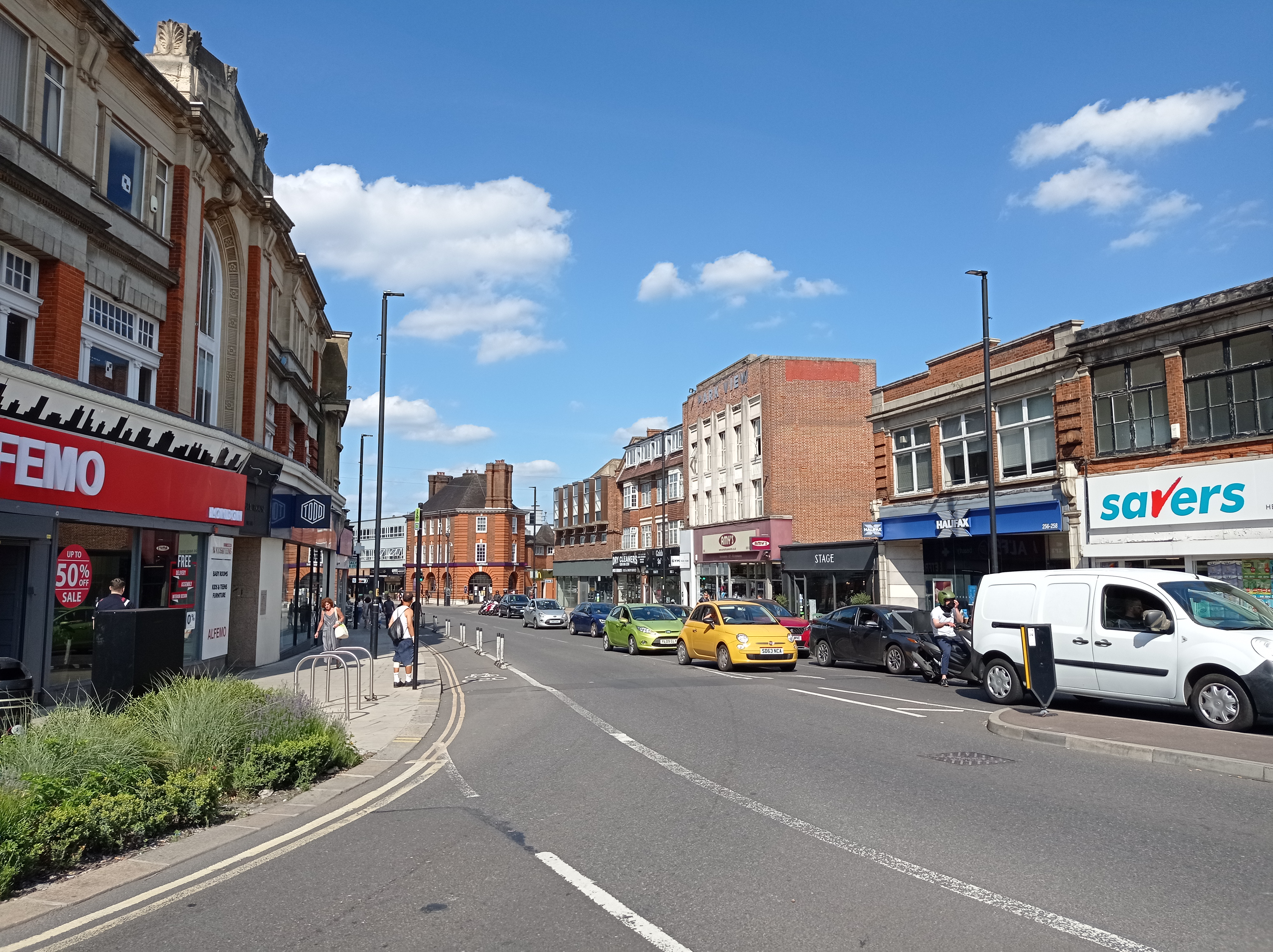
Palmers Green, Green Lanes looking north

There is a parade of shops known as Palmers Green Shopping Centre along Green Lanes, with many restaurants, clothing shops, independently owned cafes, beauty salons, and branches of Superdrug, a former Wetherspoons (The Alfred Herring), Boots and Morrisons.

Broomfield House, in Broomfield Park, remains a burnt-out shell, despite numerous redevelopment proposals and an appearance on the BBC Two programme Restoration. The Conservatory in the park has recently reopened after a refurbishment.

After more than 20 years of discussion, the North Circular A406 was widened to two lanes each way at Bounds Green in 2010, with various junction improvements. Some major congestion still exists on the A406.

Public access to the New River waterway has been improved with waterside paths and access gates.

== Demography ==
According to the 2011 census, 64% of the ward's population is white (34% British, 27% other, 3% Irish). 6% was Indian and 5% of 'any other ethnic group'. The main foreign languages are Turkish, spoken by 795 people, and Greek, spoken by 605.

== Politics ==
Palmers Green is covered by the Southgate and Wood Green constituency for elections to the House of Commons.

Palmers Green is part of the Palmers Green ward for elections to Enfield London Borough Council.

== In popular culture ==
Green Lanes, the high street of Palmers Green, is featured in the "Knight Bus" sequence in the film Harry Potter and the Prisoner of Azkaban.

Palmers Green is mentioned in Jona Lewie's song "You'll Always Find Me in the Kitchen at Parties" (1980). The song's lyrics were written by Lewie's friend Keef Trouble, a fellow member of Brett Marvin and the Thunderbolts. The reference to Palmers Green was prompted by the fact that Trouble had split up with his girlfriend and was at a party thrown by his friend Charles "Charlie Farley" Hallinan near The Fox, Palmers Green. Jona Lewie slightly amended the words, but still mentioned the "do in Palmers Green".

== Notable people ==
- Peter Racine Fricker, composer; lived at 53, Avondale Road 1950–1964
- Christian David Ginsburg, biblical scholar
- Alfred Herring, Victoria Cross recipient
- JME, grime music artist, lived in Palmers Green; with Skepta, has filmed several music videos in the area
- William Orbit, musician and producer; raised in Palmers Green
- Freya Ridings, musician
- Patsy Rowlands, actress; born in Palmers Green, 1931
- Paul Scott, author of The Jewel in the Crown; born in Palmers Green, 1920
- Skepta, grime music artist, lived in Palmers Green; with JME, has filmed several music videos in the area
- Stevie Smith, poet and novelist; lived at No 3 Avondale Road from 1905 until her death in 1971
- Joe Strummer, shared a flat at 18 Ash Grove in 1971 with Tymon Dogg
- Thomas Wilde, 1st Baron Truro, owner of Truro House

== Transport ==
A train service runs at Palmers Green railway station, operated by Great Northern, with southbound trains running to Moorgate and northbound trains running to Stevenage via Hertford North. Some trains also terminate at Gordon Hill. During May 2019, the train service was disrupted due to platform works at Stevenage.

Bus routes 34, 102, 121, 141, 232, 299, 329, W4, W6, W9 and the N29 operate locally.

The North Circular Road and A10 are the main trunk roads. The A111 through Southgate gives access to the M25 motorway at junction 24.

An electric tramway along Green Lanes as far as Winchmore Hill was developed in 1907, helping to further develop the area. The tramway is now long gone.

=== Nearest places ===
- Winchmore Hill
- Edmonton, London
- Tottenham
- Wood Green
- Muswell Hill
- Bowes Park
- Southgate
- Enfield Town

=== Nearest tube stations ===
- Arnos Grove tube station
- Bounds Green tube station
- Southgate tube station
- Wood Green tube station

=== Nearest railway stations ===
- Palmers Green railway station
- Bowes Park railway station
- Winchmore Hill railway station

== Education ==
- Hazelwood Primary School
- Firs Farm Primary
- Oakthorpe Primary
- Palmers Green High School (Independent)
- St Michael at Bowes CE Junior
- Tottenhall Infant
- St Monica's RC Primary
- St Anne's Catholic High School

== Churches ==
- St Monica's Church, Palmers Green (Roman Catholic)
- St John's Church (Anglican)
- Palmers Green Baptist Church
- Palmers Green United Reformed Church

== Mosques ==
- Palmers Green Mosque (Muslim Community & Education Centre)

== Bibliography ==
- Once Upon a Time in Palmers Green, Alan Dumayne, 1988.
- Intimate Memories: The History of the Intimate Theatre, Palmers Green,, Geoff Bowden, 2006.
