= North Middlesex University Hospital NHS Trust =

Former UK healthcare trust

- Type: NHS trust
- Established: 17 December 1990
- Headquarters: Edmonton, London, England
- Hospitals: North Middlesex University Hospital
- Chair: Mark Lam
- Chief executive: Nnenna Osuji
- Staff: 4,068 WTE (2023)
- Website: www.northmid.nhs.uk

North Middlesex University Hospital NHS Trust was an NHS trust which runs North Middlesex University Hospital in Edmonton, London and community services in Enfield. The trust serves more than 350,000 people living in the London boroughs of Enfield and Haringey, as well as the nearby boroughs of Barnet and Waltham Forest.

As of 1 January 2025, it merged into the Royal Free London NHS Foundation Trust.

North Middlesex had worked closely with the Royal Free, and although the board voted against full membership of the Royal Free London group in October 2018, plans remained on the table for a full merger between the trusts.

The Trust provides a full range of adult, elderly and children's services across medical and surgical disciplines. Its specialist services include stroke, HIV/AIDS, cardiology (including heart failure care), haematology, diabetes, sleep studies, fertility and orthopaedics. Its sickle cell and thalassaemia department is nationally recognised as a leading centre for these diseases.

== History ==
The trust was established as the North Middlesex Hospital NHS Trust on 17 December 1990, and became operational on 1 April 1991. It took its current name on 31 July 2001.

On 1 April 2023, the Trust welcomed over 600 new staff following the transfer of Enfield Community Services for a neighbouring Trust; the additional teams include district nurses, community matrons, community physiotherapists, psychologists and many more across a wide range of adult and children’s community services in Enfield.

== Staffing ==
Dr Nnenna Osuji took over as Chief Executive in July 2021 following the departure of Maria Kane OBE in April 2021. Elizabeth McManus, who was chief executive before Maria Kane, resigned in 2017.

The trust has had serious problems with its accident and emergency service failing to meet the Four Hour Emergency Target since 2016, and so had difficulty recruiting senior staff. The General Medical Council and Health Education England considered removing junior doctors from the A&E. It had the poorest A&E waiting times in London with only seven of the 15 consultant posts and seven of 13 middle-grade emergency posts filled. In October 2018 it succeeded in recruiting a substantive chief operating officer from Barking, Havering and Redbridge University Hospitals NHS Trust and Emma Whicher, NHS Improvement’s London medical director to be its medical director.

== Performance ==
The Care Quality Commission reported some improvements in the accident and emergency department after an inspection in September 2016 after earlier rating it as inadequate, but still noted nurse staffing shortages, inadequate checks on agency staff and a poor culture, especially in the maternity unit.

In December 2017 it was reported that during two weeks of data collection it had not had one day with any of its 460 beds unoccupied.

It ending the year 2017/8 with a £29 million deficit. It has considered appealing to Tottenham Hotspur, with which it has an established relationship, for financial help. It was suggested that a 20p surcharge on food, drink and match programmes for fans attending home matches could raise around £300,000 a year.

There were 81 serious incidents reported by the trust in 2016-17 and 88 in 2017-18.

Healthwatch Enfield reported in March 2018 that 75% of the patients who attended the A&E department had not attempted to make a GP appointment. The trust has a GP-led urgent care centre but many patients preferred the A&E department because of the availability of X-ray, CT and MRI scans and blood tests. Maria Kane said: “It’s clear that as a local health system we are not communicating well enough the range of alternatives and how to use them.”

In February 2020 the Care Quality Commission praised the continuing improvements in the Accident and Emergency department at North Middlesex University Hospital in an inspection report. England's Chief Inspector of Hospitals, Professor Ted Baker, said: "Care provided at the North Middlesex University Hospital emergency department has continued to improve and I am pleased to see it". The Care Quality Commission confirmed these sustained improvements in its inspection report in October 2022, where it said that emergency department staff are "skilled, responsive and kind" despite ongoing pressure.
