= Arun Mitra =

Indian poet

- Born: 2 November 1909; Jessore, Bengal Presidency, British India
- Died: 22 August 2000 (aged 90); Kolkata, West Bengal, India
- Occupations: Poet, journalist and professor

Arun Mitra (2 November 1909 – 22 August 2000) was an Indian poet of Bengali, who also translated French literature.

== Selected bibliography ==
English translations of titles are literal in most instances. Transcription of Bengali titles try to represent, as much as possible, the Bengali vernacular and not Sanskrit pronunciation of words.

=== Poetry ===
- Prantorekha [Horizon Line] Arani Publication, Kolkata. 1943
- Utser Dikey [Toward the Source] Dipankar Publication, Kolkata. 1955
- Ghonishto Taap [Intimate Warmth] Tribeni Publishers, Kolkata. 1963
- Mancher Bairey Matitey [Beyond the Stage on the Earth] Saraswat Publication, Kolkata. 1970
- Shudhu Raater Shabdo Noi [Not Just the Rustle of the Night] Nabopatro Publication, Kolkata. 1978 (Winner, Rabindranath Tagore Award)
- Prathom Poli Shesh Pathor [First Silt Last Stone] Karuna Publication, Kolkata. 1981
- Khunjtey Khunjtey Eto Door [So Far After Searching So Long] Pratikhshan Publication, Kolkata. 1986 (Winner, Sahitya Akademi Award)
- Jodio Agun Jhor Dhasha Danga [Although a Bank Ravaged by Firestorm] Pratikhshan Publication, Kolkata. 1988
- Ei Amrito Ei Garol [This Nectar This Venom] Proma Publication, Kolkata. 1991
- Tunikathaar Gherao Thekey Bolchhi [I Speak Surrounded by Small Talk] Anushtup Publication, Kolkata. 1992
- Khara Urboray Chinho Diye Choli [I Put My Signature on Drought and on Plenty] Pratikhshan Publication, Kolkata. 1994
- Andhokaar Jatokkhon Jegey Thakey [As Long As Darkness Remains Awake] Ananda Publishers, Kolkata. 1996
- Ora Uritey Noi [Not in Random Flight] Kobita Pakhshik, Kolkata. 1997
- Bhangoner Mati [Eroding Soil] Dey's Publishing House, Kolkata. 1998
- Uchchhanno Shomayer Shukh Dukkho Ghirey [Surrounded By Joy and Sorrow of a Wayward Time] Ananda Publishers, Kolkata. 1999

=== Anthology ===
- Arun Mitrer Sreshtho Kobita [Best Poems of Arun Mitra] Bharobi Publication, Kolkata. 1972
- Arun Mitrer Sreshtho Kobita [Best poems of Arun Mitra] Narbaak Publication, Kolkata. 1985
- Kabya Shamagro, Vol. I [Collected Poems] Protibhas Publication, Kolkata. 1988
- Kabya Shamagro, Vol. II [Collected Poems] Protibhas Publication, Kolkata. 1992
- Bulaar Raagmala [Bula's Garland of Raags] Proma Publication, Kolkata. 1994
- Nirbachito Premer Kobita [Selected Poems About Love] Bikash Gronthaboli, Kolkata. 1994
- Panchsho Bachhorer Pharashi Kobita [Five Hundred Years of French Poetry] Translation of various French poets Proma Publication, Kolkata. 1994
- Shwanirbachito Sreshtho Kobita [Best Poems—selected by the poet] Abhijat Publication, Kolkata. 1999
- Arun Mitrer Sreshtho Kobita [Best poems of Arun Mitra] Dey's Publishing House, Kolkata. 1999
- Arun Mitrer Anubad Sangraha, Vol I [Collected Translations of Arun Mitra: Candide; Sartre o Tnar Sesh Sanglap; Aragon] Ed. Chinmoy Guha, Gangchil, Kolkata. 2012 ISBN 978-93-81346-24-2.
- Arun Mitrer Prabandha Sangraha, Vol I [Collected Essays of Arun Mitra: Kabir Katha, Kabider Katha; Srijan Sahitya Nanan Bhavna; Farasi Sahitya Prasange] Ed. Chinmoy Guha, Gangchil, Kolkata. 2012. ISBN 978-93-81346-49-5.

=== Narratives ===
- Shikawr Jodi Chena Jai [If Roots Are Known] Bengali novel, Karuna Publication, Kolkata. 1979
- Candide, Ba Ashabad [Candide, or Optimism] Translation of Voltaire, Sahitya Akademi, New Delhi. 1970, 3rd Edition 2001

=== Collections (prose) ===
- Pharashi Shahitto Proshongey [On French literature] Critical essays Proma Publication, Kolkata. 1985
- Srijan Shahitto Nanaan Bhabna [Creative Literature Various Thoughts] Protibhas Publication, Kolkata. 1987
- Aragon [Aragon] On Louis Aragon: Critical/Biographical Proma Publication, Kolkata. 1991
- Khola Chokhey [With Eyes Open] Proma Publication, Kolkata. 1992
- Pather Morey [At the Crossroads] Remembering writers, artists, friends Proma Publication, Kolkata. 1996
- Kobir Katha, Kobider Katha [About Poet and Poets] Essays on poetry and individual poets Kobita Prakhshik, Kolkata. 1997
- Kobita Ami O Amra [Poetry Myself and We] Essays on Bengali and French literature Dey's Publishing House, Kolkata. 1999
- Jibaner Rangey [In the Color of Life] Memoirs Abhijit Publication, Kolkata. 1999

=== Seclected works on Arun Mitra ===
- Kobi Arun Mitra [The Poet Arun Mitra] Collection of critical essays, analyses, commentaries edited by Shankha Ghosh and Arun Sen Parichay/Anushtup, Kolkata. 1986
- Arun Mitra (in English) by Abanti Sanyal "Makers of Indian Literature" series Sahitya Akademi, New Delhi. 2003
