= Greentrees Hospital =

- Enfield District Health Authority
- Shown within the London Borough of Enfield

Geography
- Location: Palmers Green,, Greater London, England, United Kingdom
- Coordinates: 51.6102°N 0.1003°W

Organisation
- Care system: NHS England
- Type: District General (annexe)
- Affiliated university: None

Services
- Emergency department: None
- Beds: 73 (in 1973)

History
- Founded: 1902
- Closed: 1988

Links
- Lists: Hospitals in England

Greentrees Hospital was a hospital in Oakthorpe Park, Palmers Green, North London. Situated in Tottenhall Road, the hospital was built in 1902 as the Southgate Isolation Hospital, commissioned by Southgate Urban District Council.

== History ==
The hospital hosted a meeting of the Infectious Hospitals Matrons’ Association on 20 October 1934, hosted by the hospital's matron, Beatrice M. West, who was also honorary secretary of the Association. The meeting was followed by a tour, "when the Cubicle Block for the very up-to-date treatment of Puerperal Fever, Erysipelas, etc., excited keen interest with its equipment of Ultra Violet and Infra Red Rays for the treatment of complicated fever cases." The Mayor of Southgate then welcomed the Association's members at a tea. Beatrice West had been voted into her role as honorary secretary on 24 June 1933. She left Southgate for Barnet Isolation Hospital, her appointment being announced in the British Journal of Nursing in January 1938.

In 1936, a new putting green and tennis courts were opened at the hospital, and plans were unveiled for new wards, bringing the hospital's capacity up to 200 beds, and a new nurses' home.

On the formation of the National Health Service in 1948 the name was changed to Greentrees Hospital and it was used as an annexe to the North Middlesex Hospital in Edmonton. This annexe was initially used for maternity services, then as a paediatric ear, nose, and throat hospital; a unit for chronically sick patients, and then a geriatric unit. During its time in this latter use, during 1973, the hospital had 73 beds for geriatric patients.

Greentrees was closed in 1988, and the building has since been demolished. However the name Greentrees was still in use as of July 2012, to refer to a 50-bed geriatric rehabilitation unit at St Ann's Hospital, but this unit was scheduled to close with the services being taken over by the Homerton University Hospital and the Whittington Hospital.

An archaeological investigation of the Greentrees site was carried out in 1990 by the Museum of London's Department of Greater London Archaeology. This involved the excavation of 12 trenches, and resulted in the recovery of worked flint, pottery and building materials, including an undated monument and ditch and several early medieval, medieval and post-medieval drains.

== See also ==
- Healthcare in London
