= Intimate Theatre =

Theatre in Palmers Green, London, England

Coordinates: 51.6241°N 0.1029°W

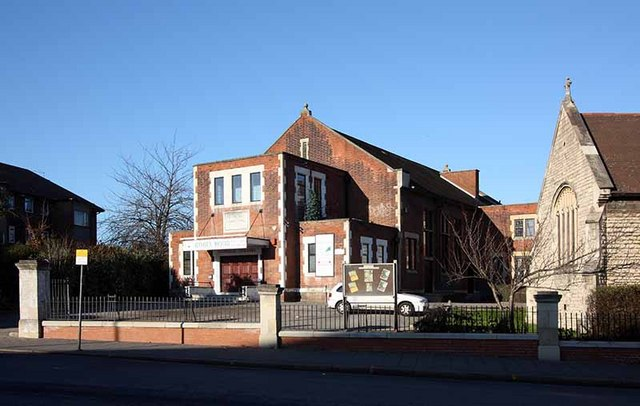
Intimate Theatre building in 2009

The Intimate Theatre was a theatre on Green Lanes in Palmers Green, London from 1937 to 2019, and is the name commonly used for St. Monica's Church Hall.

== History ==
St. Monica's Church Hall was built in 1931, and the actor John Clements turned the building into the Intimate Theatre in 1935. It became a full-time professional repertory theatre in 1937.

After he was demobbed, Roger Moore was a member of the repertory company, and earned about £10 per week. In the late 1940s, the BBC televised 14 plays from the theatre. During the 1960s, the repertory company put on a new play each week, although Max Rietmann's Hot and Cold in all Rooms played to a capacity audience for three weeks in 1962.

In March 1968, David Bowie acted the role of Cloud in Lindsay Kemp's Pierrot In Turquoise at the theatre. In August 1968, Richard Todd starred in Man with a Load of Mischief with Dilys Laye. In 1969, the building reverted for a short time to its use as a church hall, before returning to its use as a theatre. In 1987, the usage as a theatre was reduced to allow the church to hold other events.

By 2012, seating capacity was 435, and the theatre was being used by Protos Theatre & Arts Group, The London Pantomimers, Acorn Theatre Company, Saint Monica's Players, and other amateur drama groups. In January 2019, it was placed on the Heritage at Risk Register after the church owners said they wanted to demolish the building to replace it with a new parish hall.

== Proposed redevelopment ==
In November 2020 and again on 8 March 2022, Enfield Council's Planning Committee voted unanimously to grant planning permission to the redevelopment scheme. As of 2026, the building remained intact and continued to be included by the Theatres Trust on its annual list of Theatres at Risk.
