= Annada Shankar Ray =

Indian writer, poet, essayist (1904–2002)

- অন্নদাশঙ্কর রায়
- Born: 15 March 1904; Dhenkanal State, British India (now in Odisha, India)
- Died: 28 October 2002 (aged 98); Kolkata, West Bengal, India
- Occupations: Writer, poet, essayist
- Writing career
- Language: Bengali, English, Odia
- Notable works: Pathe Prabaase, Banglar Reneissance
- Notable awards: Padma Bhushan

Annada Shankar Ray (15 March 1904 – 28 October 2002) was an Indian poet and essayist in Bengali. He also wrote some Odia poetry.

He wrote several Bengali poems criticising the Partition of India. Most notable is "Teler shishi bhaanglo bole khukur pare raag karo. Among his many essays, the book Banglar Reneissance has an analytical history of the cultural and social revolution in Bengal. Ray's best known work is Pathe Prabaase, a diary of his trip in Europe in 1931. He died in Kolkata on 28 October 2002.

== Family history ==
This Bengali icon's ancestral place is Kotrung (present-day Uttarpara Kotrung) in the Hooghly district of West Bengal. His ancestors migrated from Kotrung to Balasore district of Odisha. His grandmother, Durgamoni, was the daughter of an aristocrat Bengali Sen family of Jajpur . Annada Shankar Ray's father was Nimaicharan Ray and his mother was the daughter of an aristocrat Kayasth family of Cuttack. Nimaicharan Ray shifted his base to Dhenkanal following a family feud.

== Educational life ==
Ray graduated in English from Ravenshaw College in Cuttack. He topped the list of Indian Civil Service examinees in 1927. He had failed to make the mark in the previous year, being cut off by one rank. He was the first ICS officer from the territory later forming the state of Orissa.

== Literary career ==
After serving in various administrative posts, he sought voluntary retirement in 1951 to devote himself to literary pursuits. Ray was a Gandhian in politics and Rabindranath Tagore inspired his literature. His first published book was Tarunya (1928), which gave him a footing as an essayist. In 1928, his first collection of poetry named Rakhi also got published. It includes poems he composed when was in England and they are creations based on Romantic imaginations thus involving the innate bond of nature and human emotions. His first two novels were Asamapika and Agun Niye Khela. As an essayist, he was urbane and sophisticated and combined in his craft two different styles of prose, represented by Tagore and Pramatha Choudhury. A significant breakthrough in his literary career came with the publication of Pathe Prabase, a diary of his Europe trip, in 1931. Ray also established himself as a short-story writer. His collections include Prakritir Parihas (1934), Man Pavan (1946), Kamini Kanchan (1954) and Katha.

A Bengali rendering of a short story by Tolstoy and an appraisal of Sarat Chandra Chattopadhyay’s essay Narir Mulya marked his debut on the literary scene at the age of 16.

In Oriya, the poetry "Sabita" finds place in higher studies of the language at college level, making him one of the few poets to have the distinction of getting such acclaim from two different language speaking states of India.

== Works ==
Annadashankar Roy was a contributor of both prose and poetry.

=== Novels ===
- Satyasatya (6 Novels)
  1. Jar Jetha Desh
  2. Oggatobash
  3. Kolonkoboti
  4. Dukkhomochon
  5. Morter Sorgo
  6. Opposaron
- Agun Niye Khela
- Osomapika
- Putul Niye Khela
- Na
- Konna

=== Essays ===
- Tarunno
- Amra
- Jibonshilpi
- Eahara
- Jiyonkathi
- Deshkalpatro
- Prottoy
- Notun Kore Bacha
- Adhunikota
- Art

=== Autobiography ===
- Binur Boi
- Potheprobashe
- Japane

=== Short story collections ===
- Prokritir Porihash
- Du Kan Kata
- Hason Sakhi
- Mon Pahon
- Jouban Jala
- Kamini Kanchon
- Ruper Day
- Golpo

== Award ==
He received the Vidyasagar Smriti Award from the state government and the Padma Bhushan. He was made a fellow of the Sahitya Akademi in 1989. The Visva Bharati conferred on him the Desikottama and an honorary D.Litt. He also received the Rabindra Puraskar, the Ananda Puraskar twice and the Zaibunnisa Award of Bangladesh.
