= Girish Mancha =

Theatre auditorium in Bagbazar, Kolkata, West Bengal, India

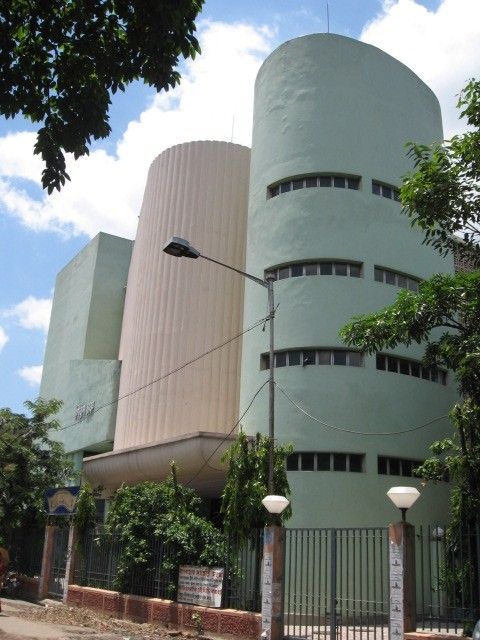
- Girish Mancha
- Interactive map of the Girish Mancha area

General information
- Status: Active
- Location: Bagbazar, 76/1, Bagbazar Street Kolkata 700003, Kolkata, India
- Coordinates: 22°36′14.67″N 88°21′53.17″E
- Inaugurated: 1 July 1986
- Owner: West Bengal Government

Girish Mancha is a theatre auditorium located in Bagbazar, Kolkata, West Bengal, India. The auditorium was inaugurated on 1 July 1986 by Chief Minister of West Bengal (at that time) Jyoti Basu. The auditorium was named after Girish Chandra Ghosh.

The design of the auditorium was done by Public Works Department and they also do the maintenance work of this auditorium. This auditorium is under the administrative central of the Information and Cultural Affairs Department Government of West Bengal. This auditorium is regularly used by different theatre groups. Girsih Mancha is one of the most active theatre auditoriums of Kolkata.
