= Sisir Mancha =

Auditorium in Kolkata, West Bengal, India

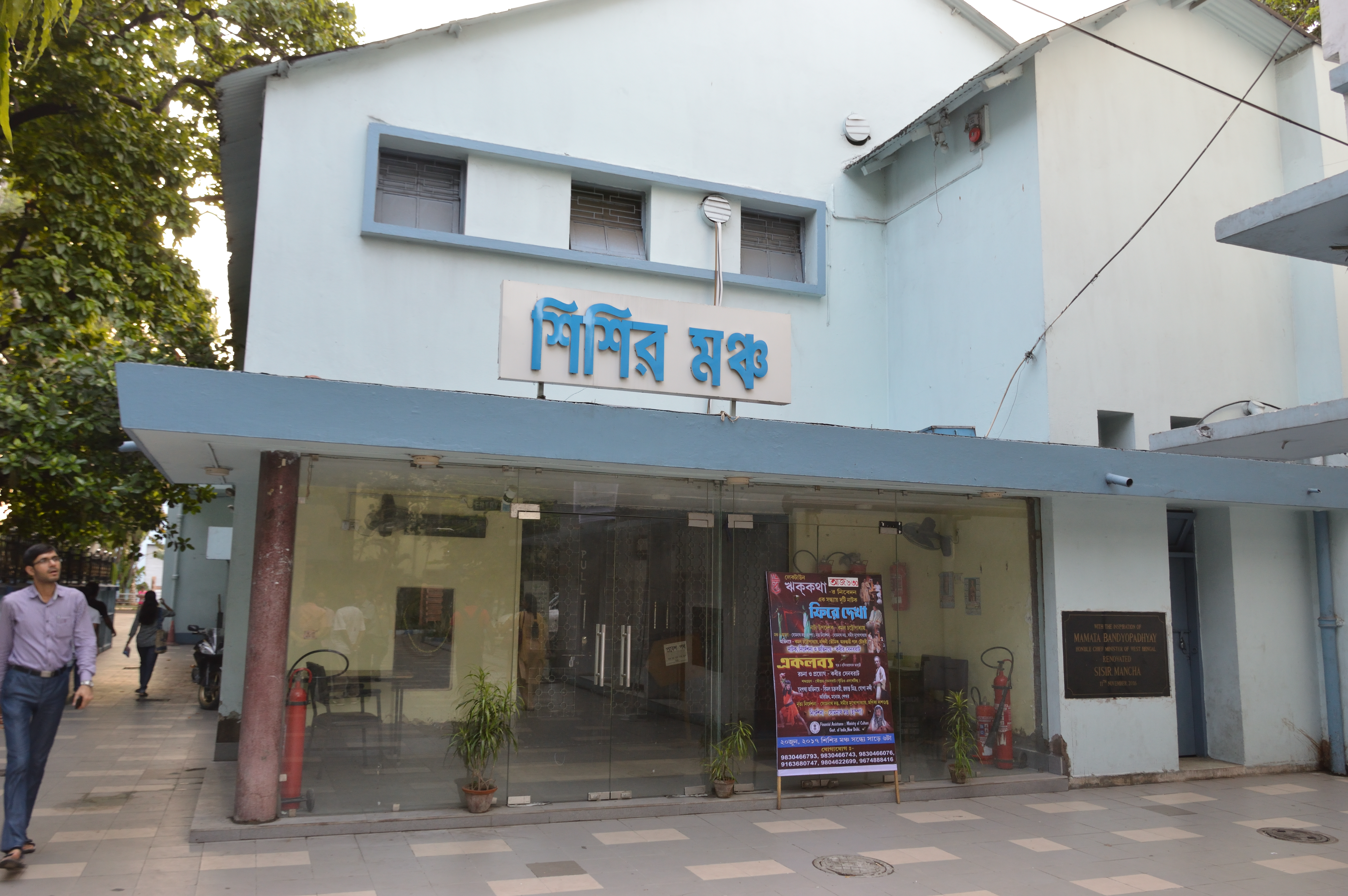

General information
- Status: Active
- Location: 1/1, AJC Bose Road, Kolkata - 700020, Kolkata, India
- Inaugurated: 1978
- Owner: West Bengal Government

Sisir Mancha is an auditorium located on Acharya Jagadish Chandra Bose Road in Kolkata, West Bengal, India. This auditorium is regularly used for Bengali theatres. The auditorium is adjacent to Rabindra Sadan-Nandan Complex. The theatre auditorium is named after Bengali dramatist Sisir Kumar Bhaduri and it was established in 1978.
