= Akashlina =

Poem of Jibanananda Das

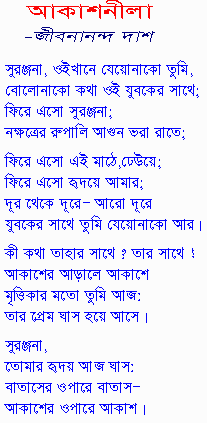
Akashleena Lyrics

"Akashleena" (Bengali: আকাশলীনা) is one of the most well-known poems written by Bengali poet Jibanananda Das. It was composed in the late 1930s, and was first published in 1940 in a verse collection named Satti Tarar Timir.

== Transliteration and translation ==
Shuronjona, oi khane jeyo nako tumi,
Bolonako kotha oi juboker sathe;
Fire esho Shuronjona;
Nokhhotrer rupali agun bhora rat-e;

Fire esho ei mathe, dhew-e
Fire esho hridoye amar;
Dur theke dure- aro dure
Juboker shathe tumi jeyo nako ar.

Ki kotha tahar sathe? tar sathe!
Akasher arale akashe
Mrittikar moto tumi aj;
Tar prem ghash hoye ashe.

Shuronjona tomar hridoye aj ghash,
tumar hridoy aj ghash;
Batasher opare batash-
Akasher opare akash.

Translation:

Suranjana never go there,
Talk not with that buffoon:
Come back
On this night of silvery star-fire.

Come back to this field, to this wave;
Come back to my heart;
Don't go any more with that buffoon
Further and yet more far.

To him what the hell you talk,
Sky beyond the sky:
You seem to be clay
His love comes to you like grass.

Suranjana
Your heart is grass today:
Wind beyond the wind
Sky beyond the sky?

== Background ==
"Akashleena" was composed by Das in the late 1930s when he was living in Calcutta, after he lost his position as Assistant Lecturer at the City College. The relevant manuscript was discovered and labelled Book-9 while being preserved in the National Library of Calcutta. The poem occurs on page 12 of the manuscript. It was first published in December 1940 in a verse collection named Satti Tarar Timir, and was also included in the 1940 collection Modern Bengali Poetry. It is the first poem of his third collection of poetry published in 1942 under the title Akashleena.

== Translation into English ==
Starting with Das himself, Akashleena has been translated into English many times. Translators include Martin Kirkman, Puroshuttam Das with Shamosri Das, P. Lal, Mary Lago in collaboration with Tarun Gupta, Chidananda Dasgupta, Ananda Lal, Clinton B. Seely, Sukanta Chaudhuri, Anupam Banerjee, Hayat Saif, Faizul Latif Chowdhury, Fakrul Alam, Anjana Basu, Joe Winter, Ron. D K Banergjee, Joydeep Bhattacharya, Arun Sarker, and Amitabha Mukerjee. In some cases, translations differ from the translation of Das himself.

== See also ==
- Banalata Sen, a poem by Jibanananda Das
