= Kavita (poetry magazine) =

Bengali poetry magazine

Kavita (Bengali: কবিতা), also spelled Kobita, is a Bengali poetry magazine that, from the 1930s until 1961, played a central role in introducing modernism into Bengali poetry. It was edited and published by poet Buddhadeva Bose.

== History ==
The first literary magazine published by poet Buddhadeva Bose was Pragati. He was then living in Dhaka. It was short-lived and the last issue was published in 1929. Four years after migrating from Dhaka to Calcutta in 1931, Buddhadeva decided to publish a literary magazine exclusively for poetry. He named it Kavita. He was then living in 'Golam Mohammad Mansion' in Calcutta city. The first issue of the Kavita was published from there in the month of October 1935. For the first two years, Kavita was co-edited by Buddhadeva Bose and Premendra Mitra while poet Samar Sen worked as the assistant editor. It is notable that Kavita was a poetry magazine-styled after the Poetry published by Harriet Monroe from Chicago. While discussing Bengali poetry, Edward Thomson referred to the first issue of Kavita in The Times Literary Supplement of 1 February 1936.

Buddhadeva Bose lived at 202 Rasbihari Avenue, Calcutta for several decades starting in 1936. This house was named Kavita Bhavan since it was home to Kavita for a long time. Kavita continued for twenty-five years. Its last issue was published in March 1961.

== Contributors ==
Notable contributors included:

- Abu Sayeed Ayyub
- Achintya Kumar Sengupta
- Ajit Dutta
- Al Mahmud
- Alauddin Al-Azad
- Amiya Chakravarty
- Anwar Pasha
- Bishnu Dey
- Buddhadeva Bose
- Jibanananda Das
- Kazi Nazrul Islam
- Naresh Guha
- Premendra Mitra
- Rabindranath Tagore
- Samar Sen
- Shamsur Rahman
- Shankha Ghosh
- Subhash Mukhopadhyay
- Sudhindranath Dutta

== International number, 1960 ==
The 100th issue of Kavita was published in 1960 as an international edition. It contained as many as 69 poems in translation that included Bengali poems into English and foreign language poems into Bengali. Buddhadeva informed that his intention was to present a "Meeting ground of nations".

== Bilingual edition of Kavita, 1963 ==
Buddhadeva Bose published a bilingual edition of Kavita in 1953.

== Kavita collection ==
Selected poems and articles published in the Kavita have been collected in a three-volume anthology.

== See also ==
- Kallol
