= Banalata Sen =

Bengali poem by Jibanananda Das

- by Jibanananda Das
- First published in: Kavita Magazine
- Language: Bangla
- Publication date: December 1935

Full text
- bn:জীবনানন্দ দাশের শ্রেষ্ঠ কবিতা/বনলতা সেন at Wikisource

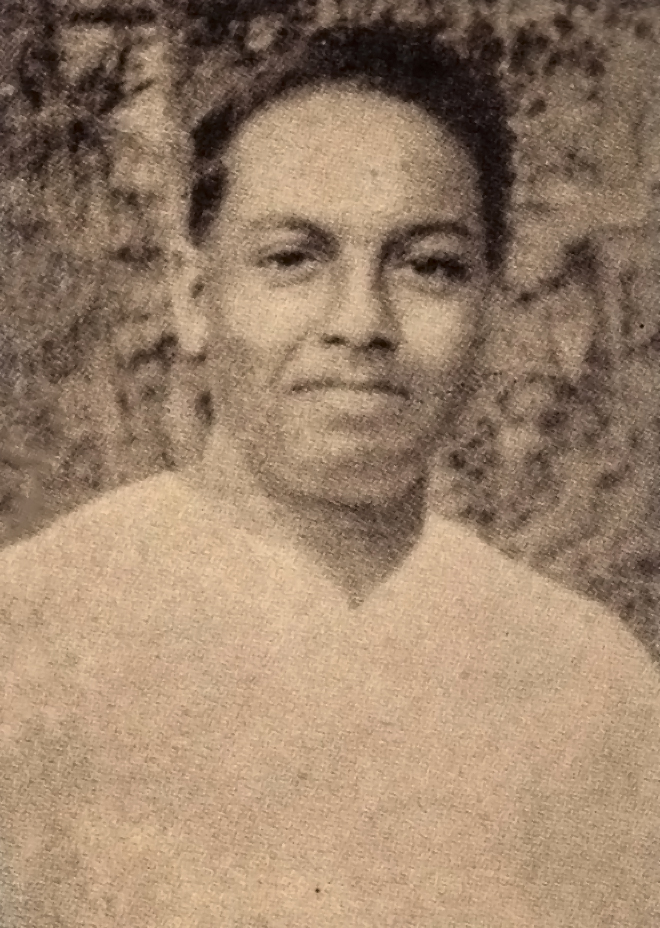
Young Jibanananda Das, writer of the poem

Banalata Sen (Bengali: বনলতা সেন) is a Bengali poem written in 1942 by the poet Jibanananda Das that is one of the most read, recited and discussed poems of Bengali literature. The title of this lyric poem is a female character referred to by name in the last line of each of its three stanzas. A draft of the poem was also discovered that widely differs from the final version. Poet Jibanananda Das was a quiet person who preferred to live in obscurity. Until the discovery of his diaries in the mid-1990s, it was considered unlikely that he could have been in love with a woman, with or without the name of Banalata Sen. However, Banalata Sen of Natore, a tiny town in the Rajshahi area of what was then United Bengal, has become an emblem of feminine mystery as well as beauty and love.

== Introductory notes ==
"Banalata Sen" was composed by Jibanananda Das in 1934 when he was living in Calcutta, at a time in his life when he had lost his job as assistant lecturer at the City College, Kolkata. The relevant manuscript was discovered and labelled Book-8 while preserved in the National Library of Calcutta; the poem occurs on page 24 of this manuscript. It was first published in the December 1935 issue of the poetry magazine Kavita, edited by poet Buddhadeva Bose. It is also the first poem of his third collection of poetry published in 1942 under the title Banalata Sen. Earlier, the lyric was collected in Modern Bengali Poetry, jointly edited by Abu Sayeed Ayub and Hirendranath Mukhopadhyaya, published in 1939. Although popularly regarded as a romantic lyric, the poet's historical sense of human existence is unmistakably the underlying essence.

== Description ==
বনলতা সেন

হাজার বছর ধরে আমি পথ হাঁটিতেছি পৃথিবীর পথে,
সিংহল সমুদ্র থেকে নিশীথের অন্ধকারে মালয় সাগরে
অনেক ঘুরেছি আমি; বিম্বিসার অশোকের ধূসর জগতে
সেখানে ছিলাম আমি; আরো দূর অন্ধকারে বিদর্ভ নগরে;
আমি ক্লান্ত প্রাণ এক, চারিদিকে জীবনের সমুদ্র সফেন,
আমারে দুদণ্ড শান্তি দিয়েছিলো নাটোরের বনলতা সেন।

চুল তার কবেকার অন্ধকার বিদিশার নিশা,
মুখ তার শ্রাবস্তীর কারুকার্য; অতিদূর সমুদ্রের 'পর
হাল ভেঙে যে নাবিক হারায়েছে দিশা
সবুজ ঘাসের দেশ যখন সে চোখে দেখে দারুচিনি-দ্বীপের ভিতর,
তেমনি দেখেছি তারে অন্ধকারে; বলেছে সে, 'এতোদিন কোথায় ছিলেন?'
পাখির নীড়ের মত চোখ তুলে নাটোরের বনলতা সেন।

সমস্ত দিনের শেষে শিশিরের শব্দের মতন
সন্ধ্যা আসে; ডানার রৌদ্রের গন্ধ মুছে ফেলে চিল;
পৃথিবীর সব রঙ নিভে গেলে পাণ্ডুলিপি করে আয়োজন
তখন গল্পের তরে জোনাকির রঙে ঝিলমিল;
সব পাখি ঘরে আসে—সব নদী—ফুরায় এ-জীবনের সব লেনদেন;
থাকে শুধু অন্ধকার, মুখোমুখি বসিবার বনলতা সেন।

The poem consists of three stanzas, each comprising six lines composed in the Bengali metrical pattern Aksherbritta or Poyar. The title of this lyric poem, Banalata Sen, is a female character referred to by name in the last line of each of its three stanzas. The poem is self-narrated by an unnamed traveller. Banalata Sen is the name of a woman whom the poem describes as being from the town of Natore, a town in Bangladesh.

In the first stanza, the traveller describes seeing her after having wandered upon the earth over thousands of years. The narrator says that it has been a thousand years since he started trekking the earth. He describes it as a long journey in the night's darkness from the Ceylonese waters to the Malayan seas. From this geographical expanse, he goes on to the extent of time, saying that, in the course of his wanderings, he has traversed the fading world of Bimbisara and Ashoka. He adds that he went further, to the forgotten city of Vidharbha. Finally he speaks of himself as now being a weary soul, although the ocean of life around continues to foam, and adds that in the meanwhile he had a few soothing moments with Natore's Banalata Sen.

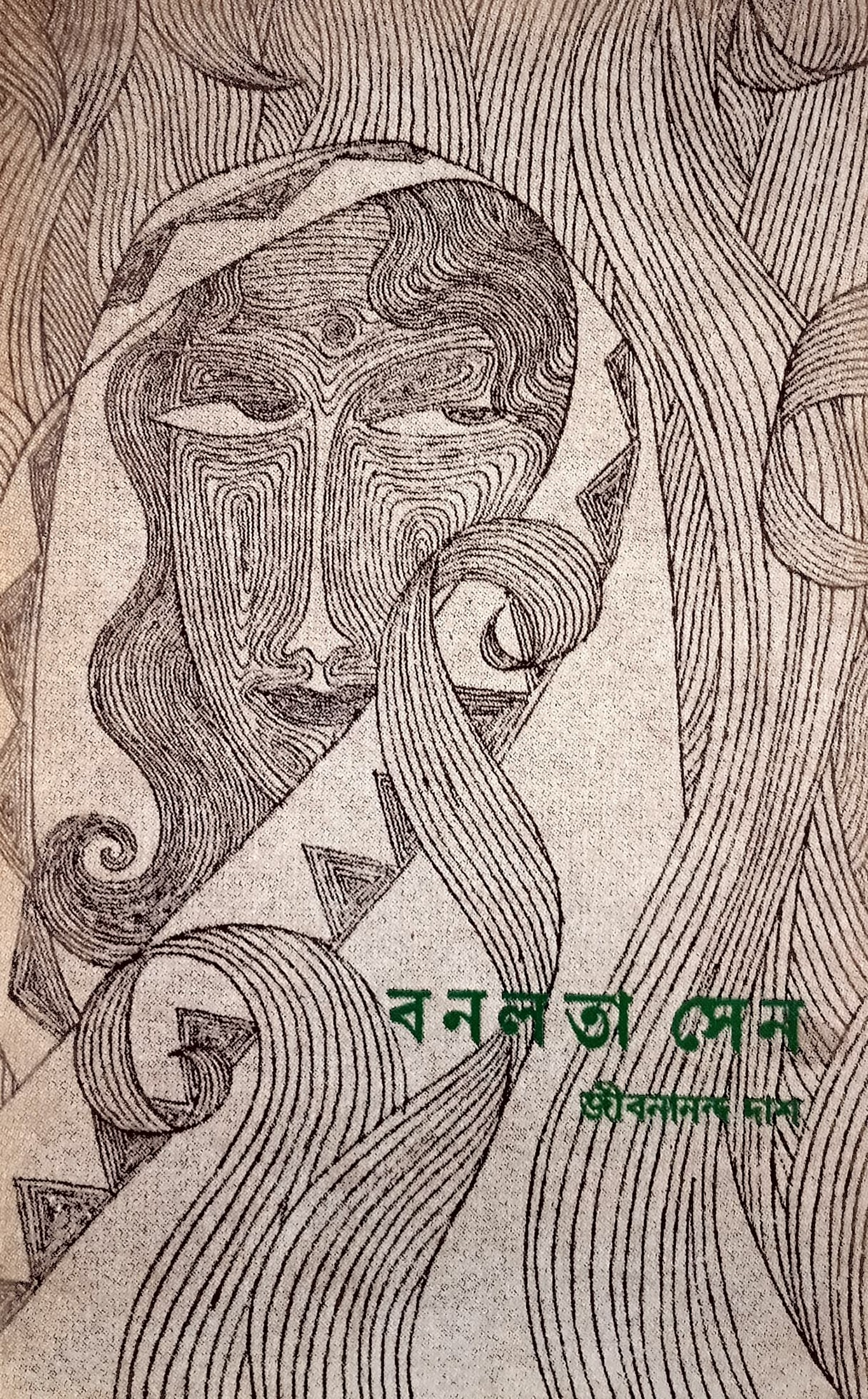
Signet edition of Banalata Sen, drawn by Satyajit Ray

In the second stanza, the traveller describes Banalata Sen. First, he compares her hair with the dark night of long-lost Vidisha. Then he compares her face with the fine sculpture of Sravasti. Then the traveller-narrator recollects that when he saw her in the shadow, it was like a mariner whose ship was wrecked in a faraway sea spotting verdant land among barren islands. In the first encounter, Banalata Sen, raising her comforting eyes, inquires of him, "Where had you been lost all these days?"

In the third stanza, the traveller returns from geography and history and recalls Banalata Sen with emotion. He says that when at the day's end evening crawls in like the sound of dews and the kite shakes off the smell of sun from its wings; and then, when all colours take leave from the world except for the flicker of the hovering fireflies as all birds come home and rivers retire, a time comes when all transactions of the day are done. Then nothing remains but darkness when the traveller would like to sit face-to-face with Banalata Sen and share with her his ballad of stories.

The poet-narrator proceeds by alluding to different mythological and ancient persons, places and events. He describes having wandered from the Ceylonese ocean to the seas of Malaya, having travelled in ancient India in the times of Emperor Bimbisara, and centuries later, in the times of Ashoka the Great. He describes having wandered in darkness in the ancient cities of Vidarbha and Vidisha, yet, for his tired soul, the only moment of peace in any age was with Banalata Sen of Natore.

The lyric Banalata Sen is the most representative of the essence of Jibanananda's poetry and exemplifies his use of imagery. The weary traveller is an interactive motif in his poetry. The poem itself uses four key images comprehensively, namely the darkness, flowing water, passage of time, and a woman. Jibanananda progressively develops these same four images throughout the poem, metamorphosing these from remoteness to intimacy, dimness to distinction and from separation to union.

== Choosing the name ==
Banalata is a feminine name in the Bengali language that would have been fashionable in the Bengali middle-class Bhadralok community of Jibanananda's parents' generation. The surname "Sen" ordinarily denotes the Vaidya caste to which Jibanananda's own family belonged before they became Brahmo. Natore is a small mofussil town, now in Bangladesh, that developed during the colonial era at a time when a number of towns developed throughout Bengal, spurred by the colonial economy and social changes. That places her as a contemporary woman, but Jibanananda describes her in terms of forgotten and classical locations, essentially portraying her as 'timeless'. She is as much a spirit as a woman. Popularly, she is an emblem of beauty. Famous Indian painters who have tried to capture Banalata Sen in their works include Ganesh Paine and Jogen Chaudhuri.

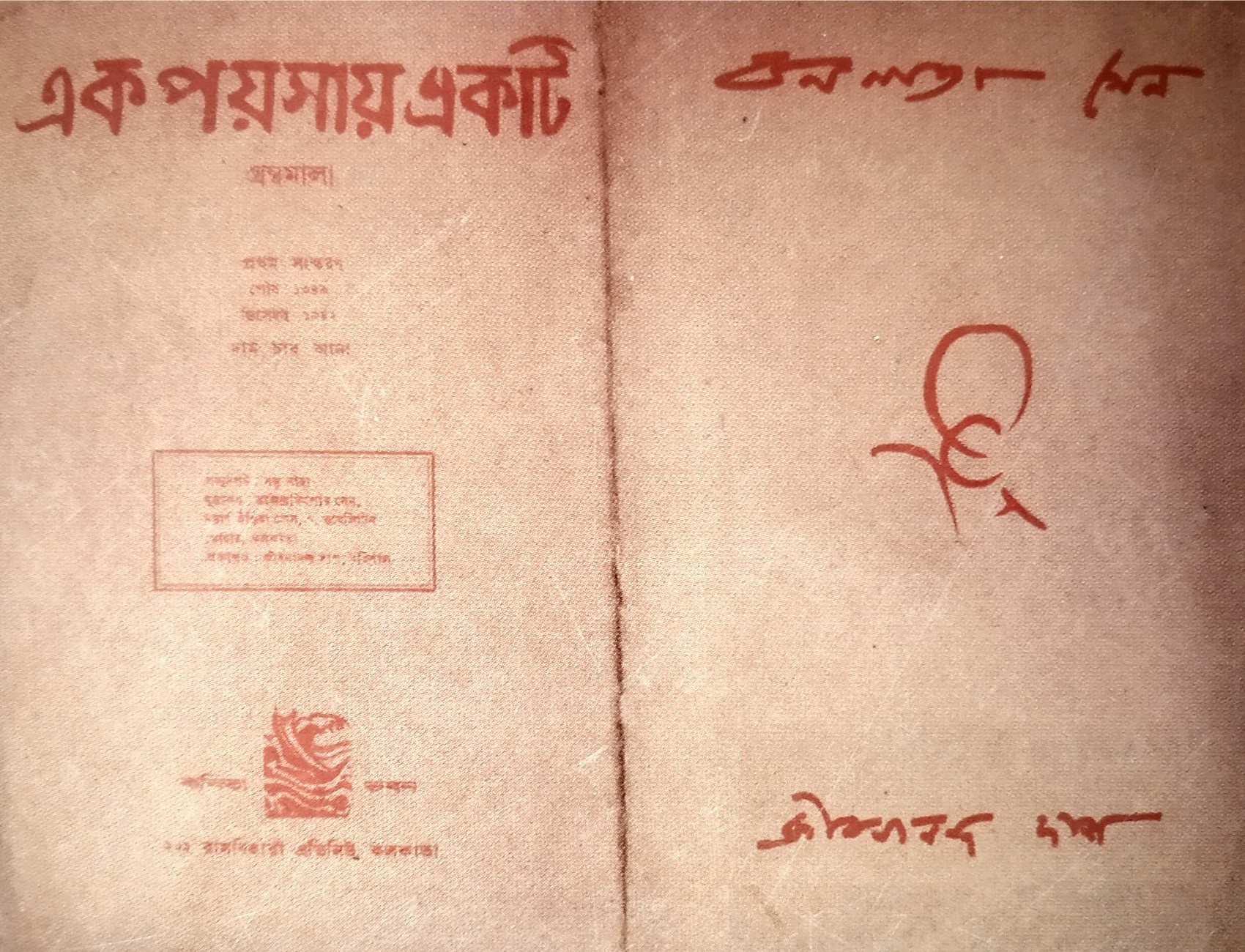
First Edition of Banalata Sen published from The Kavita Bhavan by Buddhadev Bose

Banalata Sen is a recurrent theme in Jibanananda's work. Jibanananda's poetry, with his characteristic rich tapestry of imagery, repeatedly portrays the image of human fulfillment personified by a woman—in this poem, Banalata Sen. For a long time it has been held that no one like Banalata Sen actually existed in Jibanananda's life. However, Jibanananda first used this name in Karubasona, by and large an autobiographical novel he wrote in 1932, which was never discussed. The novel was first published in 1986, many years after his death in 1954. There Banalata, a young maiden, happens to be the neighbour of the protagonist.

== Poe's To Helen ==
Often Jibanananda's Banalata Sen has been compared with To Helen by Edgar Allan Poe. In a certain sense, Banalata Sen is akin to "To Helen". However, while Helen's beauty is the central theme in Poe's work, for Jibanananda, Banalata Sen is merely a framework to hold his anxiety for apparently endless human existence on earth since primordial time. She has occurred with various names like Shaymoli, Sobita, Suronjana, etc. However, one can see that while Poe has ended by appreciating the beauty of a woman, Jibanananda has gone far deeper, and on the landscape of a woman's beauty has painted the expanse of human existence both in terms of time and topography, drawing attention to the ephemeral existence of human beings. Unlike the poetry of many others, Jibanananda's poetry is the result of filtered interaction between emotions and intellect. In the endless tumultuous continuum of 'time', Banalata Sen is a dot of quietude and tranquillity. Banalata Sen is a feminine emblem that Jibanananda created in his virtual world and faced on many occasions with wonder and questions, as embodied in different poems. In sum, although popularly regarded as a romantic lyric, the poet's historical sense of human existence is unmistakably the underlying essence.

== Translation into English ==
Starting with poet Jibanananda Das himself, Banalata Sen has been translated into English by many hands. They include Martin Kirkman, one with the initials S.D., Puroshuttam Das together with Shamosri Das, P. Lal, Mary Lago in collaboration with Tarun Gupta, Pritish Nandy, Chidananda Dasgupta, Ananda Lal, Clinton B. Seely, Sukanta Chaudhuri, Anupam Banerjee, Hayat Saif, Fakrul Alam, Anjana Basu, Joe Winter, Ron. D K Banergjee, Joydeep Bhattacharya, Arun Sarker, Amitabha Mukerjee, Santanu Sinha Chaudhuri, Shamik Bose and Tanmoy Sanyal. A comparison of the translations reflect difference in understanding and interpretation as perceived by the translators. In certain points, interpretation by the translator differs from that of the poet himself, as reflected in his own translation.

There is one instance where all translators, except one, have decidedly diverted from the temporal sense of the text. The first line haajaar bochor dhore aami path haatitechi prithibir pothey is in the present perfect continuous tense. Most translations have rendered this either into simple past tense or present perfect tense. Oblivious of the continuity of the act, Martin Kirkman translated : A thousand years I have wandered upon the earth. Amitabha Mukerjee translated : A thousand years I have walked these paths. Sukanta Chaudhuri rendered : I have walked the roads across the earth's breast for a thousand years. Ananda Lal also used the present perfect tense : I have walked the paths of earth for thousands of years. Now the translation by Joydeep Bhattacharya : I have walked earth's byways for millennia. Fakrul Alam followed suit by writing : For a thousand years I have walked the ways of the world.

On the contrary, Clinton B. Seely used simple past tense : For thousands of years I roamed the paths of this earth. Joe Winter translated : For thousands of years Earth's path has been my path. This is in line with Jibanananda Das himself, who translated like : Long I have been a wanderer of this world. Anjana Basu's translation is not comparable here and hence excluded.

It is Anupam Banerji who maintained the literal sense of the poem (1998) and wrote in translation : For ages I have been walking the paths of this earth. A recent translation by Arun Sarkar again considers the present perfect continuous tense : For thousand years I have been walking all over the world. Recently, a translation by Shamik Bose runs like 'For a thousand years I have been walking upon the bosom of my earth'.

In 2008, Clinton B. Seely improved on his original translation and used the present perfect continuous tense.

== Translation into Hindi ==
Several translations of this poem are available in Hindi. Translations by Prayag Shukla, Sameer Baran Nandi and Nirmal Kumar Chakraborty are notable ones. Almost unknown in literary circles, Sushil Kumar Jha has also attempted to translate Banalata Sen into Hindi, retaining the essence of the poem in its true spirit.
