= Banalata =

Banalata may refer to:

- Banalata Sen, a Bengali-language poem written by Jibanananda Das in 1942
- Banalata Sen (book), a book by Jibanananda Das
