= Dhusar Pandulipi =

Collection of poems written by Jibanananda Das

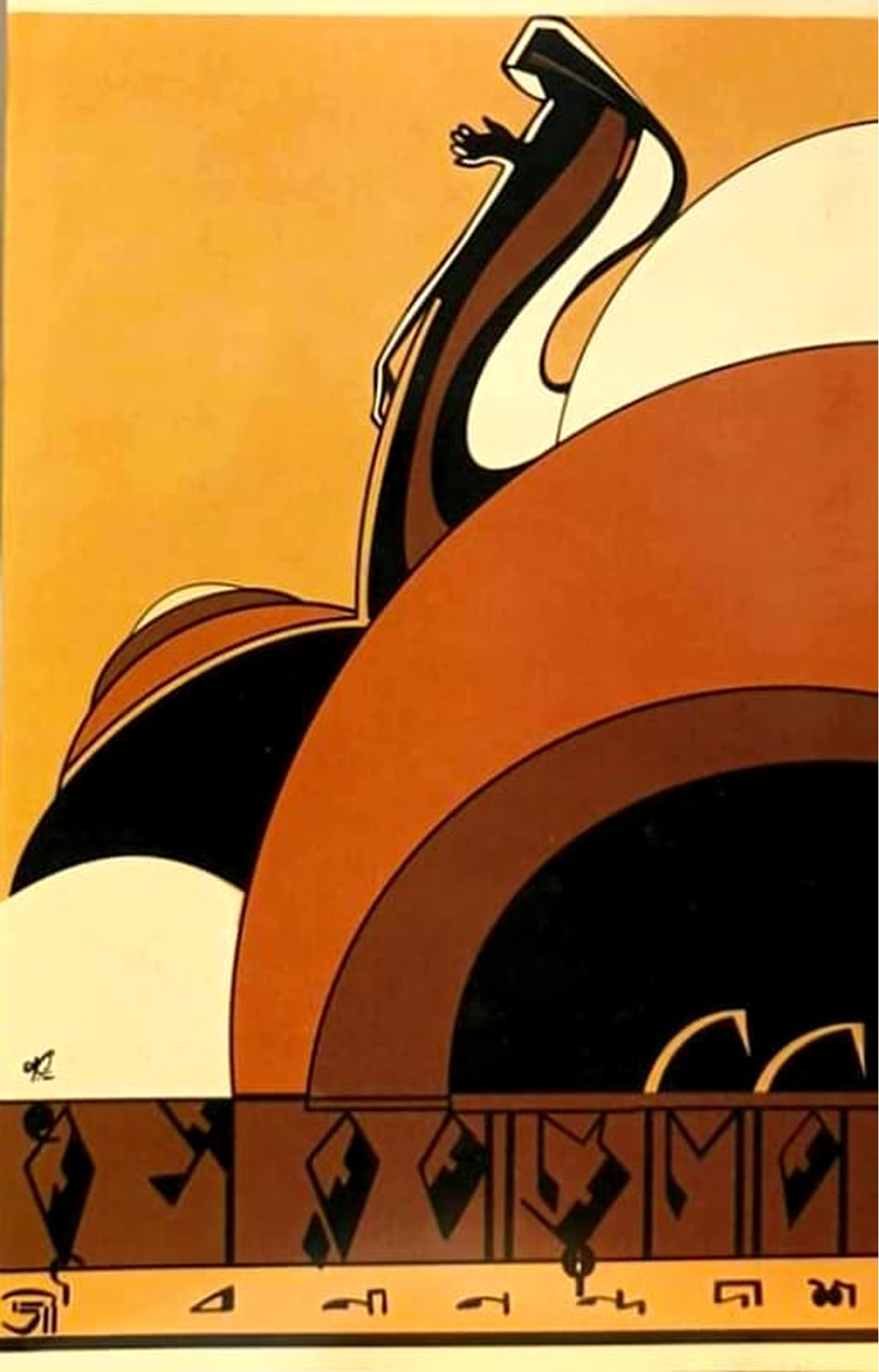
- First Edition of Dhushar Pandulipi (Illustrated by Anil Krishna Bhattacharya and published from the D. M Library)
- Author: Jibanananda Das
- Language: Bengali
- Genre: poetry
- Publication date: 1936
- Publication place: India
- Media type: print
- Text: Dhusar Pandulipi at Wikisource

Dhusar Pandulipi or Dhusor Pandulipi (transl. Grey Manuscript) is a collection of poems by Jibanananda Das. The book was first published in 1936. This poem collection was the first successful attempt in Bengali language, that did not have Tagorian influence.

== Publication ==
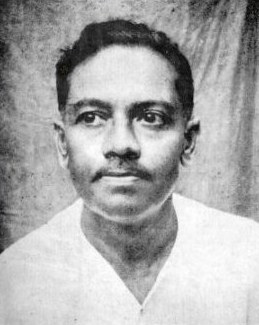
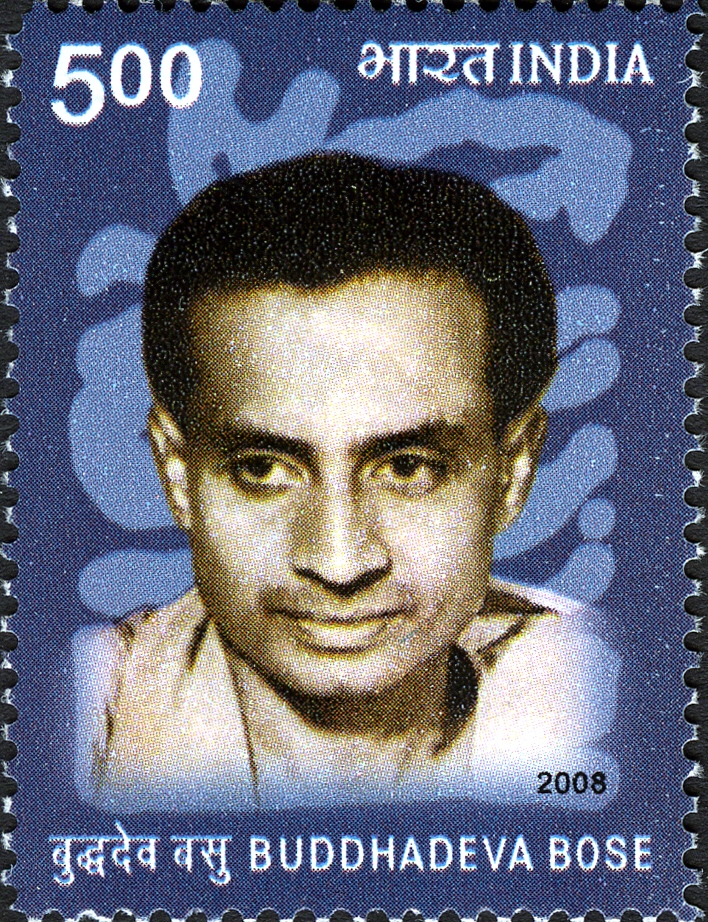
Jibanananda Das (left) first published several poems of the book in Kavita, a magazine edited by Buddhadeb Bosu (right)

The book was first published in 1936, however nearly all the poems of the book were published in different magazines by 1930. Bengali poet Buddhadeb Bosu was associated with poetry magazine Kallol, and also published and edited several notable poetry magazines such as Kavita, Pragati. Many of the post-Tagore literary personalities started their literary career with these poetry journals. Several poems of Jibanananda's Dhusar Pandulipi were first published in Bosu's Kavita magazine. Later Bosu established Kavita Bhavan, a publication and a hang-out for Bengali literary personalities. The first book published by Kavita Bhavan was Jibanananda's Dhusar Pandulipi. Das also dedicated this work to Buddhadeb Bosu.

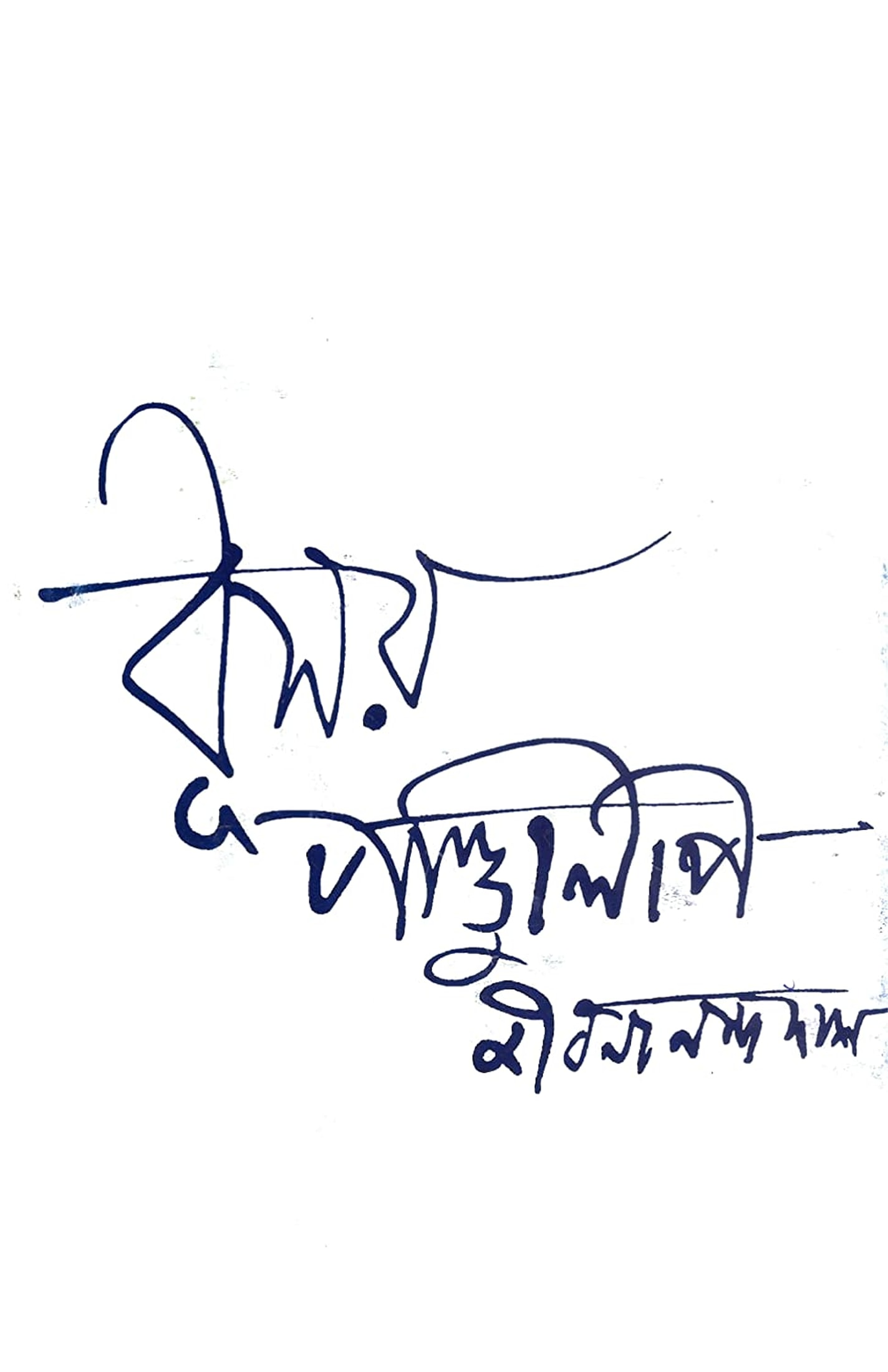
Signet Edition of Dhushar Pandulipi (Illustrated by Satyajit Ray)

Das wrote a poem called "Campe" which was first published in Parichay magazine in 1932. Literary critic Sajanikanta Das accused Jibanananda of obscenity for this poem. However Jibanananda did not pay attention to the criticism and included the poem in the book Dhusar Pandulipi.

== Reception ==
The book is considered as the first matured literary work of Jibanananda Das. Chidananda Dasgupta, in his book Makers Of Indian Literature Jibanananda Das, wrote some of the poems of this collection had a similarity with Rabindranath Tagore's poem "Nirjharer Swapnabhanga". Bengali poet and journalist Samar Sen wrote: ". . . poetic view of poetry will perhaps be irritated with the escape-formula worked out in the last poem of Dhusar Pandulipi, the dream cult and the rest of it.
