= Bodh (poem) =

"Bodh" (Bengali: বোধ, in Clinton B. Seely's English translation "Sensation" and Fakrul Alam's "An Overwhelming Sensation") is a celebrated Bengali poem written by Jibanananda Das in 1930. It was first published in the literary magazine Pragati in 1336 of Bengali calendar. The poem was later included in Jibanananda Das' poetry book Dhushor Pandulipi (The Grey Manuscript) published in 1936. Clinton B. Seely wrote that in "Sensation", Jibanananda gives his readers an account of the burden he bore, the creative process conceived of as a presence, a constant companion, and not always a welcomed one: Prof. Alam opined that the poem is "about a man overwhelmed by the poetic fit and, indeed, consumed by it."

Into the half light and shadow go I. Within my head
Not a dream, but some sensation works its will.
Not a dream, not peace, not love,
A sensation born in my very being.
I cannot escape it
For it puts its hand in mine,
And all else pales to insignificance—futile, so it seems.

== Transliteration of one stanza in the Latin alphabet ==
Transliteration

Sakal loker majhe base;
Nijer ami mudradoshe;
Ami aka hotechi alada;

— 4th stanza
Translation:

Translation

As I take a seat among other beings,
Am I becoming estranged and alone
Because of my mannerisms?
