= Campe (disambiguation) =

Campe is the name of a female monster in Greek mythology.

Campe may also refer to:

- Joachim Heinrich Campe, a German writer, linguist, educator and publisher
- Lawrence Campe, a London merchant
- Campe (poem), a Bengali poem by Jibanananda Das
- Campe, a character in the Canadian Canadian animated television series Class of the Titans
