= Banalata Sen (book) =

Poetry volume by the Bengali poet Jibanananda Das

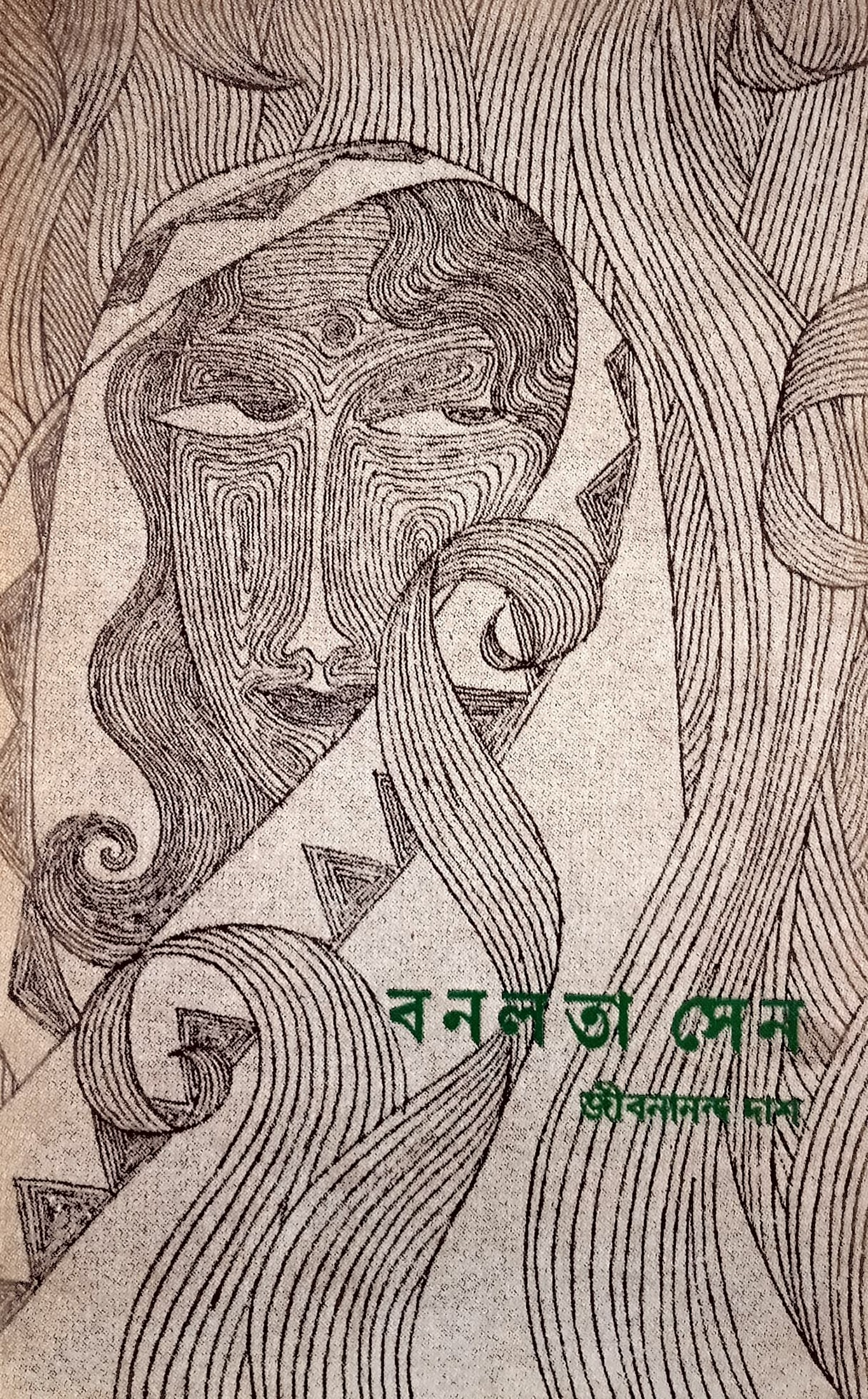
- 1952 cover designed by Satyajit Ray
- Author: Jibanananda Das
- Original title: বনলতা সেন
- Translator: Various
- Cover artist: Satyajit Ray
- Language: Bengali
- Subject: Love, nature, time, loss etc.
- Genre: poetry
- Published: Signet Press (1952)
- Publication place: India
- Pages: 49 (Signet Press 1952 edition), 44 (Calcutta Writers Workshop, 2000. English translation edition)
- ISBN: 9788175957329
- OCLC: 49538244

Banalata Sen (Bengali: বনলতা সেন) is a poetry volume containing 31 poems by the Bengali poet Jibanananda Das (1899–1954). The volume reflects the contextual struggles experienced by the poet in terms of love (his partner, admiration of nature), liberty (World War I, patriotism in the form of admiring the land), and loss (death of loved ones and sense of direction after traumatic contortions) during the Post-Tagore Period. This book has been named "Banalata Sen" after Das's most popular poem, which explored human fulfillment through the personification of a woman. This pattern of progressively exploring human fulfillment through hyperbolising a character is common within this volume.

During Das's lifetime, Banalata Sen was published during Poush 1349 of the Bengali calendar (1942 AD) and in Srabon 1359 of the Bengali calendar (1952 AD). There is a variation in the poems within the volume, as the later version contains poems that were written from 1942 to 1946.

== Composition and publication ==
=== Composition ===
Jibananda Das's composition of Banalata Sen has been influenced by the quintessential poets Rabindranath Tagore and Nazrul Islam as Das intertwines love and nature to explore the critical and complex aspects of life. Although these poets have had a significant influence on Banalata Sen, there is a unique modern style of poetry throughout the 31 poems as Das develops images by turning and molding the images. It is further explored how the elements of nature that are seen as rotten or revolting are incorporated when Das writes Banalata Sen, as he can see the beauty that underlines every aspect of nature. As a result, context is understood as having a significant influence in Das' poetry.

The poems contained in the later version of Banalata Sen (book) have been tied to Das' return to his alma mater throughout 1932 to 1946 after being let go from the Calcutta City College. During that period, Das isolated himself as the controversy he dealt with after publishing Camp'e (At the Camp) in Sudhindranath Dutta's Porichoy magazine influenced him to turn to secrecy.

=== Publication ===
Banalata Sen was the third of seven published poetry volumes during Das' lifetime. This volume is named after Das's most popular poem, which explored human fulfillment through the personification of a woman. This poem is also included in all versions of this poetry volume. Prior to the publication of this volume, it is thought that Das' younger sister Sucharita had access to the poems, as Das would let her read the poems when taking them out of his personal trunk to have them printed.

The volume has been formally published twice during Das' lifetime. The first publication was during Poush, 1942 AD (1349 in the Bengali calendar), in the same year as his father's passing. This publication contained 12 poems, and the cover was illustrated by Sambhu Shaha. The second publication was during Srabon, 1952 AD (1359 in the Bengali calendar) by Signet Press. This version was an enlarged version containing 31 poems, and the cover was illustrated by Satyajit Ray. This is the latest version of the volume.

=== Contents of the volume ===
The latest version of Banalata Sen includes the following poems, and their translated names are:

1. Banalata Sen (a female name)
2. Kuri Bochor Pore (After 20 years)
3. Hawar rat (Windy Night)
4. Ami Jodhi Hotham (If I were to be)
5. Ghas (Grass)
6. Hai Chill (Oh Kite)
7. Buno hans (Wild Duck)
8. Shonkomala
9. Nogno Nirjon Haat
10. Shikhar (The Hunt)
11. Horninera (Deer)
12. Beral (Cat)
13. Shudorshona (Goodlooking)
14. Ondhokar (Darkness)
15. Kamalalebu (An Orange)
16. Shyamoli (a female name)
17. Du-john (Two people)
18. Abosheshe (Finally)
19. Shopner Dhwonira (Musical Dream)
20. Amake Tumi (You for me)
21. Tumi (You)
22. Dhan kata hoi geche (The Harvest is Over)
23. Sheerisher Dalpala (branches of Shirish tree)
24. Hajar Bochor Sudhu Khela Kore (playing for a 1000 years)
25. Suranjana (a female name)
26. Mithvarshon (Sweet rhythm)
27. Sabita (a female name)
28. Shor Chethona
29. Aghran Pranthorey (End of the month of Aghrahayan)
30. Poth Hatha (Walking on the road)
31. Tomake (To you)

== Analysis and interpretation ==
=== Style of poetry ===
As described by Rabindranath Tagore, Das' poetry in this volume have a distinct style of chitrarupmay (Bengali word for imagery), as the progressive element of turning and moulding images allows the reader to immerse themselves in the landscape and time Das is exploring. The transformation of distance into intimacy and the disorderly circumstances into order are imagistic patterns that contribute to Das' distinct modern style of poetry in this volume. According to Joe Winters, Das' distinct style stems from the personification of his surroundings and his use of "register [as he switches] from sophisticated usage[of language] to a village-dialect." As a result, the reader becomes acquainted with the landscape, time, and figures throughout this volume.

=== Contextual influence ===
The major contextual influences of this volume are Das' life in rural Bengal, religion and his individualism. Das' childhood and later years in rural Bengal influenced his ability to explore aspects of people's lives through his exploration and admiration of the environment and living things. As Mary M. Lago suggests, the crowding of elements of country life, such as wild geese, harvesting season, and owls throughout this volume emphasises the significant influence rural life had on Das' composition of Banalata Sen. Das' contextual Hinduism belief system has an impact on this volume, as Tarun Gupta's analysis of the protagonist's journey in Banalata Sen evaluates that the traveler is travelling during "the reign of the Emperor Bimbishar...Ashok ... Vidarbha and Vidisha''.

=== Themes ===
According to Ramona L. Ceciu and The Journal of Asian Studies, the Banalata Sen volume commonly explores the passage of time, love, liberty and loss.

==== Time ====
Das is praised for creating a "universal drama of time" in this volume, in which he explores time through nostalgia and its omnipresence in man's life. According to Ramona L. Ceciu, this volume serves as a "canvas with fluid lines, conceptual associations and contrasts among which the light and shadows of individual histories play hide-and-seek". The contrast of light and shadow creates a passage of time, eliciting a nostalgic response from the reader and encouraging reflection on "history's ever-moving forces". As the interpretation of Das' poetry is subjected to an individual's sense of self and human experiences, the nostalgic response allows Das' poetry to resonate among his audience (of all ages and demographics). In contrast to Ceciu's exploration of the concept of time, Bengali scholar Faizul Latif Chowdhury claims that "Jibananda Das does not pose any conceptual of time...but perhaps questions about [how] time [has] lost their fascination for twentieth century men." In his essay "Temporality in Jibanananda Das' Poetry," he discusses how time is personified as an omnipresent observer in Das' later poems, as the poet "observes that Time continues to be awake when everyone's waking comes to an end...essentially [viewing] Time as god;albeit a non-religious god." As a result, Chowdhury declares that Das' "preoccupation with time is essentially one about human existence," which is understandable given his varying perspectives on the concept of time throughout this volume.

==== Love ====
Das' admiration for nature and the symbol of feminine mystery explores the conceptual theme of love in this volume.

===== Love for nature (flora and fauna) =====
Das is described throughout this volume by Jebun Ara Geeti as loving "the things of nature sensuously" because his entire being is "immersed by nature." As a result, he incorporates the environment and living things from his childhood and later years in rural Bengal to explore the love and admiration he has for the flora and fauna in Bangladesh. Ceciu raises this point in regard to Das's context and key features as animals, plants and the ocean are commonly referred to in this volume of poetry. He specifically refers to "owls, rats and cats'', which are not perceived to be the defining animals of the beauty of nature. Thus, it goes to show how much love he has for nature by shaping ordinary/unlikable animals as a representation of our need for love and understanding.

===== Romantic/spiritual love =====
Sauruv Sengupta investigates how romantic and spiritual love is communicated through his reference to the "eyes and breast," as they are metaphorical allusions to the vision and compassion that are essential in one's experience of love. Ceciu connects these essential elements of vision and compassion to Das's emblem of feminine mystery by characterising women as a destination by "alluding to different mythological and ancient persons, places and events". This characterisation is applied to women as a result of the narrator having "soothing moments" when near these women. This is emphasised by Papri Sengupta, who highlights a transition to women being referenced with emotion in poems such as Banalata Sen and Shemolee, where the narrator seeks comfort by sitting "face-to-face" with these women to "share his stories" at the end of the day when "days end evening crawls in like the sound of dews." Conversely, it is also highlighted that these female figures may be a representation of the spiritual comfort of a specific location. However, it has not been confirmed whether these women are real or figments of Das' imagination, as scholars have interpreted this volumes differently. Some have used Das' contextual influences to interpret his description/definition of love, while others have taken a subjective point of view.

==== Loss (sense of direction after traumatic contortions) ====
The theme of loss is explored through Das' admiration for animals' sense of direction, as he refers to the unique abilities of the "owl" and "eagle" in terms of their sense of direction. Sauruv Sengupta interprets this as Das' admiration for how animals can "manoeuvre through a maze of traumatic contortions." This is further emphasised by Das' use of the word "yet," which "serves as a bridge between his agony over the state of mankind at the moment and his firm faith in the ultimate freedom he obtains from it."

== Legacy ==
Banalata Sen has had a profound impact upon the poetry world as it guided the path for modern poets. This is because Das' style of chitrarupmay (Bengali word for imagery) and the element of turning and moulding images have been adopted by poets and artists like Sanatan Dinda.

=== Appropriation and adaptations ===
Composers have set this volume of poetry to music, and Bengali directors have sourced their film plotline from these poems. A variety of adaptations/appropriations are listed below:

- Bengali short film, "Banalata Sen" by Box Office Creation.
- Sanatan Dinda's painting "Kallolini Tilottoma"(adaptation)
- Sanatan Dinda's painting "Banalata"(adaptation) Ramona L. CECIU highlights that "the photographic paintings of Dinda is the depth of vision, combined with an elegance of lines, a rendition of the poetry of the city woven in the poetry of womanhood, along with multiple cultural symbols (e.g. flower garland, peacock feather, etc.)"
- Arpita Singh's painting "Banalata Sen" (adaptation) With reference to Mikhail Bakhtin's essays in "Art and Answerability" Ramona L. CECIU highlights that Arpita Singh's painting "Banalata Sen" is "an example of answerability and authorship as an exegesis puts Jibanananda's text into a new embodiment and draws upon a notion of multiple narratives within a single visual text."
- Soumitra Chatterjee's video recitation of poems from the Banalata Sen series titled "Banalata Sen".(recitation)

== Awards ==
- Signet Press's enlarged edition of Banalata Sen won an award at the Nikhil Banga Rabindra Sahitya Sammelan.
