= Jyotirmoy Datta =

Indian Bengali writer (1936–2025)

- Born: 1936; Bengal Presidency, British India
- Died: 28 December 2025 (aged 88–89); Kolkata, West Bengal, India
- Occupation: Journalist

Jyotirmoy Datta (Bengali: জ্যোতির্ময় দত্ত, jotirmôe dôtto; 1936 – 28 December 2025) was an Indian Bengali writer, journalist, poet, and an essayist. He worked for The Statesman, Calcutta's oldest English-language daily, as feature writer, film critic, correspondent, and associate editor. He visited the University of Chicago as a lecturer, 1966–1968, and also did a residency at the University of Iowa. He has published 2 books of verse, several novels and collections of essays and short stories.

Datta lived his last years in Hillsborough Township, New Jersey, near New York City, where he worked as an Editor for South Asia Journal. He attended many poetry readings in Manhattan and Queens and was a famous figure among the Indians and New York poets.

== Background ==
Datta was born in West Bengal in 1936, but grew up in various places in India, mostly South India. He had nine siblings in all. Datta was brought up in forest areas and was 11 when India gained independence from the British. His wife, Minakshi Datta, is the past President of "Tagore Society of New York". Minakshi Datta is the daughter of another important figure in Bengali poetry, Buddhadev Bose. Her mother was the singer and writer, Protibha Bose, many of whose novels have been bestsellers and have been made into hit movies.

He was the father of two children. His daughter, Kankawati Datta, has written a few books and is the editor of "Personae" magazine. His son, Mallinath Datta, is an executive at a large advertising agency and also an independent film director who directed the film Full Masti.

Jyotirmoy Datta died on 28 December 2025.

== Controversies ==
Datta was in conflict with Indian Prime Minister Indira Gandhi in the late 1970s. He wrote a story critical of her in his magazine Kolkata. His family was watched by the Indian government in this time period. He had to become a fugitive for more than two years and once jumped from a three-story house to escape from the police. His ankle was badly injured because of this event. He was finally captured by the police and was imprisoned at the Presidency Jail in Calcutta. However, six months into his imprisonment, the elections were held and he was released. Indira Gandhi was defeated and all charges against him were dropped.

After coming back to freedom in triumph, Datta went on an expedition on a sailing boat from Calcutta to Sri Lanka.

Datta, along with Sunil Gangopadhyay, Tarun Sanyal and Satrajit Datta were defense witnesses in the trial of Hungryalist poet Malay Roy Choudhury, which shows his greatness, since he did not agree with the Hungryalist school of poetry.

He was involved in a dispute with professor P. Lal.

== Impact ==
Clinton B. Seely wrote his thesis after meeting Datta and being inspired by his work.
