= Signet Press =

Indian publishing house in West Bengal

- Parent company: Ananda Publishers
- Founded: 1943; 82 years ago
- Founder: D. K. Gupta
- Country of origin: India
- Headquarters location: College Street, (in front of Sanskrit College), Kolkata, West Bengal
- Publication types: Books

Signet Press is a publishing house in Kolkata, West Bengal, India, founded in 1943 by Dilip Kumar Gupta (known as D.K.) and his mother-in-law, Neelima Guha Thakurtha.

== History ==
Signet Press has published books by various authors, including Jawaharlal Nehru's Discovery of India, Bibhutibhushan Bandopadhyay's Pather Panchali and Chander Pahar, and Jibanananda Das's Rupasi Bangla and Banalata Sen. The film director Satyajit Ray started working as a visual designer for Signet Press in 1943 where he designed many book covers.

After D.K. Gupta's illness and death in the late 1970s, Signet Press temporarily ceased operations. It was later revived when acquired by Ananda Publishers.

== Historical significance ==
In Boiyer Ghor, writer Shankha Ghosh discussed Signet Press, its location, and its poetry publications:

"Then came the store of Signet press. That is, it came to College Street. Even in the forties, many books were published from Signet, with its consistent elegance in selection and printing. But with the opening of its new store on Bankim Chatterjee Street, we no longer had to wander from place to place looking for books of poetry, be it Jibanananda Das or Sudhindranath Dutta. Dilip Kumar Gupta's diligent work on the neatness of printing (everyone knows him as DK), Satyajit Ray's excellent aesthetic taste illustrating its covers, and the writings of modern poets - all these combined to create a desirable environment for all of us. In the years fifty-two and fifty-three, when we were twenty-one years of age, we saw the publication of new books from Signet, appearing one after the other; 'Banalata Sen', 'Sanvarta', 'Parapar', 'Naam rekhechi Komal Gandhar', 'Amavasya!'. Then came the new edition of 'Orchestra' with a brand new, changed, introduction of which we began to return to our mouths: ‘I am rooted in darkness, rising towards the light’. ‘Samar Sen’s Poems’. The new versions of 'Swagata' and 'Kulaya O Kalpurush' to be released from Signet in their new attire were still a few years away. It is safe to say that Signet also emboldened modern poetry. They also started publishing books by young poets like Naresh Guha and Nirendranath Chakravarti. Besides, new versions of 'Prothoma' and 'Samrat', or 'Winter Prayer: Answer to Spring' appeared in different houses. We no longer had any difficulty finding poetry books. Signet's presence was widespread, promoting the message of 'read poetry, read poetry'. They even had many new ideas to attract aspiring minds from many directions, like including a small, lovely gift slip with a book."

— Shankha Ghosh, Boiyer Ghor
