= Rajeshwari Dutta =

Rajeshwari Dutta ਰਾਜੇਸ਼ਵਰੀ ਵਾਸੁਦੇਵ
- Born: Rajeshwari Vasudev; 17 April 1918; Lahore, Punjab Province, British India
- Died: 10 April 1976 (Age 57) Calcutta, West Bengal, India
- Genres: Rabindra Sangeet
- Occupations: Vocalist, exponents
- Spouse: Sudhindranath Dutta (m.1943; died 1960)

Rajeshwari Dutta born as Rajeshwari Vasudev (17 July 1918 - 10 April 1976) was an Indian singer, considered one of the best-known exponents of the songs of Rabindranath Tagore.

She was amongst the few singers to earn appreciation from Rabindranath Tagore. She was among the singers of Rabindrasangeet, a group of the earliest singers of Tagore songs from families directly connected to Tagore and including Sahana Devi, Amiya Tagore, and Malati Ghoshal. Rajeshwari Vasudev was married to noted poet Sudhindranath Datta after she received her musical training at Santiniketan. She was affiliated with music institutions in UK and the US in 1960s. The rich classical base of her voice flowed seamlessly in Tagore songs and was particularly effective in portraying the moods.

Among her early recordings, the best ones are Ogo shono ke bajay and Aji tomay abar chai shunabare. Her recordings were made starting 1938 by Hindusthan Musical Products company of Calcutta, which emerged along with two others in 1932 out of the spirit of nationalism to compete with His Master's Voice. All through her life, recordings were made exclusively by this company.
