= Jibanananda Das =

Bengali poet of the modern period

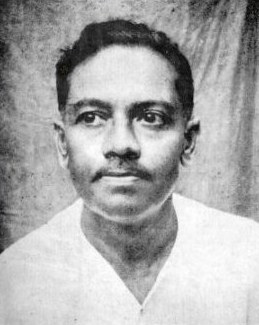
- Jibanananda Das
- Pronunciation: [ˈd͡ʒibonanond̪o ˈd̪aʃ]
- Born: Jibanananda Das; 17 February 1899; Barisal, Backergunge, Bengal Presidency, British Raj (now Barishal, Bangladesh)
- Died: 22 October 1954 (aged 55); Calcutta, West Bengal, India
- Education: Brajamohan College; University of Calcutta
- Occupations: poet; writer; professor
- Spouse: Labanyaprabha Das (m. 1930)
- Children: 2
- Relatives: Kusumkumari Das (mother)
- Writing career
- Language: Bengali
- Genres: Poetry, novels, short stories, criticism
- Notable works: Banalata Sen, Rupasi Bangla, Akashlina, Banalata Sen, Campe, Bodh
- Notable awards: Nikhil Banga Rabindra Sahitya Sammelan Award (1952); Sahitya Akademi Award (1955)
- Movement: Bengali Modernism

Jibanananda Das (Note: pronounced [ˈd͡ʒibonanond̪o ˈd̪aʃ].) (Bengali: [ˈd͡ʒibonanond̪o ˈd̪aʃ]; 17 February 1899 – 22 October 1954) was a Bengali poet, writer, and educationist widely regarded as one of the major figures of twentieth-century Bengali modernist poetry. Often called Rupashi Banglar Kabi (“Poet of Beautiful Bengal”), he received limited recognition during his lifetime but later came to be considered one of the most important and influential figures in Bengali literature after Rabindranath Tagore and Kazi Nazrul Islam.

Born in Barisal, Bengal Presidency, Das studied English literature at Presidency College and University of Calcutta. He worked mainly as a teacher of English at several colleges, while also writing poetry, essays and fiction. His first poem appeared in print in 1919, and his first poetry collection, Jhara Palok, was published in 1927.

Das's verse explores a world of surrealism, depression, and melancholia. His work often combines nature, time, death, desire and urban alienation through dense metaphor and surreal suggestion. His major works include Jhara Palok, Dhusar Pandulipi, Banalata Sen, Mahaprithibi, Shreshtha Kavita and the posthumously published Rupasi Bangla; among them, the poem “Banalata Sen” and the poetry collection Rupasi Bangla remain his most discussed and celebrated works.

In 1954, Das was hit by a tram in Kolkata while crossing on a road, and was taken to a hospital, where he died eight days later. Das received the Rabindra-Memorial Award for Banalata Sen in 1953. His collection Shrestha Kavita was posthumously awarded the Sahitya Akademi Award in 1955. His life and works have since become major subjects of literary criticism, academic research, translation, documentary work, music and film adaptation in both Bangladesh and India.

== Early life ==
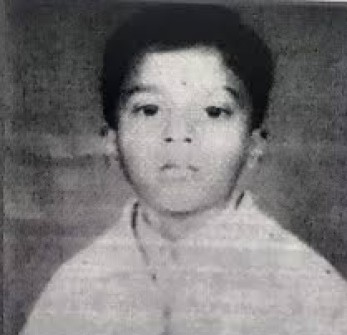
Das in his childhood

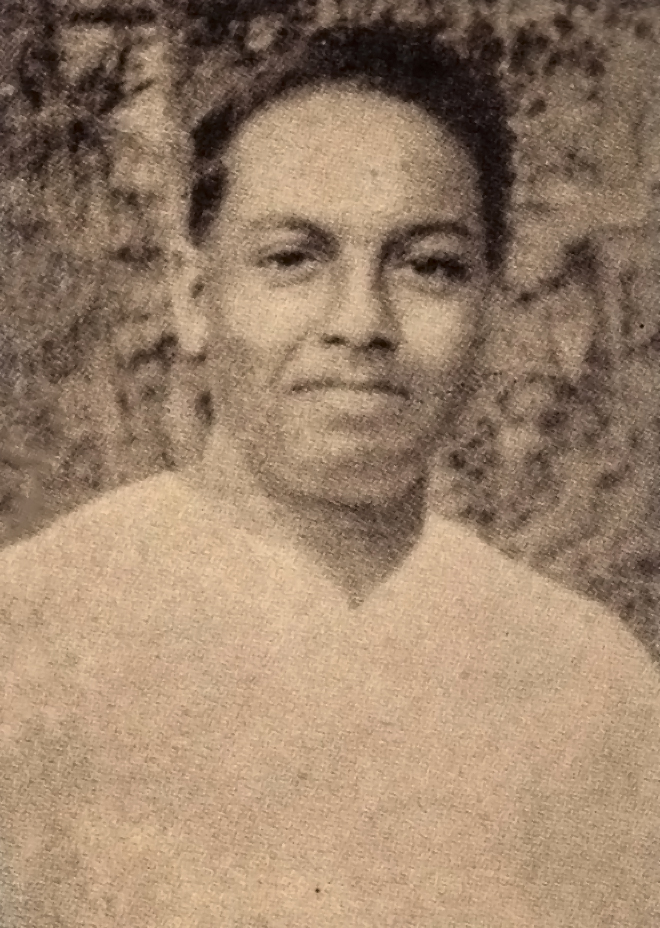
Young Jibanananda Das

Jibanananda Das was born in 1899 in Barisal, a district town in the British Raj (now Barisal, Bangladesh), into a Bengali Baidya family. His father, Satyananda Das, was a schoolmaster and publisher, and his mother, Kusumkumari Das, was a poet who explored social issues. Das was called by the nickname Milu by his parents. He was the eldest son and had two siblings, Ashokananda Das and Sucharita Das.

=== Ancestry ===
Das' ancestors originated from the Bikrampur region (now Mushiganj, Dhaka, Bangladesh) from the now-extinct village of Gaupara in the Kumarvog area of the Louhajang Upazila on the banks of the river Padma. Das' grandfather Sarbānanda Dāśgupta was the first to settle permanently in Barisal. He was an early exponent of the reformist Brahmo Samaj movement in Barisal and was highly regarded in town for his philanthropy. He erased the -gupta suffix from the family name, regarding it as a symbol of Vedic Brahmin excess, thus rendering the surname to Das.

== Education and career ==
Jibanananda attended Brajamohon College in Barisal, where he passed both his Matriculation and Intermediate exams with a first division in 1915 and 1917 respectively. In 1919, he received a BA Degree in English literature from Presidency College, Kolkata and earned a master's degree from Calcutta University in 1921.

Following his graduation, Das taught and tutored students in English, but he experienced persistent difficulty in securing stable employment and faced financial hardship throughout his life. In 1922, Jibanananda Das joined City College as a lecturer and continued there until 1928, when he lost his position at the institution.^{:P20}

=== Literary career ===
As a child, Das developed a strong passion for reading books beyond his school curriculum. He had access to his father's personal library at home, and both of his parents were writers. Growing up in a literary environment, Das began writing poetry at an early age, although none of his poems from that period have survived.^{:P14-15}

While working as a teacher at City College, Das occasionally wrote poems, sometimes under pseudonyms, for various Bengali magazines including Bangabani, Kallol, Kalikalam, and Progoti. His first poem called "Borsho-abahon" (Arrival of the New Year) appeared anonymously in the Boishakh issue of Brahmobadi journal in 1919. He published his first collection of poems called Jhara Palok (Fallen Feathers) in 1927. In 1935, Das wrote Mrittu'r Aagey (“Before Death”). This was followed by his most celebrated poem Banalata Sen, both of which were published in the first two issues of the newly launched poetry magazine Kobita. In 1942, the poem Banalata Sen was included in Das’s third poetry collection of the same name. After the partition of Bengal in 1947, Das left Barisal for Kolkata, where he became the editor of a newly published literary magazine named Dwandwo (Conflict). By the last year of his life, Jibanananda was acclaimed as one of the best poets of the post-Tagore era. In May 1954, he published a volume titled Sreshttho Kobita (Best Poems), which won the Indian Sahitya Akademi Award in 1955. His sonnet cycle Rupasi Bangla was published posthumously in 1957.

== Personal life ==
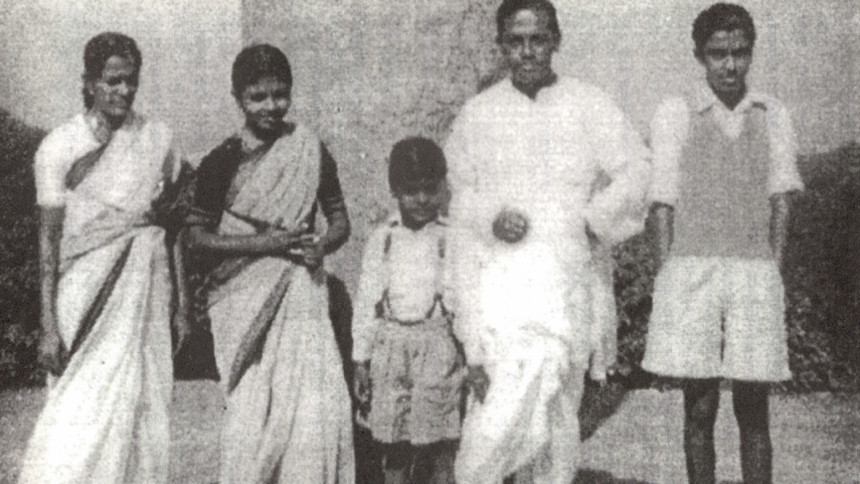
Das with his family

In May 1930, Jibanananda married Labanyaprabha Das (née Gupta) and they had a daughter and son named Manjusree and Samarananda. Labanyaprabha was the daughter of Rohini Kumar Gupta and Sarojubala Gupta. Her paternal uncle was Acharya of the Brahmo Samaj in Dhaka.

=== Death ===
During Jibanananda's evening walk on 14 October 1954, he was struck by a tram while crossing a road near Calcutta's Deshapriya Park. He was taken to Shambhunath Pundit Hospital, where he died eight days later. Witnesses had later reported that the tram had sounded its whistle, but Das did not stop and was hit. Some accounts have speculated that the incident may have been a suicide.

His body was cremated the following day at Keoratola crematorium.

== Writing style ==
Jibananda Das was one of the five leading figures of modern Bengali poetry, collectively known as the Pancha Pandab of the Kallol era. Alongside Sudhindranath Dutta, Bishnu Dey, Amiya Chakravarty, and Buddhadeva Bose, he played a pivotal role in introducing literary modernism in twentieth-century Bengali poetry. His early poetry reflected the influence of his contemporary poets including Kazi Nazrul Islam, Satyendranath Dutta, and Mohitlal Majumdar but by the later half of the 20th century, his own work had become a major influence on the development of modern Bengali verse.

Das’s poetry is marked by sensuousness, mysteriousness, the macabre, symbolism, the aesthetics of synaesthesia and imagism, and a profound sense of melancholy. He was known as a surrealist poet for his spontaneous, frenzied overflow of subconscious mind in poetry and especially in diction.

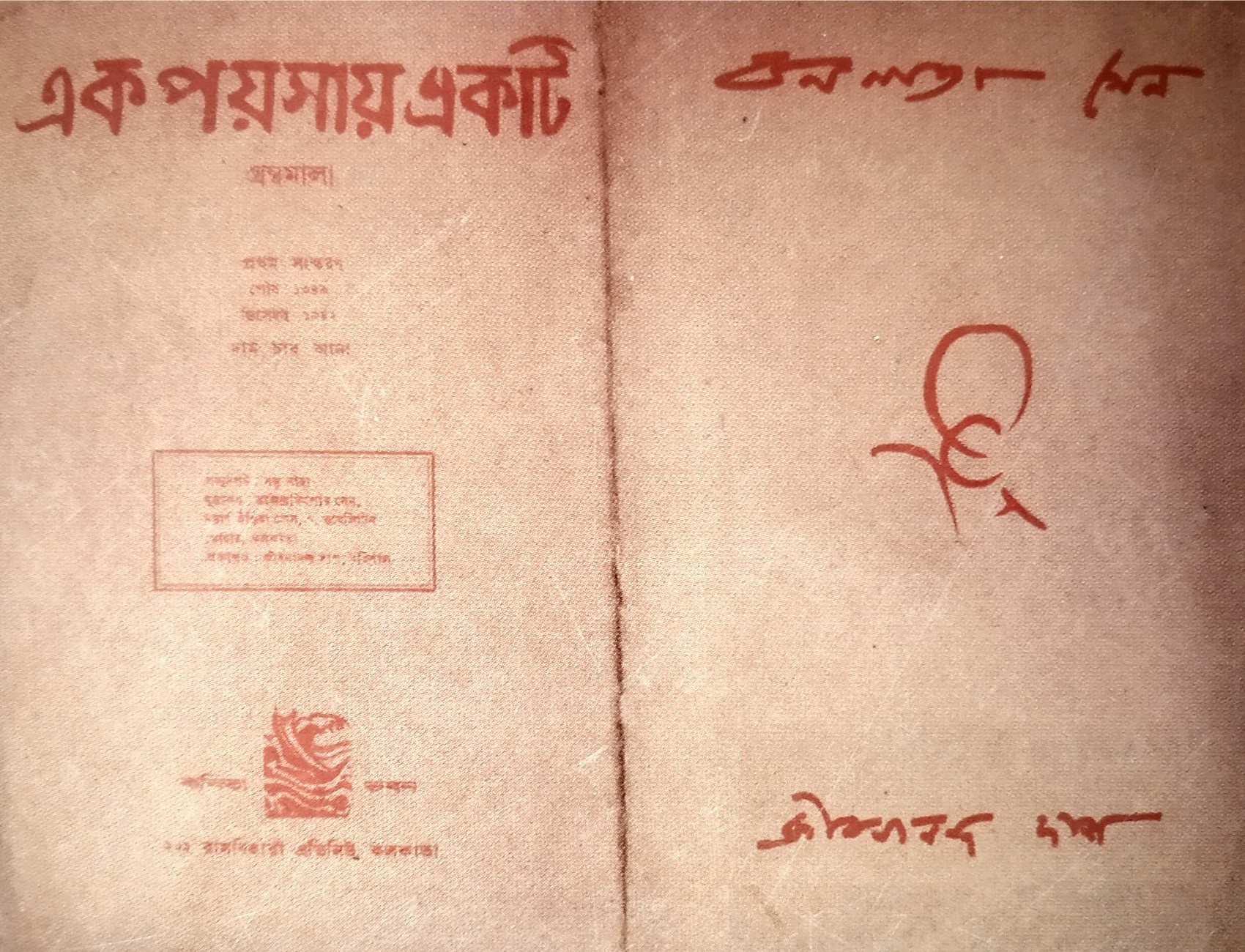
First Edition of Banalata Sen published from Kavita Bhavan of Buddhadev Bose

=== Depiction of nature ===
The nature of the rural bengal is one of the central elements of Jibanananda Das’s poetic style. His poems frequently refer to rivers, fields, birds, trees, moonlight, fog, and seasonal change. His work often uses natural imagery to express memory, solitude, time, decay, and a sense of historical loss.

In collections such as Rupasi Bangla and Dhusar Pandulipi, nature appears as both a physical environment and an imaginative space. Literary critics have observed that his portrayal of Bengal’s landscape differs from earlier romantic depictions of nature in Bengali poetry. His natural world is often quiet, sensuous, melancholic, and closely connected with human consciousness.

In Das’s poetry, the rivers of Bengal, such as the Padma, Meghna, Jamuna, and Dhaleshwari symbolize life, memory, and the flow of time rather than merely serving as natural features. Through rivers, fields, and green landscapes, he creates a dreamlike image of Bengal.

== Legacy ==
During his lifetime, Das published only 269 poems in different journals and magazines, of which 162 were collected in seven anthologies, from Jhara Palak to Bela Obela Kalbela. After his death, it was discovered that, in addition to poetry, Das had written 21 novels and 108 short stories.

Many of his poems have been published posthumously at the initiative of his brother Asokananda Das, sister Sucharita Das and nephew Amitananda Das, and the efforts of Dr. Bhumendra Guha, who over the decades copied them from scattered manuscripts. By 2008, the total count of Jibananda's known poems stood at almost 800. In addition, numerous novels and short stories were discovered and published about the same time.

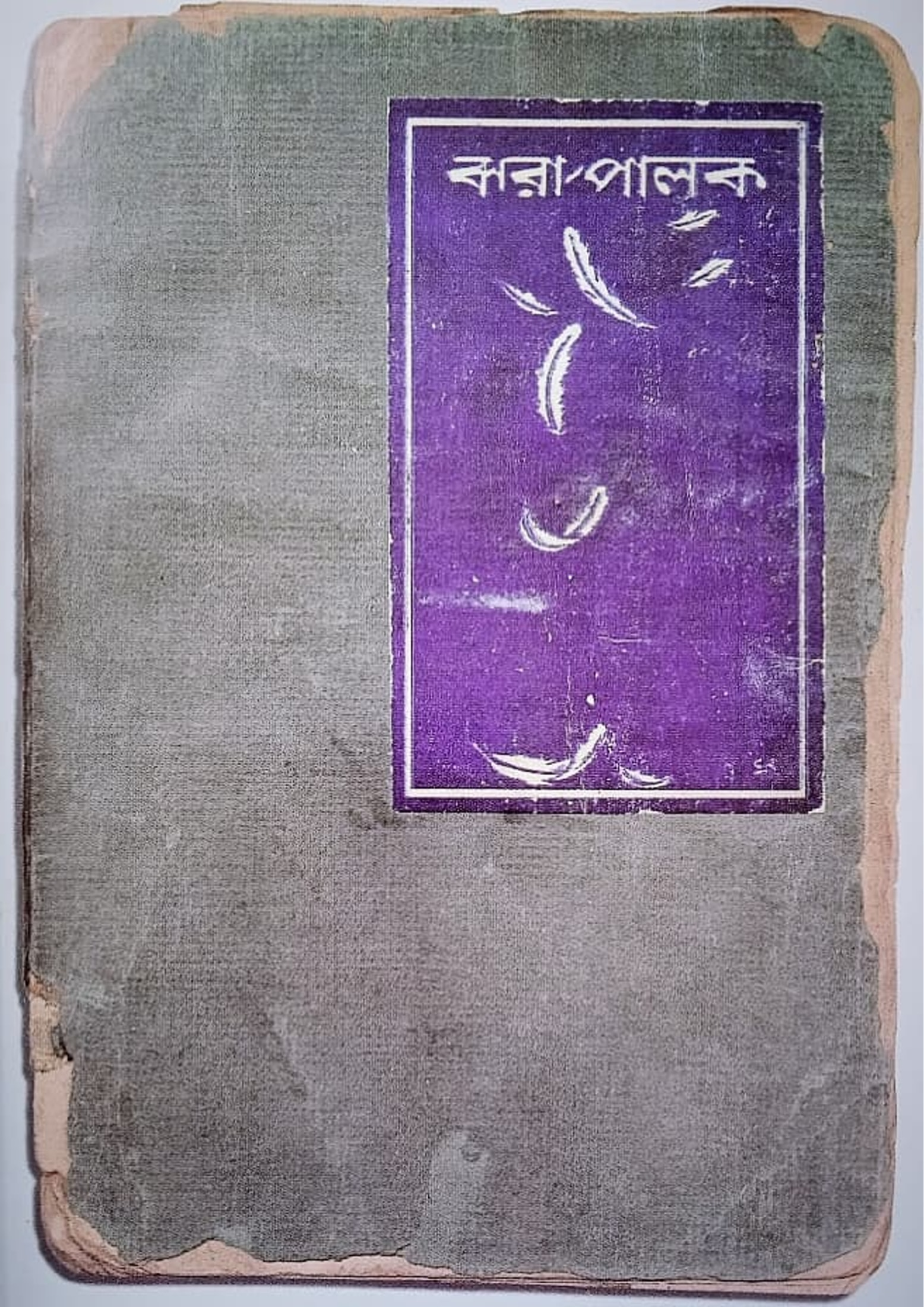
Jibananda's first book 'Jhara Palak'

Jibanananda scholar Clinton B. Seely has termed Jibanananda Das as "Bengal's most cherished poet since Rabindranath Tagore".

A film inspired by his short story Jamrultola, titled 'Sunder Jibon', directed by Sandeep Chattopadhyay and produced by Satyajit Ray Film and Television Institute; won the National Film Award for Best Short Fiction Film at the 50th National Film Awards, with Shantanu Bose in the lead role.

=== Awards in his honour ===
The Kolkata Poetry Confluence, in collaboration with Bhasha Samsad, has instituted the Jibanananda Das Award for poetry translation. Jibanananda Das awards for translation were given away in ten different languages.

A literary award named Jibanananda Puroshkar, also known as the Jibanananda Prize, has been instituted in Bangladesh. It confers annual awards to the best works of poetry and prose by Bangladeshi authors.

In 2025, the interim government of Bangladesh officially renamed the cricket stadium in Barisal to Kabi Jibanananda Das Stadium, after the prominent Bengali poet, who was born & spent much of his life in Barisal. The renaming was done in recognition of his extensive contributions to Bengali literature.

== Major works ==
=== Poetry ===
- Jhôra Palok (Fallen Feathers), 1927.
- Dhusar Pandulipi (Grey Manuscript), 1936.
- Banalata Sen, 1942.
- Môhaprithibi (Great Universe), 1944.
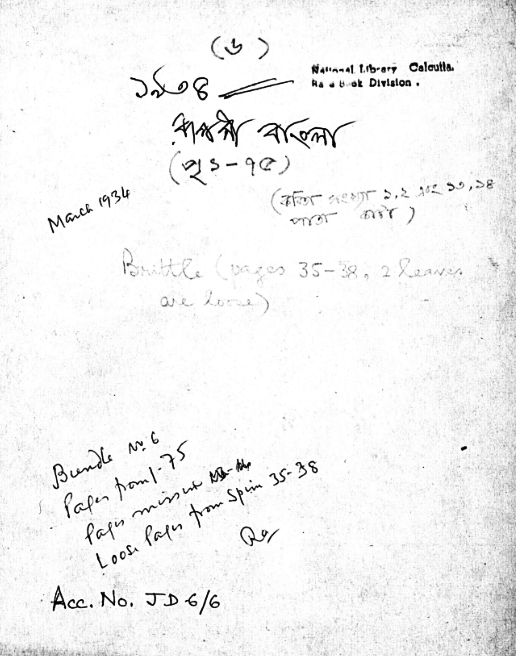
- First page of the manuscript of Rupashi Bangla by Jibanananda Das
  Shaat-ti Tarar Timir, (Darkness of Seven Stars), 1948.
- Shreshtho Kobita, (Best Poems), 1954: Navana, Calcutta.
- Ruposhi Bangla (Bengal, the Beautiful), written in 1934, published posthumously in 1957.
- Bela Obela Kalbela (Times, Bad Times, End Times), 1961, published posthumously but the manuscript was prepared during lifetime.
- Sudorshona(The beautiful), published posthumously in 1973: Sahitya Sadan, Calcutta.
- Alo Prithibi (The World of Light), published posthumously in 1981: Granthalaya Private Ltd., Calcutta.
- Manobihangam (The Bird that is my Heart), published posthumously in 1979: Bengal Publishers Private Ltd. Calcutta.
- Oprkashitô Ekanno (Unpublished Fifty-one), published posthumously in 1999, Mawla Brothers, Dhaka.
- Krishna Dasami, Pathak Samabesh, Dhaka. published posthumously in 2015.
- Surya Osuryaloke, Suchoyoni, Dhaka. published posthumously in 2021.

== Major collected texts ==
- Bandopdhaya, Deviprasad : Kabya Songroho − Jibanananda Das (tr. Collection of Poetry of Jibanananda Das), 1993, Bharbi, 13/1 Bankim Chatterjje Street, Kolkata-73.
- Bandopdhaya, Deviprasad : Kabya Songroho − Jibanananda Das (tr. Collection of Poetry of Jibanananda Das), 1999, Gatidhara, 38/2-KA Bangla Bazaar, Dhaka-1100, Bangladesh.
- Bandopdhaya, Deviprasad : Jibanananda Das Uttorparba (1954–1965), 2000, Pustak Bipani, Calcutta.
- Chowdhury, Faizul Latif (editor) (1990), Jibanananda Das'er Prôbôndha Sômôgrô, (tr: Complete non-fictional prose works of Jibanananda Das), First edition : Desh Prokashon, Dhaka.
- Chowdhury, Faizul Latif (editor) (1995), Jibanananda Das'er Prôbôndha Sômôgrô, (tr: Complete non-fictional prose works of Jibanananda Das), Second edition : Mowla Brothers, Dhaka.
- Chowdhury, F. L. (ed) : Oprokashito 51 (tr. Unpublished fifty one poems of Jibanananda Das), 1999, Mawla Brothers, Dhaka.
- Shahriar, Abu Hasan : Jibanananda Das-er Gronthito-Ogronthito Kabita Samagra, 2004, Agaami Prokashoni, Dhaka.
