= Kusumkumari Das =

Poet

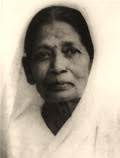
- Pronunciation: [kuʃumkumaɾi d̪aʃ]
- Born: 1875; Bakerganj, Bengal, British India
- Died: 1948 (aged 72–73); Calcutta, West Bengal, India
- Spouse: Satyananda Das
- Children: 3, including Jibanananda Das

Kusumkumari Das (Note: Bengali pronunciation: [kuʃumkumaɾi d̪aʃ].) (Bengali pronunciation: [kuʃumkumaɾi d̪aʃ]; 1875–1948) was a Bengali poet, writer and social activist. She is known as a poet and the mother of Jibanananda Das, the eminent poet of modern Bengali literature and also served as the secretary of Barisal Women Society.

== Biography ==
She was educated at Calcutta Bethune School. At the age of 19, she was married to Satyananda Das in 1894 and bore him two sons (Jibanananda Das and Ashokananda Das) and a daughter (Sucharita Das).

She inherited the habit of writing from her father, Chandranath Das. Her father used to write light verses. She published poems in several magazines, among them were Mukul, Brahmabadi and Pravasii. She used to keep journals regularly. But most of them could not found because they were either lost or damaged by herself. Her famous poem is "Adarsha Chele", in English, "the Exemplary Boy" or "the Ideal Boy". The first two lines of this poem gained legendary status:

Amader Deshe Hobe Shei Chele Kobe,
Kothai Na Boro Hoye, Kaje Boro Hobe ...

Translation:

When within our country will that boy be born
Who not by words but by deeds grow big and strong!

আমাদের দেশে হবে সেই ছেলে কবে
কথায় না বড় হয়ে কাজে বড় হবে?
মুখে হাসি বুকে বল, তেজে ভরা মন
“মানুষ হইতে হবে” এই যার পণ !!

Apart from housekeeping and writing, Kusumkumari Das had active participation in social activities. As a female member of Brahmo society, she pioneered women's participation in social activities in Barisal. From 1319 to 1338 of Bengali calendar she acts as an Acharya in Women's day prayer. Even she sometimes acts as an Acharya in general assembly of Brahsomaj too.

She was the secretary of Barisal Mohila Sabha (Barisal Women Society). This society worked to help poor girls, to train midwives, to found girls school, to facilitate indoor education for women etc.

== Publications ==
- Kavyamukul
- Pouranik Akhyayika
- Kusumkumari Daser Kabita
- Dainandin Dinlipi
