= Minakshi Datta =

Bengali educator, writer and actor (born 1935)

- Datta in 2018
- Born: 1 October 1935 (age 91); Calcutta, Bengal Presidency, British India
- Education: Presidency College; University of Calcutta
- Occupations: Educationist, writer, actor, translator and anthologist
- Spouse: Jyotirmoy Datta
- Children: 2
- Parent(s): Buddhadeb Bosu and Pratibha Basu

Minakshi Datta (Bengali: মীনাক্ষী দত্ত) is a Bengali educationist, writer, actor, translator and anthologist. An educator all her life, she is a widely recognized influence in the Kolkata and the New York literary and cultural circles.

Married to fellow Bengali writer Jyotirmoy Datta, she is the mother of two children, Mallinath Datta, who was an IT professional, dramatist and filmmaker, and Kankabati Datta, who is an editor and a writer. Minakshi and Jyotirmoy Datta divide their time between Kolkata, India, and Cherry Hill, New Jersey, USA.

== Biography ==
Minakshi Datta was born on 1 October 1935 in Kolkata to eminent parents. Her father was Buddhadeb Bosu, one of the most important Bengali literary figures after Rabindranath Tagore. Her mother was the celebrated novelist and singer Pratibha Basu, many of whose novels have been bestsellers and have been made into successful movies.

Minakshi Datta grew up in what was then the cradle of modernism in Bengal, ‘Kavita Bhavan’ at 202 Rashbehari Avenue, Kolkata. She graduated from Presidency College, Kolkata, and did her master's degree at the University of Calcutta. Since then, her active participations in various streams of literature have continued in parallel with her professional life as an educator, spanning two countries - India and the USA.

== Literary activities ==
Minakshi Datta has authored fifteen books. This includes an anthology of Western love stories, titled Bideshini (Bengali for "woman of other lands"), published in 1960. This book has been reprinted multiple times. It introduced several Western masters of romantic fiction to the Bengali readers. Her three-volume authoritative anthology of the Best of Kavita (poetry magazine edited by her father Buddhadeb Bosu) is regarded by many as the best introduction to modern Bengali poetry.

Her memoir of some of the literary figures that she knew in her youth and childhood, Album theke koyekjon (Bengali for "profiles from my album") brings to life one of the most colorful periods of Bengali literature. She is a featured writer of a column on the Sunday edition of a leading daily Kolkata newspaper Aajkaal.
Datta's autobiographical sketches of Kavita Bhavan, Buddhodeb Bosu O Tanr Sarorswat Goshthi (Bengali for "Buddhadeva Bose and his Literary Circle") and Smritite Chithite Buddhodeb Bosu (Bengali for "Reminiscences and Letters of Buddhadeva Bose") portray the age of artistic excitement in Kolkata of the 1950s and 1960s. Datta's original works include two books of short stories.

Her translations include Kalki by Dr. Radhakrishnan, Dr. Zhivago by Boris Pasternak, journals of Fanny Parkes, and the autobiography of the ballet dancer Le Cunxin.

== Literary and cultural organizations ==
In USA, Datta has been the President of the Tagore Society of New York. She was the founder of the New Jersey–based drama group Aastha.

== Biographical book ==
In 2017, a collection of essays on Minakshi Datta and Jyotirmoy Datta was published in the Kolkata Book Fair, titled A Liber Amicorum - Jyotirmoy Datta o Minakshi Datta, Bondhuder Lekhay. The book has articles in Bengali and English.

== Acting ==
Datta has acted in two Bengali feature films – Dinen Gupta's Banajyotsna and Buddhadev Dasgupta's Continent of Love. She has also acted in several plays, including Rabindranath Tagore's Shesh raksha, Chirakumar sabha, Dalia and Grihaprabesh.

== Bibliography ==
- Data, Minakshi; Data, Jyotirmoy (2017). Life of Minakshi Datta: "A Liber Amicorum". De's Publishing. ISBN 978-81-295-2959-6.
- Cunxin, Le (2013). Mao-er shesh nartak. Protivas.
- Data, Minakshi (2009). Bedside Mini-Detective Series. Protivas.
- Parkes, Fanny (2007). Saheb Bibi Bonik Harem. Protivas.
