= Ruposhi Bangla =

1957 collection of poems by Jibanananda Das

Ruposhi Bangla (Bengal the beautiful or The Beauteous Bengal )
- First edition's cover by Satyajit Ray.
- Author: Jibanananda Das
- Translator: Joe Winter, A K Basu Majumdar
- Cover artist: Signet Press 1957 edition cover by Satyajit Ray
- Language: Bengali
- Genre: Poetry, Sonnet
- Publisher: First edition in Bengali by Signet Press, Joe Winter's English translation by Anvil Press Poetry, A K Basu Majumdar's English translation by Mittal Publication, etc.
- Publication date: 1957
- English publication date: 1987, 2006
- Pages: 79 in English (Anvil Press Poetry 2006 edition), 101 (The Beauteous Bengal published by Mittal)
- ISBN: 978-0-85646-390-7 (of Bengal the beautiful), 978-0836422399 (of The Beauteous Bengal)
- OCLC: 76907525
- Preceded by: Bela Obela Kaalbela

Ruposhi Bangla (Bengali: রূপসী বাংলা, Beautiful Bengal) is the most popular collection of poems by Jibanananda Das, the great modern Bengali poet.

== History ==
It was written in 1934, the sixty-two sonnets - discovered in an exercise-book twenty years after Das wrote them - achieved instant popularity on their posthumous publication in 1957, becoming a totemic symbol of freedom in Bangladesh's 1971 War of Independence. In Ruposhi Bangla, Das seamlessly blends in both real and mythical historical figures, as well as mythical creatures such as the shuk bird, weaving a tapestry of a beautiful, dreamlike Bengal The poems celebrate the beauty of Barishal. In these poems infused with a scent of unrequited love, Jibanananda Das captured his country's soul through evocations of village life and natural beauty. Satyajit Ray designed the cover of 1957 edition.

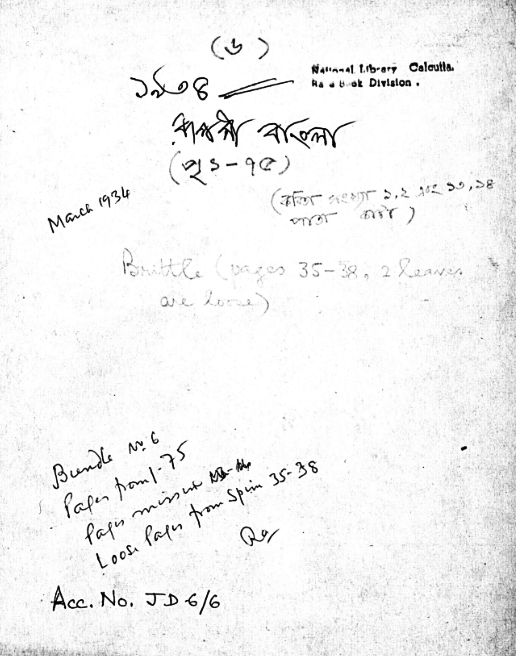
First page of the manuscript containing sonnets of "Rupashi Bangla" (Bengal, the Beautiful), by poet Jibanananda Das

Go where you will – I shall remain on Bengal’s shore

Shall see jackfruit leaves dropping in the dawn’s breeze;
Shall see the brown wings of shalik chill in the evening,
Its yellow leg under the white down goes on dancing
In the grass, darkness – once, twice – and then suddenly
The forest’s oak beckons it to its heart’s side,
Shall see sad feminine hands – white conch-bangles
Crying like conch shells in the ash-grey wind:
She stands on the pond’s side in the evening,

As if she will take the parched rice hued duck
To some land of legends –
As if the fragrance of the quiltcover clings to her body,
As if she is born out of watercress in the pond’s nest –
Washes her feet silently – then goes faraway, traceless
In the fog – yet I know I shall not lose her
In the crowd of the earth –

She is there on my Bengal’s shore.

— Jibanananda Das, Ruposhi Bangla
