= Banajyotsna =

1969 Bengali film

Banajyotsna is a Bengali drama film directed by Dinen Gupta, based on a same name novel of Bengali author Narayan Gangopadhyay. The film was released on 15 August 1969 under the banner of Sanchita Films. This was the second film of the director Dinen Gupta.

== Plot ==
A wanted political activist Mahitosh takes shelter in a tribal village surrounding with dense forest. He goes through psychological dilemma while involving romantically with a young Santhal woman, Shiukumari. Shiukumari works as labour under a local influential businessman cum goon. When she through her humiliation and pain, is released by praying to the goon and wants to start a new life with Mahitosh, Mahitosh's old fugitive comrade returns. Mahitosh disappears leaving Shiukumari alone.

== Cast ==
- Samit Bhanja as Mahitosh
- Ajitesh Bandopadhyay as Arabinda
- Kajal Gupta
- Kanu Banerjee
- Minakshi Datta
- Sabita Basu
- Padma Devi
- Niranjan Ray
- Nirmal Ghosh
