= Campe (poem) =

"Campe" (Bengali: "ক্যাম্পে", /kæmpe/, English: "In Camp") is a Bengali poem by Jibanananda Das. It was first published in the literary magazine Paricay in 1932. The poem was later included in Jibanananda Das' poetry book Dhushor Pandulipi (The Grey Manuscript) published in 1936. The poem gave rise to controversy on publication.

Das sent the poem to Paricay on the request of the poet Bishnu Dey, one of the editors of the magazine. Another editor, Sudhindranath Datta, deemed the poem incomprehensible and denied to publish it. Bishnu Dey, however, managed to get the poem published. After its publication, the literary critic Sajanikanta Das accused Das of obscenity. Most of controversies rose from Das’ use of the expression “ghai harini” which in English means “doe in heat”. “Harini” is a Bengali word intelligible to everyone; but “ghai”, an etymologically Assamese word, is used in Bengali by professional hunters to refer to a live decoy used to lure game. Das’ brother Ashokanananda Das suggested that Das who never hunted in his life might have learned the word in his youth from professional hunters who did expeditions into the mangrove forest Sundarbans, which was in the vicinity of Barisal, the hometown of Das.

Many, including Buddhadeb Bosu and Achintya Kumar Sengupta, thought Das was expelled from his teaching profession because of this poem, though later researchers refuted this view. After the poet's death, an explanatory note written by Das was found that intended to reduce the controversy. However, he did not publish it as he thought that it is not possible for an author to fully control the meaning of a text. In that note, Das wrote the melody that pervades "In Camp" is one "of life's helplessness—for all life, that of man, of worm, of locust."
