= Jibanananda Prize =

- Awarded for: Works produced in Bengali language
- Country: Bangladesh
- Established: 2007

Jibanananda Prize, also known as Jibanananda Puroshkar, is a literary award instituted in Bangladesh in the memory of the Indian Bengali poet Jibanananda Das. The prize is given away every year to the best works of poetry and prose by Bangladeshi authors.

== Background ==
The award was first initiated in 2007 by the Bangladeshi literary organisations "Sahitya Soikat" of Jhalakathi, "Dhanasiri" of Barisal and "Durba" magazine of Gopalganj. Later other literary and cultural organisations like "Right Foundation Bangladesh", "Adda" and . The awards are being given every year to a poet and a prose writer for original literary works produced in Bengali language in Bangladesh.

== List of prize winners ==
- 2019 :- Jewel Mazhar for poetry; Abdul Mannan Sarker for prose
- 2014 :- Khaled Hossain for poetry; Imtiar Shamim for prose
- 2013 :- Khonadakar Ashraf Hossain for poetry; Shantanu Kaisar for prose
- 2006 :- Shamsur Rahman
