= Joe Winter =

British poet and literary critic (born 1943)

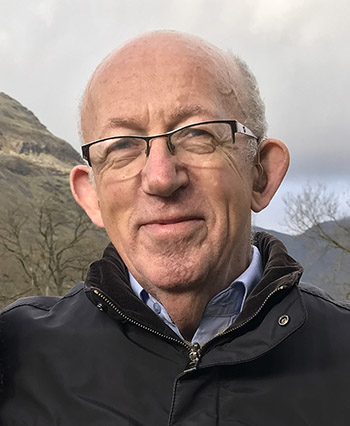
- Born: 1943 (age 82–83); London
- Occupations: Poet, translator, author and teacher
- Employer: Teaches part-time
- Works: See website
- Website: joewinter-poet.com

Joe Winter is a British poet, literary critic and translator of poetry. A recent long poem is At the Tate Modern. His translations of the Bengali poets Rabindranath Tagore and Jibanananda Das are published by Carcanet Press, and his versions in modern English of the Anglo-Saxon epic Beowulf and the Middle English poem Pearl are with Sussex Academic Press. SAP has also published Two Loves I Have: a new reading of Shakespeare’s Sonnets and Hide Fox, and All After: What lies concealed in Shakespeare's 'Hamlet'?

== Biography ==
Winter was born in 1943 and educated at Magdalen College School, Oxford and Exeter College, Oxford. He taught English in London comprehensive schools from 1967 to 1994, when he went to live in Calcutta, India (now Kolkata), returning to England in 2006. While in India he taught part-time in a variety of schools, wrote articles of literary and general interest (in particular for The Statesman of Kolkata), and translated a number of volumes of the poetry and prose of Rabindranath Tagore and the poetry of Jibanananda Das from the Bengali original (see website Publications), having learnt Bengali during the period. Back in England he continues to teach, and now does so part-time. He has never stopped writing poetry.

== Literary works ==
Winter began to write poetry in 1961. His first book publication was A Miracle and the Tree with Anvil Press in 1972. While in India he wrote literary articles and general essays for the press, in particular The Statesman of Kolkata. Writers Workshop of Kolkata has brought out all his original poetry (currently 21 volumes). Winter is gradually uploading all his original poetry onto his website.

== Calcutta poems ==
Winter composed a number of poems during his Calcutta life some of which have been published under the title Guest and Host. The book cover suggests they record 'the experience of being welcomed into the household of another country'. They appear to deal with the commonplace and to touch on the numinous. The volume comprises four long poems. The first is a sonnet-sequence, Guest and Host; the next, Earthquake at Kutch, is a response in five parts to the 2001 disaster in Gujarat. The Undefeated is a first-person Memoir of an old Indian Infantry Officer of the British Raj (so subtitled at the subject's request). The concluding poem, Meditation on the Goddess, is an exploration of the annual festival in celebration of the goddess Durga in the state of West Bengal. The last-mentioned poem begins:

Goddess, Durga, lightning-eyed

in the dark fortnight of the moon,

mother, daughter, maiden, bride,

come. Invisibly you ride

a lion to the noble house

of first belonging. Mountainous

it is, and river-full, and wide.

Come

Grant me beauty, glory, fame and destroy my enemy.

Mother Durga, who appears

like the sun at burning noon,

whose sidelong looks will hurtle spears

through enemy hearts --- yet whose light rears

the heart in pure leaf --- come to us,

revisiting your first-born house.

We wait in joy, we wait in tears.

Come

Grant me beauty, glory, fame and destroy my enemy.

== Translations ==
In addition to poetry of his own, Winter has published translations of Rabindranath Tagore's Gitanjali (as Song Offerings), Lipika and other works. Gitanjali is Nobel Laureate Tagore's most famous volume: Winter's was the first lyrical poem-by-poem rendition of the entire Bengali original. In collaboration with Devadatta Joardar he has also translated Tagore's autobiographical essays Atmaparichay under the title Of Myself.

Winter translated Rupasi Bangla of poet Jibanananda Das under the title of Bengal the Beautiful. Further versions of his of the poems of Jibanananda have been collected in the volume Naked Lonely Hand. He has also rendered 25 of the songs of Lalan Fakir into English. Winter's The Golden Boat (title derived from Tagore's Bengali volume Sonaar Tori), a wide-ranging collection of Tagore poems in English translation, has been published by Anvil Press (now with Carcanet Press).

The texts of Winter's translations are available from the relevant publishers (see website). In addition versions of a few ballads of the mediaeval French poet Francois Villon and some poems from the Bengali of Rachana Kobira appear in the volumes of his original poetry, respectively Zimbabwe in August and Lalon Fakir at the Kolkata Book Fair.

== Publications ==
Writers Workshop, Kolkata, have brought out all of Winter's original poetry in 21 books (to date). He published Calcutta Song (Sahitya Samsad Kolkata and Peridot Press UK) which is an account in prose and poetry of living in Kolkata for twelve years. He has translated a notable amount of Bengali poetry into English. This includes: Gitanjali (the full original Gitanjali by Rabindranath Tagore), The Golden Boat (a selection of Tagore's poems from first to last), Of Myself (Tagore's Atmaparichay, co-translated with Devadatta Joardar), Naked Lonely Hand (a selection of the poems of Jibanananda Das), Bengal the Beautiful (translation of Rupasi Bangla by Jibanananda Das), Dark (poems of Susmita Bhattacharya) and Lipika (a volume of prose poems and short stories by Tagore). Carcanet Press has his Tagore and Das translations, and Guest and Host and A Miracle and The Tree. Sussex Academic Press publish his two critical works on Shakespeare and his transcreations of Beowulf and Pearl. Writers Workshop (Kolkata) in addition to all his original poetry publish a number of other works of his, including An Enquiry into Poetic Method (see website).
