= Naresh Guha =

Indian writer

Naresh Guha (1923/24-2009) was a Bengali poet. He was born in 1923 (March) in Binnafoir village of Mymensingh district in undivided Bengal. His original name was Nareshchandra Guha Bakshi. He was son of Rameshchandra Guha Bakshi and Indumati devi. He died on 4'th January in 2009. He started his career as a journalist with the Jugantor, where he was friends with Amiya Chakrabarty. He reported on the 1946 Calcutta riots. In the 1950s, he worked as a college teacher, eventually joining the faculty of Jadavpur University. His first collection of poems came out in 1952, titled Duronto Dupur. He later won the Sahitya Akademi Award for his collected poems, titled Kobita Shongroho.

== Education ==
He completed his initial study from Santosh Janhavi High School in 1939. Then he joined Ripon college for ISC. He completed his graduation in pass course from Ripon college. In 1945 he did his master's in English from Calcutta University. He went to United States of America for higher studies and did his research work on 'Irish poet William Buttler Yeats in Indian vision' in 1962 from North Western University.

== Work life ==
Guha started his working life as a journalist of 'Yugantor' news paper. During his student life he had Amiya Chakraborty as his teacher. In 1946 he met Amiya Chakraborty personally and went to riot downtrodden Noyakhali with him for Mahatma Gandhi's Shanti Mission. He went to riot ravaged Andheri village of Bihar along with Amiya Chakraborty. There in 1947 on 29'th April he met Mahatma Gandhi and got Gandhiji's vicinity. In 1946 in the month of August Bengal riot took place in British ruling Kolkata. Guha as a reporter covered this news; but news paper authority changed the headline of the news without his permission, so he left 'Yugantor patrika'. After that he worked as an editor of a Bengali monthly news paper 'Tukro Kotha' with help of Dilip Gupta of Signet press. In the year of 1956 he joined Department of Comparative Literature in Jadavpur University and left Charuchandra College.

== Books ==
Love and nature are two core elements in his writings. Guha's first book was 'Duronto Dupur' (1952). He was called 'Duronto Dupurer Kobi'. Then he wrote 'Tatarsomudro Ghera' (1976), 'Bidishar Ini Ar Uni' (1993), 'Kobita Songroho' (1993), essay collection named 'Antorale Dhwoni - Protidhwoni' (1994). He edited 'Kobir Chithi Kobike' (1995), 'Sahityasarathir Somipe' (2000), 'Amlan Duttar Khankoy Chithi ' ( 2001) 'W.B Yeats / An Indian Approach ' (1968), ' In Praise of Two Bengali Novels And Other Essays ' ( 1997). He also worked as an editor for magazines like 'Tukro Kotha', Jadavpur Journal Of Comparative Literature (1964-1983), Visva - Bharati Quarterly ' (1984-1987), fifth volume of Buddhadev Bose's poetry collection and second volume of Amiya Chakraborty's poetry collection, Amiya Chakraborty's letter to Rabindranath Tagore and Pramatha Chowdhury (those two books were annotated and eminent). Guha helped Amiya Chakraborty in publishing his two poetry collections 'Durojatri' and 'Parapar'. He wrote a critique of 'Parapar'. He translated Sartre's drama and named it 'Kapat' in 1996.

== Awards ==
Guha achieved 'Asan' award from Kerala for 'Tatarsomudro Ghera' in 1979 and Sahitya Academy award for poetry collection in 1995.
