= Samar Sen (poet) =

Indian poet

- Born: 10 October 1916; Calcutta, Bengal Presidency, British India
- Died: 23 August 1987 (aged 70); Calcutta, West Bengal, India
- Citizenship: India
- Education: Graduate
- Alma mater: Scottish Church College, at the University of Calcutta
- Writing career
- Language: Bengali

Samar Sen (Bengali: সমর সেন; 10 October 1916 – 23 August 1987) was a prominent Indian Bengali poet and journalist in the post-Independence era.

== Education ==
Samar Sen was a graduate of the Scottish Church College, at the University of Calcutta.

== Early life and career ==
Sen was born in a well-known Vaidya family. Sen's grandfather, Dinesh Chandra Sen, was a well-known writer and member of the Bangiya Sahitya Parishad. His father, Arun Sen, an academic, noted, "I am the son of an illustrious father and the father of an illustrious son!" Samar Sen, along with Subhash Mukhopadhyay, belonged to the second generation of modern Bengali poets. He gave up poetry fairly early, however, and devoted the better part of his later life to Marxist politics and journalism. He was the editor of the leftist newspaper Frontier, published from Kolkata, which was banned during the period of the Indian Emergency (1975 -1977) declared by Prime Minister Indira Gandhi.

== Poetry ==
Samar Sen, like his poetic contemporaries, grew up under the gigantic impact of Rabindranath Tagore. Yet Sen was perhaps the first to 'break' with the lyrical romanticism of Tagore and introduce "modern" concerns (disenchantment, decadence, avant-garde urban perspectives) into Bengali verse. Through his work, the influence of French and English modernism was first translated into Bengali verse; at the same time, the convergence of modernism and Marxism was evident early on in his poetic thought and style. His poetry was somewhat overshadowed by his very original journalism, produced while he served as editor of the legendary Frontier. He was also known for his translations of Soviet literature; he spent nearly five years in Moscow working as a translator, although later in life he became doubtful about bureaucratic Communism. Samar Sen also edited the radical journal Now, publishing a galaxy of prominent scholars and writers, including Joan Robinson and Satyajit Ray; his deputy editor was the playwright and actor Utpal Dutt. In his private life Sen was a man with a wry sense of humour, sometimes acerbic but often lethally accurate. He never regretted the sacrifice of what could have been a comfortable material life, supported by conventional measures of bourgeois success. His loyalty was always to the downtrodden. Some critics mourn his abandonment of poetry as a loss to Indian literature, reasoning that his acute perception and extraordinary command of languages would have continued to produce memorable verse of lasting significance. Sen decided, however, that poetry was a luxury in a world of gross deprivation and injustice and decided he would instead dedicate himself to agitating on behalf of the poor, regardless of the cost to himself. He remained committed to this cause for the rest of his life, despite experiencing significant poverty himself.

== Tribute ==
- ... He is comparatively modern poet without being progressive. He has dedicated his first work to Muzaffar Ahmad. I pray that it should mean something more than a mere personal allegiance ... Brevity is its (his poems') soul ... Samar Sen is an up-to-date representative poet. He needs to be progressive by informing himself with a sense of history. He has also yet to be symbolic. Still there is no doubt of his being a poet of a particular genre. (Dhurjati Mukherji)
- We talk about being rid of the influence of Rabindranath [Tagore]; as if we take it for granted that the influence of Rabindranath is inevitable in a young Bengali poet's endeavour. But what amazes me is that this young poet has never been under the influence of Rabindranath. (Buddhadeb Basu)

=== Quotes ===
- Among those who are penning modern Bengali poetry, most of them haven't joined a political movement, and that's sad. But many of them are powerful writers and have impacted the middle class society. Reason? Because many of them have brought changes in their perspective and expression, breaking the ivory tower of a mere aesthetics of truth, beauty and goodness and by being conscious of the disgust and the multi-layered failure of the middle class life.
- In these times of dereliction and dismay, of wars, unemployment and revolutions, the decayed side of things attracts us most ... Perhaps that is because we have our roots deep in the demoralized petty bourgeoisie and lack the vitality of a rising class.
- Our poetry (Bengali poetry) is basically without a tradition.

Samar Sen was founder-editor of the weekly magazine Frontier, first published in 1968.

== See also ==
- Hungry generation
