= Amiya Chakravarty =

Indian literary critic (1901–1986)

- Born: Amiya Chandra Chakravarty; 10 April 1901; Serampore, British Raj (now India)
- Died: 12 June 1986 (aged 85); Santiniketan, West Bengal, India

Amiya Chandra Chakravarty (1901–1986) was an Indian literary critic, academic, and Bengali poet. He was a close associate of Rabindranath Tagore, and edited several books of his poetry. He was also an associate of Gandhi, and an expert on the American catholic writer and monk, Thomas Merton. Chakravarty was honoured for his own poetry with the Sahitya Akademi Award in 1963. He taught literature and comparative religion in India for nearly a decade and then for more than two decades at universities in England and the U.S. In 1970, he was honoured by the Government of India with the Padma Bhushan award.

== Education and career ==
He studied in Hare School, Calcutta and graduated from St. Columba's College, Hazaribagh, which was then under Patna University. He joined Visva-Bharati University in 1921 as a student. Later, he became a teacher there.

He was literary secretary to Rabindranath Tagore from 1924 to 1933. During this time, he was a close associate of the poet. He was Tagore's travel companion during his tours to Europe and America in 1930 and to Iran and Iraq in 1932.

He was also a close associate of Mahatma Gandhi, walking with Gandhi in the Salt March of 1930.

Following his 1933 journey with Tagore, he left India to study at Oxford University, and in 1937 earned a D.Phil. He worked at Oxford as a senior research fellow from 1937 to 1940. During this time, he also taught in Selly Oak College in Birmingham as a lecturer. He moved back to India in 1940 to become a professor of English at the University of Calcutta.

In 1948, Chakravarty moved to the US to join the Department of English in Howard University. He was a visiting fellow in English at Yale University, and a fellow of the Institute for Advanced Study in Princeton during 1950–51. In 1953, he became a professor of Comparative Oriental Religions and Literature, Boston University. He also held professorships at Smith College and later the State University of New York at New Paltz.

He wrote both poetry and prose and a number of articles in journals of India, England and the United States. He wrote many verse collections in Bengali, most notable among these are Chalo Jai and Ghare Pherar Din. His poetry reflects idealism, humanism and a great love of nature and beauty. He was awarded the Unesco Prize for his book, Chalo Jai. In 1963, he received the Sahitya Akademi Award for Ghare Pherar Din. He authored the book Dynasts and the Post-war Age in Poetry, which is a critical work on Thomas Hardy's poetry.

Chakravarty met with many of the notable figures of his time, including Jawaharlal Nehru, Albert Schweitzer, Boris Pasternak, Albert Einstein and Thomas Merton.

He visited Merton in November 1966 at the Abbey of Gethsemani in Kentucky. Merton later dedicated his book, Zen and the Birds of Appetite (1968), to Chakravarty.

He served as a delegate to the United Nations for India

Chakaravarty edited a number of English translations of Tagore's works. Most well known among these are: A Tagore Reader (1961) and The Housewarming and other Selected Writings (1965). He was also a consulting editor for The Asian journal of Thomas Merton by Thomas Merton.

== Recognition ==
- Padma Bhushan from the Govt. of India (1970)
- The Deshikottama from Visva-Bharati
- Sahitya Akademi Award (1963)
