= Clinton B. Seely =

American academic and translator

Clinton Booth Seely (Bengali: ক্লিনটন বুথ সিলি) (born June 21, 1941) is an American academic and translator, and a scholar of Bengali language and literature. He has translated the works of Ramprasad Sen and Michael Madhusudan Dutt and written a biography of Bengali poet Jibanananda Das. He has also authored software packages related to Bengali. His latest book, Barisal and Beyond, was published in India in 2008.

== Life and work ==
Clinton Seely studied at Stanford University, where he majored in biology. Upon graduation in 1963, he joined the US Peace Corps, and travelled to the then-East Pakistan (now Bangladesh) as a Corps volunteer. There, for two years, he helped to teach biology at the Barisal Zilla School in the southern district of Barisal. He studied Bengali at a local missionary school. Seely's attachment to Bangladesh and its culture dates from this period.

Upon his return to the US, he entered the University of Chicago's Department of South Asian Languages and Civilizations. There he studied under the tutelage of Edward C. Dimock, Jr., a scholar of Bengali, and gained his master's degree in 1968.

Around this time, Seely met the Bengali poet and journalist Jyotirmoy Datta at a writer's workshop in Iowa. Datta encouraged him to take up poet Jibanananda Das as the subject of his doctoral research.

Consequently, Seely returned to Bengal in 1969, this time arriving in Calcutta, the city where Das had studied for his university degrees, and where he had lived and worked intermittently later in his life, before finally settling in 1946. Seely's investigations took him far and wide, from the libraries of Calcutta to the very street where the poet was run over by a tram in 1954.

He returned to Chicago in 1971, and commenced teaching Bengali. His Ph.D thesis, on the life and works of Jibanananda Das, was completed in 1976. The title of the doctoral dissertation was: Doe in Heat: A Critical Biography of the Bengali Poet Jibanananda Das (1899–1954).

In the meantime, Seely had also completed his first work of translation – Buddhadeva Bose's popular and controversial novel Raat Bhorey Brishti, which appeared under the English title Rain Through the Night in 1973. He turned his researcher's attention on to the 19th-century poet Michael Madhusudan Dutt. The translation of Dutt's epic poem Meghnad Bodh Kavya, a project that Seely began in the 1970s, would not be completed for another three decades.

Seely retired from the University of Chicago in 2008.

== Publications ==
In addition to numerous chapters and poetry that Professor Seely has contributed to various books, following are the titles he has published so far. His upcoming book to be published from India is Barisal and Beyond: Essays on Bangla Literature.

- Rain through the Night. New Delhi: Hind Pocket Books, 1973 (revised by the author): Translation of a novel by Buddhadeva Bose.
- Women, Politics, and Literature in Bengal. Edited. East Lansing: Asian Studies Center, Michigan State University, 1981.
- Grace and Mercy in Her Wild Hair: Selected Poems to the Mother Goddess. Boulder, Colorado: Great Eastern Book Co., 1982 (co-author, Leonard Nathan).
- Introduction to and translation of lyrics by Ramprasad Sen, Reprinted: Prescott, Arizona: Hohm Press, 1999.
- A Bengali Prose Reader for Second-Year Students. By Edward C. Dimock, Jr. and Somdev Bhattacharji, with Ronald Inden, Arati John, and Clinton B. Seely. Chicago: The University of Chicago, Committee on Southern Asian Studies, 1988. Intermediate Bengali prose reader.
- A Poet Apart: A Literary Biography of the Bengali Poet Jibanananda Das (1899–1954), Newark, Delaware: University of Delaware Press; London and Toronto: Associated University Presses, 1990.
- Calcutta, Bangladesh, and Bengal Studies: 1990 Bengal Studies Conference Proceedings. Edited. East Lansing: Asian Studies Center, Michigan State University, 1991.
- Bengal Studies: A Collection of Essays. Co-edited with Rama Datta and Zillur Khan. New Delhi: Allied Publishers Limited, 2001.
- Intermediate Bangla. München: LINCOM EUROPA, 2002.
- The Slaying of Meghanada: A Ramayana from Colonial Bengal. New York: Oxford University Press, 2004

== Computer software ==
Professor Seely has written four computer programs to facilitate language learning. These are:

- "FLASHWORD.Bengali," 1987. An electronic "box of flash cards" in Bengali and English for the Macintosh.
- "SCRIPT.Bengali," 1988. A Bengali orthography tutor.
- "HyperBengali.I," 1989. A HyperCard stack version of An Introduction to Bengali, Part I, by E.C. Dimock, et al.
- "LearnLetters," 1989. A Bengali alphabet recognition tutor.

== Awards ==
Academic and literary awards received by Professor are as follows :

- National Defense Foreign Language Fellowship, The University of Chicago, 1965–68
- Foreign Area Fellowship, England, India, East Pakistan, & the US, 1968–71
- Fulbright-Hays Faculty Research Abroad Fellowship, Bangladesh, 1981–82
- American Institute of Indian Studies, Senior Research Fellowship, India, 1982
- "Ashoke Kumar Sarkar Memorial" Ananda Prize (Calcutta), 1993
- Special Award, 2nd North America Bangla Literature & Culture Convention (Chicago), 1997
- Dinesh Chandra Sen Research Society's "4th Annual Award for Excellence in Research in Bengali Literature" (Calcutta), 1999
- Distinguished Service Award, Cultural Association of Bengal, presented at the North American Bengali Conference (NABC 2004), Baltimore, 2004
- Fellow, Bangla Academy, Dhaka, Bangladesh, 2008
