= Sudhindranath Dutta =

Indian poet, essayist, journalist and critic (1901-1960)

- Born: 30 October 1901; Benares, Benares State, British India
- Died: 25 June 1960 (aged 58); Calcutta, West Bengal, India
- Occupations: Poet; journalist; essayist; literary critic; lecturer
- Years active: 1930–1960
- Spouses: Chhabi Basu (1924–1960; no legal divorce); Rajeshwari Vasudev (1943–1960)

Signature
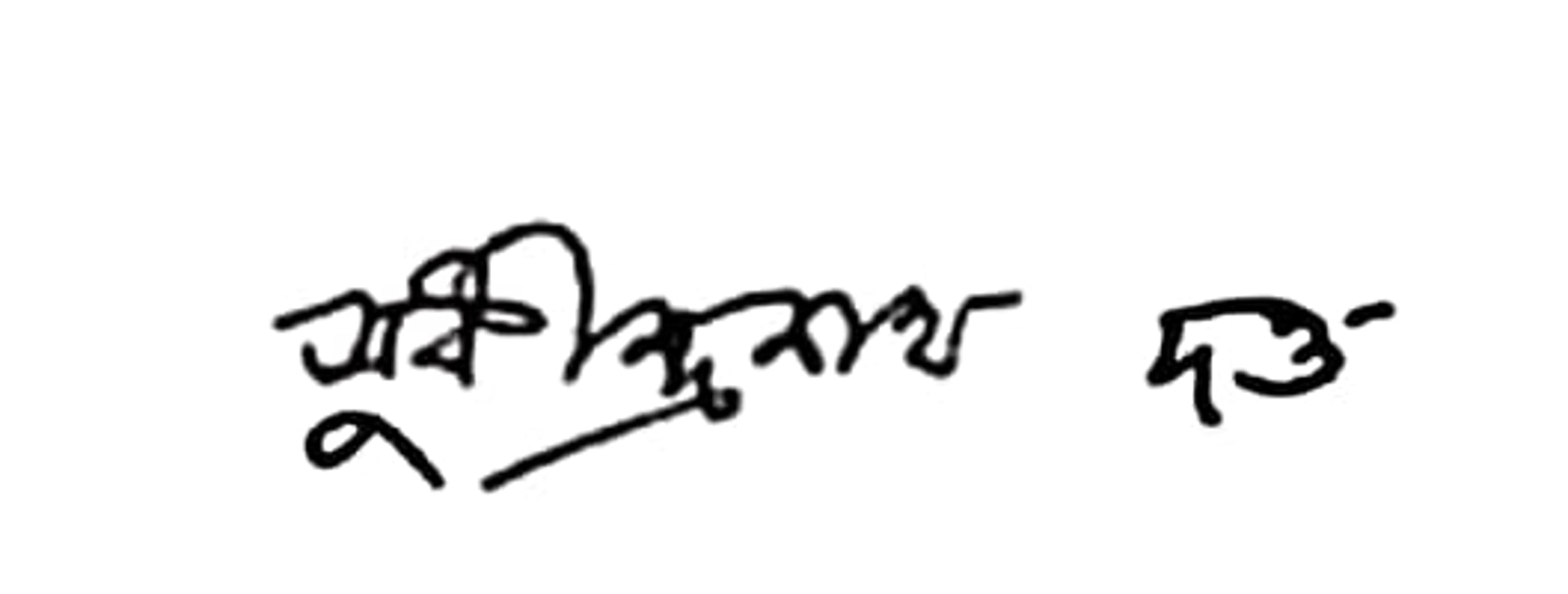

Sudhindranath Dutta (30 October 1901 – 25 June 1960) was an Indian poet, essayist, journalist and critic. Sudhindranath is one of the most notable poets after the Tagore-era in Bengali literature. He has also been called Sudhindra Datta and Sudhin Datta.

== Education ==
Sudhindranath Dutta went to the Theosophical High School in Varanasi between 1914 and 1917, and later attended the Oriental Seminary in Kolkata. He later graduated from the Scottish Church College. He later studied law at the Law College (1922–1924), while also simultaneously preparing for his finals for an MA in English literature from the University of Calcutta. However, he did not complete a degree (MA or a law degree) in either subject.

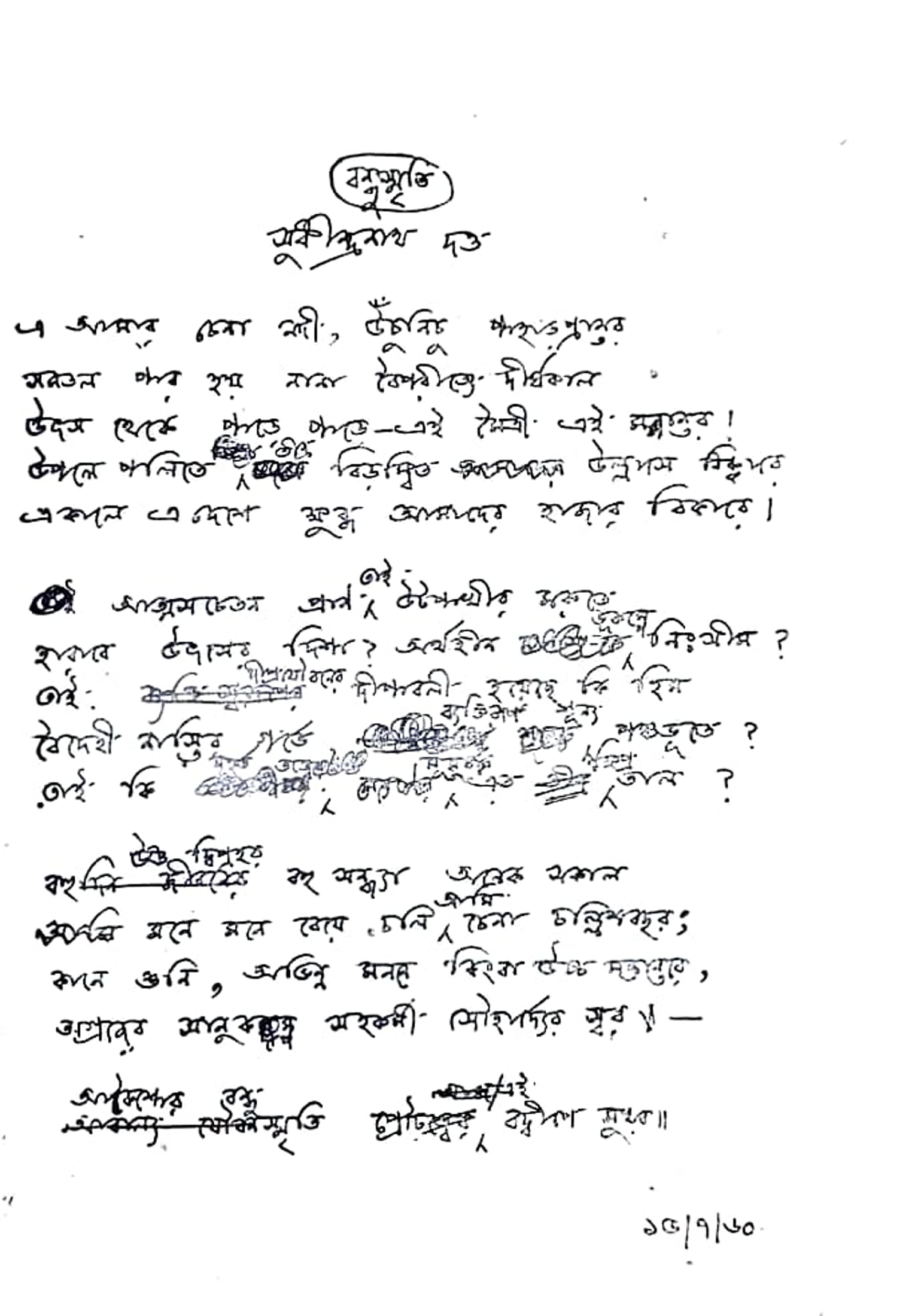
Manuscript of Sudhindranath Dutta

== Career ==
Born to the lawyer Hirendranath Dutta, and Indumati Vasu Mallik, sister of Raja Subodh Chandra Vasu Mallik, Sudhindranath became an apprentice under his father's supervision. He did not obtain a formal law degree. He married Chhabi Basu in 1924.

He started publishing Parichay, a literary magazine which heralded his philosophy, in 1931 and carried on with the job till 1943, when he left following an ideological battle with his associates, but supplied funds nevertheless. He was also associated with Sabujpatra, another noted literary magazine of the era, which was edited by eminent story-writer of the era, Pramatha Chaudhury. He worked also as a journalist for The Statesman from 1945 - 1949. He was also associated with the daily The Forward, then edited by Netaji Subhas Chandra Bose, as the organ of All India Forward Bloc. He had also worked for several companies such as Light of Asia Insurance Company from 1930 to 1933, ARP from 1942 to 1945, DVC from 1949 to 1954, and Institute of Public Opinion from 1954 to 1956.

He was a part-time lecturer of Comparative Literature in Jadavpur University from 1956 to 1957. In 1957, he left for his final foreign trip and toured Japan and Europe before moving to United States of America to join University of Chicago to write his autobiography in English. However he left the job midway and returned home to rejoin Jadavpur University to resume his classes of Comparative Literature, which he continued till his death.

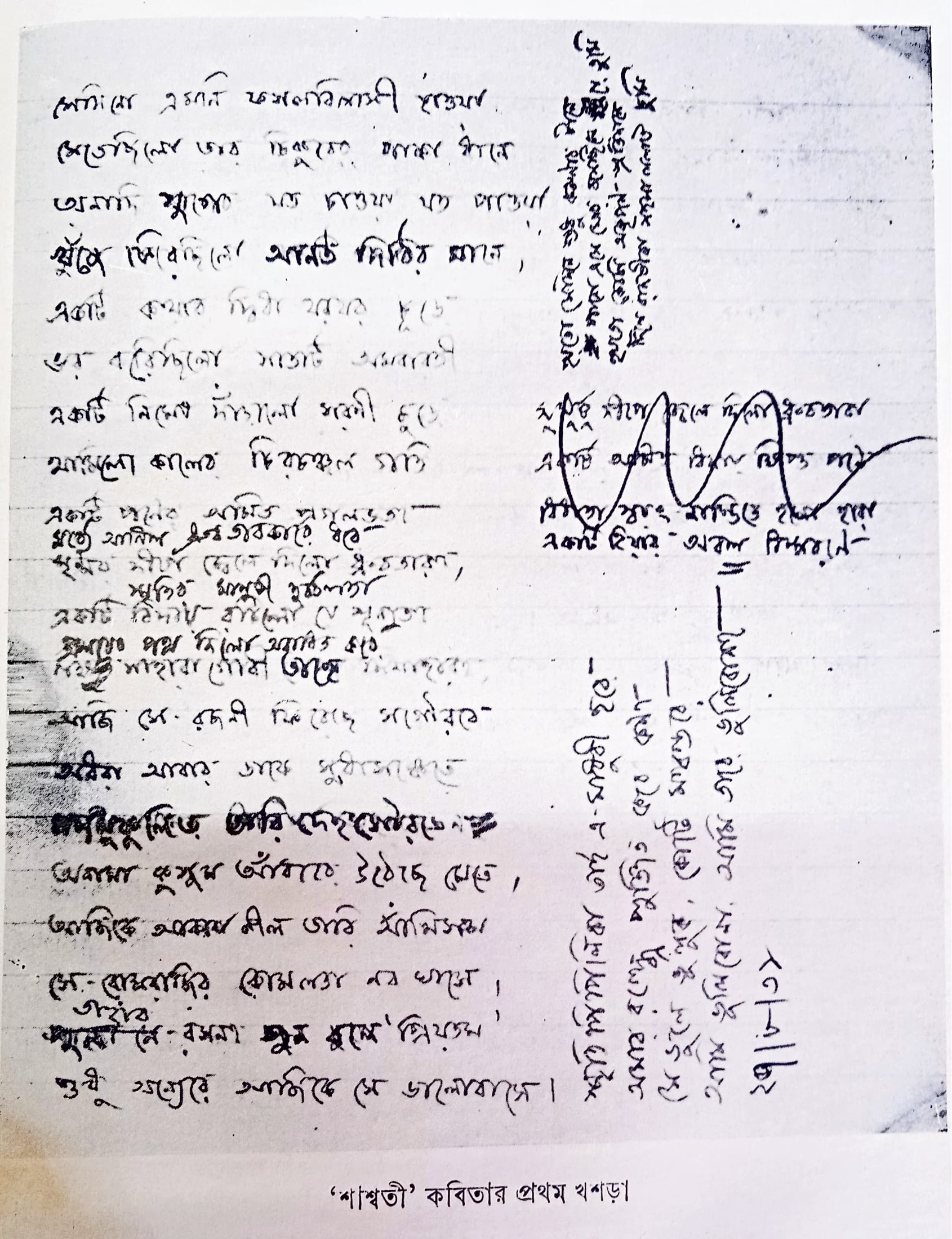
Manuscript containing a verse by Sudhindranth Dutta

== Literary Analysis Quotes ==
From An Acre of Green Grass, by Buddhadeva Bose:

Sudhindranath Dutta is altogether different. There is nothing in him that is happy or light or sparkling; all is dark, darkly and bitterly passionate. There is a profound unity in all his poems; each is a part of a larger whole, and that whole larger than the sum of his poems. Poem after poem, he is working on a theme, expounding and elaborating it, repeating and correcting himself.

Rabindranath, in a letter:

I know Sudhindra Datta's poetry from its beginning, and have grown rather partial to it. One reason for this is that it has taken much of its shape, and that quite unhesitantly, from my work. Yet its nature is entirely his own. His individuality, free from arrogance, has never neglected to make acknowledgements to the proper sources. This courage comes from power.

From Sujhit Makerjee's article:

As man, poet, and critic, the late Sudhin Datta is easily and admiringly remembered in Bengali literature of recent times. The present volume is a timely and welcome reminder that he may also have a place in the larger world of Indian letters. That such, a reminder should be presented in English is to be expected; it thus reaches all corners of India and even beyond. It is a language Datta himself employed with great skill and sensitivity, as the first part of The World of Twilight proves.

== Works ==
=== Collected poetry ===
- Tanvi (1930), M. Sarkar & Sons
- Arkesṭrā (Orchestra, 1935), Bharati Bhavan
- Krandashee (1937), Bharati Bhavan
- Uttarphālgunī (The Northerlies, 1940), Parichay Press
- Saṅgbarta (Cataclysmic Clouds, 1953), Signet Press
- Pratiddhani (1954) Signet Press
- Dashamee (1956) Signet Press.

=== Collected essays ===
- Svagato, Bharati Bhavan

Title page of the first edition of Swagata

- Svagato (1957) New changed version from Signet Press
- Kulay O Kaalpurush, (1957), Signet Press.
