= List of Bengali-language authors (alphabetical) =

Bengali literature বাংলা সাহিত্য
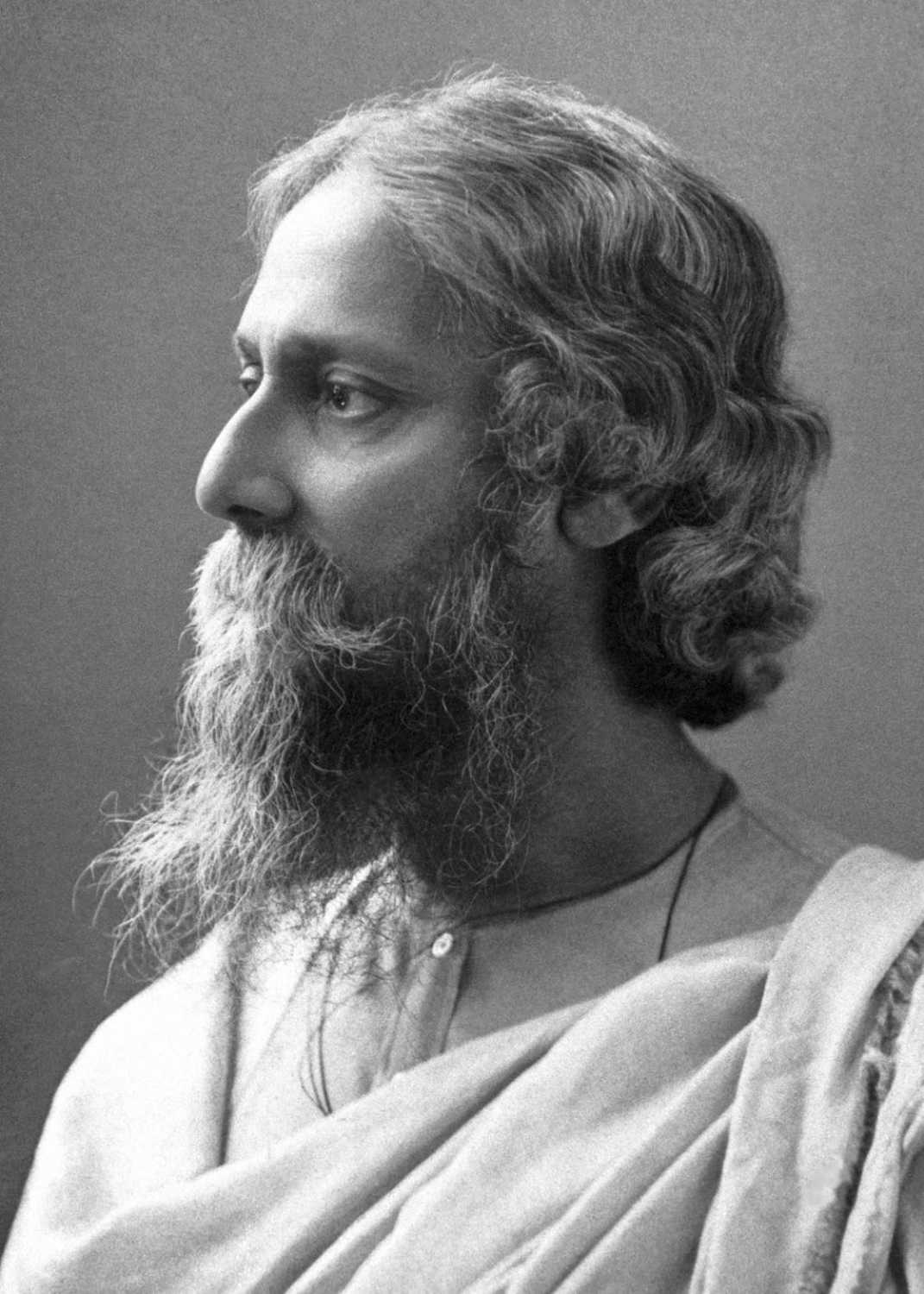
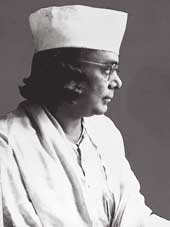
- (clockwise from top to bottom :); The oldest bengali script 'The charyapada' (top), Kazi Nazrul Islam (Bottom right), Rabindranath Tagore (Bottom left).

Bengali literature
- By category Bengali language

Bengali language authors
- Chronological list – Alphabetic List

Bengali writers
- Writers – Novelists – Poets

Forms
- Novel – Poetry – Science Fiction

Institutions and awards
- Literary Institutions; Literary Prizes

This article provides an alphabetical list of Bengali language authors. For a chronological list, see List of Bengali language authors.

== Pre-partition Bengal ==
=== A ===
- Abdul Hakim (1620–1690)
- Afzal Ali (16th-century)
- Alaol (1606–1680)
- Akkhoykumar Boral (1860–1919)

=== B ===
- Bankim Chandra Chattopadhyay (1838–94)
- Bharatchandra Ray (1712–60)
- Begum Rokeya (1880–1932)

=== D ===
- Daulat Qazi (1600–1638)
- Dawlat Wazir Bahram Khan (16th-century)
- Dinesh Chandra Sen (1866–1939)
- Dwijendralal Ray (1863–1913)

=== E ===
- Ekramuddin Ahmad (1872–1940)
- Eyakub Ali Chowdhury (1888–1940)

=== G ===
- Girish Chandra Ghosh (1844–1912)
- Girish Chandra Sen (1835/36-1910)
- Gobindachandra Das (1885–1918)

=== H ===
- Heyat Mahmud (1693–1760)

=== I ===
- Ismail Hossain Siraji (1880–1931)
- Ishwar Chandra Gupta (1812–59)
- Ishwar Chandra Vidyasagar (1820–91)

=== K ===
- Krittibas Ojha (1443-15??)

=== M ===
- Muhammad Muqim (18th-century)
- Muhammad Sadeq Ali (1801-62)
- Michael Madhusudan Dutt (1824–73)
- Mohammad Lutfur Rahman (1889–1936)

=== N ===
- Nabinchandra Sen (1847–1909)
- Nabinkali Devi (fl. 1886)
- Nur Qutb Alam (died 1416)

=== P ===
- Pramatha Chowdhury (1868–1946)
- Prabhat Kumar Mukhopadhyay (1873–1932)

=== R ===
- Rabindranath Tagore (1861–1941)
- Rahimunnessa (1763–1800)
- Rajanikanta Sen (1865–1910)

=== S ===
- Sarasibala Basu (1886–1929)
- Satyendranath Dutta (1882–1922)
- Satyendranath Tagore (1842–1923)
- Shah Muhammad Saghir (14th-century)
- Sharat Chandra Chattopadhyay (1876–1938)
- Sheikh Fazlul Karim (1882–1936)
- Sukumar Ray (1887–1923)
- Swami Nigamananda (1880–1935)
- Swami Vivekananda (1863–1902)
- Swarnakumari Devi, (1855–1932)
- Syed Sultan (1550–1648)

=== T ===
- Troilokyanath Mukhopadhyay (1847–1919)

=== U ===
- Upendrakishore Ray (1863–1915)

=== Z ===
- Zainuddin (15th-century)

== Bangladesh ==
=== A ===
- Abdullah Abu Sayeed (b. 1939)
- Abdullah-Al-Muti (1930–1998)
- Abdul Gaffar Choudhury (b. 1934)
- Abdul Mannan Syed (b. 1943)
- Abdul Kadir (1906–84)
- Abdul Karim Sahitya Bisharad (1869–1953)
- Abdur Rouf Choudhury (1929–1996)
- Abu Ishaque (1926–2003)
- Abu Rushd
- Abubakar Siddique (b. 1936)
- Abujafar Shamsuddin (1911–89)
- Abul Kashem (1920–1991)
- Abul Mansur Ahmed (1898–1979)
- Ahmed Sharif (1921–1999)
- Ahmed Sofa (1943–2001)
- Ahsan Habib (1917–1985)
- Ahsan Habib (cartoonist)
- Akhteruzzaman Elias (1943–97)
- Akbar Hossain (1917–1981)
- Alauddin Al-Azad (b. 1932)
- Al Mahmud
- Ali Imam
- Anwar Pasha (1928–1971)
- Anisul Hoque (b. 1965)
- Aroj Ali Matubbar
- Asad Chowdhury
- A. T. M. Shamsuddin

=== B ===
- Baby Halder (b. 1973)
- Bande Ali Mia (1906–82)
- Bashir Al Helal (b. 1936)
- Benojir Ahmed (1903–1983)
- Bipradash Barua (b. 1940)

=== D ===
- Datta, Haripada (b. 1947)
- Dewan Mohammad Azraf (1908–1999)
- Dilara Hashem (b. 1936)

=== E ===
- Ekhlasuddin Ahmed (b. 1940)

=== F ===
- Farrukh Ahmed

=== G ===
- Golam Mostofa (1897–1964)
- Nirmalendu Goon

=== H ===
- Hasan Azizul Huq (b. 1939)
- Hasnat Abdul Hye (b. 1939)
- Humayun Ahmed (b. 1948)
- Humayun Azad (1947–2004)

=== I ===
- Imdadul Haq Milon (b. 1955)

=== J ===
- Jagadish Gupta (1886–1957)
- Jahanara Imam (1929–1994)
- Jasimuddin
- Jatin Sarker (1936–2025)

=== K ===
- Kazi Abdul Odud (1894–1970)
- Kazi Nazrul Islam (1899–1976)
- Khondakar Ashraf Hossain

=== M ===
- Mahbubul Alam (1898–1981)
- Mahbub Ul Alam Choudhury (b. 1927)
- Mir Mosharraf Hossain
- Mohammad Barkatullah (1898–1974)
- Mohammad Nurul Huda (b. 1949)
- Mohammad Rafiq (b. 1943)
- Moinul Ahsan Saber (b. 1958)
- Mokbula Manzoor (b. 1938)
- Motaher Hussain Chowdhury (1903–1956)
- Muhammad Mohar Ali (1932–2007)
- M. R. Akhtar Mukul (1929–2004)
- Mufazzal Haider Chaudhury (1926–1971)
- Muhammad Asadullah Al-Ghalib (b. 1948)
- Muhammad Habibur Rahman (b. 1935)
- Muhammad Shahidullah (1885–1969)
- Muhammed Zafar Iqbal (b. 1952)
- Munier Chowdhury (1925–1971)
- Muntasir Mamun

=== N ===
- Nasir Ahmed (b. 1952)
- Nurul Momen (Sobriquet:- Natyaguru) (1908–1990)
- Nasreen Jahan (b. 1964)
- Nilima Ibrahim (1921–2002)

=== Q ===
- Qazi Anwar Hussain
- Qazi Imdadul Haq
- Qazi Motahar Hossain (1897–1981)

=== R ===
- Rabeya Khatun (b. 1935)
- Rafiq Azad
- Rahat Khan (b. 1940)
- Rakib Hasan
- Rashid Askari (b.1965)
- Rashid Haider
- Rashid Karim (b. 1925)
- Razia Khan
- Rezauddin Stalin
- Rizia Rahman(b. 1939)
- Romena Afaz (1926–2003)
- Rudra Mohammad Shahidullah (1956–1992)

=== S ===
- Salimullah Khan
- Sardar Fazlul Karim
- Sarder Jayenuddin (1918–1986)
- Selim Al-Deen (1949–2008)
- Selina Hossain (b. 1947)
- Sezan Mahmud (b. 1967)("NC 1988")
- Sen, Satyen (1907–81)
- Shah Muhammad Sagir (?)
- Shahadat Hussain (1893–1953)
- Shahed Ali (b. 1925)
- Shahid Akhand (b. 1935)
- Shahidul Zahir (1953–2008)
- Shahidullah Kaiser (1926–1971)
- Shahriyar Kabir
- Shamsuddin Abul Kalam (1926–97)
- Shamsunnahar Mahmud (1908–1964)
- Shamsur Rahman
- Shaukat Osman (1917–98)
- Sirajul Islam Chowdhury
- Sufia Kamal (1911–99)
- Syed Ali Ahsan
- Syed Abul Maksud
- Syed Emdad Ali (1880–1956)
- Syed Manzoorul Islam
- Syed Mujtaba Ali (1904–74)
- Syed Shamsul Haque (1934)
- Syed Waliullah (1922–71)

=== T ===
- Tahmima Anam (b. 1975)
- Taslima Nasrin (b. 1962)

=== W ===
- Wasi Ahmed (b. 1954)

=== Z ===
- Zahir Raihan (1935–1972)

== West Bengal ==
=== A ===
- Abanindranath Tagore (1871–1951)
- Abul Bashar (b. 1951)
- Achintyakumar Sengupta (1903–76)
- Amiya Bhushan Majumdar (1918–2001)
- Amiya Chakravarty (1901–86)
- Anil Ghorai (b. 1957)
- Annadashankar Roy (1904–2002)
- Arun Mitra (1909–2000)
- Ashapoorna Devi (1909–95)
- Ashutosh Mukherjee (1920–89)
- Atin Bandyopadhyay (1934–2019)

=== B ===
- Balai Chand Mukhopadhyay (1899–1979)
- Bani Basu (b. 1939)
- Bibhutibhushan Bandopadhyay (1894–1950)
- Bibhutibhushan Mukhopadhyay (1894–1987)
- Bijon Bhattacharya (1917–78)
- Bimal Kar (1921–2002)
- Bimal Mitra (1912–91)
- Binoy Majumdar (1934–2006)
- Bishnu Dey (1909–82)
- Buddhadeb Bosu (1908–74)
- Buddhadeb Guha (b. 1936)

=== D ===
- Dakshinaranjan Mitra Majumder (1877–1957)
- Dibyendu Palit (b. 1939)
- Dinesh Das (1913–85)

=== E ===
- Ekram Ali (b. 1950)

=== H ===
- Hemendrakumar Roy (1888–1963)

=== J ===
- Jagadish Gupta (1886–1957)
- Jatindramohan Bagchi (1878–1948)
- Jatindranath Sengupta (1880–1954)
- Jibanananda Das (1899–1954)
- Joy Goswami (b. 1954)

=== K ===
- Kalidas Roy (1889–1975)
- Kamal Kumar Majumdar (1914–79)
- Kamini Roy (1864–1933)
- Kumud Ranjan Mullick (1883–1970)

=== L ===
- Leela Majumdar (1908–2007)

=== M ===
- Mahasweta Devi (b. 1926)
- Malay Roy Choudhury (b. 1939)
- Mani Shankar Mukherjee (b. 1933)
- Manik Bandopadhyay (1908–56)
- Mohit Chattopadhyay (b. 1934)
- Moniruddin Khan (b. 1974)
- Moti Nandi (1931–2010)
- Mohitolal Majumdar (1888–1952)
- Maniklal Sinha (1916–1994)

=== N ===
- Nabanita Dev Sen (b. 1938)
- Nabarun Bhattacharya(1948–2014)
- Narayan Debnath (b. 1926)
- Narayan Gangopadhyay (1918–70)
- Narayan Sanyal (1924–2005)
- Narendranath Mitra (1916–75)
- Nihar Ranjan Gupta (1911–86)
- Nirad C. Chaudhuri (1897–1999)
- Nirupama Devi (1883–1951)

=== P ===
- Prabir Ghosh (b. 1945)
- Prabhat Ranjan Sarkar (1921–1990)
- Premendra Mitra (1904–88)
- Priyanath Mukhopadhyay (1855–1947)
- Protiva Bose (1915–2006)

=== R ===
- Rajsekhar Bose (1880–1960)

=== S ===
- Sachin Sengupta (1891–1961)
- Samaresh Majumdar (b. 1944)
- Samir Roychoudhury (b. 1933)
- Sandipan Chattopadhyay (1933–2005)
- Sanjib Chattopadhyay (b. 1936)
- Satyajit Ray (1921–92)
- Shamik Ghosh (b. 1983)
- Shankha Ghosh (1932–2021)
- Shakti Chattopadhyay (1933–95)
- Shaktipada Rajguru (b. 1922)
- Sharadindu Bandyopadhyay (1899–1970)
- Shibram Chakraborty (1902–80)
- Shirshendu Mukhopadhyay (b. 1935)
- Soumitra Biswas(b.1965) (Novelist) The most famous is Heruk ebong, and its sequel Heruk 2
- Subhas Mukhopadhyay (1919–2003)
- Subodh Ghosh (1909–80)
- Sudhindranath Dutta (1901–1960)
- Sudhir Chakravarti (1934–2020)
- Sukanta Bhattacharya (1926–47)
- Sukumar Sen (1900–92)
- Sunil Gangopadhyay (1934–2012)
- Syed Kawsar Jamal (b. 1950)
- Syed Mustafa Siraj (b. 1930)

=== T ===
- Tarapada Roy (b. 1936)
- Tarashankar Bandopadhyaya (1898–1971)

=== U ===
- Utpal Dutt (1929–93)
