= Rowshan Ali Chowdhury =

Indian politician (1874-1933)

Munshi Mohammad Rowshan Ali Chowdhury
- Born: 1874; Maguradangi, Pangsha, Faridpur District (now Rajbari District), Bengal Presidency (now Bangladesh)
- Died: 1933 (aged 58–59); Maguradangi, Pangsha, British Raj (now Rajbari District, Bangladesh)
- Other names: Roushon
- Occupation: Journalist
- Father: Enayetullah Chowdhury
- Relatives: Yakub and Awlad (younger brothers), Rokanuzzaman Khan (grandnephew)

Mohammad Rowshan Ali Chowdhury (Bengali: মোহাম্মদ রওশন আলী চৌধুরী; 1874–1933) was a Bengali journalist, writer, poet and politician.

== Early life ==
Chowdhury was born in 1874 in the village of Maguradangi in Pangsha into the aristocratic Bengali Muslim Chowdhury family of Greater Faridpur. His father was Enayetullah Chowdhury, a policeman by profession. He studied at EM School in Pangsha. His brother was Yakub Ali Chowdhury, an essayist, and his younger brother was Awlad Ali Chowdhury, also a journalist.

== Career ==
Chowdhury married a Bengali Muslim woman from Lahinipara in Kushtia District who happened to be a relative of the renowned author Mir Mosharraf Hossain. Being acquainted with the latter, the two men began to publish The Kohinoor magazine from Kushtia. He also founded the Kohinoor Sahitya Samiti (Kohinoor Literary Society) in Pangsha which would publish the magazine and the literary Purnima Sammilani (Full Moon Association) in Pangsha too. Chowdhury served as the Editor of The Kohinoor magazine. In April 1905, he was the Joint Secretary of the Rajshahi-established Bangiya Islam Mission Samiti alongside Maniruzzaman Islamabadi. As well as being a member of the Bangiya Sahitya Parishad (via executive committee election), he was also part of the Bangiya Mussalman Sahitya Samiti. He served as the editor the Persian language weekly Hablul Matin in 1912 and The Soltan weekly in 1923. Rahman was also the news editor of the monthly Mohammadi newspaper too. Mir Mosharraf Hossain and Chowdhury also planned on and advertised a fortnightly magazine by the name Hitkari though it was never published.

Though Chowdhury had a keen interest in Bengali literature; both prose and poetry, he never published any books. His works mainly consisted of opinion writing and news reports in the form of prose. Raushan Ali's biographer traced a total of twelve signed works; six poems and six essays. Almost all of these articles were published in his edited The Kohinoor. Many of his works for The Kohinoor are considered to be unsigned and therefore unable to prove that they are his writings. Jogindranath Samaddar's List of Muslim writers (1915) included the life and works of Rowshan Ali and his close relations with fellow writers.

He took part in the fifth conference of the Bangiya Sahitya Sammelan held at Hugli-Chuchura in 1912. On the third day of the conference, Chowdhury raised his condolences on the death of his acquaintance Mir Mosharraf Hossain, and was supported by Chandicharan Bandyopadhyay of the 24 Parganas.

He supported secular politics and was a supporter of the Indian National Congress. He was leader of Non-Cooperation Movement, a pro independence movement in India, in Faridpur. He supported the Khilafat Movement, a movement in India that called for the restoration of the Ottoman Empire. He served as the Chairman of the Faridpur District Congress Committee.

== Works ==
- Nītibarta - Message of Morals (essay, late 1898)
- Minoti - Request (poem, June 1904)

== Death ==
Rahman died in 1933 in Maguradanga, Pangsha Upazila, Faridpur District, East Bengal, British India.
