= Muhammad Wajed Ali =

Bangladeshi writer and journalist

Muhammad Wajed Ali (September 12, 1896 – November 8, 1954) was an East Pakistani (current Bangladesh) Writer and Journalist.

== Early life ==
Ali was born in 1896 in Banshdaha, Satkhira District, Bengal Presidency (British Ruling Period). His father was the village doctor who encouraged Ali to read. He studied at the Middle English School in Banshdaha and English High School in Babulia. He studied B.A. in Kolkata at the Bangabasi College.

== Career ==
Ali dropped out of college and joined the non-cooperation movement against the British colonial government after being inspired by Mohammad Akram Khan. He worked as the editor in a number of newspapers from 1920 to 1935. He worked at The Mohammadi, Nabajug, Bangiya Mussalman Sahitya Patrika, Saogat, Samyabadi, Mahe Nao and Sebak. He wrote a number of books including Mohamanush Mohsin, Morubhaskar, Syed Ahmad, Chotoder Hazrat Muhammad, Sharnandoni and translated many books into Bengali. Following retirement he moved to Banshdaha from Kolkata in 1935 He criticized Bengali Muslim preachers for not using the Bengali language to preach.

== Death ==
Ali died on 8 November 1954 in Banshdaha, Satkhira District, East Pakistan (now Bangladesh).
