= Abdullah al-Baqi =

Bengali Islamic scholar

Mawlana Muhammad Abdullah al-Baqi Saheb
- মুহাম্মদ আব্দুল্লাহিল বাকী

Personal life
- Born: Muhammad Abdullahil Baqi; 1886 Tubgram, Burdwan district, Bengal Province, British Raj
- Died: 1 December 1952 (aged 65–66) East Bengal, Pakistan
- Political party: Krishak Praja Party; All-India Muslim League
- Education: Lalbari Madrasa; Kanpur Madrasa
- Occupation: Religious scholar, writer, politician

Religious life
- Religion: Islam
- Denomination: Sunni
- Sect: Ahl-i Hadith
- Movement: Khilafat Movement; Non-cooperation movement Pakistan Movement

Muslim leader
- Initiated: Anjuman-i-Ulama-i-Bangala

Muhammad Abdullah al-Baqi (Bengali: মুহাম্মদ আব্দুল্লাহিল বাকী) was a Bengali Islamic scholar, writer and politician. As a member of the Central Legislative Assembly, he played an active role in the Indian independence movement. He was a prominent leader of the Ahl-i Hadith movement in North Bengal, and played a significant roles in pre-partition Ahl-i Hadith conferences.

== Early life ==
Baqui was born into a Bengali Muslim family in the village of Tubgram in Burdwan district, Bengal Province, British Raj (present-day West Bengal, India). He later migrated to the neighbourhood of Nurul Huda in Dinajpur district at an early age. He completed his primary education at the Lalbari Madrasa in Badarganj, Rangpur District. After that, he enrolled at a madrasa in Kanpur where he completed his education in Islamic studies and Arabic language.

== Career ==
In 1907, he founded the Nurul Huda Minor School and Nurul Hua Junior Madrasa. From 1951 to 1962, it became known as Nurul Huda High Madrasa. At an Islamic conference in Bogra in March 1913, he co-founded the Anjuman-i-Ulama-i-Bangala alongside Mohammad Akram Khan, Maniruzzaman Islamabadi and Muhammad Shahidullah.

Baqi was also the president of the Indian National Congress's Dinajpur branch. He took part in the Khilafat Movement and the Non-cooperation movement. Baqi was imprisoned twice for his involvement in the civil disobedience movements. In 1935, he was the president of the North Bengal Ahl-e-Hadith Conference in Haragach, Rangpur District.

In 1934, he became a member of the Central Legislative Assembly representing the Praja Party. He was elected as the president of the All Bengal Tenant Association in 1937. Baqi left the Krishak Praja Party and joined the All-India Muslim League in 1945. As a member of the Constituent Assembly of Pakistan, he contributed to the Pakistan Movement.

After the independence of Pakistan in 1947, he helped to establish the East Bengal Jamiat-e-Ahl-e-Hadith. He also associated with the Bengali language movement very early on, joining the East Bengal Language Committee and signing a twelve-member memorandum requesting the government to recognise and promote an official standardised Bengali language based on Eastern Bengali. Among those that signed the letter are Mohammad Akram Khan, Muhammad Shahidullah, Habibullah Bahar Chowdhury, Syed Muhammad Afzal, Mizanur Rahman (Deputy Minister of Education), Syed Abul Hasnat Muhammad Ismail (Deputy Inspector-General of Police), Ajit Kumar Guha, AQM Adamuddin (Professor, Naogaon Islamic Intermediate College), Abul Kalam Shamsuddin, Shamsunnahar Mahmud and Shaikh Sharafuddin (Professor, Islamic Intermediate College). Baqi also became a member of the 1st National Assembly of Pakistan and the East Pakistan Legislative Assembly. He also served as president of the Muslim League's East Bengal branch.

== Bibliography ==
Baqi wrote several works in Bengali, and he also had a fluency in Arabic, Persian, Urdu and English. His articles would generally be published on his established Anjuman-i-Ulama-i-Bangala organisation's Al-Eslam monthly magazine. He also wrote a booklet called Pirer Dhyan (Meditation of the Pir).

== Death ==
Baqui died on 1 December 1952.
