= Nurjahan Begum =

Bangladeshi women journalists

- নূরজাহান বেগম
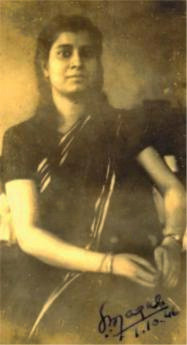
- Begum in 1946
- Born: Nurun Nahar; 4 June 1925; Chandpur District, Bengal Presidency, British India
- Died: 23 May 2016 (aged 90)
- Other names: Nuri
- Occupation: Magazine editor
- Spouse: Rokanuzzaman Khan
- Father: Mohammad Nasiruddin
- Awards: Ekushey Padak

Nurjahan Begum (4 June 1925 – 23 May 2016) was the first female journalist in Bangladesh and a trailblazer for female journalists in South Asia. Begum was awarded Ekushey Padak in 2011 by the Government of Bangladesh. She served as the editor of Begum magazine.

== Career ==
Begum was the daughter of Mohammad Nasiruddin, journalist and founder of Saogat and Begum magazines. Upon Begum Rokeya's request, she was admitted to Sakhawat Memorial School at Baby Class.

The first issue of Begum magazine was published on 20 July 1947. For the first four months, Nurjahan worked as the acting editor of the magazine helping the editor poet Begum Sufia Kamal with collecting, editing and selecting writings for the issues.

== Personal life and legacy ==
Begum was married to Rokanuzzaman Khan. Together they had two daughters, Flora Nasreen Khan and Rina Yasmin. Her granddaughter, Priota Iftekhar, is a travel vlogger - manages an online community The Flag Girl, and served as the brand ambassador for Bangladesh Tourism Corporation. She made a documentary film on Begum's 91st birth anniversary, titled “Nurjahan Begum – Itihaaser Kingbadanti Nari.”

== Awards ==
- Ekushey Padak (2011)
- Anannya Literature Award (Bengali year 1409)
