= Rokanuzzaman Khan =

Bangladeshi journalist and litterateur

- Born: 9 April 1925; Pangsha, Faridpur District (Now Rajbari District), Bengal Presidency, British India
- Died: 3 December 1999 (aged 74)
- Other names: Dadabhai
- Occupation: Journalist
- Spouse: Nurjahan Begum
- Awards: full list

Rokanuzzaman Khan (known as Dadabhai; 9 April 1925 – 3 December 1999) was a Bangladeshi journalist and litterateur. He was awarded Ekushey Padak in 1998 by the Government of Bangladesh. He was the founder director of children's organization Kochi Kanchar Mela.

== Background ==
Khan's granduncle Mohammad Rawshan Ali Chowdhury was the editor of the monthly magazine Kohinoor.

== Career ==
Khan worked at the Daily Ittehad in Kolkata in 1947 and in Shishu Saogat in 1949 and the Millat in 1951. In 1955, he joined The Daily Ittefaq under the pseudonym of Dadabhai and worked until his death in 1999.

Khan formed a children's organization Kochi Kanchar Mela in 1956.

== Personal life and legacy ==
Khan was married to Nurjahan Begum, one of the early female Bangladeshi journalists and the daughter of Mohammad Nasiruddin, founder of Saogat and Begum magazines. His granddaughter is a travel vlogger - manages an online community The Flag Girl, and served as the brand ambassador for Bangladesh Tourism Corporation.

== Works ==
- Hattimatim (1962)
- Khokan Khokan Dak Pari
- Ajob Holeo Gujob Noy

== Awards ==
- Bangla Academy Literary Award (1968)
- Shishu Academy Award (1994)
- Ekushey Padak (1998)
- Jasimuddin Gold Medal
- Rotary International and the Rotary Foundation Trust's Paul Harris Fellow Award
- Independence Day Award (2000)
