= East Pakistan Renaissance Society =

Two-nation theory political organisation

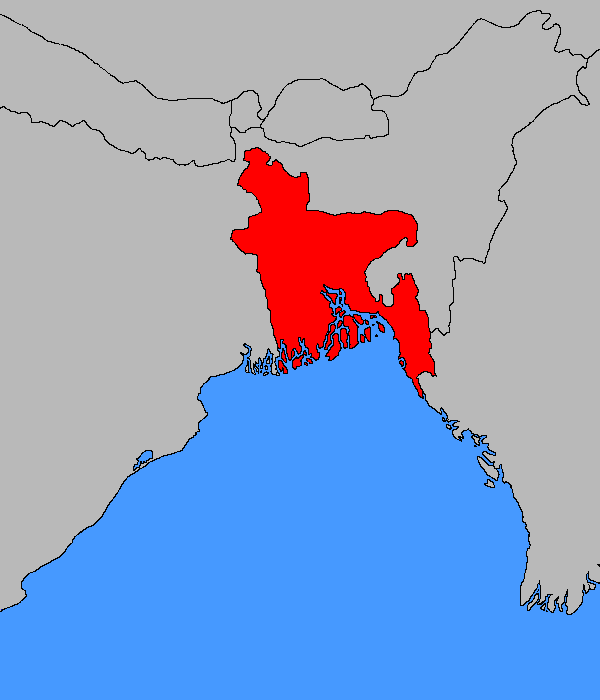
Map of East Pakistan, which later became Bangladesh.

The East Pakistan Renaissance Society was a political organisation formed to articulate and promote culturally and intellectually the idea for a separate Muslim state for Indian Muslims and specifically for the Muslims of Bengal. The organisation's founders and leaders included Abul Kalam Shamsuddin, the society president, Habibullah Bahar Chowdhury and Mujibur Rahman Khan.

== History ==
The "Two-Nation Theory", which argued that the Hindus and Muslims of India were not a common nation and could not live together as a nation, had been propagated by Muslim politicians and intellectuals such as Sir Muhammad Iqbal, Choudhary Rahmat Ali and Muhammad Ali Jinnah, the president of the All India Muslim League. The demand for a separate state for Indian Muslims took definite shape when the All India Muslim League adopted the Lahore Resolution (also known as the Pakistan Resolution) on 23 March 1940. The resolution called for the Muslim-majority provinces of British India to be constituted as separate, independent states – it did not specify a single state.

=== Foundation ===
At a meeting held on 30 August 1942, at the offices of the Azad newspaper in Kolkata, Bengali Muslim activists decided to form the East Pakistan Renaissance Society as a platform to advocate the idea of a Muslim state on a cultural and intellectual basis. The society held regular weekly meetings where articles would be presented and different issues discussed. Despite the focus on Islam, the meetings were not restricted to Muslims. Manabendranath Roy delivered a speech on Pakistan and Democracy, which highlighted the inevitability of self-rule for Indian Muslims. In September 1944, Mujibur Rahman Khan along with economist M Sadeq, published a booklet, Eastern Pakistan: Its Population, Delimitation and Economics which contained a description of the government, economy, population, geographic boundary and security of a future state of East Pakistan.

The society held its first council at the Islamia College in Kolkata in July 1944. Among those present at the inaugural occasion were Khwaja Nazimuddin, Huseyn Shaheed Suhrawardy, Hasan Suhrawardy, Nurul Amin, Mohammad Akram Khan, A K Fazlul Huq, Abul Quasem, Maulvi Tamizuddin Khan, Shahadat Hussain, Golam Mostofa, S Wajid Ali, Abu Jafar Shamsuddin, Abul Hussain, Golam Kuddus, Subhas Mukhopadhyay, Gopal Halder.

== Philosophical differences ==
The Muslim League and most other advocates of Pakistan had demanded a single state of Pakistan consisting of the British Indian provinces of Punjab, Khyber Pakhtunkhwa (then Northwest Frontier Province), Sindh, Balochistan and Bengal, and sought the Urdu language to be the only official language and lingua franca of Muslims. However, the East Pakistan Renaissance Society not only argued that Muslims were a separate nation from Hindus, it also advocated that the Bengali Muslims were distinct from the Muslims of other parts of India, on an ethnic, cultural and geographical basis. Unlike religion, the society argued that ethnicity and cultural differences cannot cross geographic boundaries. The society and its supporters in the Bengal Muslim League asserted that Bengali Muslims should constitute an independent state, as an "Eastern Pakistan" rather than part of a single state of Pakistan. The society asserted the importance of the Bengali culture and language, which many advocates of Pakistan criticised as being "Hinduised" and "Sanskritised."

== Aftermath ==
The society dissolved after the partition of India in 1947 which also partitioned Bengal to create the Muslim-majority East Bengal (also known as East Pakistan), which became part of Pakistan; Hindu-majority West Bengal and Assam became part of India. Several of the society's leaders were leading activists in the Bengali language movement (1953–1956), which was a mass struggle in East Pakistan for the recognition of the Bengali language as the second official language of Pakistan, along with Urdu.
