= Begum (magazine) =

Magazine

- Editor: Mohammad Nasiruddin
- Categories: magazine
- Frequency: Monthly
- First issue: July 20, 1947; 78 years ago
- Country: Bangladesh
- Based in: Dhaka
- Language: Bengali

Begum is a Bengali-language magazine founded in 1947. It was Bengal's first illustrated women's weekly. It covered the work of Bengali women in literary activities.

== History ==
After founding Saogat magazine in 1918, Mohammad Nasiruddin decided to publish a separate magazine solely focusing on Bengali women issues. He began the publication of Begum on July 20, 1947, from Calcutta, India. The first issue had a print run of 500 copies and each copy was priced 4 annas. Women's rights activist Begum Rokeya's photo was published on the cover of that issue. Poet and activist Begum Sufia Kamal was a founding editor.

In 1950, the publication base shifted to Dhaka. Nasiruddin's daughter, Nurjahan Begum, joined as a journalist and editor; making her as the first Bangladeshi female journalist. Early women writers of the magazine included Razia Khatun, Shamsunnahar Mahmud, Selina Panni and Protibha Ganguly. Writer Selina Hossain was involved with Begum during the 1960s.

Initially published weekly, Begum runs as a monthly magazine. As of May 2016, Nurjahan Begum's elder daughter Flora Nasrin Khan is in-charge of the operations.

An excerpt from Begum Magazine, published on March 28, 1948:

Whenever we talk about women claiming their rightful place in society and state, we can't avoid the question of their educational backwardness. It is often said that uneducated women will never be able to claim their right to the state. However, the state itself is at the root of the present lack of education and backwardness of Muslim women. Leave alone the villages. In how many cities women can move about freely and educate themselves?

=== Begum Club ===
Through Begum magazine, Begum Club was formed in 1954. It was the first female club of Bangladesh. Sufia Kamal, Fatima Sadik, and Nilima Ibrahim were on the advisory board. The club was closed in 1970.
