= Bangiya Mussalman Sahitya Samiti =

Bengali literary society

- Formation: 1911; 115 years ago
- Headquarters: Kolkata, Bengal Presidency, British India
- Region served: Bengal Presidency
- Official language: Bengali

Bangiya Mussalman Sahitya Samiti is a historic Bengali literary society that was founded in 1911 and was associated some of most well known literary figures of that era.

== History ==
Bangiya Mussalman Sahitya Samiti was founded in 1911 in Kolkata by young Bengali Muslim writers. The founders included Maulana Maniruzzaman Islamabadi, Mohammad Yakub Ali Chowdhury, Muhammad Shahidullah, Mohammad Mozammel Huq, and Mohammad Mozammel Haq. They were inspired by the Bangiya Sahitya Parishad. The Bangiya Sahitya Bisayini Mussalman Samiti, which was founded 1899 in Calcutta, was absorbed into the Bangiya Mussalman Sahitya Samiti in 1911. It was created by Syed Nawab Ali Chowdhury, a Muslim zamidar, or hereditary landlord. The aim of the organization was to create a cultural awakening in the Bengali Muslim society. Bangiya Mussalman Sahitya Samiti celebrated its jubilee in April 1941 and celebrations were inaugurated by A. K. Fazlul Huq. In May 1943 the last annual conference was held. The Bangiya Mussalman Sahitya Samiti went into decline with the creation of new organisations such as the East Pakistan Renaissance Society in 1942 in Calcutta and the Purba Pakistan Sahitya Sangsad in 1942 in Dhaka.

== Publication ==
Bangiya Mussalman Sahitya Patrika was the quarterly literary publication of the Bangiya Mussalman Sahitya Samiti. On 24 February 1918, it was decided through a meeting to start publication of the quarterly. The April issue came out in April 1918 and the last issue in April 1923. It primarily published literary works by Bengali Muslims but sometimes included works by Bengali Hindus. The publication often had works by Kazi Nazrul Islam.
