= Mohammad Mozammel Huq =

Indian Bengali-language poet (1860–1933)

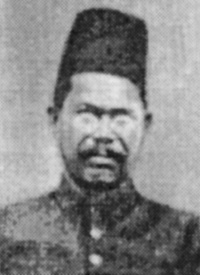
- Born: 1860; Shantipur, Nadia district, Bengal Presidency
- Died: November 30, 1933 (aged 72–73); Shantipur, Nadia district, Bengal Province
- Occupations: Poet, journalist
- Children: Azizul Haque

Mohammad Mozammel Huq (Bengali: মোহাম্মদ মোজাম্মেল হক; 1860–1933) was a Bengali-language poet, novelist, magistrate and educationist. His writings were said to have been inspired by a "Muslim renaissance".

== Early life and education ==
Mohammad Mozammel Huq was born in 1860, to a Bengali Muslim family from the village of Baweegachi, not far from the town of Shantipur, located in the Nadia district of the erstwhile Bengal Presidency. His father, Nasiruddin Ahmad, died during his childhood, and Huq was raised by his maternal grandfather in Shantipur. His talent at the vernacular examinations led to him receiving a scholarship. After completing his studies at the Tamachika Bari English School in 1285 BS (1878 CE), he enrolled at the Shantipur Municipal High School.

== Career ==
He started his career as a teacher at the Ramnagar Vernacular School in Shantipur, before transferring to the Shantipur Junior Jubilee Madrasah (later Shantipur Muslim High School) in 1887. Huq has also worked as a teaching assistant at the Tamachika Bengal School. In 1919, Ashutosh Mukherjee appointed Huq to be the examiner of Bengali language for matriculation examinations, after noticing his literary talent. He was the examiner until 1933. Huq served as the commissioner of Shantipur Municipality for 40 years, and was its vice-chairman for three years. For 30 years, he was a member of the Nadia District Board's Education Committee and was an honorary magistrate of the district for 20 years.

== Journalism and writings ==
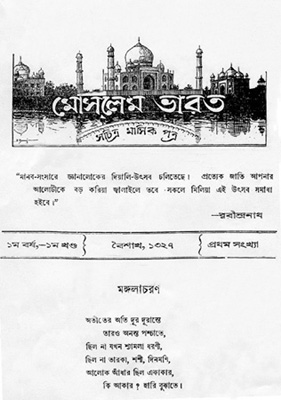
The Moslem Bharat was a monthly literary journal. Its editor and executive editors were Huq and his son Afzalul Huq respectively.

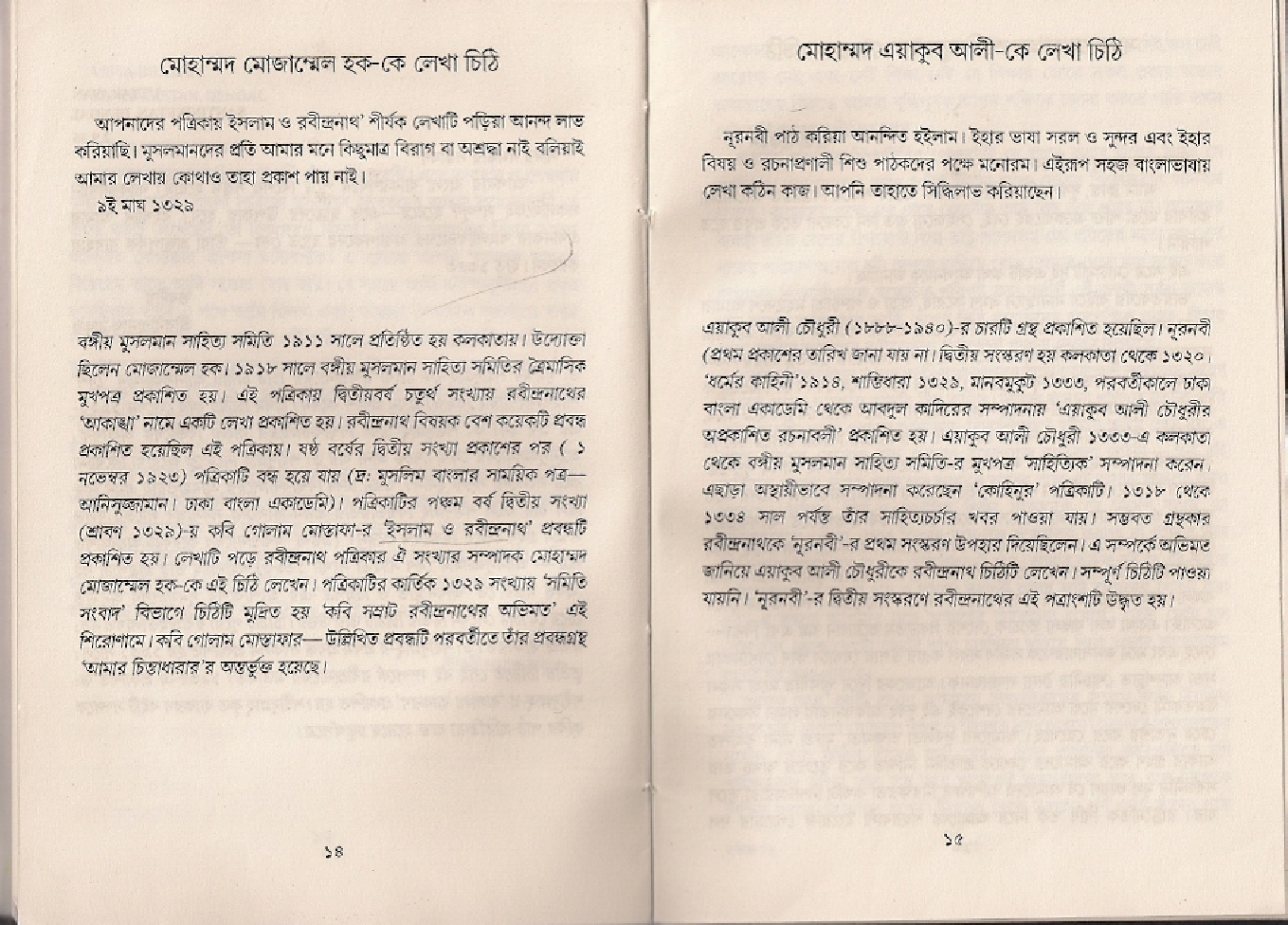
A letter sent to Huq from Nobel laureate Rabindranath Tagore after the release of the Islam and Rabindranath article by Golam Mostofa of the Bengal Muslim Literary Society.

Huq's poetic talent was evident from his childhood days, though he excelled more in prose. He translated the Persian epic Shahnama into Bengali in 1901. Among his novels are Zohra and Daraf Khan Gazi. His career in writing officially began as a journalist for the Calcutta Weekly Samay. He published and edited for several magazines throughout his lifetime such as the Lahari (1899), Mudgal, Shantipur Deepika, Bishwadoot, Jubak, Naoroz and the Monthly Shantipur. However, the most notable magazine was The Moslem Bharat (1920). Huq was also the vice-president of the Bengal Muslim Literary Society, from where he developed a friendship with Qazi Nazrul Islam and Nobel laureate Rabindranath Tagore, both of whom wrote articles for the society. The Calcutta-based Bangiya Sahitya Parishat later conferred the title of Kavyakantha upon Huq.

Some of his works include:

=== Poetry ===
- Bengali: কুসুমাঞ্জলি, romanized: Kushumanjali (1881)
- Bengali: অপূর্বদর্শন, romanized: Apurbadarshan (1885)
- Bengali: প্রেমহার, romanized: Premahar (1898)
- Bengali: হজরত মহাম্মদ, romanized: Hazrat Muhammad (1903)
- Bengali: জাতীয় ফোয়ারা, romanized: Jatiya Foara (1912)
- Bengali: ইসলাম সঙ্গীত, romanized: Islam Sangit (1923)

=== Prose ===
- Bengali: মহর্ষি-মনসুর, romanized: Maharshi-Mansur (1896)
- Bengali: ফেরদৌসী-চরিত, romanized: Ferdausi-Charit (1898, dedicated to Mearajuddin Ahmad)
- Bengali: শাহনামা, romanized: Shahnama (1909)
- Bengali: তাপসকাহিনী, romanized: Tapaskahini (1914, 2nd ed)
- Bengali: খাজা ময়ীনউদ্দীন চিশতী, romanized: Khaja Muinuddin Chishti (1918)
- Bengali: হাতেমতাই, romanized: Hatemtai (1919)
- Bengali: টিপু সুলতান, romanized: Tipu Sultan (1931)
- Bengali: শান্তিপুরের রসলীলা, romanized: Shantipurer Rasleela

=== Novels ===
- Bengali: জোহরা, romanized: Zohra (1917)
- Bengali: দরাফ খান গাজী, romanized: Daraf Khan Gazi (1919)

== Family and death ==
He died on 30 November 1933 in Shantipur. Sir Azizul Haque was his eldest son.

== See also ==
- Ismail Hossain Siraji
- Kaykobad
