= Purba Pakistan Sahitya Sangsad =

Bengali literary society

- Formation: 1942
- Headquarters: Dhaka, Bangladesh
- Region served: Bangladesh
- Official language: Bengali

Purba Pakistan Sahitya Sangsad (East Pakistan Literary Society) was a literary society of Bengali Muslims created to encourage Muslim nationalism in favor of Pakistan. It was located in Dhaka, East Pakistan.

== History ==
Purba Pakistan Sahitya Sangsad was established in 1942 in Dhaka following the adoption of the Pakistan Resolution by the All India Muslim League. The same year the East Pakistan Renaissance Society was founded in Kolkata for similar reasons. The Purba Pakistan Sahitya Sangsad promoted Muslim nationalism and encouraged support for Pakistan. It wanted to create a literary culture that reflected Islamic traditions. It encouraged the use of loan words from Arabic, Persian and Urdu languages to use in Bengali Literature. The founding President was Syed Sajjad Husain and the secretary was Syed Ali Ahsan. It published a weekly journal Paksik Pakistan (Pakistan Fortnightly). The organization was active till the Partition of India in 1947. It declined with the growing disillusionment of Bengalis in the Pakistan state and ended after the 1952 Language movement.
