= The Moslem Bharat =

Literary journal in India (1920)

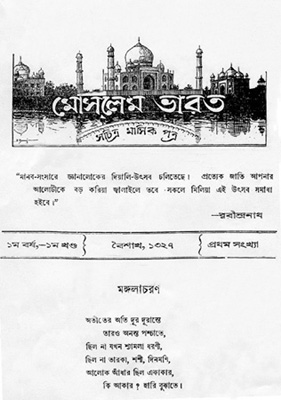

The Muslim Bharat (Bengali: মোসলেম ভারত) was a historic literary journal that published from Kolkata in the early 20th century. It published works by notable Bengali authors and poets; such as Abanindranath Tagore, Kalidas Roy, Kaikobad, Qazi Imdadul Haq, Kazi Abdul Wadud, Kumud Ranjan Mullick, Mohitlal Majumdar, Mohammad Barkatullah, Satyendranath Dutta, Sheikh Fazlul Karim, and Syed Emdad Ali.

== History ==
The Muslim Bharat started publication from Kolkata in 1920 as a literary magazine. The founding editor of the magazine was Mohammad Mozammel Huq. Huq's son, Afzalul Huq, was the managing editor of the magazine. Despite having Muslim in the title, the magazine had a secular policy and featured a line by Rabindranath Tagore on its front page. The magazine also published works by non-Muslim authors. The magazine kept Kazi Nazrul Islam on a retainer and published many of his early works including his first novel, Bandhan-Hara. His famous poem Birodhi was published in 1921.
