= Pangsha Upazila =

Pangsha পাংশা
- Upazila
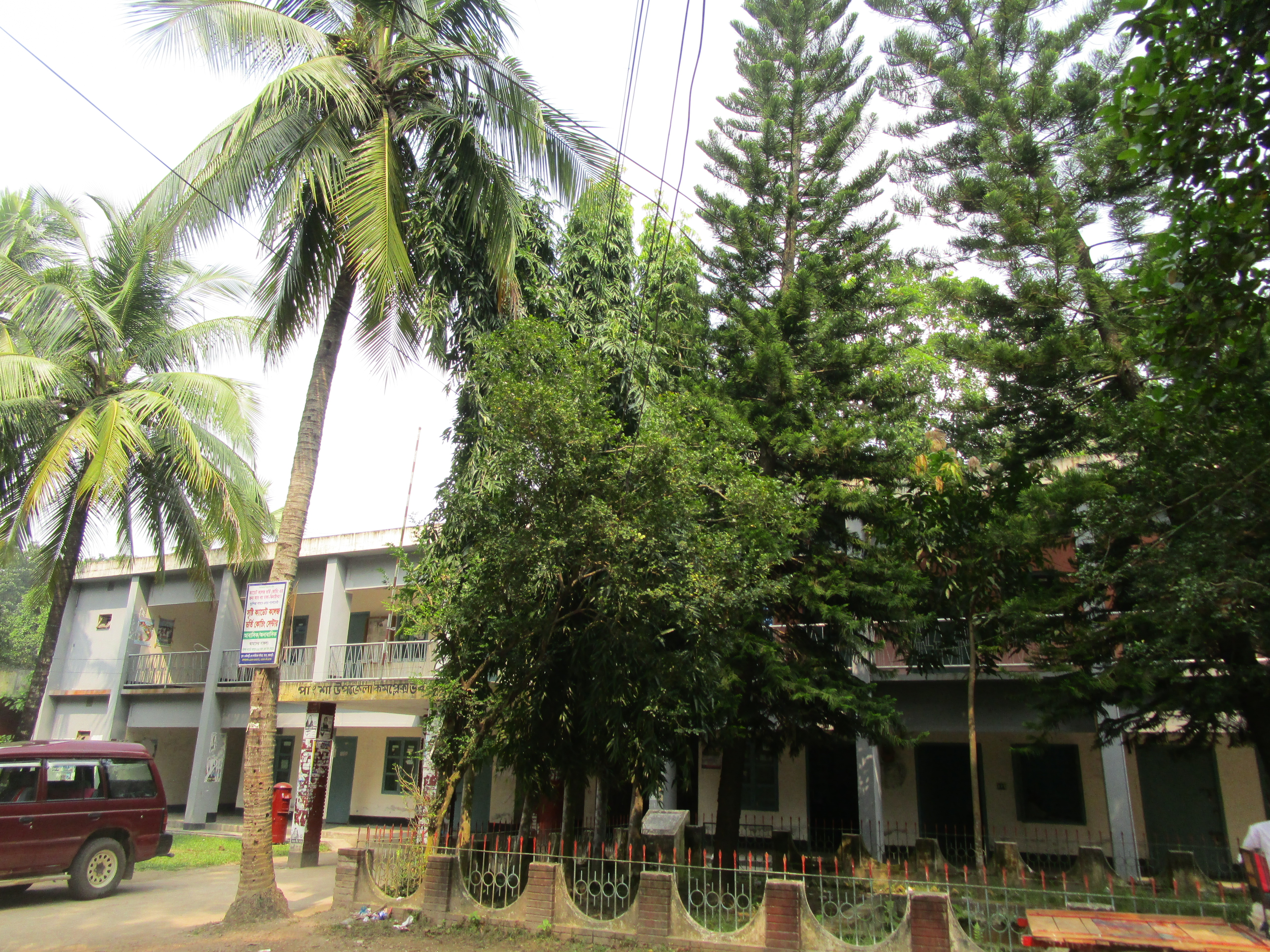
- Pangsha Upazila Complex

- Coordinates: 23°47.5′N 89°25′E
- Country: Bangladesh
- Division: Dhaka
- District: Rajbari
- Headquarters: Pangsha

Area
  - Total: 250.31 km^{2} (96.65 sq mi)

Population (2022)
  - Total: 274,110
  - Density: 1,095.1/km^{2} (2,836.2/sq mi)
- Time zone: UTC+6 (BST)
- Postal code: 7720
- Area code: 06424
- Website: pangsa.rajbari.gov.bd

Pangsha Upazila mauza geocode map

Pangsha (Bengali: পাংশা) is an upazila of Rajbari District in the division of Dhaka, Bangladesh.

== Geography ==
Pangsha is located at 23.7917°N 89.4167°E. It a total area of 250.31 km^{2}.

== Demographics ==
Religions in Pangsha Upazila (2022)
Religion	Percent
Islam	93.15%
Hinduism	6.85%

According to the 2022 Bangladeshi census, Pangsha Upazila had 69,643 households and a population of 274,110. 9.51% of the population were under 5 years of age. Pangsha had a literacy rate (age 7 and over) of 65.91%: 66.50% for males and 65.34% for females, and a sex ratio of 96.77 males for every 100 females. 41,627 (15.19%) lived in urban areas.

As of the 2011 Census of Bangladesh, Pangsha upazila had 56,336 households and a population of 207,086. 55,759 (26.93%) were under 10 years of age. Pangsha had an average literacy rate of 48.3%, compared to the national average of 51.8%, and a sex ratio of 999 females per 1000 males. 32,949 (13.54%) of the population lived in urban areas.

According to the 1991 Bangladesh census, Pangsha had a population of 316,752, of whom 151,566 were aged 18 or older. Males constituted 51.78% of the population, and females 48.22%. Pangsha had an average literacy rate of 23.1% (7+ years), against the national average of 32.4%. mashhpara 23.75/89.36. Bagduli High School. Pangsha Rajbari Maurat latitude 23.47 longitude89,25

== Administration ==
Pangsha Upazila is divided into Pangsha Municipality and ten union parishads: Babupara, Bahadurpur, Habashpur, Jashai, Kalimahar, Kasbamajhail, Machhpara, Mourat, Patta, and Sarisha. The union parishads are subdivided into 162 mauzas and 192 villages.

Pangsha Municipality is subdivided into 9 wards and 21 mahallas.

== Notable people ==
- Mohammad Abu Hena, Chief Election Commissioner of Bangladesh
- Kaushik Ali Chowdhury, Bengali essayist
- Rowshan Ali Chowdhury, journalist

== Gallery ==
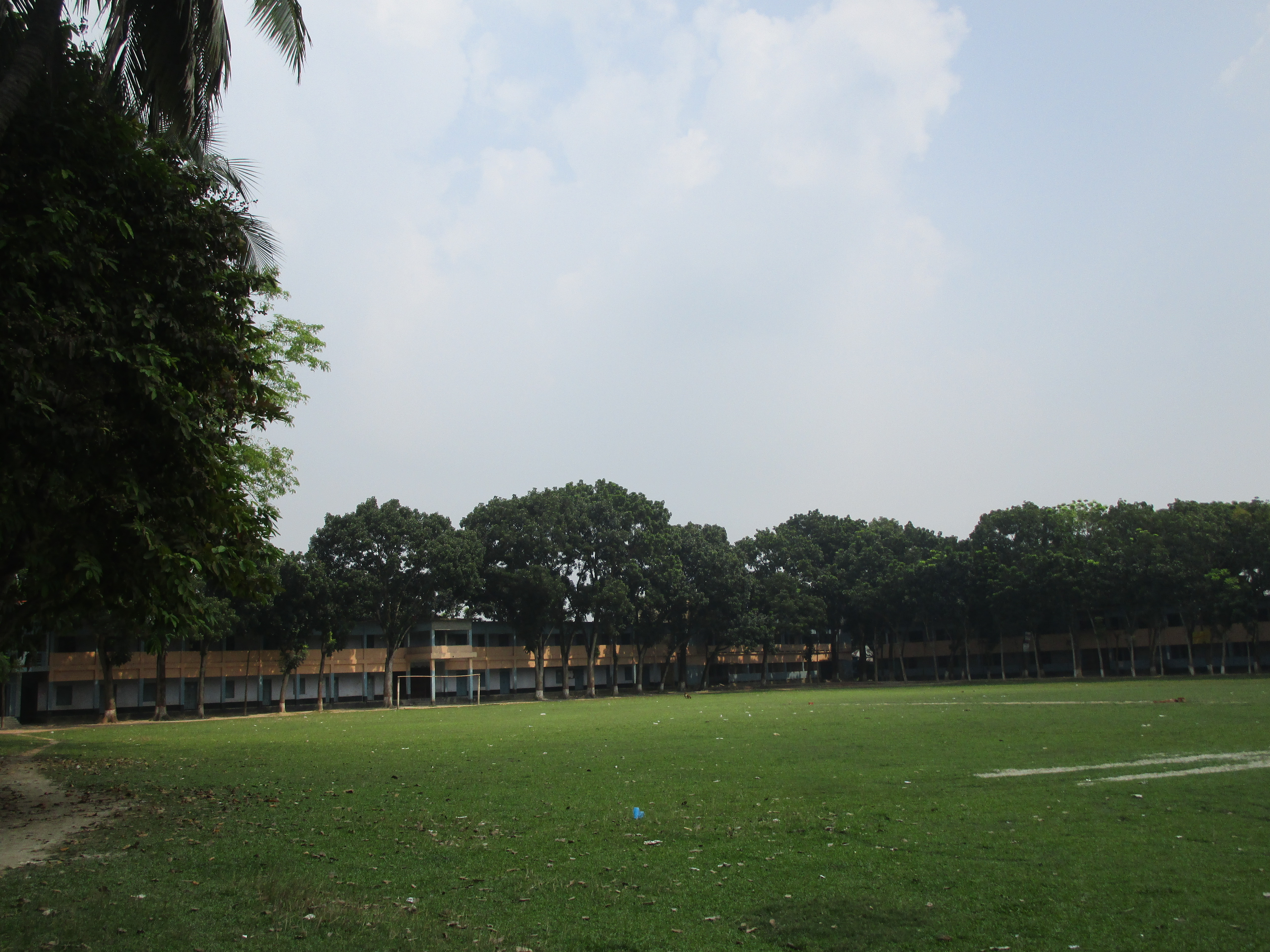
Pangsha Govt. College Campus.

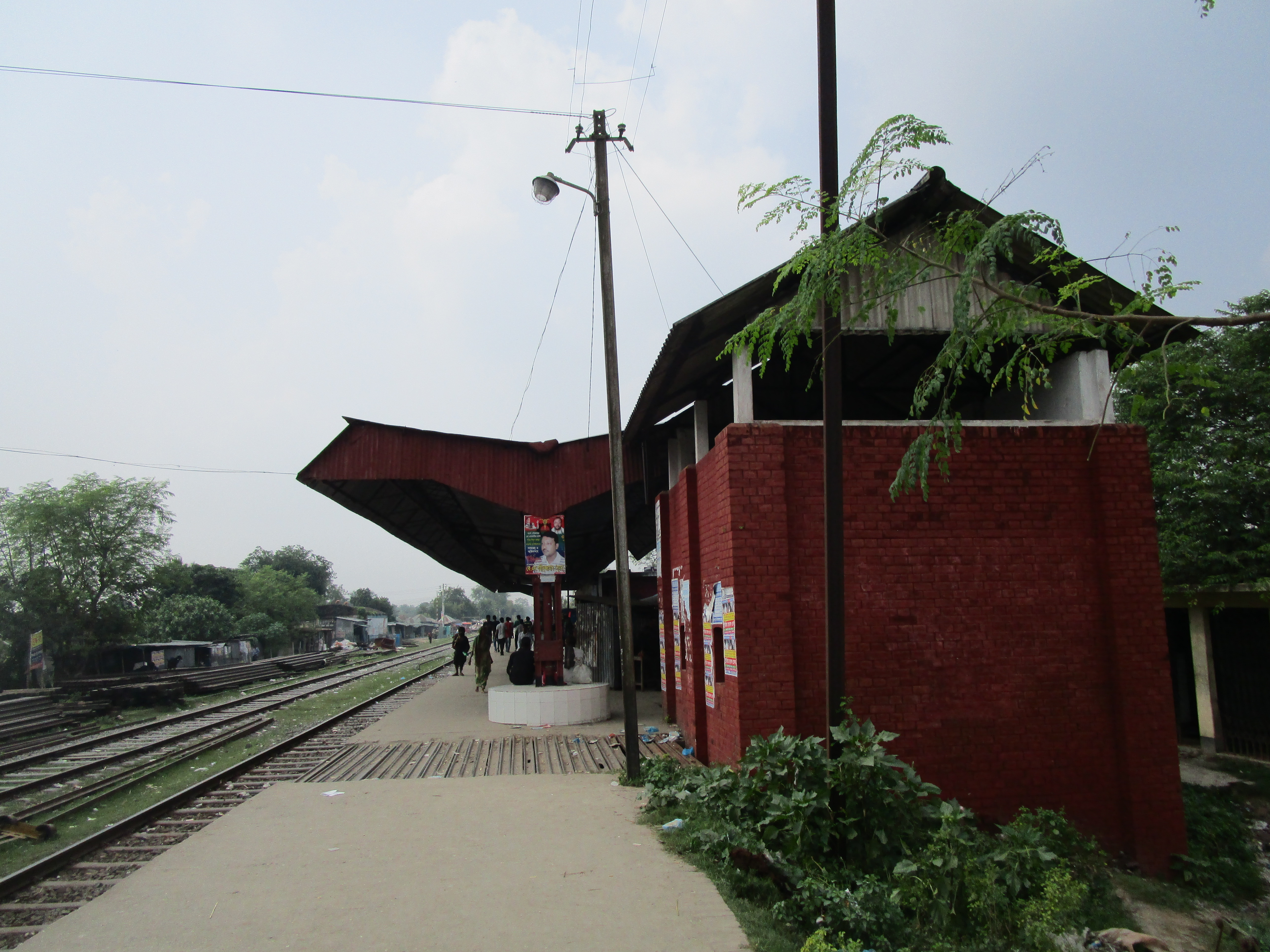
Pangsha Railway Station.

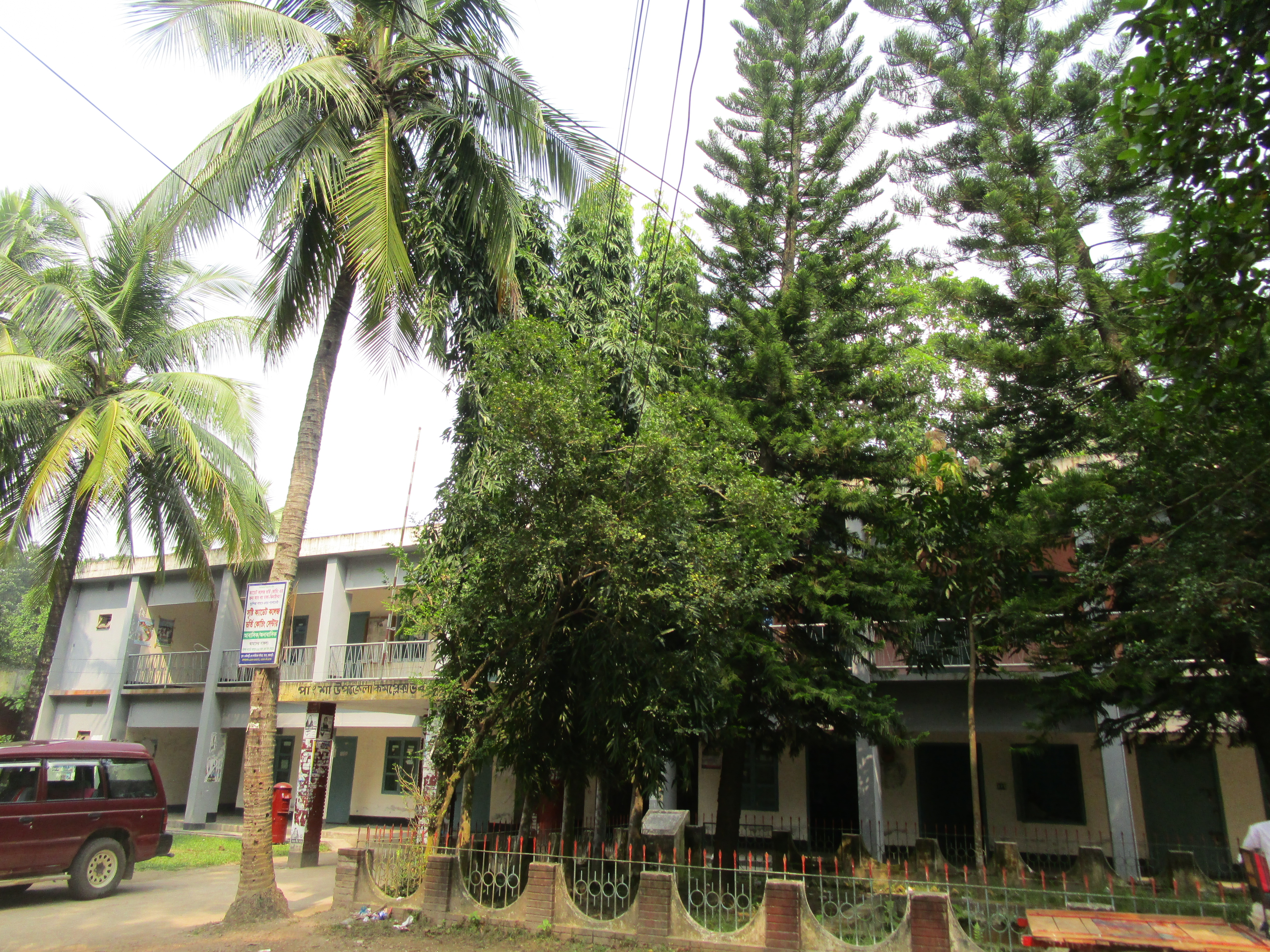
Pangsha Upazila Complex building.

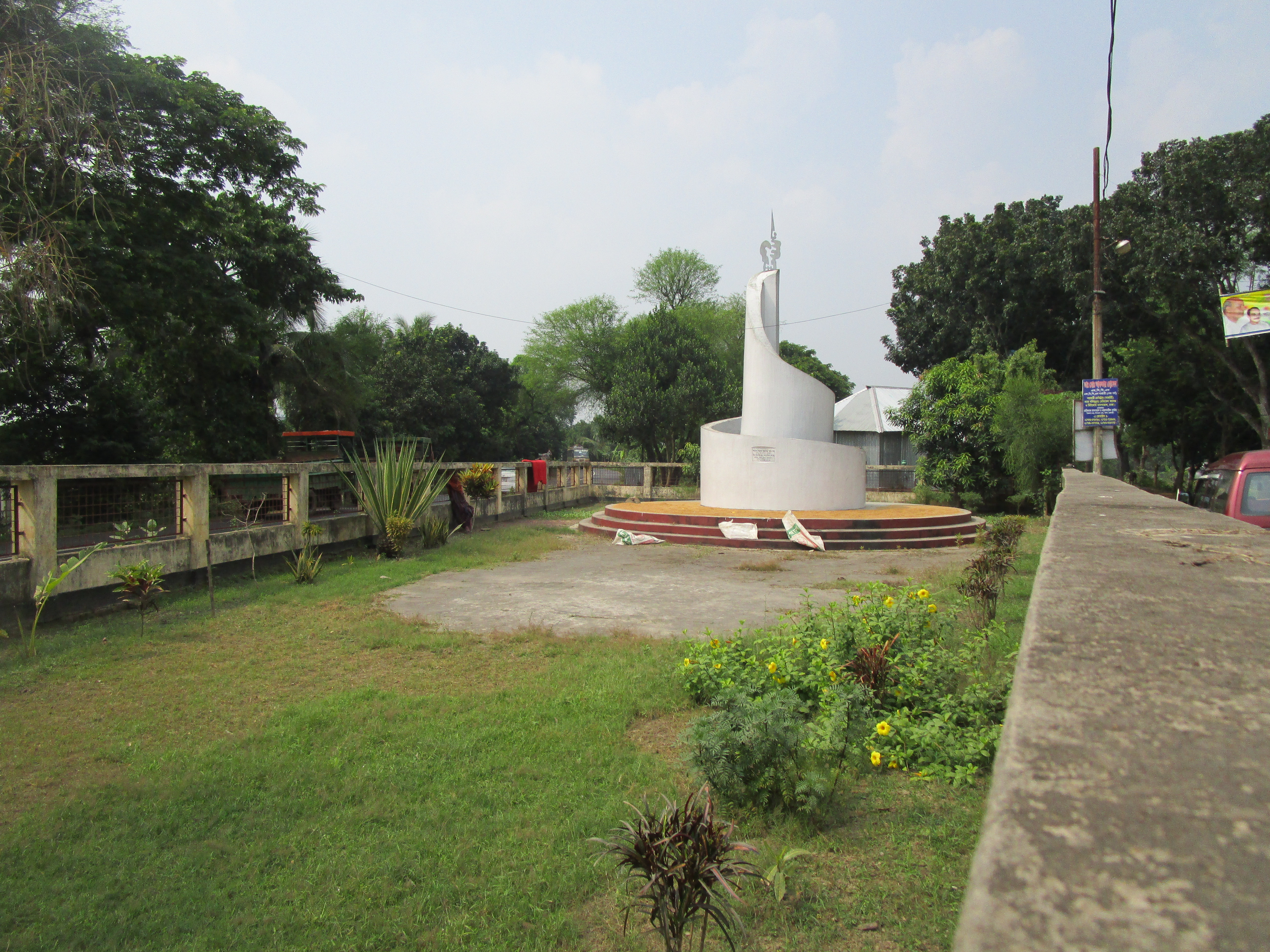
The 1971 war monument at Pangsha Upazila

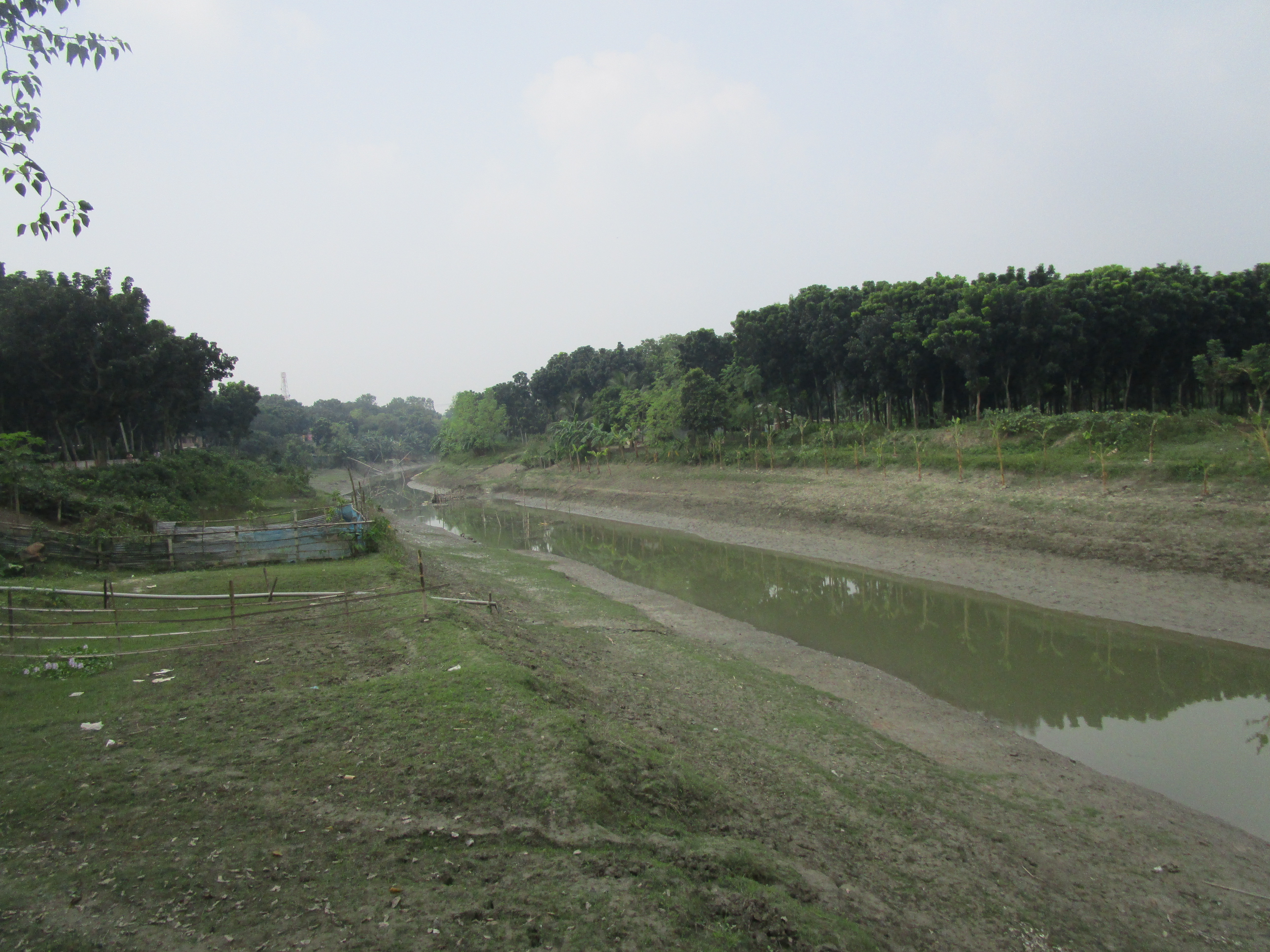
Chandana River at Pangsha.

== See also ==
- Upazilas of Bangladesh
- Districts of Bangladesh
- Divisions of Bangladesh
