= Mujibur Rahman Khan =

Bangladeshi journalist and politician (1910–1984)

- Born: 23 October 1910; Uluyati village, Netrokona District, Bengal Presidency, British India
- Died: 5 October 1984 (aged 73); Dhaka, Bangladesh

Mujibur Rahman Khan (23 October 1910 – 5 October 1984) was a Bangladeshi journalist, litterateur and politician.

== Education and career ==
Khan passed the Entrance examination from Anjuman High School in 1928 and Bachelor of Arts in 1934 from Ananda Mohan College in Mymensingh. He then enrolled in the Department of English at Calcutta University but left without completing his master's degree.

== Career ==
Mujibur Rahman became a headmaster at Harua High School in 24 Parganas.

=== Journalism ===
Khan was associated with All Bengal Anti-Fascist Writers' Guild, Bangiya Mussalman Sahitya Samiti, East Pakistan Renaissance Society, Pakistan Arts Council and Bulbul Lalitakala Academy. He was the first president of East Pakistan Press Club which is today National Press Club.

=== East Pakistan Renaissance Society ===
At a meeting held on 30 August 1942 at the office of Brngai-language newspaper the Azad, in Kolkata, the East Pakistan Renaissance Society was established to promote the idea of a separate Muslim state comprising the Muslim majority areas of India on the basis of the Lahore Resolution. Abul Kalam Shamsuddin, Habibullah Bahar Chowdhury and Mujibur Rahman Khan became its founders. In 1944, Mujibur Rahman Khan published a booklet, Eastern Pakistan: Its Population, Delimitation and Economics along with Dr M. Sadeq, a professor of economics at Islamia College. This contained a description of the government, economy, population, geographic boundary, and security of a future state of East Pakistan. The society held its first meeting in July 1944. Khan was also elected to the first Constituent Assembly of India in 1946.

== Works ==
- Bilate Pratham Bharatbasi (1939)
- Pakistan (1942)
- Eastern Pakistan: Its Population, Delimitation and Economics (1942)
- Sahityer Simana (1974)
- Sahitya O Sahityik (1971)
- Mahanabi (1980)
- Amader Itihas
- Sahityer Buniyad

== Awards ==
- Sitara-i-Quaid-e-Azam
- Ekushey Padak (1980)
