= The Mohammadi =

Art journal

The Mohammadi was a Bengali language monthly art journal. It was founded by Mohammad Akram Khan, who worked as its editor.

== History ==
The Mohammadi was founded in August 1927 in Kolkata, Bengal Presidency, British Raj by Mohammad Akram Khan. The purpose of the Ahmadi was to shape a unique literary culture of Bengali Muslims. It was supportive of the two-nation theory of Mohammed Ali Jinnah. It closed down for a while and reopened in 1937. It supported Pakistan and the partition of India. It moved to Dhaka, East Pakistan, after the partition of India. Muhammad Wajed Ali served as its editor for a while.

Its first issue in Dhaka was published in December 1949. It was edited by Mujibur Rahman Khan. A number of issues were edited by Akram Khan and Badrul Anam Khan. The magazine published stories by Bengali Muslim authors like Sufia Kamal, Shawkat Osman, Abdullah Al-Muti Sharafuddin and Alauddin Al Azad. Because of its pro-Pakistan and Muslim position, the magazine opposed Bengali nationalism. Its last issue was published in 1970, one year before the independence of Bangladesh.
