= Ismail Hossain Siraji =

Bengali writer

Syed Ismail Hossain Siraji Ghazi-e-Balqan
- সৈয়দ ইসমাইল হোসেন সিরাজী
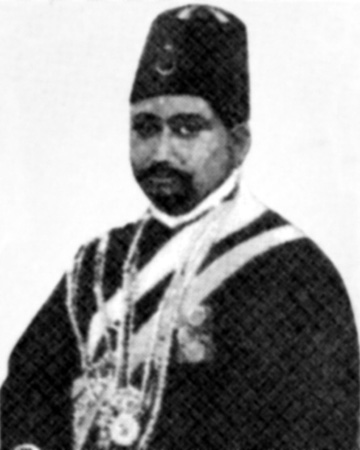
- Born: 13 July 1880; Banikunja, Diardhangara, Sirajganj, Pabna District, Bengal Presidency
- Died: July 17, 1931 (aged 51); Bengal Presidency
- Education: Jnanadayini Minor English School.
- Writing career
- Language: Bengali language

Syed Ismail Hossain Siraji (Bengali: সৈয়দ ইসমাইল হোসেন সিরাজী; 1880–1931) was a Bengali author and poet from Sirajganj in present-day Bangladesh. He is considered to be one of the key authors of period of the Bengali Muslim reawakening; encouraging education and glorifying the Islamic heritage. He also contributed greatly to introducing the Khilafat Movement in Bengal, and provided medical supplies to the Ottoman Empire during the Balkan Wars. Anal-Prabaha, his first poetry book, was banned by the government and he was subsequently imprisoned as the first South Asian poet to allegedly call for independence against the British Raj. The government issued Section 144 against him 82 times in his lifetime.

== Early life ==
Syed Ismail Hossain was born on 13 July 1880 to a Bengali Muslim family in Sirajganj, Pabna District, Bengal Presidency. Siraji's father, Moulvi Syed Abdul Karim Khandakar (1856–1924), was a police sub-inspector and Unani practitioner. His mother, Nur Jahan Khanom, was of Pashtun ancestry. The suffix Siraji was added to the end of his pen name in honour of his home district.

As a young boy, Ismail Hossain Siraji learnt Arabic and Persian in the local primary school, before going on to study at the Jnanadayini Minor English School. As his family was not well-off, Siraji could not afford to go to college. Nevertheless, Siraji studied Sanskrit grammar, literature and dictionaries at home. He also read the works of Indian Muslim writers like Shibli Nomani and Muhammad Iqbal, whom he was greatly influenced by.

== Career ==
Siraji was a royal by day and writer by profession, who later immersed himself in the politics of Bengal and reawakening Bengali Muslim society, which had fallen behind as a result of colonial rule. Gaining a renowned reputation as an orator, Siraji advocated for Hindu–Muslim unity in addition to Muslim interests. At the age of nineteen, he published Anal-Prabaha (1899), his first book of poetry. During the Partition of Bengal in 1905, he called on Muslims to join the anti-Partition agitation. A second edition of his first book was published in 1908, and allegations of rebellion were charged against him. The book was banned by the government and he was subsequently imprisoned in March 1910 as the first South Asian poet to allegedly for independence against the British Raj.

In 1912, Siraji joined a delegation providing medical aid to the Ottoman forces during the Balkan Wars. Returning to Bengal the following year, he became one of the founders of the Anjuman-i-Ulama-i-Bangala (which would later become the Jamiat Ulema-e-Bangala branch of the Jamiat Ulema-e-Hind in 1921). In 1930, he was arrested for partaking in the Civil Disobedience Movement.

He was also active in many parties and organisations like the Indian National Congress, the All-India Muslim League, Swarajya Party and Krishak Samiti. Siraji mobilised peasants of Sirajganj against the local zamindars (feudal lords).

== Works ==
Siraji was a regularly writer for The Kohinoor. He also wrote for the pro-Ottoman monthly Islam Pracharak as well as Al-Eslam, Nabajug, Prabasi, Nabanoor, Saogat, Soltan and The Mohammadi. His works focused on awakening the disadvantaged Bengali Muslim society by glorifying the Islamic tradition, culture and heritage and advocating for both modern education and traditional Islamic learning.

=== Poems ===
- Anal Prabaha (1899, then 1908)
- Akangkha (1906)
- Uchchhas (1907)
- Udbodhan (1907)
- Naba Uddipana (1907)
- Spain Bijoy Kabya (1914)
- Sangit Sanjibani (1916)
- Premanjali (1916)
- Mahashikhkha Mahakabya (vol-1 1969, vol-2 1971)

=== Novels ===
- Ray Nandini (1915)
- Tara Bai (1916)
- Feroza Begum (1918)
- Nooruddin (1919)
- Ami Je Tomar (1917)

=== Travelogue ===
- Turoshko Bhromon (1913)

=== Essays ===
- Stri Shikkha (1907) - advocating for Muslim women's education
- Sajati Prem (1916)

== Death and legacy ==
Siraji died on 17 July 1931, in the Bengal Presidency, sixteen years before independence. On 5 March 1948, Huseyn Shaheed Suhrawardy said:

He single-handedly set out on the hardest path of not allowing a dormant nation to be tarnished and awakening the sleeping nation to [its] past glory. When we were young, his Anal-Prabaha electrified [our] bloodstream.

He left behind a wife, five sons and two daughters. His janaza was performed by Qazi Moulvi Matiur Rahman. He influenced the next generation of Bengali Muslim writers such as Muhammad Enamul Haq and Sahityaratna Mohammad Najibar Rahman. In 1967, Abdul Quadir edited Sirajir Rachanabali (Essays of Siraji). Dr Kazi Abdul Mannan also did research on Siraji, publishing "Syed Ismail Hossen Siraji" in 1970.
