= Shamik Ghosh =

Indian author writing in Bengali (born 1983)

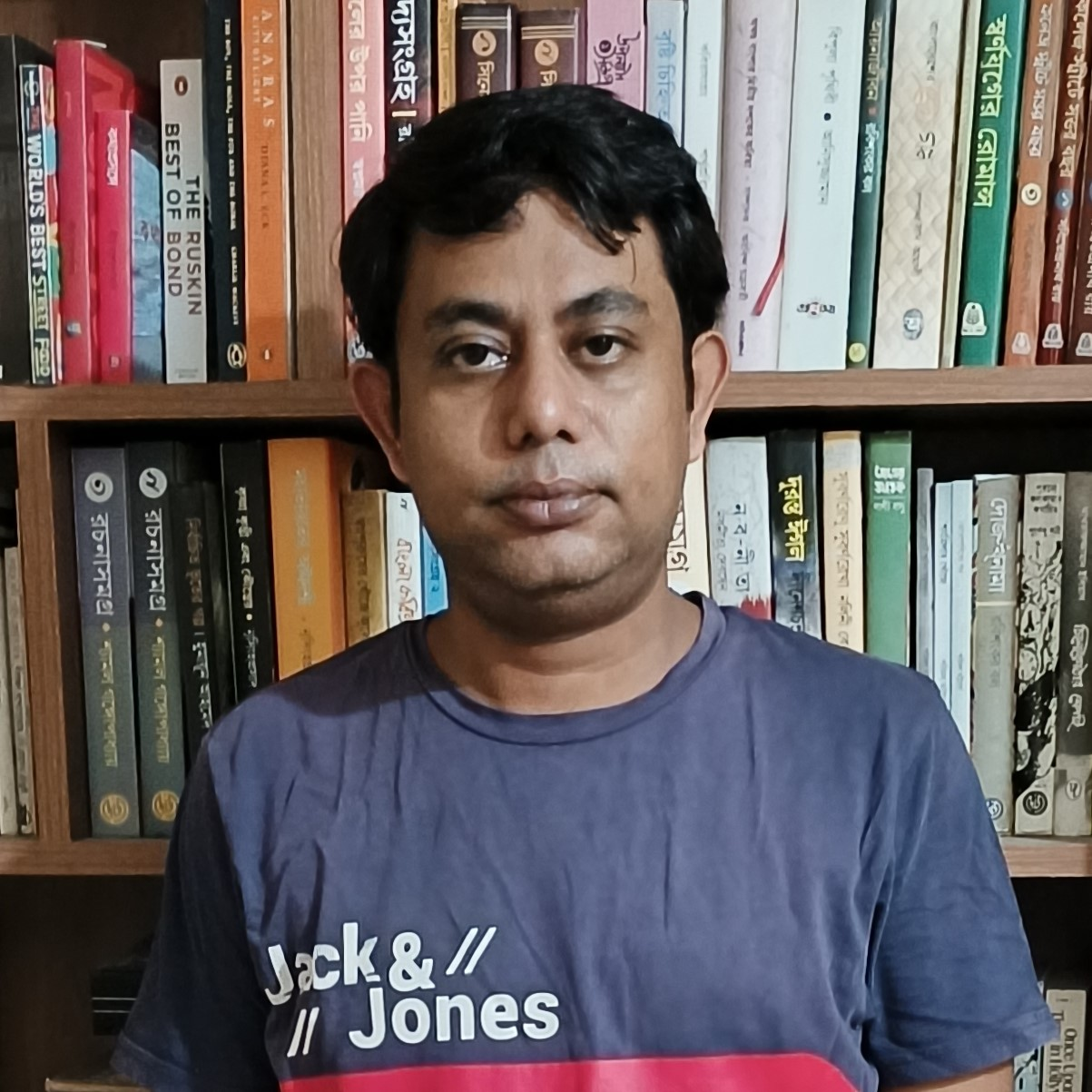
- Born: 16 January 1983 (age 43); Kolkata, West Bengal, India
- Citizenship: Indian
- Occupation: Writer
- Known for: Sahitya Akademi Yuva Puraskar Awardee Bengali Writer
- Awards: Yuva Puraskar 2017 Ila Chanda Smriti Puraskar 2017 Somen Chanda Smriti Smarok 2019

Shamik Ghosh (Bengali: শমীক ঘোষ born 16 January 1983) is an Indian author writing in Bengali. He has won the prestigious Sahitya Akademi Yuva Puraskar (Indian National Academy of Letter's Youth Prize) in 2017 in Bengali for his debut short story collection "Elvis O Amolasundari" His shorty 'Half Timer Pawre' from the collection was selected by Hervill Secker, an imprint of Vintage, Penguin Random House, U.K for the Harvill Secker Young Translators’ Prize 2018. The story was published in Granta online He has been awarded the Ila Chanda Smriti Puraskar by the oldest literary Institution of India, Bangiya Sahitya Parishad. and Somen Chanda Smriti Smarok by West Bengal Bengali Academy in 2019.

== Early life ==
Shamik Ghosh was born in Kolkata, West Bengal India to University Professor father Alok Kumar Ghosh and mother Dipika Ghosh. His family moved from Jessore of present-day Bangladesh during the Partition of India. Shamik spent his early childhood in a mixed locality surrounded by slums and befriended slum children. He studied in one of the best schools of Kolkata, South Point High School and as such was exposed to people from varied sections of the society from an early age.

Shamik did his undergraduate studies in physics from Calcutta University. He was involved in politics in his university days. His debut short story Ghola was published in prestigious Bengali Literary Magazine Desh at this time.

After graduation, Shamik joined a Private Sector Bank in Kolkata. After a small stint he moved and joined another PSU Bank and was posted in Ahmedabad and then went to Mumbai in the Corporate Strategy and Communication Department of the same Bank. As a Corporate Communication professional he had access to the upper reaches of Mumbai and yet, the trains he traveled on, journeyed through some of the poorest urban areas of India. He decided to take up writing once again. His second short story, a decade after the first, got published in a Bengali daily. In 2014, Shamik left his job and returned to Kolkata to concentrate on writing and film-making.

== Literary style ==
The writing of Shamik Ghosh is characterized by short sentences, vividly visual description and continuous changes of time and space. Some argue that he delves into postmodern fiction. He doesn't believe in the normal interpretation of reality and wants to bend reality to reveal unseen elements of our own hidden self. He speaks about loners in the society, each unique with a distinct marginality.

== See also ==
- List of Bengali-language authors (alphabetical)
- List of Yuva Puraskar winners for Bengali
