= The Kohinoor =

Bengali language newspaper

The Kohinoor কোহিনূর
- Editor: Rowshan Ali Chowdhury
- Staff writers: Rowshan Ali Chowdhury; Abdullah Al-Mamun Suhrawardy; Ismail Hossain Siraji; Maniruzzaman Islamabadi; Mir Mosharraf Hossain; Yakub Ali Chowdhury
- Categories: Islamic culture, Bengali culture
- Frequency: Monthly
- Founder: Rowshan Ali Chowdhury
- Founded: 1898
- First issue: June 1898; 126 years ago
- Final issue: 1912
- Country: Bengal Presidency (British Raj)
- Based in: Kushtia, Pangsha, Calcutta
- Language: Bengali

The Kohinoor (Bengali: কোহিনূর, romanized: Kohinūr, lit. 'Mountain of light') was a Bengali language newspaper, first published in July 1898. Initially focusing on miscellaneous topics such as Islamic culture, its third relaunch was a pivot of Hindu-Muslim harmony. The paper targeted both Hindu and Muslim clientele.

== History ==
The Kohinoor started publication in July 1898 in Kushtia District after Rowshan Ali Chowdhury met Mir Mosharraf Hossain. During its initial years, publication was irregular and lasted for about a year. It resumed publication in April 1904 and promoted harmony between Muslims and Hindus; the two largest religious groups in Bengal. On that same year, it also criticised the Urdu-speaking elite who looked down upon the Bengali language due to a superiority complex. This second phase lasted up until around 1907. It made another comeback in April 1911 continuing on for another year.

== Location ==
The newspaper moved its headquarters from Kushtia to Pangsha (then part of Faridpur District). It was edited by Mohammad Rowshan Ali Chowdhury, a resident of Pangsha. It later relocated to Calcutta.

== Members ==
Rowshan Ali Chowdhury was the founder and chief editor of The Kohinoor. It was managed by a 35-member committee containing both Muslims and Hindus. Ismail Hossain Siraji, Maniruzzaman Islamabadi and Abdullah Al-Mamun Suhrawardy regularly contributed to the magazine. In early 1914, Yakub Ali Chowdhury wrote an article relating to the language and literature of Bengali Muslims.
