= Anjuman-i-Ulama-i-Bangala =

Association of Muslim religious leaders in Bengal

- আঞ্জুমান-ই-উলামা-ই-বাঙ্গালা
- Abbreviation: AUB (আউবা)
- Named after: Ulama of Bengal
- Merged into: Jamiat Ulema-e-Hind
- Formation: 1913
- Founder: Abul Kalam Azad, Maniruzzaman Islamabadi, Mohammad Akram Khan, Muhammad Abdullahil Baqi, Muhammad Shahidullah
- Founded at: Calcutta, Bogra
- Dissolved: 1921
- Type: Islamic
- Legal status: Religious organisation
- Origins: Islam in Bengal
- Region served: Bengal
- Official language: Bengali, Arabic

Anjuman-i-Ulama-i-Bangala (Bengali: আঞ্জুমান-ই-উলামা-ই-বাঙ্গালা Assembly of the Scholars of Bengal), was an association of Muslim religious leaders in British India's Bengal Presidency. It later formed a branch of the Jamiat Ulema-e-Hind by the name Jamiat Ulema-e-Bangala in 1921.

== History ==
The association was established in 1913 in Beniapara, Bogra. The first president and secretary of the Anjuman was Mohammad Akram Khan with Maniruzzaman Islamabadi as joint secretary. Ismail Hossain Siraji was also a notable member of the organisation. Aiming to bring about Muslim unity, regardless of sects, and prevent Muslims from converting to Christianity.

The association published the periodical Al-Islam, edited by Mohammad Akram Khan and Maniruzzaman Islamabadi. Notable writers for the paper included Begum Rokeya and Fazlul Hoque Selbarsi. Over 1500 copies were in circulation. It contained articles on history, literature, philosophy, and cultural heritage.

Two years later, they held a conference in Calcutta.

== Aims ==
Its aims included providing Islamic education, countering hostility and misconceptions preached by Christian missionaries as well as reforming and uniting Muslim society to an orthodox fashion through the Quran and Sunnah. This included actively educating unlettered and illiterate Muslims of Bengal and Assam about shirk and bidʻah. At the same time, the organisation promoted Hindu–Muslim unity. Many maktabs, madrasas, bayt al-mal and social arbitration boards were founded and funded by the organisation; bringing about solidarity and a strong morale amongst Muslims. They popularised the use of the Bengali language amongst the Muslim middle-class. There was also an aspiration of establishing an Islamic university in Chittagong although this never came into being.

== Members ==
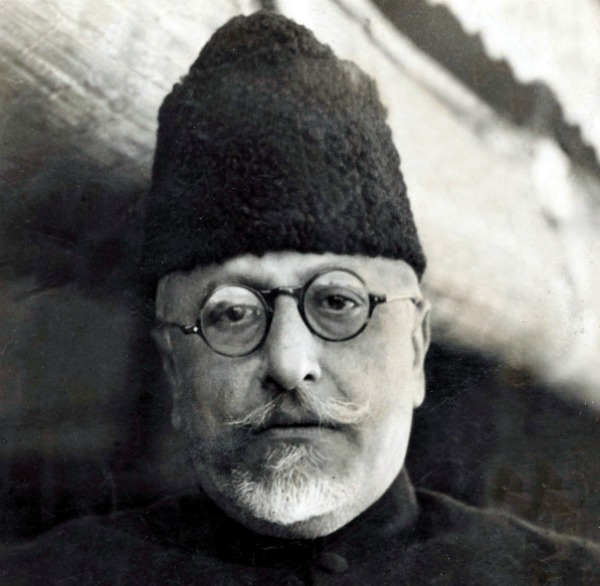
Abul Kalam Azad

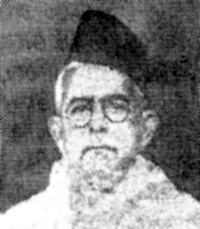
Mohammad Akram Khan

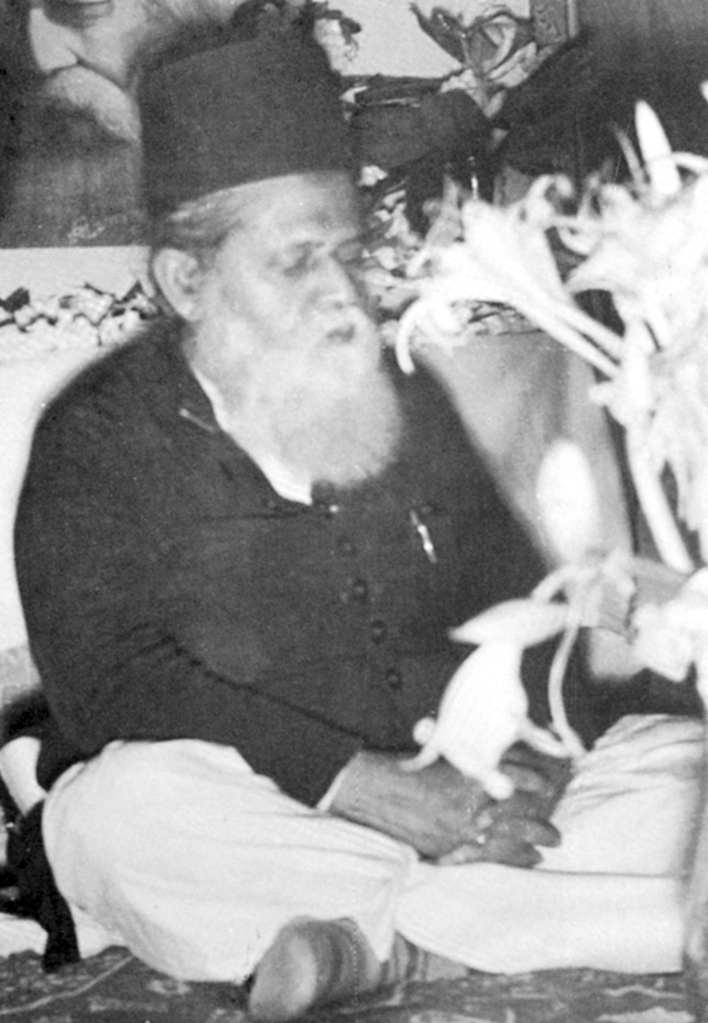
Muhammad Shahidullah

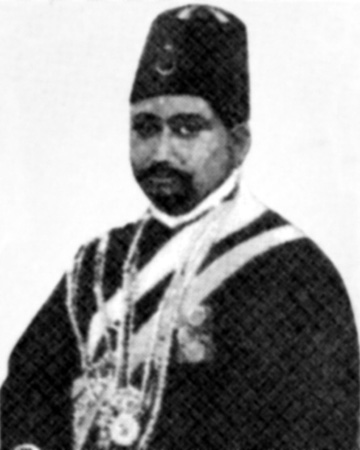
Ismail Hossain Siraji

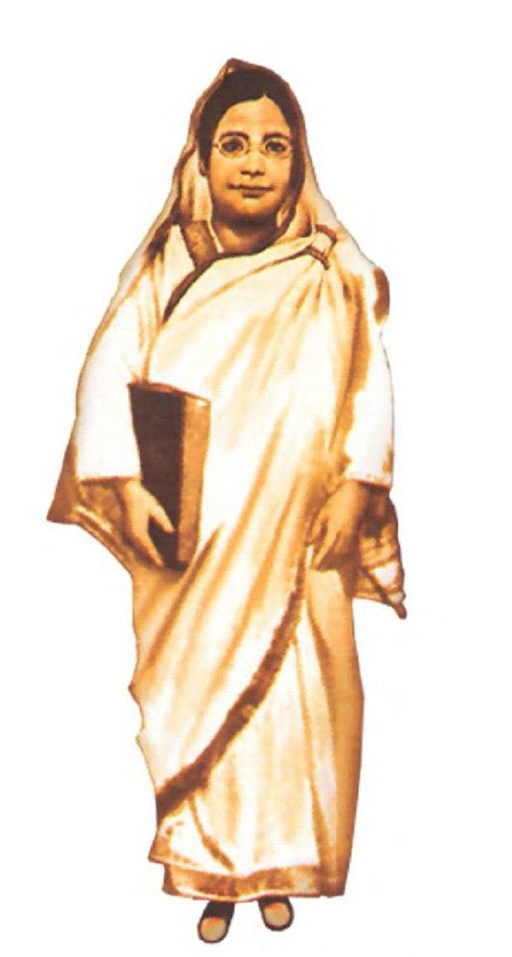
Begum Rokeya

== See also ==
- Faraizi Movement
- Muharram Rebellion
- Titumir
