= Yakub Ali Chowdhury =

Bengali essayist and journalist (1888–1940)

- এয়াকুব আলী চৌধুরী
- Born: 2 November 1888; Faridpur, Bengal Presidency, British India
- Died: 15 December 1940 (aged 52); Faridpur District, Bengal Presidency, British India
- Occupation: Essayist
- Father: Enayetullah Chowdhury
- Relatives: Rowshan (brother); Awlad (brother); Rokanuzzaman Khan (grandnephew)

Mohammad Yakub Ali Chowdhury (2 November 1888 – 15 December 1940) was a Bengali essayist and journalist. He was noted as one of the few Bengali Muslim literary scholars of his time.

== Early life ==
Chowdhury was born on 2 November 1888 in the village of Maguradangi in Pangsha into the aristocratic Bengali Muslim Chowdhury family of Greater Faridpur. His father was Enayetullah Chowdhury, a policeman by profession. His elder brother was Rowshan Ali Chowdhury, a politician and journalist, and his younger brother was Awlad Ali Chowdhury, also a journalist. After completing his primary education at Pangsha Middle English School, he then enrolled at the Raja Surya Kumar Institution in Rajbari, where he passed his entrance exam. He then moved on to studying at the Presidency College, Kolkata, for four years before his studies came to an end due to eye problems.

== Career ==
Chowdhury started teaching at the Zorwarganj English High School in Mirsharai Thana in 1914. The following year, he worked as the assistant teacher at the Raja Surya Kumar Institute. He taught at George High School in Pangsha in 1918. He was involved with the Indian National Congress and was imprisoned from 1920 to 1921 for his active involvement in the Khilafat Movement (being the ringleader for the Pangsha area) and Non-cooperation movement, resulting in him losing his career as a teacher.

Chowdhury then moved to Kolkata, joining his younger brother Awlad. He served as a founding member and later secretary of the Bangiya Mussalman Sahitya Samiti. He edited the association's magazine with Golam Mostofa from January 1927. He also contributed to The Kohinoor, which was edited by his brother, Rowshan. Most of Yakub Ali Chowdhury's essays were based on Islam, its teachings and philosophy, as well as Islamic culture and Hindu–Muslim unity. He was also noted to have been a strong advocate of Bengali as the language of Bengali Muslims. as opposed to Urdu, during the nationwide controversy between the 1920s to 1930s.

== Death and legacy ==
Suffering from severe financial hardship and tuberculosis, he spent his last days in his home village and died on 15 December 1940. Writer Abdul Quadir compiled his essays into a single work titled Yāqub Alī Chaudhurī Rachanābalī in 1963. Chowdhury's works were also included in Kazi Abdul Wadud's Shashwata Banga. In 1985, an institution in Pangsha was founded and named as Yakub Ali Chowdhuri Bidyapith. His literary works were included in the curriculum of school level, secondary, higher secondary. and graduation level Bengali literature in Bangladesh.

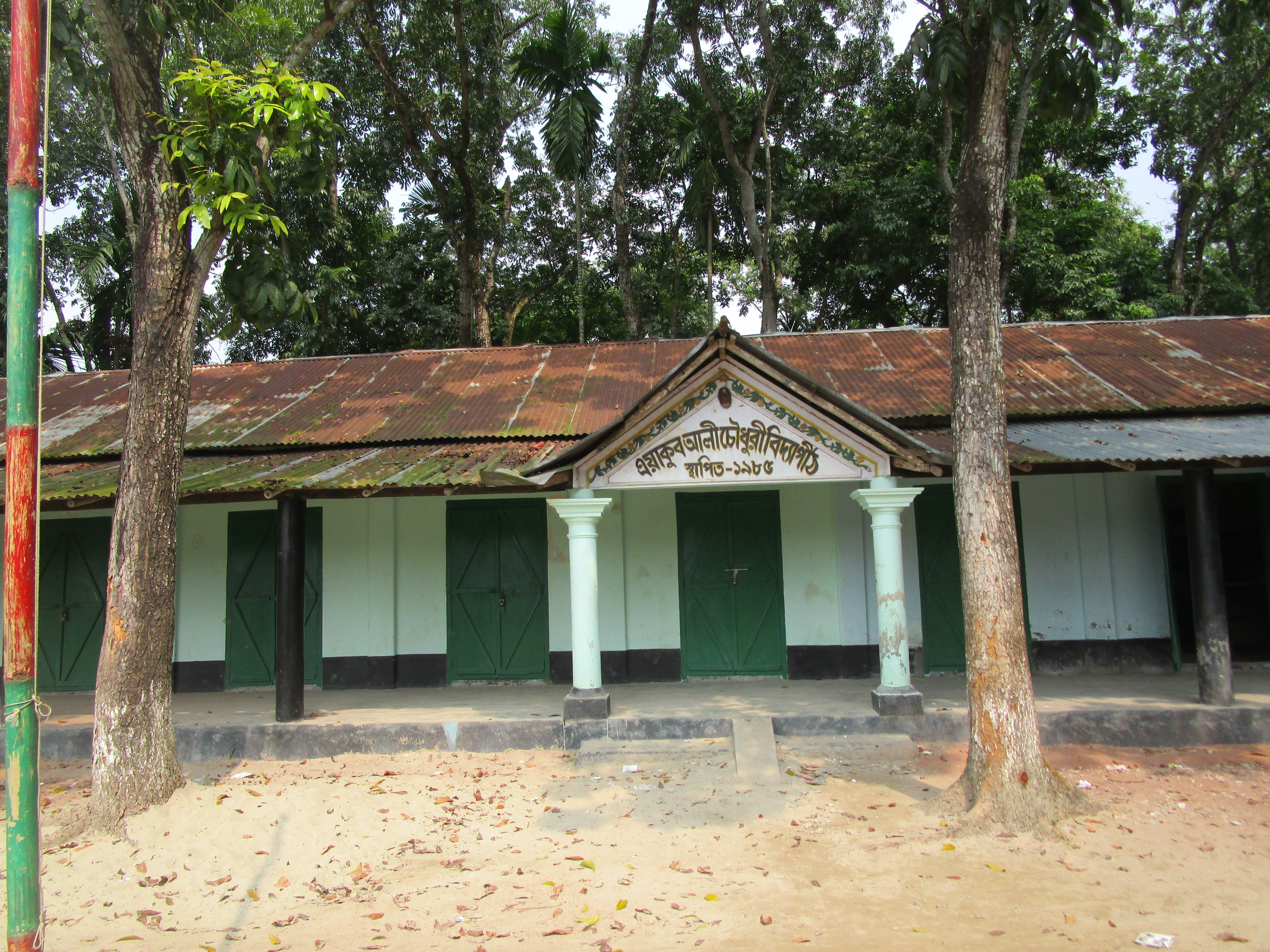
A high school at Pangsha, Rajbari District, Bangladesh, named after the essayist.

== Essay collections ==
- Bāngālī Musalmāner Bhāshā O Shāhitya The Kohinoor (Jan/Feb 1914)
- Dharmer Kāhinī (1914) [Religious instruction for Muslims]
- Nūrnabī (1918) [Book on the life of Muhammad for children]
- Shāntidhārā (1918) [Essay on the glory of Islam]
- Mānab Mukuṭ (1926) [Book on the life of Muhammad's life and teachings]
