= Jagadish Gupta =

Indian poet, novelist and short story writer

- Born: Jagadish Chandra Sengupta; 5 July 1886; Kushtia, Bengal Presidency, British India (now in Bangladesh)
- Died: 15 April 1957 (aged 70); Calcutta, West Bengal, India
- Spouse: Charubala Sengupta
- Writing career
- Language: Bengali
- Genres: novel, short story, poem
- Notable works: Asadhu Siddhartha, Binodini, Udaylekha, Meghabrito Ashani, Dulaler Dola, Nishedher Patabhumikay, Loghu Guru.

Jagadish Gupta (5 July 1886 – 15 April 1957) was an Indian poet, novelist and short story writer. Known for his realistic view of life, strange character portrayal and unique narrative style, he was one of the major exponents of modern Bengali literature.

Born as Jagadish Chandra Sengupta in Kushtia, Bengal Presidency, he studied in Calcutta and later took up work as a 'job-typist' at the Judge's Court in Seuri. He also worked at Executive Engineer's office in Sambalpur, Orissa, at Patna High Court and at Bolpur Chawki Adalat as a typist. After retirement from his job, he settled in Calcutta. The Government of India granted him a 'Distinguished Man of Letters Allowance' in 1954.

Gupta's stories had been published in periodicals like Bharati, Bijoli, Uttara, Kali-Kalam and Kallol. His first novel Asadhu Siddhartha was published in 1928. Some of his other notable works include Binodini, Udaylekha, Meghabrito Ashani, Dulaler Dola, Nishedher Patabhumikay, Loghu Guru etc.

== Life ==
Jagadish Gupta was born at Kushtia, Nadia district (now in Kushtia District, Bangladesh) to Kailash Chandra Sengupta and Saudamini Devi. His birth name was Jagadish Chandra Sengupta which he never used in his literary career. He was born in July 1886; but the exact date of his birth is unknown. As a child Gupta went to the village pathshala (primary school) run by Ramlal Saha. Later he came away to Calcutta and was admitted into City Collegiate School from where he passed Matriculation Examination in 1905 and admitted to the Ripon College (now Surendranath College). He started writing poems in this time. After passing First Arts Examination, he started learning stenography and typing. He married Charubala Sengupta of Osmanpur, Nadia in 1906. He gave up his studies at Ripon College in 1907 and he took up a job as a 'job-typist' at Seuri District Judge's Court in 1908. That was not a regular salaries job but he would be paid remuneration against the work he did. In 1912, he was appointed as a regular salaried typist in the office of the Executive Engineer in Sambalpur, Orissa. In 1918, he took up the job of a salaried typist at Patna High Court but resigned from the job in 1924 and vowed never to take up a job again though his financial condition compelled him to take up a typist's job in Bolpur Chowki Adalat in 1927. In 1944, he retired form his job and left Bolpur to settle in Calcutta where he stayed at the house of Kshitish Gupta at the Lake Market area. In 1950, he shifted to his own house at Jadavpur and started bringing up a girl named Sukumari. In 1954, the Government of India granted him a 'Distinguished Man of Letters Allowance' of Rupees 150 which was later reduced to Rupees 75. He died of a head injury in his Calcutta residency on 15 April 1957.

== Works ==
Jagadish Gupta started his writing career as a poet and later, became a famous short story writer.

=== Poems ===
Jagadish Gupta started his literary career as a poet. He contributed poems to journals like Uttara, Prabasi, Bharatbarsha and Sonar Bangla. He had written many poems throughout his life, but little of these were published. He did not represent the Anti-Tagore movement of modern Bengali poetry, which was the trend of his times, although he imitated none. His first Collection of poems, Akshara was published in 1932. Kashyap o Surabhi, a collection of twelve narrative poems featuring Achyutananda, an ordinary man who expresses the poet's wishes and unfulfilled desires, is another notable work by Gupta. Many of his later poems appeared in the journals Hindu and Jugantar. His last published work Bishakto Bandar appeared in the annual autumnal issue of Jugantar. It is known that Gupta wished to publish another collection of poems titled Tulsi, but whether this collection was ever published is unconfirmed.

=== Short stories ===
Gupta's first short story Paying Guest appeared in Bijoli in 1904 and his first collection of stories, Binodini was published in 1927. Only nine of his collections of stories now survive: Udaylekha, Upayan, Pike Sri Mihir Pramanik, Binodini, Meghabrita, Ashani, Ruper Bahire, Shashanka Kabiraajer Stree, Srimati and Jagadish Guptar Swa-Nirbachita Galpa. "The stories he wrote on psychological themes", observes Chattopadhyay, "are as subtle as they are varied. Moreover he wrote stories based on some strange tendencies of human nature about which we are not always aware, and which are illuminated only by the light of subtle observation". He wrote one hundred and twenty five stories. Some of his notable stories are "Payomukham", "Chandrasurya Jatadin", "Asha o Ami", "Har", "Pike Sri Mihir Pramanik", "Ami o Debrajer Stree" etc.

=== Books ===
- Binodini
- Ruper Bahire
- Srimoti
- Swanirbachito Golpo
- Osadhu Sidhartho
- Dulaler Dola
