= Nabinkali Devi =

Indian sex worker and writer

- নবীনকালী দেবী
- Born: 19th century
- Occupations: Writer, sex worker
- Writing career
- Language: Bengali
- Years active: 1880s
- Genre: Erotic poetry
- Notable work: Kamini Kalanka (1886)

Nabinkali Devi was an Indian writer in Bengali language and sex worker, known for her erotic poem titled Kaminikalanka (1886). She was the daughter of a prominent Brahmin, married to an older man, abandoned at home, entered an extramarital relationship, and later became a sex worker. A review of her book appeared in the magazine Hindoo Patriot to which the Indian Mirror responded with criticism of Devi.

== Works ==
- Debi, Nabinkali (1886). Kamini Kalanka Ed. 2nd (in Bengali).
