= Abul Kalam Shamsuddin =

Bengali politician and journalist (1897–1978)

- আবুল কালাম শামসুদ্দীন
- Born: 3 November 1897; Trishal Upazila, Mymensingh, Bengal Presidency, British India
- Died: 4 March 1978 (aged 80)
- Education: Dhaka College; Surendranath College; University of Calcutta

Abul Kalam Shamsuddin (3 November 1897 – 4 March 1978) was a journalist, writer and politician.

== Early life ==
Shamsuddin was born on 3 November 1897 in Trishal in the Mymensingh district of Bengal. His father was Mohammad Shahedullah, a Jotedar (landlord). Shamsuddin graduated from Dhaka College in 1919. He then went to Ripon College (now Surendranath College) in Kolkata for his higher studies. In 1921 he took the Upadhi examination from Gudiya Suvama Vidyayatan. He participated in Khilafat and the Non-Cooperation Movement as a student.

== Career ==
=== Journalism ===
In 1922, Shamsuddin joined the daily Mohammadi as assistant editor. He also edited the weekly Moslem Jagat, The Musalman, the Daily Soltan, the weekly Mohammadi and Mashik Mohammadi. He joined the daily newspaper called The Azad in 1936. After the death of Khairul Anam Khan, Shamsuddin became editor of The Azad alongside Mujibur Rahman Khan from 1940 to 1962. He also was the editor of Daily Pakistan.

=== Politics ===
Shamsuddin first took an interest in politics after the Jallianwalla Bagh Massacre in Punjab. He was inspired by Mahatma Gandhi and joined the Indian National Congress. In 1927 he joined the Muslim League. During the 1940s, while working for The Azad, he began agitating for "Purba Pakistan" (পূর্ব পাকিস্তান), a Bengali term referring to a specific East Pakistan based upon Bengali Muslim culture. In doing so, he was often critical of the Indian National Congress, while supportive of Muhammed Ali Jinnah.

He took part in the Pakistan Movement after becoming the president of the East Pakistan Renaissance Society. He was the chairman of the Reception Committee of the Renaissance Society Summit at Kolkata in 1944.

In 1946 he was elected to the Central Legislative Council. Shamsuddin became a member of Language Committee of East Pakistan Government in 1949.

== Involvement in Language Movement ==
Shamsuddin played an important role during the Language Movement. At that time he was the editor of the leading daily The Azad which reported about the movement. On 22 February 1952 he resigned from the East Bengal Legislative Assembly to protest the police firing on a crowd the previous day. Azad also published a special evening edition on that day. The editorial that he wrote criticised the police for created massive excitement among the youth.

== Publications ==
Shamsuddin wrote a number of books. He along with some other Islamist writers formed a domestic literature society named Raonok. Shamsuddin was the secretary of this 21 member society of Islamist writers. Of his books, his autobiography Atit Jiboner Smriti is considered as his masterpiece. His other works include:

- Podojomi Ba Anabadi Jami (1938)
- Trisrota (1939), storybook
- Kharataranga (1953), novel
- Anabadi Jami, Bengali translation of Turgenev's Virgin Soil
- Drishtikon (1961), literary criticism
- Natun Chin Natun Desh (1965)
- Digvijayi Taimur (1965)
- Iliad (1967), Bengali translation of Homer's ancient Greek epic poem
- Palashi Theke Pakistan (1968), history
- Atit Diner Smriti (1968), autobiography

== Awards ==
Shamsuddin received a number of awards in Pakistan and Bangladesh. In Pakistan he was awarded the Sitara-i-Khidmat in 1961 and Sitara-i-Imtiaz in 1967. In 1969 during the revolution of people he protested against the government and renounced his awards for the cause. He received the Bangla Academy Literary Award in 1970. After the independence of Bangladesh, he was honoured with the Bangladesh's highest honour, Ekushey Padak, in 1976.
