= Sufia Kamal =

Bangladeshi poet and activist (1911–1999)

- সুফিয়া কামাল
- Born: Syeda Sufia Begum; 20 June 1911; Shayestabad, Backergunge District, Eastern Bengal and Assam
- Died: 20 November 1999 (aged 88); Dhaka, Bangladesh
- Occupations: Poet, writer
- Spouses: Syed Nehal Hossain (m. 1922; died 1932) Kamaluddin Ahmed (m. 1939; died 1977)
- Children: Sultana Kamal (daughter)
- Awards: Full list

Begum Sufia Kamal (20 June 1911 – 20 November 1999) was a Bangladeshi poet, feminist leader, and political activist. She took part in the Bengali nationalist movement of the 1950s and civil society leader in independent Bangladesh. She led feminist activism and was a president of Bangladesh Mahila Parishad. She died in 1999 and was the first woman to be given a state funeral in Bangladesh.

== Early life and family ==
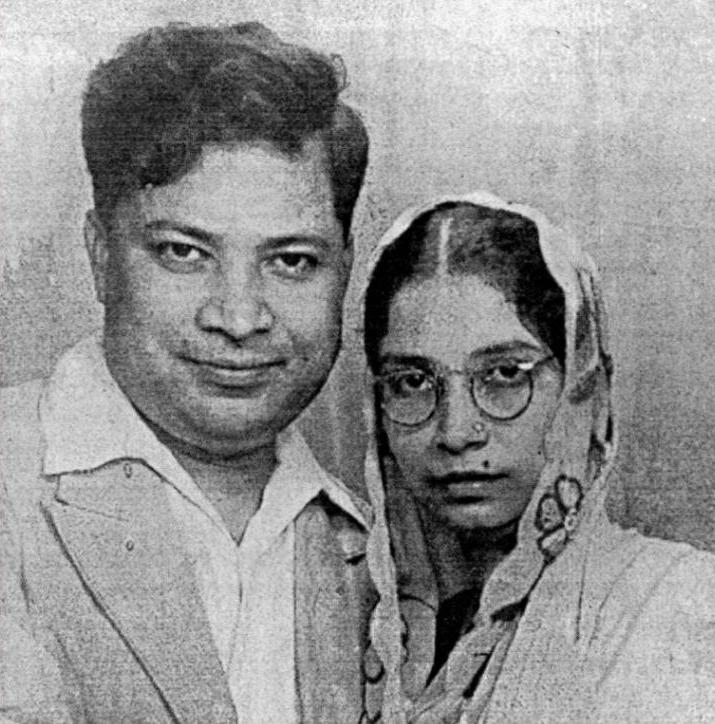
Sufia Kamal with her husband Kamaludddin Ahmed (1939)

Sayyida Sufia Begum was born on 20 June 1911, in her maternal home Rahat Manzil in Shayestabad, located in the Backergunge District of Eastern Bengal and Assam. Her paternal family were the zamindars of Shilaur in Brahmanbaria, and they claimed descent from Ali, the fourth Caliph of Islam. Whilst she was seven months old, her father Syed Abdul Bari left his job as a lawyer and became a Sufi ascetic, never returning home. She was raised by her mother, Sabera Begum, the youngest daughter of Nawab Mir Muazzam Hussain, in Shayestabad.

== Education ==
Begum's education began at the local maktab, where she learnt Arabic. As she grew older, she switched to home education as per the cultural norms. Her mother taught her how to read and write in Bengali. Through home education at the Shayestabad zamindar estates, she gained proficiency in Bengali, Arabic, and Hindustani. In 1918, she went to Kolkata with her mother where she came to meet with Begum Rokeya.

== Literary career ==
A short story Shainik Badhu which Begum wrote was published in a local paper in 1923. In 1925, Sufia met Mahatma Gandhi, which inspired her to wear simple clothing. Her first poem, Bashanti (Of Spring), was published in Saogat magazine in 1926. In 1931 she became the first Bengali Muslim female to be a member of the Indian Women Federation. In 1937, she published her first collection of short stories, Keyar Kanta (Thorns of the Keya Tree). Her literary career took off after her first poetry publication. Her first book of poems, Sanjher Maya (Evening Enchantment), came out in 1938, bearing a foreword from Kazi Nazrul Islam and attracting praise from Rabindranath Tagore.

== Personal life ==
At the age of eleven years, Sufia was married to her maternal cousin Mir Syed Nehal Hossain, a law student and the son of Mir Syed Motahar Hussain of Shayestabad. Hossain died in 1932, leaving behind a daughter, Amena Kahhar (1926–2014). Seven years later, Sufia married Kamaluddin Ahmed and subsequently moved to Barisal town. Kamal later had two other daughters, Sultana Kamal and Saeeda Kamal Tulu (1952–2026), and three sons Shahed Kamal, Shoeb Kamal (who went missing in 1971) and Sajed Kamal. Tulu was an artist. Shahed was a journalist and a faculty member of the University of Dhaka.

== Activism ==
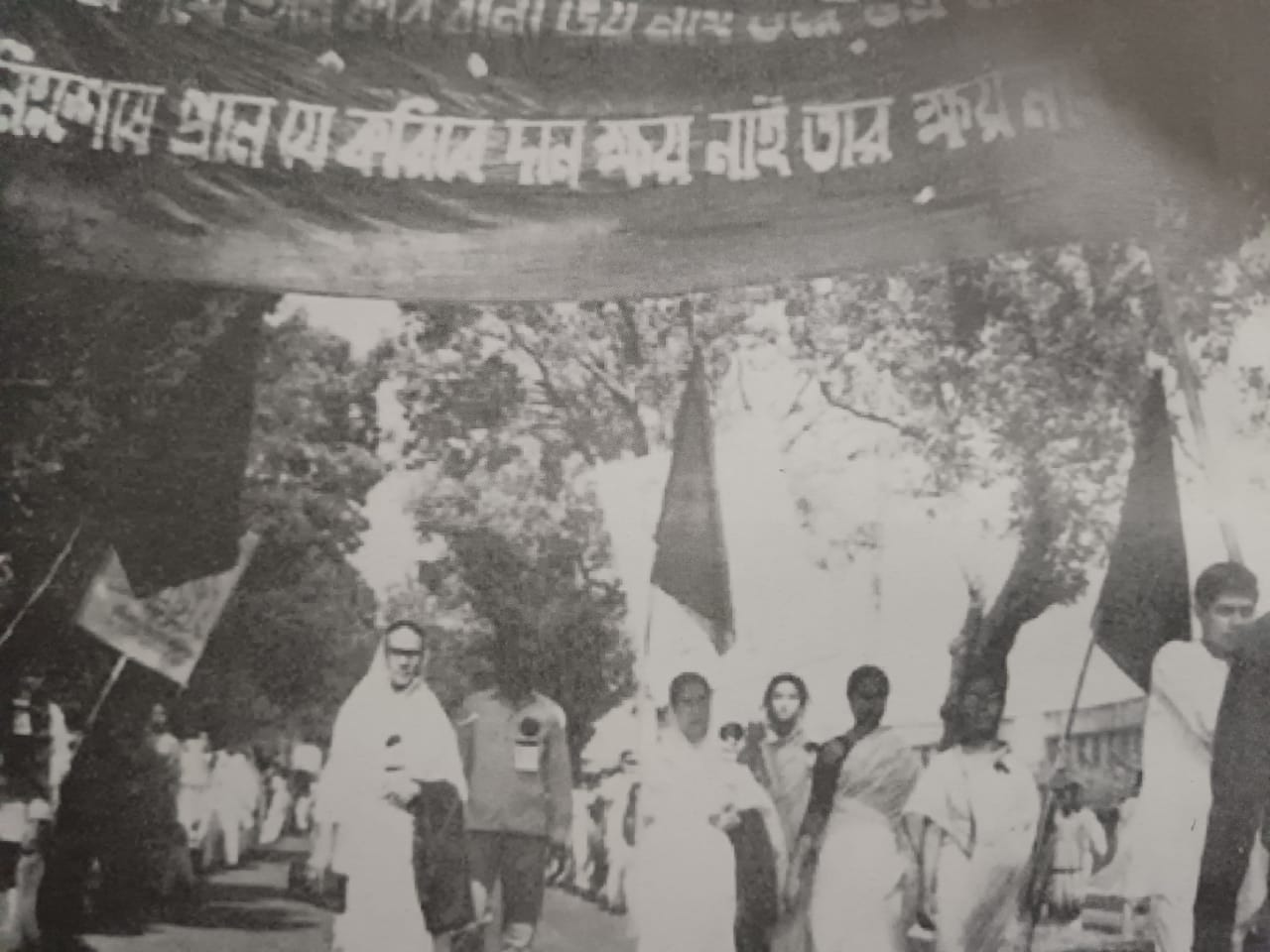
Kamal leading a procession during 1969 mass upsurge

In 1947, Kamal became the inaugural editor of the Begum weekly magazine specialized on women's issues which was published by Mohammad Nasiruddin. In October of that year after the partition of India she came to Dhaka. During a huge clash between Hindu and Muslim of that time Kamal worked for their friendship and joined in Peace Committee. In 1948, when Purbo Pakistan Mohila Committee formed, she became its chairman. Kamal's activism continued in 1952, with the Language Movement. In 1961, when the Pakistani government banned Rabindra Sangeet (Songs of Rabindranath), she became involved in the movement among Bengalis that ensued in 1961. During the mass uprising in 1969, which demanded the resignation of Pakistani military general Ayub Khan, she promoted the cause by forming Mohila Sangram Parishad (lit. 'Women's Struggle Group').

In later life, Kamal made women's rights her top priority and headed Bangladesh's largest women's organisation, Mahila Parishad, for many years. She did not see the oppression of women as mainly a class issue. She was also the first Chairperson of BRAC (1972–1980).

Kamal was instrumental in getting the first women's dormitory of the University of Dhaka to be named Rokeya Hall, after Begum Rokeya.

== Role in Bangladesh Liberation War ==
Kamal showed her bravery several times. Once Ayub Khan at a meeting with social elites of Dhaka, commented that ordinary people are like beasts and as such, not fit to be given franchise. Sufia Kamal at once stood up and remarked, "If the people are beasts then as the President of the Republic, you are the king of the beasts."

When the news of the 'killings' of Kamal and Dr Nilima Ibrahim by Pak Army after the crackdown on 25 March 1971 was broadcast on Akashbani, a radio station of the Indian state West Bengal, it drew criticism internationally and countries across the world put diplomatic pressure on the then Pakistani military government for clarification. The Pakistani government was forced to broadcast an interview with the poet on radio only to prove that Sufia Kamal was still alive.

Zillur Rahman, the then regional director of Radio East Pakistan, forwarded a paper to Kamal to sign with the statement "In 1971 no massacre took place in Bangladesh." When she refused, Rahman threatened, "If you don't give your signature then it might create a problem both for you and your son-in-law Abdul Quahhar Chowdhury." She told him that she didn't care for her life. She said, "I would rather die than put my signature on the false statement."

Kamal actively but secretly helped freedom fighters of the Liberation War. In 1971, several people in Dhaka including professor Ghyasuddin Ahmed and writer Shahidullah Kaiser collected medicine and food and delivered those to the posts of Sufia Kamal's house, from where the freedom fighters picked those up for their training outpost. From July 1971, she used to go to the hospital with food and medicine for the injured people of war. At that time there was an acute crisis of food and medicine in the hospital. She used to give food and medicine to certain rickshaw pullers at the Science Laboratory, Dhaka. They would take the food and medicine to the freedom fighters. She was able to establish closer contact with the freedom fighters such as Abul Barak Alvi, Shafi Imam Rumi, Masud Sadek Chullu and Jewel in August. As the Pakistani army kept their strong watch on her, she would try to help the freedom fighters in different ways ignoring the risks. Except Abul Barak Alvi, all others died in the hand of the Pakistani Army. The Pakistan Army and their collaborators killed Sufia Kamal's son-in-law, Kahar Chowdhury, because they were very angry with her. Early December 1971 Shahidullah Kaiser, Munier Chowdhury and Fazle Rabbi cautioned her to leave Dhaka but they themselves did not leave and got caught and later got killed.

== Awards ==
- Bangla Academy Literary Award for Literature (1962)
- Lenin Centenary Jubilee Medal (1970) from the Soviet Union
- Ekushey Padak (1976)
- Czechoslovakia Medal (1986)
- Jatyo Kabita Parishad Award (1995)
- Begum Rokeya Padak (1996)
- Deshbandhu CR Das Gold Medal (1996)
- Independence Day Award (1997)

== Works ==
- Mrittikar Ghran (The Fragrance of Earth)
- Ekatturer Diary (Diary of '71)
- Benibinyas Samay To Ar Nei (No More Time for Braiding Your Hair)
- Ekale Amader Kal (In This Time, Our Time)

== Recognition ==
The National Public Library in Dhaka is named the Sufia Kamal National Public Library in her honour. On 20 June 2019 Google celebrated her 108th birthday with a Google Doodle.
