= Mohammad Barkatullah (writer) =

Bangladeshi writer (1898-1974)

President of Bangla Academy
- In office 1962–1963
- Preceded by: Mohammad Akram Khan
- Succeeded by: Muhammad Qudrat-i-Khuda

Personal details
- Born: 2 March 1898 Ghorsal, Pabna District, Bengal Presidency
- Died: 2 November 1974 (aged 76) Dhaka, Bangladesh
- Occupation: Writer
- Awards: full list

Mohammad Barkatullah (2 March 1898 – 2 November 1974) was a Bangladeshi writer.

== Biography ==
Barkatullah was born on 2 March 1898 in the village of Ghorsal under Shahjadpur thana, which was part of Pabna district at the time. His father, Ali Azam, was a physician; his mother was Tosiron Bibi.

He matriculated from Shahjadpur High School in 1914 and completed an Intermediate of Arts at Rajshahi College in 1916. He earned a BA (Honours) in philosophy in 1918, an MA in philosophy in 1920, and a Bar-at-Law in 1922. Starting in 1916 and continuing through his student days, articles he wrote began to be published in various magazines and literary journals, including The Moslem Bharat.

In 1920, he married Jubeda Khatoon. They would have four sons and six daughters together.

He entered the Bengal Civil Service in 1923 and served in various capacities around Bengal while continuing to write.

His eldest daughter, Noor Jahan Begum, married Bengali astronomer Mohammad Abdul Jabbar on 8 June 1939.

Barkatullah was a deputy secretary of the education department of East Pakistan, later Bangladesh.

== Writing career ==
In Parasya Pratibha (The Talents of Persia), he praised the thinking of the Mutazilites in the eighth century, and described the literary, philosophical, and scientific advancements made possible over the succeeding four centuries by their independent spirit. Barkatullah's literary works were included in the curriculum of school level, secondary, higher secondary and graduation level Bengali Literature in Bangladesh.

=== Books ===
- Parasya Pratibha (The Talents of Persia) (1924 and 1932)
- Manuser Dharma (1934)
- Karbala O Imam Bangser Itihas (1957)
- Nabigrha Sangbad, Makka Khanda (1960)
- Naya Jatir Srasta Hazrat Muhammad (1963)
- Hazrat Osman (1968)
- Bangla Sahitye Muslim Dhara (1969)

== Awards ==
- Bangla Academy Literary Award (1960)
- Daud Prize (1960)
- Sitara-i-Imtiaz (1962)
- President's Award (1970)
