= Abu Jafar Shamsuddin =

- আবু জাফর শামসুদ্দীন
- Born: 12 March 1911; Gazipur, Eastern Bengal and Assam, British India
- Died: August 24, 1988 (aged 77)

Abu Jafar Shamsuddin (12 March 1911 – 24 August 1988) was a Bangladeshi writer. He was the recipient of Bangla Academy Literary Award in 1968 and Ekushey Padak in 1983.

== Early life and education ==
Shamsuddin was born on 12 March 1911, to a Bengali Muslim family of Bhuiyans in the village of Dakshinbagh, Gazipur District, eastern Bengal. His father, Muhammad Waqqas Ali Bhuiyan, was the son of Nadiruzzaman Bhuiyan, a disciple of Karamat Ali Jaunpuri. He started his education in a village school, and in 1924 he completed his junior madrasah examination. In 1929, he completed his high madrasah examination. He joined Dhaka College but did not graduate.

== Career ==
Shamsuddin joined the Daily Soltan as a sub-editor. He joined the political party of M. N. Roy, Radical Democratic Party. He went on to work as The Azad, The Daily Ittefaq, Purbadesh and The Daily Sangbad. He wrote Baihasiker Parshvachinta, a weekly column. In 1957, he joined the National Awami Party. He used the pseudonym Alpadarshi. He served as an assistant translator of the Bangla Academy from 1961 to 1972.

== Works ==
=== Novels ===
- Parityakto Swami (The Forsaken Husband, 1947)
- Mukti (Freedom, 1948)
- Bhaowal Gorer Upakhyan (The Stories of Bhaowal Gore, 1963)
- Padma Meghna Jamuna (1974)
- Sangkar Songkirton (Mixed Celebration, 1980)
- Proponcho (Manifestation, 1980)
- Deyal (Wall, 1985).

== Award ==
- Bangla Academy Literary Award (1968)
- Ekushey Padak (1983)
- Samakal Literary Award (1979)
- Muktadhara Literary Award (1986)
