= Mohammad Nasiruddin =

Bangladeshi journalist

- Born: 20 November 1888; Paikardi village, Chandpur district, Bengal Presidency, British India
- Died: 21 May 1994 (aged 105); Dhaka, Bangladesh
- Occupation: Journalist

Mohammad Nasiruddin (20 November 1888 – 21 May 1994) was a Bangladeshi journalist and progressive thinker. He became an important reformer of Muslim Bengal in early 20th century and provided platform for female writers. He received Ekushey Padak in 1977 and Independence Day Award in 1984 from the government of Bangladesh.

== Career ==
Nasiruddin published an illustrated literary magazine called Saogat on 2 December 1918. But due to financial constraints, its publication was kept suspended in 1922. Its publication was resumed in 1926 and since then it continued uninterruptedly until 1947. In 1926, he organized the Saogat Sahitya Majlis. He had published another illustrated weekly called Begum in 1946. After the India partition in 1947, he migrated to Dhaka, East Bengal, wherefrom the Saogat began to appear again regularly since 1954.

In 1985, Nasiruddin served as the first chairman of the trustee board of Nazrul Institute.

He was the father of leading women's rights leader Nurjahan Begum.

== Awards and honors ==
- Fellow of Bangla Academy Award (1975)
- Ekushey Padak (1977)
- Independence Day Award

Nasiruddin introduced the Nasiruddin Gold Medal after his name in 1976 to be awarded among the writers and journalists.
