= Shahadat Hussain =

- Born: 1894; Calcutta, Bengal Presidency, British India
- Died: 1953 (aged 59–60); 24 Parganas, West Bengal, India
- Occupation: Poet

Shahadat Hussain (1894–1953) was an Indian Bengali-language poet and writer.

== Biography ==
He was born in Chabbish Paragana in West Bengal, India. In 1915, Hussain entered in the writing world in Bani Sommiloni. In 1931, he said something in an Ein Omanno Andolon, a movement against British government at Kolkata and was sent to prison for three months.

== Works ==
Hussain was a poet, novelist, and playwright. Rabindranath Tagore was an influence was on him.

=== Poetry ===
- Mridongo
- Kolpolekha
- Rupochanda
- Modhuchanda

=== Novels ===
- Morur Kusum
- Hiron Rekha
- Parer Pothe
- Kheyatori
- Sonar Kakon
- Rikto
- Juger Alo
- Pother Dekha
- KataFul
- Shiri Farhad (a famous work)
- Laili Majnu (a famous work)
- Yousuf Julaykha (a famous work)

=== Dramas ===
- Sorforaj Khan
- Anar Koli
- Masnader Moho

=== For children ===
- Mohon Vog
- Cheleder Golpo
- Gulbadan
- Jahanara
