= Maniruzzaman Islamabadi =

Bengali activist, journalist and philosopher (1875-1950)

Maulana Maniruzzaman Islamabadi

Member of the Bengal Legislative Assembly
- In office 1937–1945
- Succeeded by: Ali Ahmed Chowdhury
- Constituency: Chittagong South-Central

Personal life
- Born: 1875 Patiya, Chittagong District, Bengal Presidency
- Died: 1950 (aged 74–75) Kolkata, India
- Political party: All-India Muslim League

Religious life
- Religion: Islam
- Denomination: Sunni

Munīruzzamān Khān Islāmābādī (Bengali: মনিরুজ্জামান খাঁন ইসলামাবাদী; 1875-1950), also known by the epithet Biplobi Maulana (Bengali: বিপ্লবী মাওলানা, lit. 'Revolutionary Maulana'), was a Bengali philosopher, nationalist activist and journalist from Islamabad (now known as Chittagong) in Bengal Presidency, British India (present-day Bangladesh). He was among the founders of the Jamiat Ulama-e-Hind.

== Early life ==
Maniruzzaman Khan Islamabadi was born into a Bengali Muslim family in Araliar Char village under Barama union in Patiya Upazila (present Chandanaish Upazila) of Chittagong district. As he became older, he taught at various traditional madrassas.

== Career ==
=== Journalism and writing ===
Islamabadi began his career as a journalist by editing or managing Muslim reformist periodicals such as the Soltan (1901), Hablul Matin (1912), and journals such as Mohammadi (1903), The Kohinoor (1911), Basona (1904) and Al-Eslam (1913). He organised literary conferences at Chittagong in 1922 and 1930 amidst pomp and grandeur. One such conference under the banner of "Chittagong Literary Society" was chaired by Rabindranath Tagore.

=== Political activism ===
Islamabadi's activism started in 1904 with the "Islam Mission Samity" which had undertaken a course of action to preach awareness among Bengali Muslims of their cultural heritage. Referring to the uneducated mullahs' reservation about learning geography on the baseless ground that the subject was created by the "Kafir English," Islamabadi wrote:

We wouldn’t be able to change our conditions, let alone make progress, until we would take the trouble to review out[sic] history and acquire essential knowledge about geography, science, industry, commerce and agriculture, et cetera.

Islamabadi supported the Indian National Congress and took an active part in the movement for the annulment of the Partition of Bengal. He also participated actively in the Non-cooperation Movement and Khilafat Movement and was the President of the provincial Congress Committee. He, along with Mohammad Akram Khan toured throughout Bengal and organised Khilafat meetings, particularly in Dhaka and Chittagong. In an article titled Asahojogita-o-Amader Kartbya, Islamabadi declared that to protect Khilafat and to acquire Swaraj were the twin aims of the Khilafat movement. He was among the founders of the Jamiat Ulama-e-Hind, and was appointed a member of its first executive council.

He was one of the architects of the Bengal Pact of 1923. He left Congress politics in the 1930s and joined the Krishak Praja Party and was elected to the Bengal Legislative Assembly in 1937 from this party.

=== Anjuman-i-Ulama-i-Bangala ===
In 1913, Moniruzzaman Islamabadi along with Maulana Abul Kalam Azad, Mohammad Akram Khan, Abdullah al-Baqi and Dr Muhammad Shahidullah led the organising of the Anjuman-i-Ulama-i-Bangala with headquarters in Kolkata. One of the objectives of this organisation was popularising Bengali language among the Muslim middle class. When the Anjuman-i-Ulama-i-Bangala merged into Jamiat Ulema-e-Hind, in 1921, he became the founder of its branch in Bengal, the Jamiat-i-Ulama-i-Bangalah. He founded the Chittagong branch of the organisation and himself became its president.

Through the Anjuman, Islamabadi addressed social ills that plagued the Muslim society like dowry, excessive mahr and young child marriage, without registering the age of consent. Islamabadi was disgusted with the Muslim League, which he viewed as elitist, lacking piety, and not "true Muslims". All the same, by the mid-1930s many Anjuman members, including Mohammad Akram Khan, abandoned Anjuman for the Muslim League. Political scientist Ranabir Samaddar described Islamabadi as "a lonely voice marked by loss, disappointment, and despair" thereafter.

== Death and legacy ==
He was a critic of the Pakistan movement and lived his life at Kolkata after the partition of India, where he died.

Islamabadi was a preacher who wanted to give Bengali Muslims a new identity by invoking universal morality to purify the modern. He wanted to establish an Islamic university in Chittagong but the lack of funds and circumstances of the time did not favour his efforts.

== Works ==
Islamabadi's main objective to project the past glory of Islam, its contributions to the progress of human civilisation and thus inspiring the Bengali Muslims to change their conditions manifested in publications such as:

- Bhugol Shastre Musalman (Muslim contributions in geographical science)
- Khagol Shastre Musalman (Muslim contributions in astronomy)
- Korane Swadhinatar Bani (Messages of freedom in the Qur’an)
- Bharate Islam Prachar (Spreading of Islam in India)
- Musalman Amale Hindur Adhikar (Rights of the Hindus in Muslim Rule)
- Muslim Birangana (Heroic Muslim women)
- Turashker Sultan (Sultan of Turkey)
- Aurangzeb
- Nizamuddin Aulia
