= The Azad =

Bengali-language newspaper

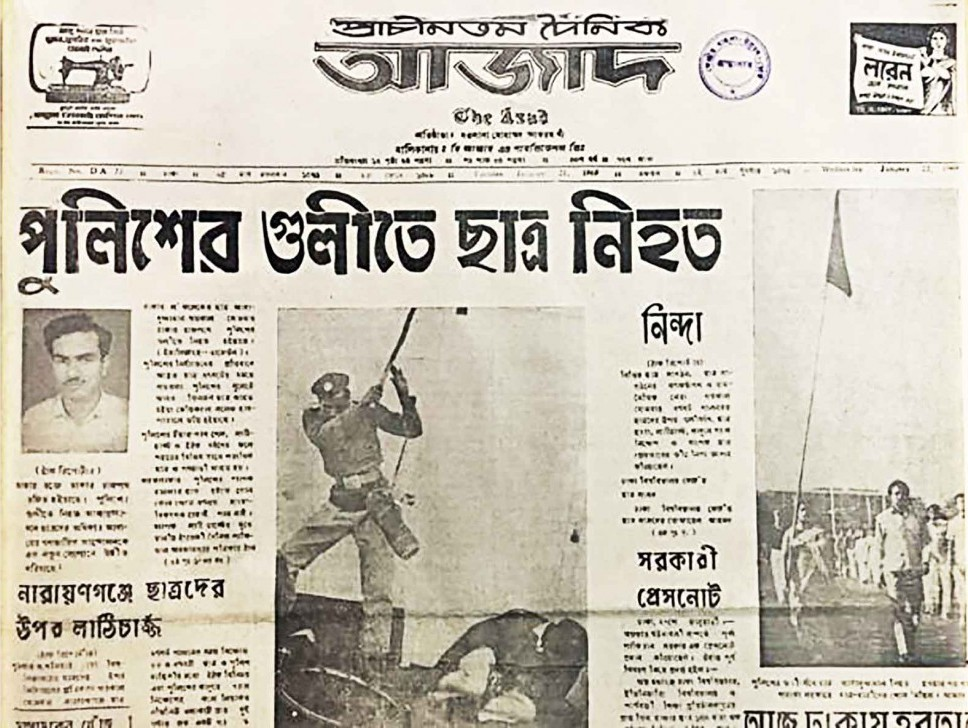
- Front page, 21 January 1969
- Type: Daily newspaper
- Format: Broadsheet
- Founder: Mohammad Akram Khan
- Founded: 1936
- Ceased publication: 1990
- Language: Bengali
- Country: British Raj; India; Pakistan; Bangladesh

The Azad (Bengali: আজাদ) was a Bengali-language daily newspaper published from 1936 to 1990s. The Azad became Dhaka's first daily newspaper. The newspaper while based in Dhaka played an important role during the Bengali language movement for its advocacy of Bengali.

== History ==
The newspaper was founded in Kolkata on 31 October 1936. The first editor of the daily was Maulana Mohammad Akram Khan. In its early days, the daily supported the Muslim League in both Bengal and Assam languages. In the 1940s, the editor was Mohammad Modabber; he published The Azad with his son. Mohammed Sadrul Anam Khan and Nazir Ahmed were also associated during that time. The daily regularly published Dhaka-based and regional news from reporter Khairul Kabir.

After the partition of India, The Azad was transferred to Dhaka on 19 October 1948. It became the first newspaper to move to Dhaka. Abul Kalam Shamsuddin was nominated editor at that time. Khairul Kabir acted as news editor. Mujibur Rahman Khan and Abu Jafar Shamsuddin worked in the editorial section. Soon afterward, the daily became the leading newspaper in East Pakistan.

=== Bengali Language Movement ===
The publication of The Azad was prohibited in 1949 when editorial content turned against the government, which responded by prohibiting advertisements in the paper. The Azad supported the Bengali Language Movement and defied the government's threats. When the killing of February 21 took place, The Azad released a special edition on 22 February. The editor of the newspaper, Abul Kalam Shamsuddin, who was also member of the Legislative Assembly resigned from the assembly in protest.

Despite being a right wing newspaper which previously supported the Muslim League, it published week-long investigative reports on the incidents of February 21. However after 1 March 1952, they succumbed to government pressure and could not remain impartial. During the autocratic regime of General Ayub Khan, the daily again stood up under the leadership of Akram Khan's youngest son, Mohammed Quamrul Anam Khan to protest against corruption and unjust rule. It also played an important role in the toppling of the Ayub Khan government and the Agartala Conspiracy Case.

=== Decline ===
The daily quickly lost its appeal after Maulana Mohammad Akram Khan died and ownership controversies arose. It lost readership from competition with Ittefaq which became increasingly popular. After the independence of Bangladesh, the daily lost government financial aid. Later, the daily was given to its legal owner and managing director, Mohammad Quamrul Anam Khan to be run under private administration. Due to lack of financial support and government policies, The Azad was shut down in 1990.

== See also ==
- List of newspapers in Bangladesh
