= Mohammad Akram Khan =

Bengali journalist, Islamic scholar and politician

Mawlana Mohammad Akram Khan
- মোহাম্মদ আকরম খাঁ
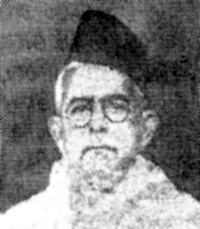
- Khan (before 1947)

President of Bangla Academy
- In office 1961–1961
- Succeeded by: Mohammad Barkatullah

Personal details
- Born: c. 1868 24 Parganas, Bengal, British India
- Died: 18 August 1968 (aged 99–100) Dacca, East Pakistan, Pakistan
- Education: Calcutta Madrasah (now known as Aliah University)

Mohammad Akram Khan (Bengali: মোহাম্মদ আকরম খাঁ; 1868 – 18 August 1968) was a Bengali journalist, politician and Islamic scholar. He was the founder of Dhaka's first Bengali newspaper, The Azad. He was among the founders of Jamiat Ulama-e-Hind.

== Early life and education ==
Khan was born in 1868, to a Bengali Muslim family in Hakimpur, 24 Parganas district of Bengal Presidency, British India (in present-day West Bengal). His father, Alhaj Mawlana Ghazi Abdul Bari Khan, was a disciple of Sayyid Ahmad Shahid and participated in the Battle of Balakot. His mother's name was Rabeya Khatun. He did not have a British education but studied at Calcutta Madrasah (now Aliah University). He entered the journalism profession at a very young age before becoming involved in politics.

== Career ==
=== Journalism ===
Early in his career, he worked at newspapers Ahl-i-Hadith and Mohammadi Akhbar. Between 1908 and 1921, he worked as the editor of the Mohammadi and the Al-Islam. He published the Zamana and the Sebak between 1920 and 1922. Sebak was banned and Akram Khan was arrested on the basis that his anti-government editorials supported the Non-cooperation Movement and the Swadeshi movement.

From October 1936, Akram Khan began publishing the newspaper The Azad, which generated support for the Muslim League in Bengal.

=== Political career ===
Akram Khan's participated during the formation of All India Muslim League in 1906. As a member of the Anjuman-i-Ulama-i-Bangala, he was involved in the Khilafat and Non-cooperation Movement from 1918 to 1924. He was elected secretary of the All India Khilafat Committee at the conference held at Ahsan Manzil in Dhaka in 1920, which was attended by other eminent Khilafat Movement leaders like Abul Kalam Azad, Maniruzzaman Islamabadi and Mujibur Rahman. Akram was responsible for collecting funds for the Ottoman caliphate. During 1920–1923, he organised public meetings in different parts of Bengal to propagate the cause of the Khilafat and the Non-cooperation Movement. As a believer in Hindu-Muslim amity, Akram Khan supported Chitta Ranjan Das's Swaraj Party in Kolkata in 1922, and also the Bengal pact in 1923. But due to the communal riots of 1926–1927 and other contemporary political developments, Akram Khan lost his faith in Indian nationalist politics and left both the Swaraj Party and Congress. He co-founded the Jamiat Ulama-e-Hind, and became a member of its first executive council.

From 1929 to 1935, Khan was deeply involved in the Krishak Praja Party. However, he left peasant politics in 1936 and became an activist for the Muslim League. He was a member of the central working committee of the League until 1947. After the partition of India in 1947, he opted for East Bengal and settled in Dhaka. He was the President of Muslim League (East Pakistan) until he retired from politics in 1960.

Akram Khan was also involved in the Bengali language movement of 1952. He was also a founding member of Pakistan's Council of Islamic Ideology, a constitutional body formed in 1962.

== Death ==
Khan died on 18 August 1968. He was buried at the Ahl-i-Hadith Bangshal mosque at Old Dhaka.

== Literary works ==
- Samasya O Samadhan
- Mostafa Charit
- Amparar Tafseer
- Tafser-a-Quran
- Muslim Banglar Samajik Itihas

== Awards ==
- Independence Day Award (1981)
