= Pangsha =

Pangsha পাংশা
- Town
- Location in Bangladesh
- Coordinates: 23°47.5′N 89°25′E
- Country: Bangladesh
- Division: Dhaka Division
- District: Rajbari District
- Upazila: Pangsha Upazila

Area
  - Total: 414.24 km^{2} (159.94 sq mi)

Population (1991)
  - Total: 316,752
  - Density: 764.66/km^{2} (1,980.5/sq mi)
- Time zone: UTC+6 (BST)
- Postal code: 7720
- Website: Visit

Pangsha Municipality mahallah geocode map

Pangsha (Bengali: পাংশা) is a town in Rajbari District, Bangladesh, part of Pangsha Upazila. It was formed in 1990.
