= Saogat =

Cover of Saugat, a leading Bengali literary journal, first published in Calcutta in 1918

Saogat, also called Saugat (transl. Gift), was a leading Bengali literary journal. First published in Calcutta in 1918, its editor was Mohammad Nasiruddin. Abdul Karim, a scholar, also edited the magazine, which was published on a monthly basis. It mostly covered the work of Bengali Muslim authors and supported for the involvement of Bengali Muslim women in literary activities.

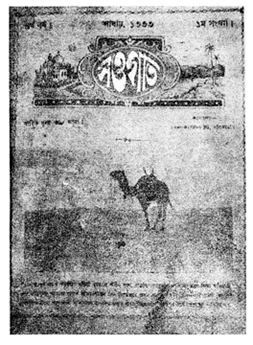
Cover of Saogat

The publication of Saogat was kept suspended in 1922 due to financial constraints. In 1926, its publication was resumed and since then it continued uninterruptedly until 1947.
