= Bangladeshi 5-taka note =

Bangladeshi 5-taka banknote

Five Taka
- Country: Bangladesh
- Value: ৳5
- Width: 118 mm
- Height: 62 mm
- Security features: Watermark, security thread and see-through register
- Years of printing: 1972 (1st version); 2025 (latest version)

Obverse
- Design: Star Mosque and Nymphaea nouchali
- Design date: 2 June 2025; 17 months ago

Reverse
- Design: Graffiti of the July Revolution
- Design date: 2 June 2025; 17 months ago

The Bangladeshi 5-taka note (৳5) is a denomination of the Bangladeshi currency, first introduced on 2 June 1972. It is issued by the Government of Bangladesh and bears the signature of the Finance Secretary instead of the Bangladesh Bank governor.

== History ==
The first 5-taka note, part of the "Map Series," was introduced in 1972 and featured a map of Bangladesh alongside a portrait of Bangabandhu Sheikh Mujibur Rahman on the obverse. The reverse depicted guilloche patterns with the denomination in Bengali ("৫"). This series remained in circulation until it was withdrawn on 1 April 1973.

Subsequent issues included a new design featuring the National Martyrs’ Memorial (Jatiyo Sriti Soudho) on the obverse and the Kusumba Mosque on the reverse. Security features such as a watermark of Bangabandhu Sheikh Mujibur Rahman or a Royal Bengal Tiger and a security thread were added to later versions.

== Design and Security Features ==
Obverse:

- An image of the historic Star Mosque (Tara Masjid) located in Dhaka, a renowned example of Islamic architecture in Bangladesh.
- Lotus flowers in the background as an element of natural beauty and national identity.
- The words "পাঁচ টাকা" (Five Taka) and "ঢাকা, বাংলাদেশ" (Dhaka, Bangladesh) are printed in Bengali.
- The serial number and issue signature from the Secretary of Finance Khairuzzaman Mozumder are also visible.

Reverse:

- A graffiti themed on state oppression, injustice, and the suffering of civilians, particularly students, women, and children. It blends allegorical, religious, and revolutionary imagery to highlight a deep sense of societal pain and the resilience of those resisting tyranny.
- Persons like Abu Syed and Mugdho, along with their final moments, are depicted in the graffiti. Additionally, the artwork also features a girl who was attacked during the unrest, and a man being taken into custody by the police
- Bengali phrases on the graffiti, such as "আমার বাসায় ছোট বোন আছে!!" (transl. There is a little sister in my house!!), "পানি লাগবে পানি?" (transl. Anyone need water?), and "৩৬ জুলাই" (36 July), emphasizing oppression and sacrifice.

Security Features:

- Watermark: When held against a light source, a watermark of the face of a Royal Bengal Tiger can be seen along with the logo of Bangladesh Bank and a "5", both of which appear brighter than the tiger.
- Security Thread: A Security Thread is embedded within the note, which can be seen when held against a light source. The Thread has the text "৳ পাঁচ টাকা" (transl. ৳ Five Taka) repeating.

== Current Status ==
As of 2026, the 5-taka note remains legal tender in Bangladesh, although both 5-taka notes and coins are in circulation. The note continues to be printed by The Security Printing Corporation (Bangladesh) Ltd.

== See also ==
- Bangladeshi 5 Taka Coin
- Bangladeshi taka
- Bangladesh Bank
