= Bangladeshi 10-taka note =

Bangladeshi 10-taka banknote

Ten Taka
- Country: Bangladesh
- Value: ৳10
- Width: 122 mm
- Height: 60 mm
- Security features: Watermark, security thread with microprinting, see-through register and tactile marks for the visually impaired
- Material used: Paper
- Years of printing: 1972–present

Obverse
- Design: Baitul Mukarram National Mosque, Nymphaea nouchali
- Design date: 2 June 2025

Reverse
- Design: Graffiti of the July Revolution
- Design date: 2 June 2025

The Bangladeshi 10-taka note (৳10) is a denomination of the Bangladeshi currency, first introduced in 1972. It is issued by the Bangladesh Bank and has undergone several design and security feature enhancements over the years.

== History ==
The initial 10-taka note was introduced on 2 June 1972, featuring a portrait of Bangabandhu Sheikh Mujibur Rahman on the obverse. Over time, the design has evolved to incorporate various national symbols and advanced security features to prevent counterfeiting. Notably, a polymer version of the 10-taka note was issued in 2000 as an experiment but was later withdrawn due to public preference for paper notes.

== Design and Security Features ==
The current 10-taka note, issued on 7 March 2012, includes the following features:

Obverse:

- Portrait of Bangabandhu Sheikh Mujibur Rahman, the Father of the Nation.
- Image of the National Martyrs' Memorial (Jatiyo Sriti Soudho) in Savar.

Reverse:

- Depiction of Baitul Mukarram, the National Mosque of Bangladesh.

Security Features:

- Watermark: Portrait of Bangabandhu Sheikh Mujibur Rahman.
- Security Thread: Embedded thread with microprinting of the Bangladesh Bank's logo and '10 taka' in Bengali text.
- See-through Register: A design element that forms a complete image when held up to the light.
- Tactile Marks: Raised dots to assist visually impaired individuals in identifying the denomination.

== Dimensions ==
The note measures 123 mm in width and 60 mm in height.

== Current Status ==
As of 2025, the 10-taka note remains in active circulation and is widely used in daily transactions across Bangladesh. The Bangladesh Bank continues to update the design and security features to stay ahead of counterfeiting threats.

== See also ==
- Bangladeshi taka
- Bangladesh Bank
