= Bangladeshi 1-taka note =

First currency note of Bangladesh

One Taka
- Country: Bangladesh
- Value: ৳1
- Width: 100 mm
- Height: 60 mm
- Security features: Water mark of a Royal Bengal Tiger in the left hand side of the note. Security thread on the right hand side of Nartional Emblem. Diamond pattern See-through image just above the water mark area.
- Years of printing: 1972 (1st version)

Obverse
- Design: Deers
- Design date: 03 September 1979; 46 years ago

Reverse
- Design: National emblem of Bangladesh
- Design date: 03 September 1979; 46 years ago

The Bangladeshi 1-taka note (৳1) is the first currency note of Bangladesh. It is the smallest denomination of the Bangladeshi currency. It is a government-issued banknote, distinct from those issued by the Bangladesh Bank, and bears the signature of the Finance Secretary instead of the central bank governor.

== History ==
The government of Bangladesh issued the first 1-taka note on 4 March 1972. This initial series, known as the "Map Series," featured a map of Bangladesh on the obverse and guilloche patterns with the denomination in Bengali ("১") on the reverse. This series remained in circulation until it ceased to be legal tender on 30 March 1974.

Subsequent series introduced new designs. A later version depicted a hand holding paddy rice on the obverse and the National emblem of Bangladesh on the reverse. Security features included a watermark of a Royal Bengal Tiger's head and a security thread.

== Current status ==
The 1-taka note remains legal tender in Bangladesh, but its circulation has declined due to the increased use of 1-taka coins. The Security Printing Corporation (Bangladesh) Ltd. has been responsible for printing this note since 1988.

== See also ==
- Bangladeshi taka
- Bangladesh Bank
