= Bangladeshi One Taka Coin =

Bangladeshi currency

1 Taka
- Bangladesh
- Value: 1 ৳
- Shape: Round
- Composition: Copper-Nickel, Steel

Obverse
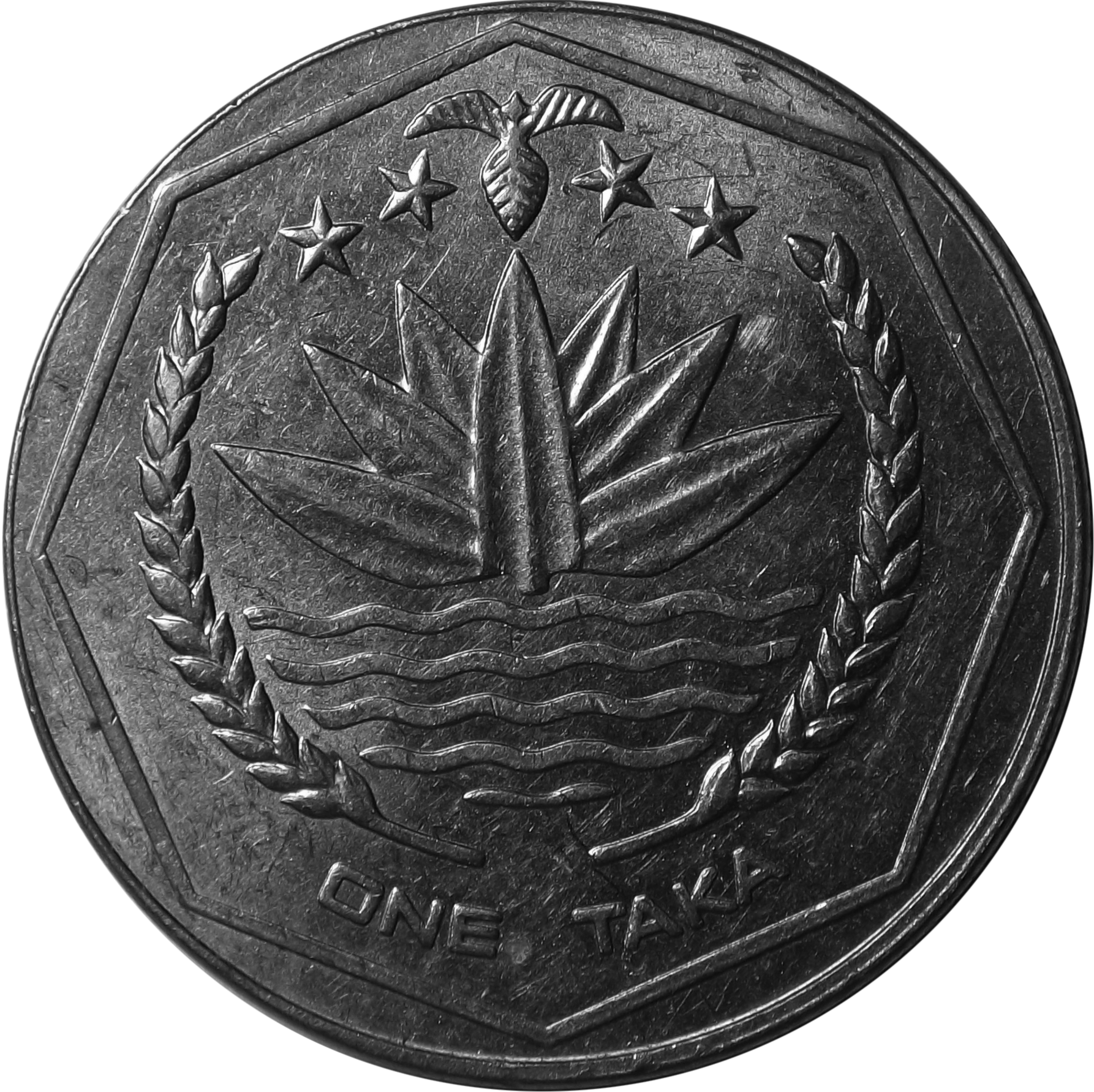
- Design: National emblem of Bangladesh

Reverse
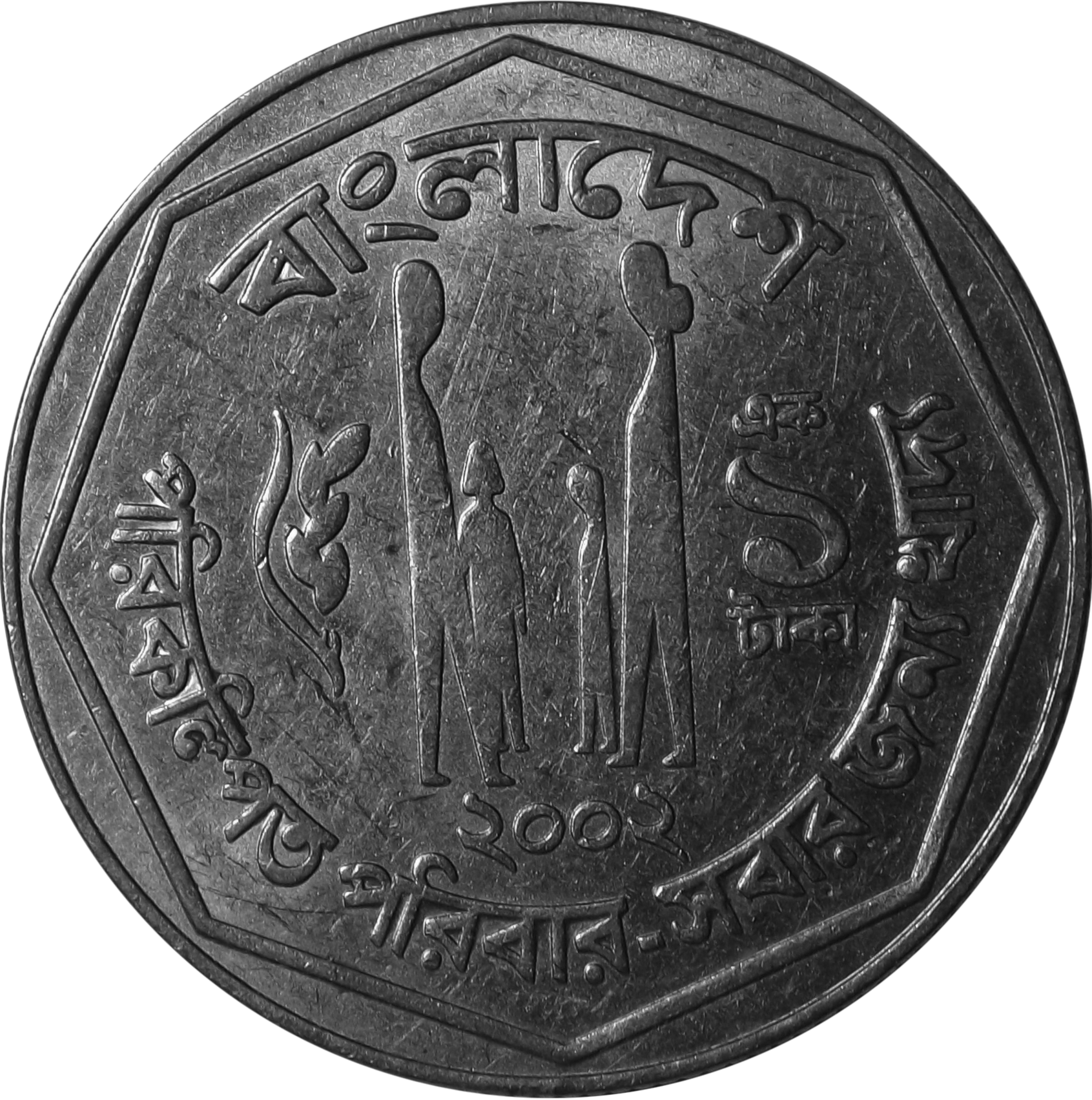
- Design: Family of Four - "Planned Family - Food for All", Rice Grains/ Sheikh Mujibur Rahman

The one taka coin is a circulation issue denomination of Bangladeshi coinage. The one taka coin was first issued in 1974. At present one taka currency is in use in Bangladesh.

== History ==
Until the Bangladesh Liberation War in 1971, the Pakistani Rupee was the currency of the country. Bangladeshi currency was first issued on March 4, 1972, after the independence of Bangladesh. The official currency was named taka. Later "৳" was designated as the symbol of taka. The minimum unit of money fixed is one taka. And a percentage of money is called Paisa. That is, ৳1 is equal to 100 paisa. In 1973, 5 paisa, 10 paisa, 25 paisa and 50 paisa were introduced.

=== Design ===
The obverse of the design of the one-paisa coin featured the national symbols of Bangladesh. At the center of the national emblem is a lotus flower floating in water, surrounded by two grains of rice. Three intertwined jute leaves at top and four stars in total, two each on either side of leaf.

The obverse of this circular coin issued in 1974 had a picture of a family of four with two children representing a happy family. At the top is the word Bangladesh and at the bottom is the year of issue, the value of the coin is written in numerals and languages on the right side and the grain of rice is on the left side. The slogan "Planned Family - Food for All" was also written.

== See also ==
- Economy of Bangladesh
- Bangladeshi 5 Taka Coin
