= Bangladeshi 1-poisha =

1 paisa
- Bangladesh
- Value: 0.01 ৳
- Shape: round
- Composition: Aluminium

Obverse
- Design: Shapla

Reverse
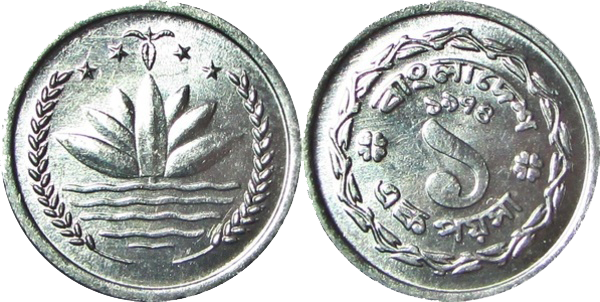
- Design: Floral Ornamental Design

One poisha is the smallest and lowest denomination metal coin of the Bangladeshi taka. The one-paisa aluminium coin was first issued in 1974. Currently, the one-paisa coin is not in use in Bangladesh.

== History ==
Until the Bangladesh Liberation War in 1971, the Pakistani rupee was the currency of the country. The Bangladeshi currency was first issued on March 4, 1972, after Bangladesh gained independence. The official currency was named taka; later "৳" was designated as the symbol of taka. The minimum unit of money fixed is one rupee. And a percentage of money is called paisa. That is, ৳1 is equal to 100 paise. 5 paisa, 10 paisa, 25 paisa, and 50 paisa were introduced in 1973.

=== Design ===
the National Emblem of Bangladesh was on the design of the one paisa coin. At the center of the national emblem is a shapla flower floating in water, surrounded by two paddy heads. Three intertwined leaves of jute tree at the top and four stars in total, two each on either side of the leaf.

The round aluminum coin issued in 1974 had a 'floral ornamental design' on the obverse. At the top of all, the word Bangladesh was written, and at the bottom, the year of issue of the coin was mentioned, at the bottom, the value of the coin was written in numbers and written in words.

== See also ==
- Economy of Bangladesh
- Paisa
- History of the taka
