= Bangladeshi two-taka coin =

Bangladeshi currency

2 taka
- Bangladesh
- Value: 2 ৳
- Mass: 7 g
- Diameter: 26.03 mm
- Shape: Round
- Composition: Steel

Obverse
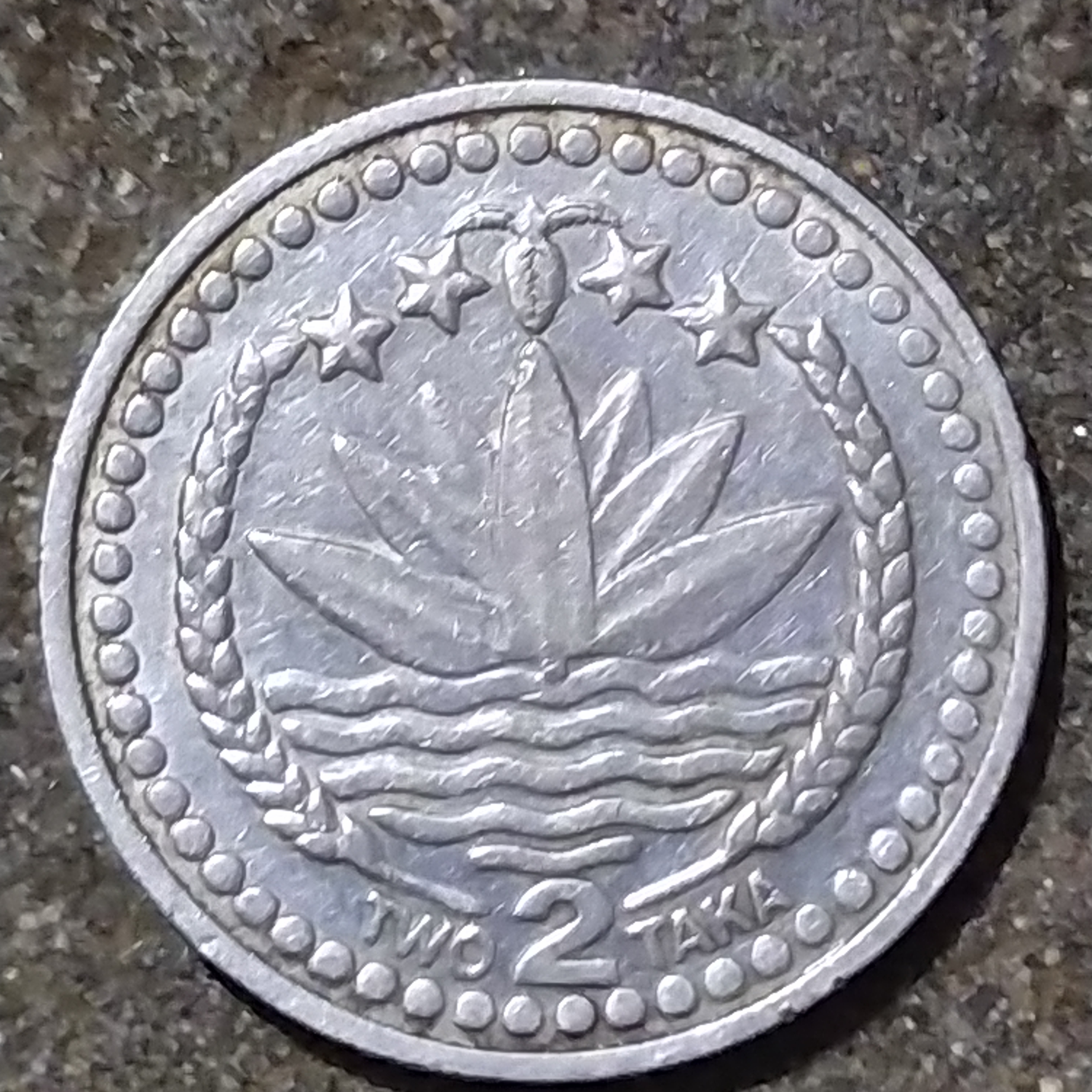
- Design: National emblem of Bangladesh

Reverse
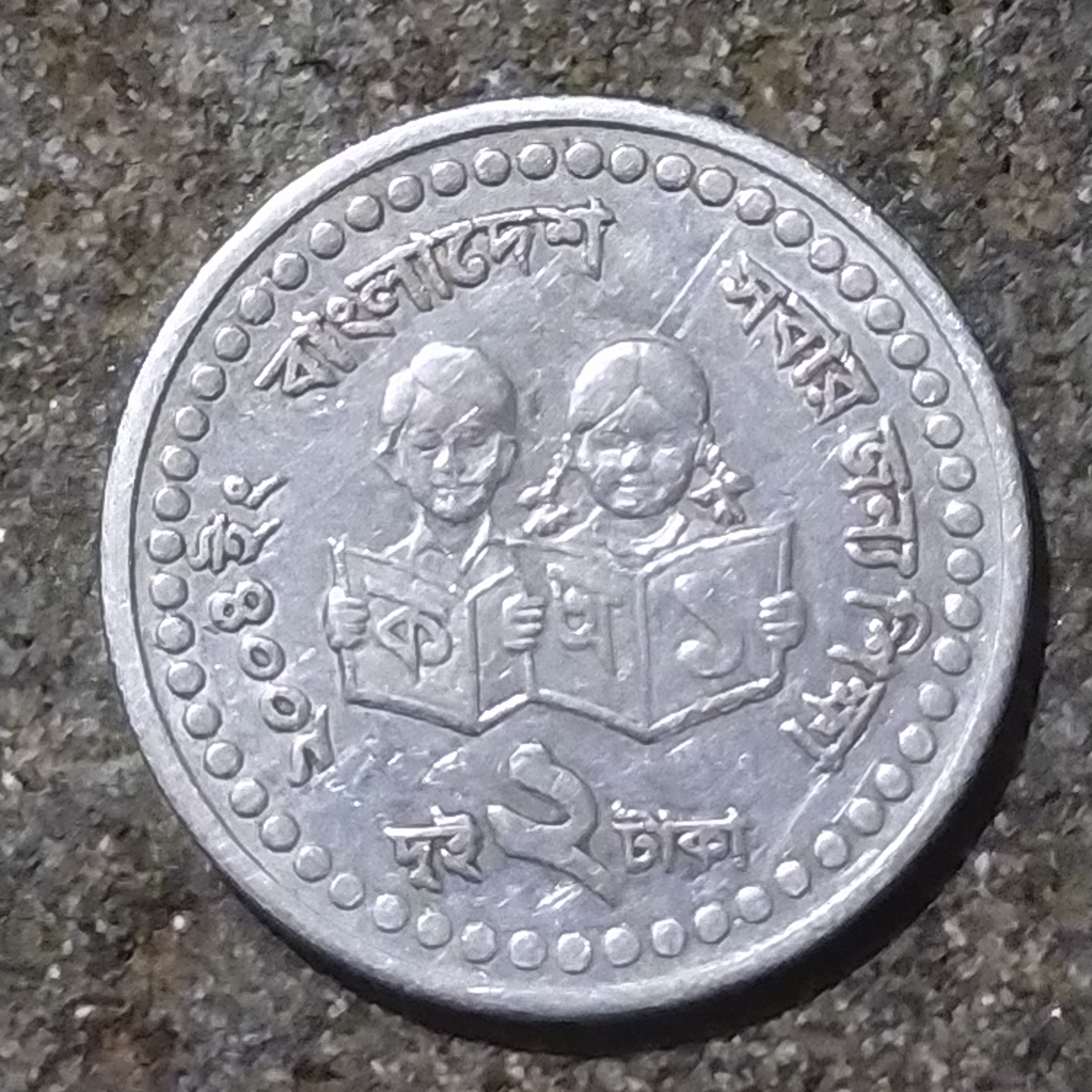
- Design: "Education for All" slogan

Two taka is a metal coin of Bangladeshi taka. The two taka currency was first issued in 2004. Two taka coins are currently in use in Bangladesh.

== History ==
Until the Liberation War in Bangladesh in 1971, the Pakistani rupee was the currency of the country. Bangladeshi currency was first issued on March 4, 1972, after the independence of Bangladesh. The official currency was named taka. Later "৳" was designated as the symbol of taka. The minimum unit of money fixed is one rupee. And a percentage of money is called paisa. That is, ৳1 is equal to 100 paise. In 1973, 5 paisa, 10 paisa, 25 paisa, and 50 paisa were introduced.

=== Design ===
On 29 December 1988, the second government note of Rs 2 was issued.

In 2004, a 2-taka coin made of "steel" was issued. The obverse of the design of this coin had the national symbol of Bangladesh. At the center of the national emblem is a lotus flower floating in water, surrounded by two grains of rice. Three intertwined jute leaves at the top and four stars in total, two each on either side of leaf. The obverse of this coin has two children (boy and girl) reading a book. The coin also had the year of issue, the inscription "Bangladesh", the value of the coin in numerals and languages, and the slogan "Education for All".

In 2013, the government signed an agreement with a Japanese company to produce 500 million metal coins (coins) worth two taka. The obverse of this coin had the national symbol of Bangladesh, and the reverse had the portrait of Bangabandhu Sheikh Mujibur Rahman.

== See also ==
- Economy of Bangladesh
