= Bangladeshi five paise =

Five paisa
- Bangladesh
- Value: 0.05 ৳
- Mass: 1.4 g
- Diameter: 22 mm
- Thickness: 1.93 mm
- Edge: smooth
- Shape: square with rounded corners
- Composition: Aluminium
- Years of minting: 1973

Obverse
- Design: Shapla

Reverse

Five paisa, the Bangladeshi five paisa coin, was first minted in aluminum in 1973. The obverse depicts a plow with the inscriptions "Bangladesh" written above and "Five Paisa" written below. The coin weighs 1.4 grams, has a diameter of 22 millimeters, and a thickness of 1.93 millimeters. The edges of the coin are smooth, and the shape is rounded with no prominent square shape.

== History ==
Until the Bangladesh Liberation War in 1971, the Pakistani rupee was used in Bangladesh. After gaining independence, the first Bangladeshi currency was issued on March 4, 1972. The official currency was named taka, later represented with the symbol "৳". The minimum unit of money fixed at one rupee, while fractional portions of one taka were referred to as paisa.

In 1973, the Bangladeshi government began circulating 5, 10, 25, and 50 paisa coins. After 1973, five paisa coins were re-issued in 1974–1975, 1977–1979, and 1994.

== See also ==
- Bangladeshi taka
- Economy of Bangladesh
- Paisa
- History of the taka
