= Banknotes of the Bangladeshi taka =

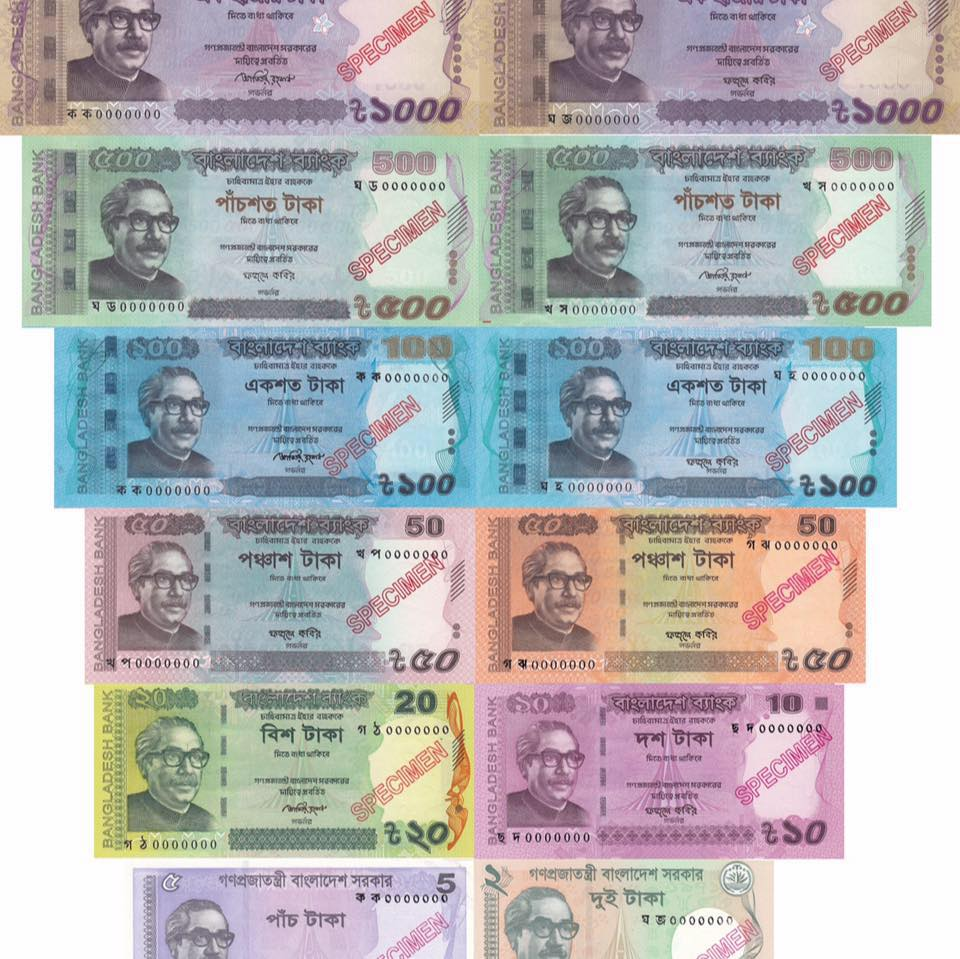
Banknotes from the Bangabandhu series, issued between 2011 and 2025

Taka is the official currency of the People's Republic of Bangladesh. The Bangladesh Bank is responsible for the issuance of most of the taka banknotes. The taka banknotes were first issued in 1972, following the independence of Bangladesh, replacing the Pakistani rupee. The Security Printing Corporation (Bangladesh) Ltd. has the sole legal authority for the printing of the banknotes.

There had been eleven series of taka banknotes since the issuance of the first series in 1972. Banknotes generally feature the heritage sites (mostly mosques), national monuments, and portrayals of the village life, agriculture, industry, and animals of the country. Apart from this, the portrait of Sheikh Mujibur Rahman, the founding president of Bangladesh, used to feature on the obverse of the series issued under the Awami League governments.

== First series ==
Bangladesh introduced its first banknotes on 4 March 1972. At first, 1 taka and 100 taka banknotes were introduced. Later, 10 and 5 taka notes were added. This first issued series is commonly known as the "map series". These banknotes are considered emergency issue banknotes to replace the Pakistan rupee banknotes, both with and without rubber stamp overprints.

Map Series (1972)
Image		Value	Description		Period
Obverse	Reverse	Value	Obverse	Reverse	Period
		৳1	Map of Bangladesh	Guilloche patterns and "1" in Bengali ("১")	4 March 1972 – 30 March 1974
		৳5	Map of Bangladesh and Sheikh Mujibur Rahman	Guilloche patterns and "5" in Bengali and English	2 June 1972 – 1 April 1973
		৳10	Map of Bangladesh and Sheikh Mujibur Rahman	Guilloche patterns and "10" in Bengali and English	2 May 1972 – 1 April 1973
		৳100	Map of Bangladesh and Sheikh Mujibur Rahman	Guilloche patterns and "100" in Bengali and English	4 March 1972 – 1 April 1973

== Second series ==
After issuing the first banknotes, there were many conspiracy theories, counterfeiting problems, and rumours, so the government issued the second series. These second series banknotes were printed by Thomas De La Rue of the United Kingdom. First-issued banknotes were subsequently withdrawn from circulation by 30 April 1974 after having ceased to hold legal tender status from 30 March 1974.

Thomas De La Rue Series (1972)
Image		Value	Main Color	Description		First Issue
Obverse	Reverse	Value	Main Color	Obverse	Reverse	First Issue
		৳1	Dark purple, light purple and khaki	Hand holding paddy rice	National Emblem of Bangladesh	2 March 1973
		৳5	Red	Sheikh Mujibur Rahman	Shapla flowers	1 September 1972
		৳10	Green	Sheikh Mujibur Rahman	Rural landscape of riverine Bangladesh	2 June 1972
		৳100	Gray	Sheikh Mujibur Rahman	Riverscape of rural Bangladesh	1 September 1972

== Third series ==
The Bangladesh government signed agreements with Thomas De La Rue and Bradbury Wilkinson at the same time. Both of them printed same the denominations with different designs almost at the same time. As a result, two different series were circulating at the same time.

Bradbury Wilkinson Series (1972)
Image		Value	Main Color	Description		First Issue
Obverse	Reverse	Value	Main Color	Obverse	Reverse	First Issue
		৳1	Dark purple, light purple and khaki	Woman pounding grain	Hand holding paddy rice, and the National Emblem of Bangladesh	18 December 1973
		৳5	Red	Sheikh Mujibur Rahman	Factories by a river	15 September 1972
		৳10	Green	Sheikh Mujibur Rahman	Rural scene	15 October 1973

== Fourth series ==
In 1976, following the assassination of Sheikh Mujibur Rahman and subsequent regime changes in 1975, a completely new series of notes was introduced, except for the 1-taka note, which was released as the second variety of the third issue during 1976. The notes of this issue are notable for the absence of the portrait of Sheikh Mujib, whose portrait had dominated all issues of the Bangladesh Bank until this issue. Instead of the familiar portrait, each note has an illustration of the Star Mosque on its front. 50 and 500 taka denominations were added in this series. 5, 10, 50, and 100 taka denominations were printed by Thomas De La Rue. 500 taka notes were printed by Giesecke and Devrient of Germany.

Star Mosque Series (1976)
Image		Value	Main Color	Description		First Issue
Obverse	Reverse	Value	Main Color	Obverse	Reverse	First Issue
		৳5	Brown	Star Mosque	Factories by a river	11 October 1976
		৳10	Purple	Star Mosque	Rice harvest	11 October 1976
		৳50	Orange	Star Mosque	Tea garden	1 March 1976
		৳100	Orange and blue	Star Mosque	River scene	1 March 1976
		৳500	Blue, purple and black	Star Mosque	Supreme Court of Bangladesh	15 December 1976

== Fifth series ==
The fifth issue of banknotes was introduced over a two-year period from December 1977 to September 1979. The notes of this issue are very similar to those of the fourth issue, except the Star Mosque was replaced on most notes by a new vignette, and the colours of the notes are a little darker. There was no 500-taka note released in this issue, but a new denomination note of 20 taka was introduced on 20 August 1979, being the last note of this issue prepared by the Bangladesh Bank.

Fifth Series (1977)
Image		Value	Main Color	Description		First Issue
Obverse	Reverse	Value	Main Color	Obverse	Reverse	First Issue
		৳1	Orange and yellow	The National Emblem of Bangladesh	Three spotted deer	3 September 1979
		৳5	Brown	Mihrab of the Kusumba Mosque	Factories by a river	2 May 1978
		৳10	Purple	Atia Mosque	Rice harvest	3 August 1978
		৳20	Green	Choto Sona Mosque	Jute washing	20 August 1979
		৳50	Orange	Sat Gambuj Mosque	Tea garden	4 June 1979
		৳100	Blue and brown	Star Mosque	Southern gate of Lalbagh Fort	15 December 1977

== Sixth series ==
During the 1980s, some designs of taka notes were introduced, but most of the designs were the same. A new denomination of taka 2 note was also introduced. 10 and 50 takas were redesigned. Other denominations were the same as the previous series.

1980s Banknotes
Image		Value	Main Color	Description		First Issue
Obverse	Reverse	Value	Main Color	Obverse	Reverse	First Issue
		৳2	Salmon pink and green	Shaheed Minar	The doyel (the national bird)	29 December 1988
		৳10	Copper	Atia Mosque	Spillway of Kaptai Dam	3 September 1982
		৳50	Red	National Martyrs' Memorial	Jatiya Sangsad Bhaban	24 August 1987

== Seventh series ==
After the Awami League formed a government in 1996, newly designed banknotes of 10, 50, and 500 taka were issued from 1997. The 10 taka note had a portrait of Sheikh Mujibur Rahman for the first time since the third series.

90s Series
Image		Value	Main Color	Description		First Issue
Obverse	Reverse	Value	Main Color	Obverse	Reverse	First Issue
		৳10	Green and brown	Sheikh Mujibur Rahman	Lalbagh Fort Mosque	11 December 1997
		৳50	Orange	Jatiya Sangsad Bhaban	Bagha Mosque	22 August 1999
		৳500	Blue and orange	National Martyrs' Memorial	Supreme Court of Bangladesh	2 July 1998

== Eighth series ==
This series was printed between 2000 and 2001. A polymer banknote of denomination 10 was added, but later withdrawn due to lack of popularity. Paper notes of denomination 100 and 500 were printed with new designs. A portrait of Sheikh Mujibur Rahman was added on each new note replacing the National Martyrs' Memorial.

Bangabandhu Series (2000)
Image		Value	Main Color	Description		First Issue
Obverse	Reverse	Value	Main Color	Obverse	Reverse	First Issue
		৳10	Pink	Sheikh Mujibur Rahman and Baitul Mukarram National Mosque	Jatiya Sangsad Bhaban	14 December 2000
		৳100	Blue	Sheikh Mujibur Rahman and Sixty Dome Mosque	Bangabandhu Bridge	15 March 2001
		৳500	Cream and Pink	Sheikh Mujibur Rahman and Sat Gambuj Mosque	Supreme Court of Bangladesh	10 August 2000

== Ninth series ==
After the Bangladesh Nationalist Party (BNP) came to power in 2001, a new series of banknotes was introduced between 2002 and 2003. The portrait of Sheikh Mujibur Rahman was absent in this series. In 2008, the 1000 taka note was introduced.

Ninth Series
Image		Value	Main Color	Description		First Issue
Obverse	Reverse	Value	Main Color	Obverse	Reverse	First Issue
		৳10	Pink	National Emblem of Bangladesh and Baitul Mukarram National Mosque	Jatiya Sangsad Bhaban	7 January 2002
		৳100	Blue	National Martyrs' Memorial and Sixty Dome Mosque	Jamuna Bridge	5 June 2002
		৳500	Cream and pink	National Martyrs' Memorial and Sat Gambuj Mosque	Supreme Court of Bangladesh	17 July 2002
		৳1000	Pink	Shaheed Minar, Dhaka	Curzon Hall	27 October 2008

== Tenth series ==
After the Awami League restored power in 2009, the Bangladesh Bank issued a new series of banknotes, phasing out the older designs for new, more secure ones. All banknotes other than the 1 taka feature a portrait of Sheikh Mujibur Rahman on the obverse along with the watermark of the National Martyrs' Memorial.

Bangabandhu Series
Image		Value	Dimensions	Main Color	Description			Date of Issue
Obverse	Reverse	Value	Dimensions	Main Color	Obverse	Reverse	Watermark	Date of Issue
		৳2	100 × 60 mm	Tan & Green	Sheikh Mujibur Rahman and National Martyrs' Memorial (Savar)	Shaheed Minar, Dhaka	Sheikh Mujibur Rahman and electrotype denomination	15 July 2021
		৳5	117 × 60 mm	Grey	Sheikh Mujibur Rahman and National Martyrs' Memorial (Savar)	Kusumba Mosque	Sheikh Mujibur Rahman and electrotype denomination	5 January 2017
		৳10	122 × 60 mm	Pink	Sheikh Mujibur Rahman and National Martyrs' Memorial (Savar)	Baitul Mukarram National Mosque	Sheikh Mujibur Rahman and electrotype denomination	7 March 2012
		৳20	127 × 60 mm	Green	Sheikh Mujibur Rahman and National Martyrs' Memorial (Savar)	Sixty Dome Mosque	Sheikh Mujibur Rahman and electrotype denomination	7 March 2012
		৳50	130 × 60 mm	Orange	Sheikh Mujibur Rahman and National Martyrs' Memorial (Savar)	Ploughing (Zainul Abedin's painting)	Sheikh Mujibur Rahman and electrotype denomination	15 December 2019
		৳100	140 × 62 mm	Blue	Sheikh Mujibur Rahman and National Martyrs' Memorial (Savar)	Star Mosque	Sheikh Mujibur Rahman and electrotype denomination	9 August 2011
		৳200	146 × 63 mm	Yellow	Sheikh Mujibur Rahman and National Martyrs' Memorial (Savar)	Sheikh Mujibur Rahman and Agriculture in Bangladesh	Sheikh Mujibur Rahman and electrotype denomination	17 March 2020
		৳500	152 × 65 mm	Cyan	Sheikh Mujibur Rahman and National Martyrs' Memorial (Savar)	Agriculture in Bangladesh	Sheikh Mujibur Rahman and electrotype denomination	9 August 2011
		৳1000	160 × 70 mm	Violet	Sheikh Mujibur Rahman and National Martyrs' Memorial (Savar)	Jatiya Sangsad Bhaban	Sheikh Mujibur Rahman and electrotype denomination	9 August 2011

== Eleventh series ==
Following the fall of the Awami League in the July Uprising in 2024, the Bangladesh Bank announced plans to redesign Taka banknotes by 2025. The central bank's Currency and Design Advisory Committee, made up of nine members, was selected to submit theme proposals to the Ministry of Finance. The portrait of Sheikh Mujibur Rahman was removed, and graffiti of the July Uprising was added in this series.

Historical and Archaeological Architecture of Bangladesh Series
Image		Value	Main Color	Description		First Issue
Obverse	Reverse	Value	Main Color	Obverse	Reverse	First Issue
		৳2	Light Green	Martyred Intellectuals Memorial, Mirpur	Martyred Intellectuals Memorial, Rayer Bazar	5 June 2025
		৳5	Pink	Star Mosque	Graffiti of the July Uprising	19 May 2026
		৳10	Pink	Baitul Mukarram National Mosque	Graffiti of the July Uprising	3 February 2026
		৳20	Cyan	Kantajew Temple	Somapura Mahavihara	1 June 2025
		৳50	Deep Brown	Ahsan Manzil	The Struggle by Zainul Abedin	1 June 2025
		৳100	Sky Blue	Sixty Dome Mosque	The Sundarbans	12 August 2025
		৳200	Golden Yellow	Aparajeyo Bangla	Graffiti of the July Uprising	5 June 2025
		৳500	Olive Green	Central Shaheed Minar	Supreme Court of Bangladesh	4 December 2025
		৳1000	Violet	National Martyrs' Memorial	Jatiya Sangsad Bhaban	1 June 2025

== Commemorative banknotes ==
The folder of the banknote for the 40th anniversary of the independence of Bangladesh had a spelling error of the name of the country. It was inserted as Bangldesh instead of Bangladesh.

Commemorative banknotes of the Bangladeshi taka
Occasion	Image		Value	Dimensions	Main Colors	Description		Year of Issue	Date of First Issue	Print Volume	Watermark
Occasion	Obverse	Reverse	Value	Dimensions	Main Colors	Obverse	Reverse	Year of Issue	Date of First Issue	Print Volume	Watermark
Victory Day Silver Jubilee (1971–1996)			৳10		Violet on multicolor underprint	Atiya Jam-e Mosque in Tangali	Spillway of Kaptai Dam	1996			Modified tiger head; overprint on obverse watermark area: "VICTORY DAY SILVER JUBILEE '96"
40th Anniversary of Independence (1971–2011)			৳40	122 x 60 mm	Dark red, orange, and green	Sheikh Mujibur Rahman; National monument (Savar)	Soldiers	2011	21 December 2011		Sheikh Mujibur Rahman, electrotype 10 denomination and bank logo
60 Years of Language Movement (1952–2012)			৳60	130 x 60 mm	Yellow, brown, violet, orange, and blue	Shaheed Minar, Dhaka	Veterans of the Bengali language movement; first Shaheed Minar monument (1952)	2012	15 February 2012	20,000 (5000 in folders)	Sheikh Mujibur Rahman on pixelated background, electrotype bank logo and 50
Silver Jubilee of "The Security Printing Corporation (Bangladesh) Ltd." (1988–2013)			৳25	123 x 60 mm	Blue, purple and red	National Martyr's Monument in Savar; Bangladeshi taka banknotes and postage stamps; three spotted deer; magpie-robin (doyel)	Headquarters of the Security Printing Corporation	2013	26 January 2013		Sheikh Mujibur Rahman, electrotype 10 denomination and bank logo
100 Years Bangladesh National Museum (1913–2013)			৳100	140 x 62 mm	Blue and red	18th-century terra-cotta plaque of a horseman	Bangladesh National Museum	2013	9 July 2013	100,000 (11,000 in folders)	Sheikh Mujibur Rahman on a pixelated background, electrotype 100 denomination and bank logo
Developing Bangladesh - March 2018			৳70	140 x 62 mm	Purple, orange and green	Sheikh Mujibur Rahman; map of Bangladesh; National Martyrs' Memorial in Savar; Betbunia Satellite Center	Bangladesh Satellite-1 in orbit above earth; Padma Bridge; Prime Minister Sheikh Hasina	2018	22 March 2018		Sheikh Mujibur Rahman on a pixelated background, electrotype 100 denomination and bank logo
Bangabandhu Centenary (1920–2020)			৳100	140 x 62 mm	Red, orange and yellow	Sheikh Mujibur Rahman; Signature of Bangabandhu.	Picture of the Sundarbans mangrove forest with The Royal Bengal Tiger and the riverbank view	2020	18 March 2020		Sheikh Mujibur Rahman on a pixelated background, electrotype 100 denomination and bank logo
Golden Jubilee of Independence (1971–2021) Circulating commemorative banknote			৳50		Dark Orenge and light yellow	Sheikh Mujibur Rahman; National Martyrs' Monument in Savar; logo for the golden jubilee of independence	"Plough the field" by Shilpacharza Zainul Abedin	2021			Sheikh Mujibur Rahman on a pixelated background, electrotype 50 and bank logo
Golden Jubilee of Independence (1971–2021)			৳50		Purple, light yellow and green	Sheikh Mujibur Rahman; National Martyrs' Monument in Savar; logo for the golden jubilee of independence	Freedom Fighters of the Mukti Bahini	2021			Sheikh Mujibur Rahman on a pixelated background, electrotype 50 and bank logo
Opening of the Padma Multipurpose Bridge, 2022			৳100	146 × 63 mm	Light yellow	Sheikh Mujibur Rahman; Sheikh Hasina; Bangabandhu / Jamuna bridge	Padma bridge	2022	26 June 2022		Sheikh Mujibur Rahman on a pixelated background, electrotype 200 and bank logo
Golden Jubilee of the Constitution and the Supreme Court of Bangladesh (1972–2022)			৳50	130 × 60 mm	Brown	Sheikh Mujibur Rahman; Jatiya Sangsad Bhaban, Dhaka.	Supreme Court of Bangladesh	2022	18 December 2022		Sheikh Mujibur Rahman on a pixelated background, electrotype 50 and bank logo
Opening of the Dhaka Metro Rail, 2022			৳50	130 × 60 mm	Green	Sheikh Hasina; Dhaka Metro Rail	Dhaka Metro Rail	2022	28 December 2022		Sheikh Mujibur Rahman on a pixelated background, electrotype 50 and bank logo
Opening of the Karnaphuli Tunnel, 2023			৳50	130 × 60 mm	Green	Sheikh Mujibur Rahman; Sheikh Hasina; Karnaphuli Tunnel, Chittagong	Karnaphuli Tunnel	2023	29 October 2023		Sheikh Mujibur Rahman on a pixelated background, electrotype 50 and bank logo
