= Bangladeshi fifty-poysha coin =

Bangladeshi currency

50 Poysha
- Bangladesh
- Value: 0.50 Bangladeshi taka
- Years of minting: 1973–2001

Obverse
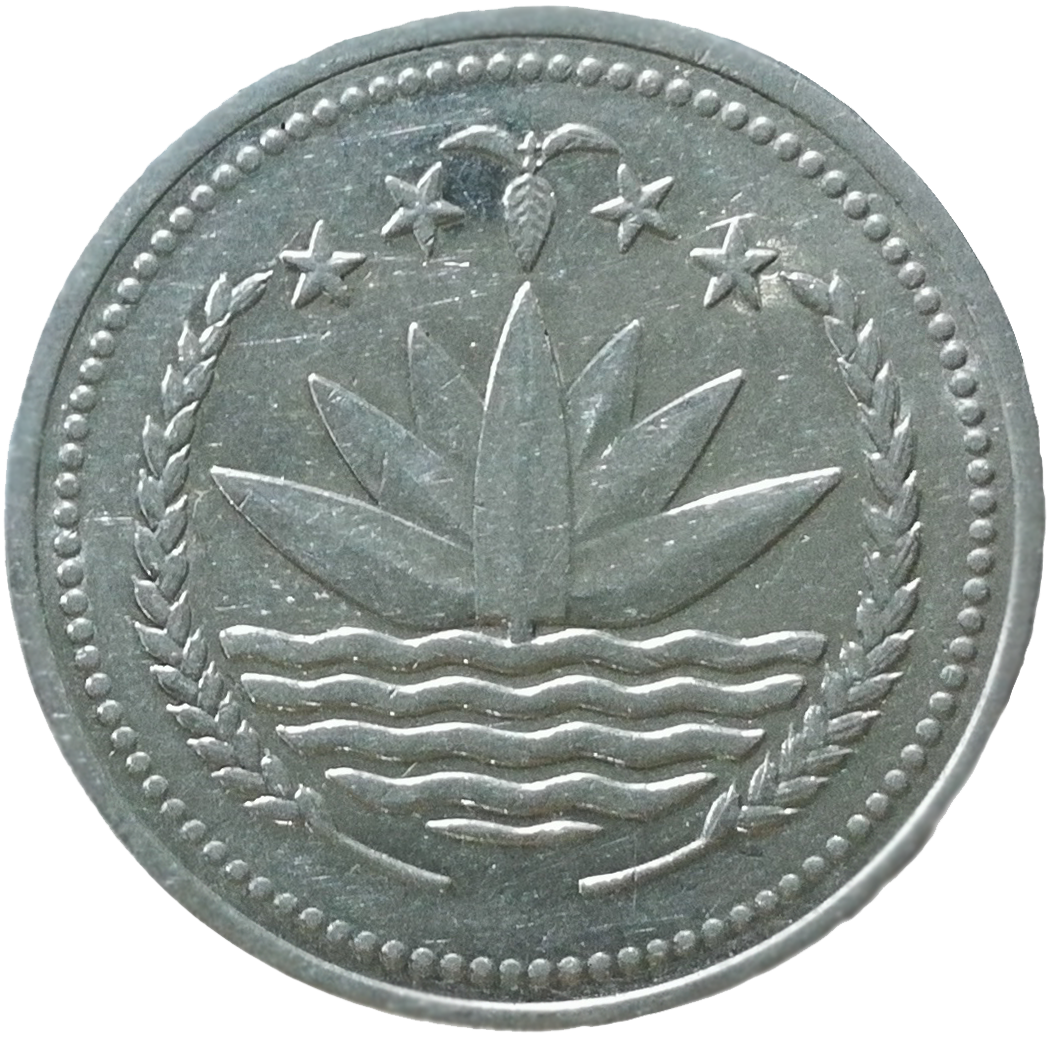
- Design: Shapla

Reverse
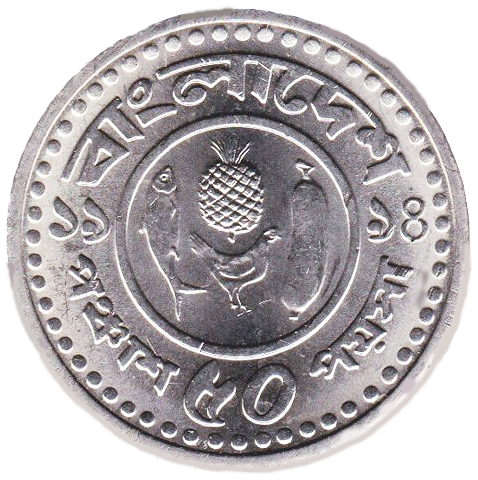
- Design: Ilish, Pineapple, Banana and Chicken

The Bangladeshi decimal fifty-poysha coin (Bengali: পঞ্চাশ পয়সা) was first minted in 1973. It is a small denomination of Bangladeshi monetary unit which is the taka. It equals one half of a taka.

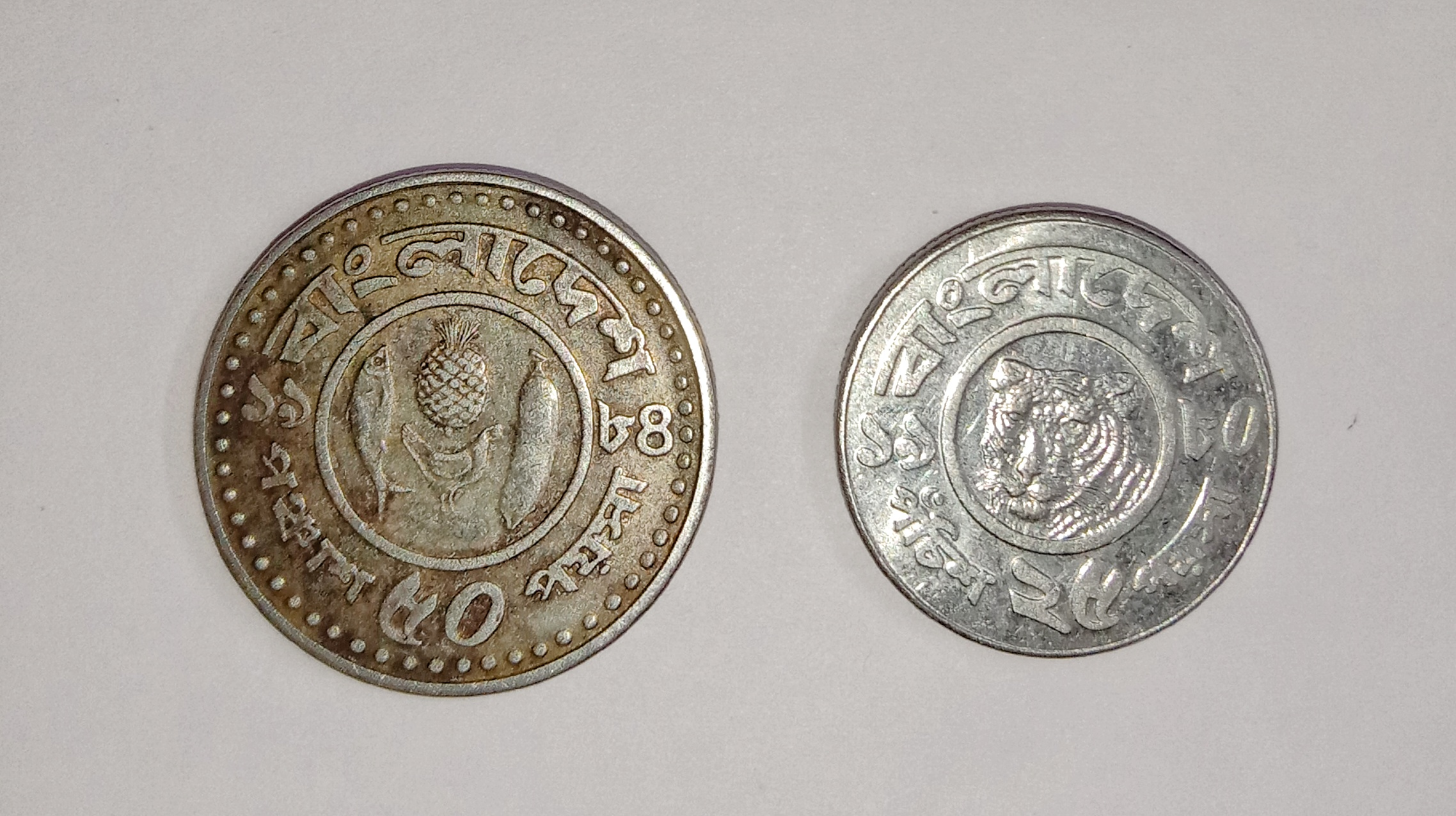
50 poysha coin reverse, 1984 (in left).

== History ==
Until the Great Bangladesh Liberation War in 1971, the Pakistani Rupee was the currency of the country. Bangladeshi currency was first issued on March 4, 1972, after the independence of Bangladesh. The official currency was named Taka, later "৳" was designated as the symbol of Taka. The minimum unit of money fixed is one rupee. And a percentage of money is called Paisa. That is, ৳1 is equal to 100 paise. In 1973, 5 paisa, 10 paisa, 25 paisa and 50 paisa were introduced.

=== Design ===
In the case of the fifty paise coin, three types of designs can be seen from the first circulation of this coin in 1973 until 2001. Each of the three types of designs had the national symbol of Bangladesh on the obverse. At the center of the National Emblem is a lotus flower floating in water, surrounded by two grains of rice. Three intertwined jute leaves at top and four stars in total, two each on either side of leaf. The four asterisks represent the four principles of the Bangladesh constitution (nationalism, secularism, socialism and democracy).

The obverse of the coin issued in 1973 had the inscription Bangladesh at the top with the year of issue below, the dove symbol of peace in the middle, and the value of the coin in numerals and languages at the bottom.

In 1977, the reverse design of the coin was changed. At this time, the dove is removed from it and only the text of Bangladesh is on the upper part, there is a hilsa fish, a pineapple, a banana and a chicken in the middle part, the year of the coin is printed on both sides of the middle part, and the value of the coin is on the bottom of the coin like the previous design. There are writings and writings in languages.

This design was partially modified in 2001. An octagonal shape was introduced on the outside of its rounded circle, leaving the original design unchanged.

serial no	Year of coin issue	Image of the obverse of the coin	Image of the other side of the coin
1	1973		
2	1977		
3	2001		

== characteristics ==
Along with the change in design, some of the features of the fifty paisa coins were also changed. These are:

ক্রমিক নং	মুদ্রা প্রকাশের সাল	ধাতব উপাদান	মুদ্রার আকৃতি	ব্যসার্ধ (মিলিমিটার)	পুরুত্ব (মিলিমিটার)	ওজন (গ্রাম)
1	1973	Steel	গোলাকার	২১.৯	-	৪.০
2	1977	Steel	গোলাকার	২২	১.৫৫	৪.০৫
3	2001	Steel	অষ্টাভুজাকৃতি	১৯.৬		২.৬

== See also ==
- Bangladeshi five Paisa
- Bangladeshi taka
- Economy of Bangladesh
- Paisa
