= Bangladeshi 10-poisha coin =

10 Paisa
- Bangladesh
- Value: 0.10 ৳
- Mass: 23 millimeters g
- Shape: Octagonal
- Composition: Aluminum

Obverse
- Design: Nymphaeaceae

Reverse
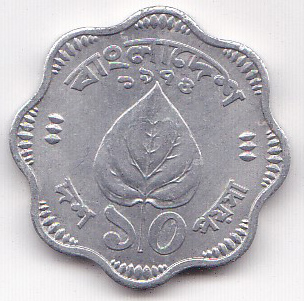
- Design: Betel leaves/ Green revolution slogan/ A family with two children

Ten paisa is a small denomination of Bangladeshi taka currency. The ten paise metal coin was first issued in 1973. Ten paise is not currently in use in Bangladesh.

== History ==
Until the Great Liberation War in Bangladesh in 1971, the Pakistani rupee was the currency of the country. After the independence of Bangladesh, the first Bangladeshi currency was issued on March 4, 1972. The official currency was named Taka, later "৳" was designated as the sign or symbol for Taka. The minimum unit of money fixed is one rupee. And a percentage of money is called Paisa. That is, ৳1 is equal to 100 paise. In 1973, 5 paisa, 10 paisa, 25 paisa and 50 paisa started circulation.

=== Design ===
In the case of the ten paise coin, since its first circulation in 1973, three designs have been seen in this coin. Each of the three types of design had the national emblem of Bangladesh on the front. At the center of the national emblem is a lotus flower floating in water, surrounded by two grains of rice. Three intertwined jute leaves at top and four stars in total, two each on either side of leaf.

In 1973, this 23 mm diameter coin weighed 1.98 grams. On one side of it were palm leaves and on the other side were lotus flowers. In 1974, the design was changed to use the Green Revolution slogan and associated logo on one side. In 1977, the design was changed again to include a picture of a family with two children on one side. In 1981, the diameter of the coin was reduced to 22 millimeters and the weight reduced to 1.39 grams.

== See also ==
- Bangladeshi Taka
- Economy of Bangladesh
- Paisa
