= Bangladeshi 5 Taka Coin =

Bangladeshi currency

Five Taka
- Bangladesh
- Value: 5 ৳
- Mass: 8.17 g
- Diameter: 26.88 mm
- Thickness: 2 mm
- Edge: Plain
- Shape: Dodecagonal (12-sided)
- Composition: Stainless Steel
- Circulation: Standard circulation coins

Obverse
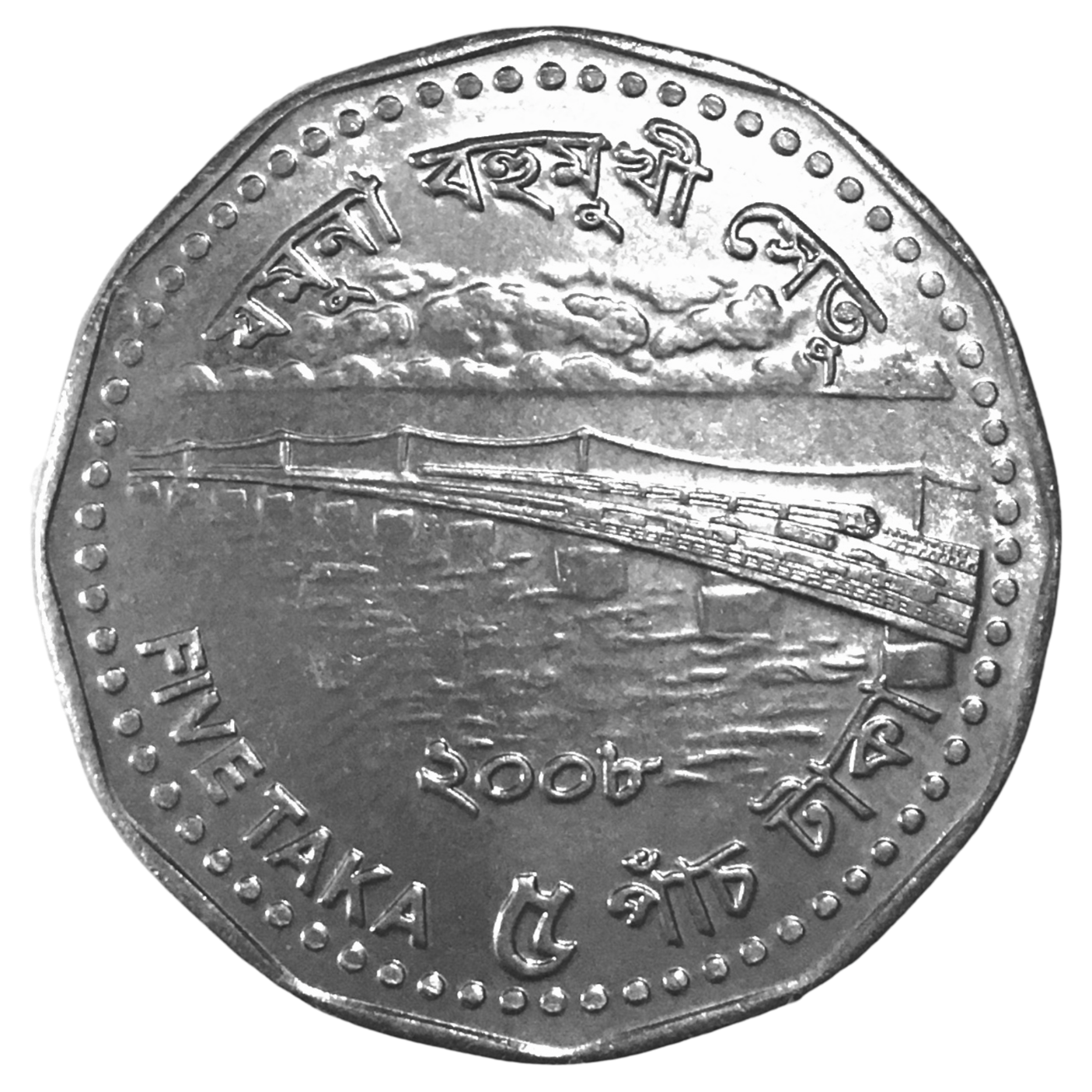
- Design: Jamuna Bridge

Reverse
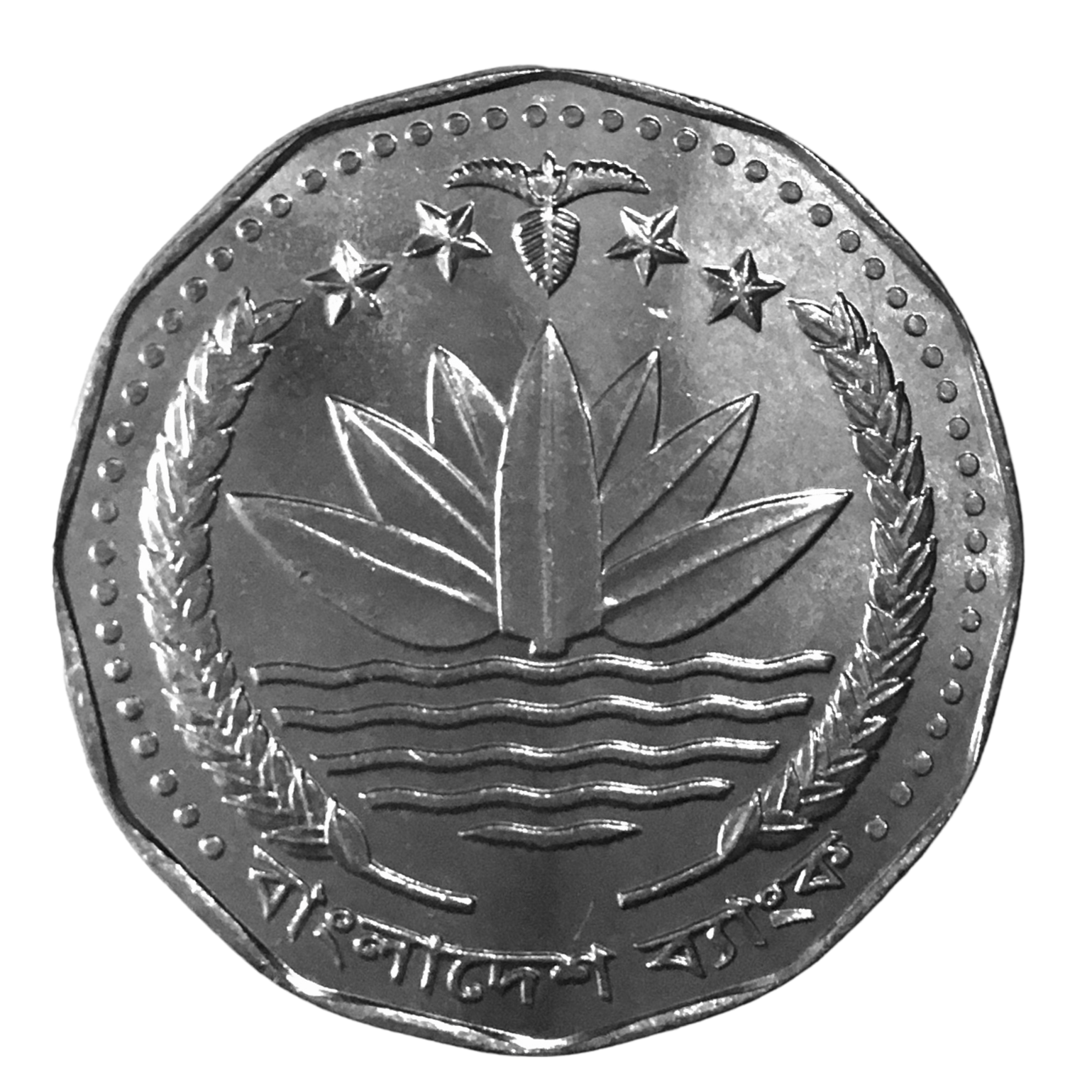
- Design: National Emblem of Bangladesh

Five taka (Bengali: পাঁচ টাকা) is a metal coin of Bangladeshi taka. The five taka coin was first issued in 1993. At present five taka currency is in use in Bangladesh.

== History ==
Until Bangladesh Liberation War in 1971, the Pakistani rupee was the currency of the country. After the independence of Bangladesh, the first Bangladeshi currency was issued on March 4, 1972. The government currency was named taka, later "৳" was designated as the sign or symbol of Taka. The minimum unit of money fixed is one rupee. And a percentage of money is called Paisa. That is, ৳1 is equal to 100 paise. In 1973, 5 paisa, 10 paisa, 25 paisa and 50 paisa started circulation.

=== design ===
The first Tk 5 note was issued on 4 March 1972.

On October 1, 1993, 5 Taka coins were issued. The obverse of the design of this coin had the national symbol of Bangladesh. At the center of the National Emblem of Bangladesh is a lotus flower floating in water, surrounded by two grains of rice. At the top were three intertwined jute leaves and four stars, two each on either side of the leaf, and "Bangladesh Bank". The obverse of this coin had the Jamuna Bridge. Also on the reverse side the coin's year of issue, value of the coin in numerals and language are written.

In 2016, Government of Bangladesh declared 5 taka as official currency.

== See also ==
- Bangladeshi taka
- Economy of Bangladesh
- Paisa
- History of the taka
