= Bangladeshi taka =

Currency of Bangladesh

বাংলাদেশি টাকা (Bengali)

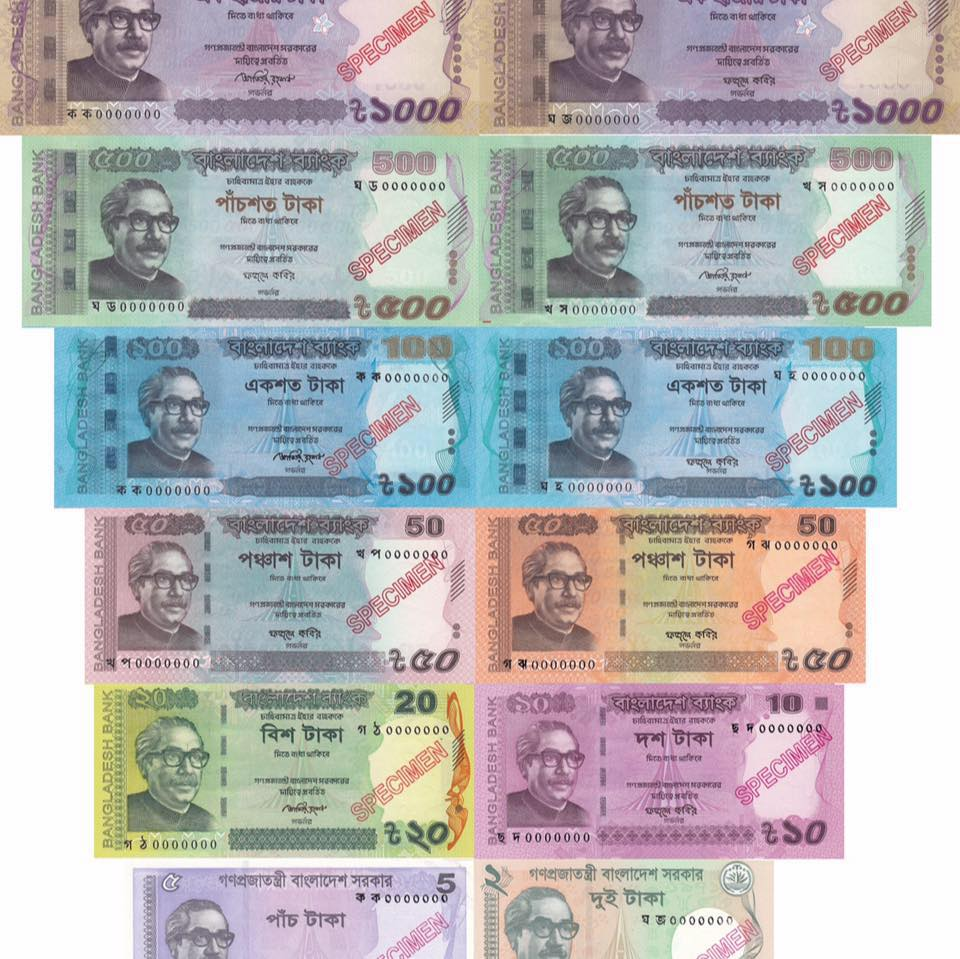
Bangladeshi Taka sign	10th Series Taka banknotes

ISO 4217
- Code: BDT (numeric: 050)
- Subunit: 0.01

Units of account
- Symbol: ৳
- Subunit
- 1/100: Poisha (defunct)
- Symbol
- Poisha: p

Denominations
- Banknotes
- Freq. used: ৳2, ৳5, ৳10, ৳20, ৳50, ৳100, ৳200, ৳500 and ৳1000
- Rarely used: ৳1
- Coins: ৳1, ৳2, ৳5

Demographics
- Date of introduction: 4 March 1972; 54 years ago
- Replaced: Pakistani rupee
- User(s): Bangladesh

Issuance
- Central bank: Bangladesh Bank
- Printer: The Security Printing Corporation Bangladesh Ltd.
- Website: www.spcbl.org.bd
- Mint: The Security Printing Corporation Bangladesh Ltd.

Valuation
- Inflation: ▲8.49%
- Source: BBS, August 2021

The taka (Bengali: টাকা, IPA: [ˈʈa.kaˑ], sign: ৳, code: BDT, short form: Tk) is the currency of Bangladesh.

Issuance of banknotes of ৳10 and larger is controlled by Bangladesh Bank, while the ৳2 and ৳5 government notes are the responsibility of the Ministry of Finance. The government notes of Tk. 2 and Tk. 5 have mostly been replaced by coins, while lower denomination coins (including all poysha coins) up to Tk. 1 have almost gone out of circulation due to inflation. The most commonly used symbol for the taka is "৳" and "Tk", used on receipts while purchasing goods and services. It is divided into 100 poysha, but poysha coins are no longer in circulation. The poysha is still used for accounting purposes (e.g., Tk 123,456.78 for 123,456 taka and 78 poysha).

On 8 May 2024, the central bank placed the taka in a crawling peg to the US dollar, with a rate of 117 takas per US dollar.

== Etymology ==
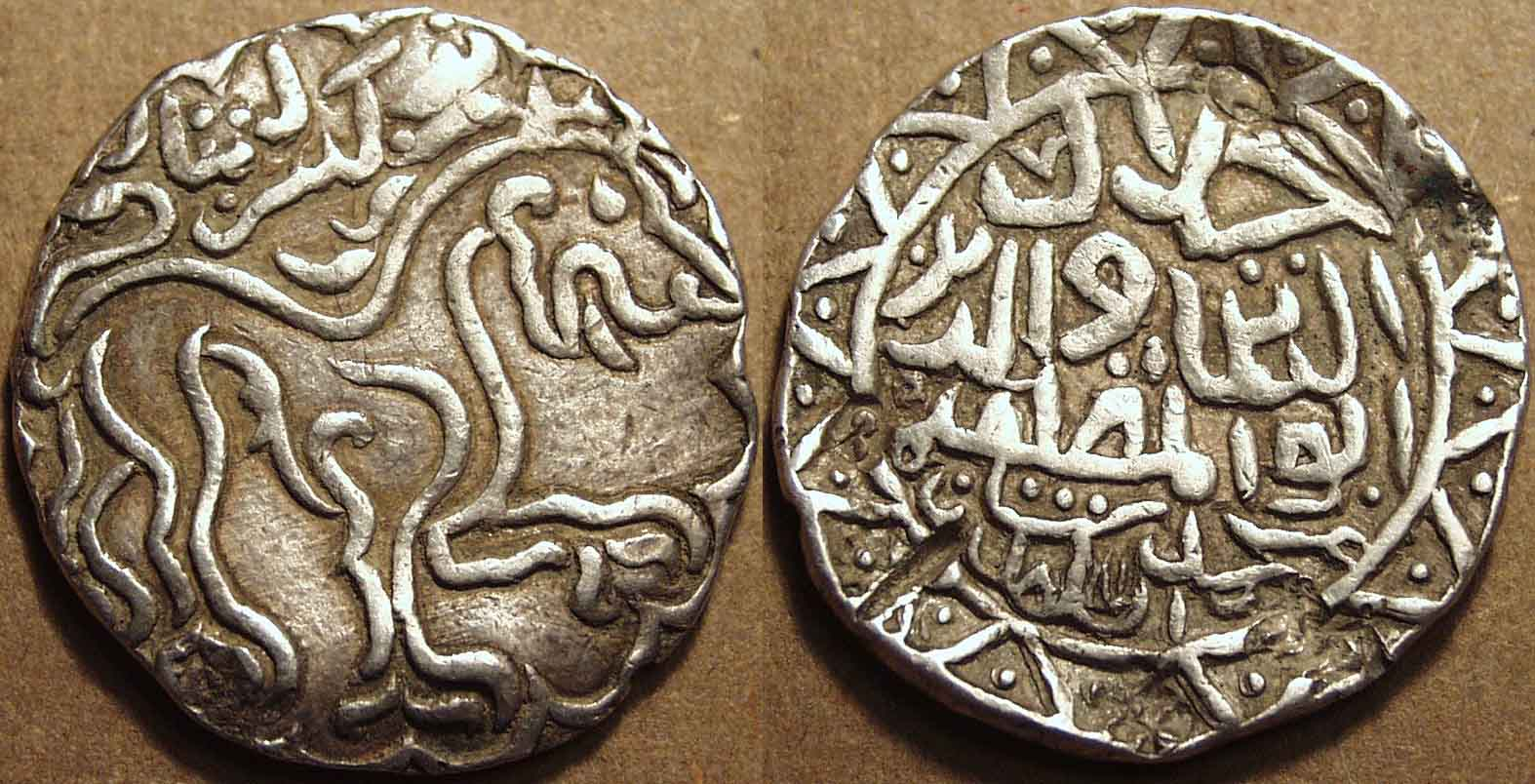
Jalaluddin's tanka (taka), Bengal Sultanate, 15th century

According to The American Heritage Dictionary of the English Language and Banglapedia, the word ṭaka came from the Sanskrit word ṭaṅka, meaning silver coin, a Kulturwort of unclear origin, related to Turkic təñkə "coin, money", compare Tatar tanka, Uzbek tanga, Kazakh tenge, Russian denʹga. In Bangla, the word taka is also used generically to refer to any form of money, currency, or banknotes. Thus, colloquially, a person speaking in Bangla may use "taka" to refer to money regardless of what currency it is denominated in. This is also common in the Indian states of West Bengal and Tripura, where the official name of the Indian rupee is "taka" as well. In other eastern Indian languages with the influence of Prakrit in Bihar it is "taka" in Maithili and Magadhi languages, in Assam it is টকা tôka and it is ଟଙ୍କା taṅkā in Odisha.

== History ==
=== 1947–1971 ===
After the Partition of Bengal in 1947, East Bengal became the eastern wing of Pakistan and was renamed to East Pakistan under the One Unit Scheme in 1956. The Pakistani rupee also bore the word taka on official notes and coins. Bangla was one of the two national languages of the Pakistan union between 1956 and 1971 (the other being Urdu). The Bangladeshi taka came into existence in 1972, a year after the independence of the eastern wing of the union, as the independent nation of Bangladesh.

Prior to the Liberation war in 1971, banknotes of the State Bank of Pakistan circulated throughout Bangladesh, and continued to be used in Bangladesh even after independence for about three months until the official introduction of the taka on 4 March 1972. During the war, it was an unofficial practice of some Bengali nationalists to protest Pakistani rule by stamping banknotes with "বাংলা দেশ" and "BANGLA DESH" as two words in either Bangla or English. These locally produced stamps are known to exist in several varieties, as are forgeries. On 8 June 1971, the Pakistani government declared that all banknotes bearing such stamps ceased to be legal tender. Furthermore, to prevent looted high-denomination notes from disrupting the Pakistani economy, the government also withdrew the legal tender status of all 100- and 500-rupee notes.

=== Since 1972 ===
On 4 March 1972, the taka replaced the Pakistani rupee at par.

==== Treasury banknotes ====
- The first treasury notes in 1972 for ৳1 and notes of the Bangladesh Bank for ৳5, ৳10, and ৳100.
- In 1977, banknotes for ৳50 were introduced, followed by ৳500 in 1979 and ৳20 in 1982.
- ৳1 treasury notes were issued until 1992, with ৳2 treasury notes introduced in 1989.
- ৳1000 banknotes were introduced in 2008.
- ৳5 banknotes, previously issued by Bangladesh Bank, are instead issued by the Government of Bangladesh. These have mostly been replaced by coins since the early 2000s.

==== Banknotes and issues ====
In 2000, the government issued polymer ৳10 notes as an experiment (similar to the Australian dollar). They proved unpopular, however, and were withdrawn later. The ৳1 and ৳5 notes have mostly been replaced with coins, and in 2008, the government issued ৳1,000 notes.

In 2011, Bangladesh Bank began issuing a new series of banknotes denominated in ৳2, ৳5, ৳100, ৳500, and ৳1000. All are dated 2011 and feature a portrait and watermark of the Father of the Nation, Bangabandhu Sheikh Mujibur Rahman, along the National Martyr's Monument in Savar at center front.

From 2011, the Bangladesh Bank introduced new notes denominated in ৳10, ৳20, and ৳50 on 7 March 2012. The notes bear the portrait of Bangabandhu Sheikh Mujibur Rahman and the National Martyr's Monument in Savar on the front. On the back of the notes, the ৳10 will picture the Baitul Mukarram mosque, the ৳20 pictures the Shat Gombuj mosque in Bagherat, and the ৳50 notes feature Shilpacharjo Zainul Abedin's famous painting Ploughing.

On 7 March 2019, Bangladesh Bank released new ৳100 notes, which had the same design as the 2011 version, but had better security, a stronger blue, and were made of a different material.

On 15 December 2019, Bangladesh Bank issued new ৳50 banknotes, with the same design as the 2011 version, but with a different colour (orange, brown, and fluorescent yellow-green) and a slightly different design in some parts.

On 17 March 2020, Bangladesh Bank introduced new ৳200 notes. They bear a portrait of Bangabandhu Sheikh Mujibur Rahman on both sides and a landscape picture of a village, river, and boats.

==== Commemorative banknotes ====
In 2011, Bangladesh Bank also introduced a ৳40 note to commemorate the "40th Victory Anniversary of Bangladesh". The commemorative note features a portrait of the Father of the Nation, Bangabandhu Sheikh Mujibur Rahman, and the National Martyr's Monument in Savar on the front, and six armed men on the back. This note has an electrotype 10 in the watermark, indicating it was likely printed on extra ৳10 banknote paper.

On 15 February 2012, Bangladesh Bank introduced a ৳60 note to commemorate "60 years of National Movement". The commemorative note measures 130 by 60 millimetres (5.1 in × 2.4 in) and features the Shaheed Minar (Martyrs' monument) in Dhaka and five men on the back. Like the ৳40 commemorative note, this note has an electrotype 50 in the watermark. It was likely printed on extra ৳50 banknote paper.

On 26 January 2013, Bangladesh Bank issued a ৳25 note to commemorate the 25th anniversary (silver jubilee) of the Security Printing Corporation (Bangladesh) Ltd. On the front is the National Martyr's Monument in Savar, the designs of the previous series of the Bangladeshi taka notes and its postage stamps, three spotted deer, and the magpie-robin (doyel). On the reverse is the headquarters of the Security Printing Corporation. Curiously, this note has an electrotype 10 in the watermark, indicating it was likely printed on extra ৳10 banknote paper.

On 8 July 2013, Bangladesh Bank issued a ৳100 note to commemorate the 100th anniversary of the Bangladesh National Museum. The commemorative note features an 18th-century terracotta plaque of a horseman on the front and the Bangladesh National Museum on the back.

== Coins ==
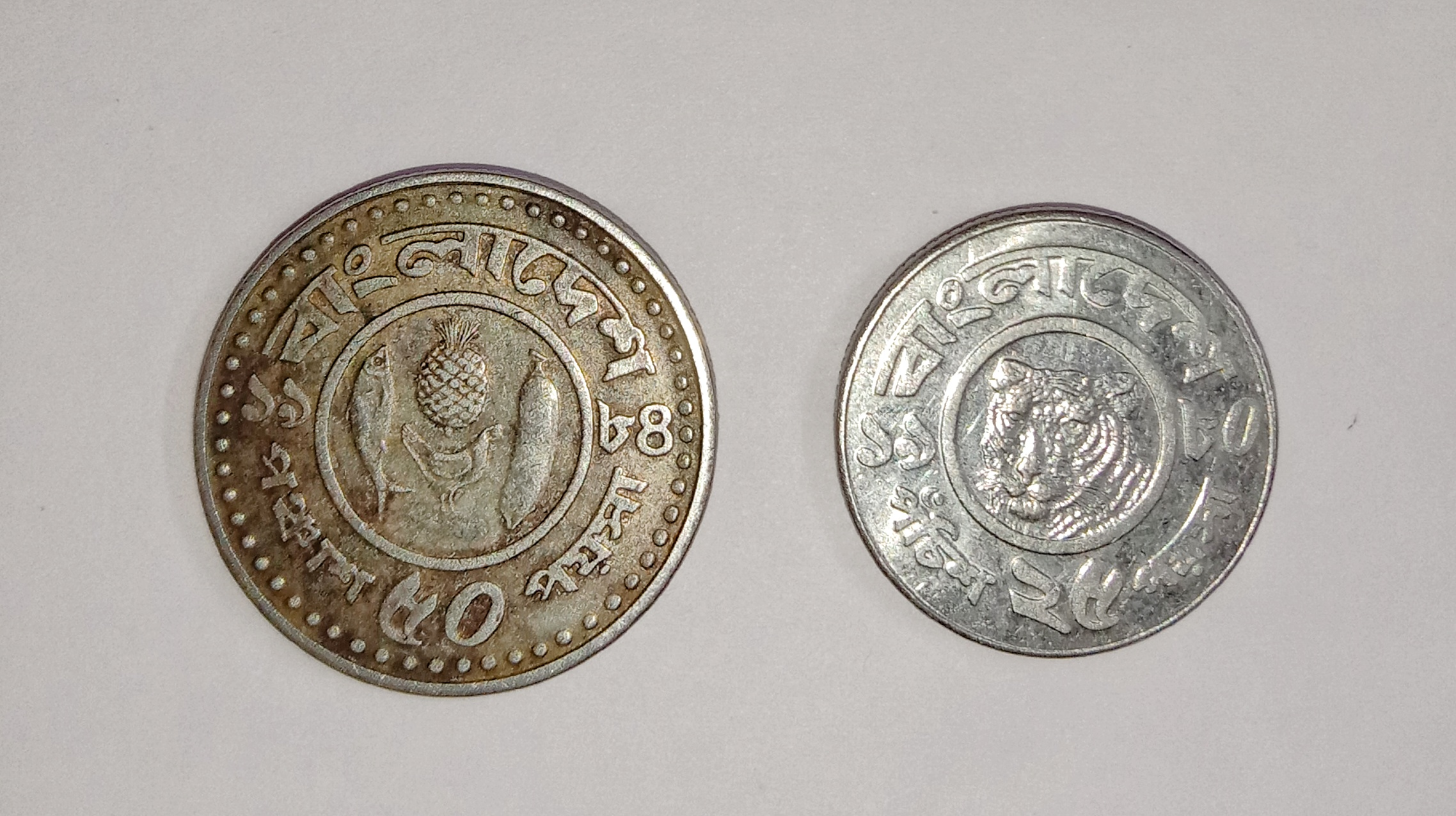
50 poysha from 1984 (left) and 25 poysha from 1980 (right)

In 1973, coins were introduced in denominations of 5, 10, 25, and 50 poysha. 1 poysha coins followed in 1974, with ৳1 coins introduced in 1975. The 1, 5, and 10 poysha were struck in aluminium, with the 25 and 50 poysha struck in steel and the ৳1 in copper-nickel. The 5 poysha were square with rounded corners, and the 10 poysha were scalloped. Steel ৳5 were introduced in 1994, and a steel ৳2 coin followed in 2004.

1 and 5 poysha coins are rarely found in circulation. The same is the case with the 10, 25, and 50 poysha coins, as they have lost value due to inflation over the years. Only the ৳1, ৳2, and ৳5 are occasionally found in circulation. Unlike most other countries, coins are not issued every year. The most recent coins, ৳2 and ৳5, were issued in 2013, and ৳1 was issued in 2014.

1973 Series
Value	Composition	Description		First Minted
Value	Composition	Reverse	Obverse	First Minted
5 poysha	Aluminium	National emblem	A plough inside a cogwheel engraved diagonally, "5-Five Poisha" and "Bangladesh" written in Bangla.	1973
10 poysha	Aluminium	National emblem	Scalloped with serrated edges, a betel leaf in the middle with "Bangladesh" written on top, and "Ten 10 poisha" written on the bottom in Bangla.	1973
25 poysha	Steel	National emblem	Curly pattern on the edges with a Rohu fish in the middle, "Bangladesh" written on top, and "Twenty-five 25 poisha" written at the bottom in Bangla.	1973
50 poysha	Steel	National emblem	Dotted pattern on the edges with a dove/pigeon in the middle, "Bangladesh" written on the top, and "Fifty 50 poisha" written at the bottom in Bangla.	1973
1974 Series (FAO)
1 poysha	Aluminium	National emblem	Ornamental design, floral patterns	1974
5 poysha	Aluminium	National emblem	A plough in the middle of a half-cogwheel saying the words "Increase production"	1974
10 poysha	Aluminium	National emblem	Serrated on scalloped edges, with flowers, plants, and a running tractor with text saying "Green Revolution"	1974
25 poysha	Steel	National emblem	Fish, egg, bananas, and a gourd with the text "Food for all"	1974
50 poysha	Various	National emblem	Fish, banana, chicken, and pineapple in the middle circle	1977
1977 Series (FAO)
5 poysha	Aluminium	National emblem	Plough and cogwheel	1977
10 poysha	Aluminium	National emblem	A family sitting facing each other	1977
25 poysha	Steel	National emblem	Royal Bengal tiger	1977
50 poysha	Steel	National emblem	Hilsha fish, chicken, pineapple, banana	1977
Other Issues
50 poysha (small)	Steel	National emblem	Hilsha fish, chicken, pineapple, banana	2001
৳1 (Line-edged)	Steel	National emblem	A family figure, slogan "Planned family – Food for All"	2002
৳1 (Silver Jubilee Edition)	Brass	National emblem	A family figure, slogan "Planned family – Food for All"	1996
৳2	Steel	National emblem	Education for All slogan with two children studying	2004
৳5	Steel	National emblem	Jamuna Multipurpose Bridge	1994
Last Issues
৳1	Steel	National Emblem	Sheikh Mujibur Rahman	2010
৳2	Steel	National Emblem	Sheikh Mujibur Rahman	2010
৳5	Steel	National Emblem	Bangladesh Bank logo	2012
Special Issues (Uncirculated)
৳1 (Martyr's Edition)	Silver	Picture of the National Martyrs' Memorial and text which says "20th Victory Day of Bangladesh–1991"	A picture of the Bir Sreshtho with words "16th December–20th Victory Day"	1991
৳1 (Summer Olympics Edition)	Silver	National Emblem	Two athletes running with a fire torch with text "25th Olympic Games 1992"	1992
৳1	Silver	National Emblem	Two spotted deer with the heading "Endangered Wildlife"	1993
৳10 (Silver Jubilee of BB)	Silver	National Emblem	Picture of Bangladesh Bank with the title "Bangladesh Bank Silver Jubilee 1971–1996"	1996
৳10 (Silver Jubilee of BD)	Silver	National Martyrs' Memorial with the text "Silver Jubilee of Bangladesh's Victory"	Sheikh Mujibur Rahman with the same text on the coin's back	1996
৳10 (Bangabandhu Bridge Edition)	90% Silver and 10% Nickel	Martyr Statue with the title "Invincible Bangla" and heading "Inauguration of Bangabandhu Bridge 1998"	Picture of Bangabandhu Bridge with the same heading on the coin's reverse	1998
৳20 (Bangabandhu Bridge Edition)	Silver	Sheikh Mujibur Rahman with the heading "Inauguration of Bangabandhu Bridge 1998"	Picture of Bangabandhu Bridge with the same heading on the coin's reverse	1998
৳20 (IMD Edition)	Gold	Shaheed Minar with the date 21 February with heading International Mother Language Day	Logo of Bangladesh Bank	2000
৳10 (World Cup Edition)	Silver	The picture of the World cup with "Bangladesh Bank" written	ICC World Cup Logo with being held in Bangladesh in 2011	2011
৳10 (Rabindranath Edition)	Silver	A poem of Rabindranath Tagore and his autograph	Picture of Rabindranath Tagore with the title "150th Birth Anniversary of Rabindranath Tagore"	2011
৳10 (Bidrohi Edition)	Silver	A quotation from the poem Bidrohi and the autograph of the National Poet	Picture of young Kazi Nazrul Islam with the heading "90 Years of the poem Bidrohi 1921–2011"	2011
৳10 (Victory Edition)	Silver	Picture of 6 Muktijoddha waving guns with the title "40th Victory Anniversary of Bangladesh"	Picture of Sheikh Mujibur Rahman with the 7th March Speech quote with his name in English at the bottom	2011
৳100 (Museum Edition)	Silver	Logo of Bangladesh Bank with Bangla writing "Centenary of Bangladesh National Museum 1913–2013"	100 taka written on left and right with a terracotta plaque of 18th century horsemen	2013
৳100 (Mujib Centennial Edition)	Gold and Silver (dual variant)	Logo of Bangladesh Bank with text "Father of the Nation Bangabandhu Sheikh Mujibur Rahman"	Portrait of Sheikh Mujibur Rahman with the text in Bangla	2020
৳50 (Golden Jubilee Edition)	Scallop-shaped in Gold	Big number "50" which has the logo of Bangladesh Bank inscribed in the number "0" with the heading "Golden Jubilee of Independence"	Portrait of Sheikh Mujibur Rahman with the text in Bangla	2021
৳50 (Japan-Bangladesh Relations Edition)	Silver	National Martyrs' Memorial with the heading "Bangladesh-Japan Diplomatic Relations 50th Year Anniversary"	The same heading written in the middle with a logo and pictures of a cherry blossom on top and a water lily at the bottom	2022
৳100 (Padma Bridge Edition)	Scallop-shaped, silver	Picture of the Padma Bridge with the title "Padma Bridge–The symbol of National Pride" written in English	Portrait of Sheikh Mujibur Rahman with the title in Bangla	2023
**Poisha coins no longer minted since 2013 but all coins above 1 taka still legal tender.

== Banknotes ==
There had been eleven series of taka banknotes since the issuance of the first series in 1972. Banknotes generally feature the heritage sites (mostly mosques), national monuments, and portrayals of the village life, agriculture, industry, and animals of the country. Apart from this, the portrait of Sheikh Mujibur Rahman, the founding president of Bangladesh, was featured on the obverse in the series issued under the Awami League governments.

=== Latest series ===
Following the fall of the Awami League in the July Uprising in 2024, the Bangladesh Bank announced plans to redesign Taka banknotes by 2025. The central bank's Currency and Design Advisory Committee, made up of nine members, was selected to submit theme proposals to the Ministry of Finance. Sheikh Mujibur Rahman's portrait was removed, and graffiti of the July Uprising was added in this series.

Historical and Archaeological Architecture of Bangladesh Series
Image		Value	Main Color	Description		First Issue
Obverse	Reverse	Value	Main Color	Obverse	Reverse	First Issue
		৳2	Light Green	Martyred Intellectuals Memorial, Mirpur	Martyred Intellectuals Memorial, Rayer Bazar	5 June 2025
		৳5	Pink	Star Mosque	Graffiti of the July Uprising	19 May 2026
		৳10	Pink	Baitul Mukarram National Mosque	Graffiti of the July Uprising	3 February 2026
		৳20	Cyan	Kantajew Temple	Somapura Mahavihara	1 June 2025
		৳50	Deep Brown	Ahsan Manzil	The Struggle by Zainul Abedin	1 June 2025
		৳100	Sky Blue	Sixty Dome Mosque	The Sundarbans	12 August 2025
		৳200	Golden Yellow	Aparajeyo Bangla	Graffiti of the July Uprising	5 June 2025
		৳500	Olive Green	Central Shaheed Minar	Supreme Court of Bangladesh	4 December 2025
		৳1000	Violet	National Martyrs' Memorial	Jatiya Sangsad Bhaban	1 June 2025

== Exchange rates ==
=== Current exchange rates ===
Current BDT exchange rates
From Google Finance:	AUD CAD CHF CNY EUR GBP HKD JPY USD
From Yahoo! Finance:	AUD CAD CHF CNY EUR GBP HKD JPY USD
From XE.com:	AUD CAD CHF CNY EUR GBP HKD JPY USD
From OANDA:	AUD CAD CHF CNY EUR GBP HKD JPY USD

=== Historic exchange rates ===
Upon Bangladesh's independence, the value of the Bangladeshi taka was set between ৳7.5 and ৳8.0 to US$1. Except for fiscal year 1978, the taka's value relative to the US dollar declined every year from 1971 through the end of 1987. To help offset this phenomenon, Bangladesh first used the compensatory financing facility of the International Monetary Fund in fiscal year 1974. Despite the increasing need for assistance, the Mujib government was initially unwilling to meet the IMF's conditions on monetary and fiscal policy. By fiscal year 1975, however, the government revised its stance, declaring a devaluation of the taka by 56 percent and agreeing to establish the Bangladesh Aid Group by the World Bank.

Between 1980 and 1983, the taka sustained a decline of some 50 percent because of a deterioration in Bangladesh's balance of payments. Between 1985 and 1987, the taka was adjusted in frequent incremental steps, stabilising again around 12 percent lower in real terms against the US dollar, but at the same time narrowing the difference between the official rate and the preferential secondary rate from 15 percent to 7.5 percent. Accompanying this structural adjustment was an expansion in trade conducted at the secondary rate, to 53 percent of total exports and 28 percent of total imports. In mid-1987, the official rate was relatively stable, approaching less than ৳31 to US$1. In January 2011, US$1 was equivalent to approximately ৳72; as of 21 April 2012, US$1 was worth close to ৳82; and as of 9 September 2015 US$1 valued at ৳77.

Bangladeshi taka per currency unit averaged over the year (January of every year)
Currency	ISO code	1971	1981	1991	1996	2000	2001	2005	2007	2008	2009	2010	2011	2012	2013	2014	2015	2024(Aug)
U.S. dollar	USD	7.86	18.31	36.75	40.8	50.82	53.84	58.11	67.29	67.34	67.40	68.11	69.84	81.64	78.31	76.45	78.85	117.52
Japanese yen	JPY	0.02	0.09	0.27	0.38	0.48	0.46	0.56	0.55	0.62	0.74	0.74	0.84	1.06	0.88	0.73	0.64	0.80
Soviet ruble (until 1993); Russian ruble (1993 – present)	SUR; RUB	14.93	29.00	55.12	8.16	1.85	1.91	2.17	2.62	2.79	2.14	2.31	2.35	2.66	2.63	2.29	1.20	1.30
Euro	EUR	–	–	–	–	51.48	50.57	76.37	87.45	98.99	90.01	97.28	93.26	105.26	103.98	104.22	89.26	128.41
Pound sterling	GBP	18.92	44.02	71.01	62.48	83.23	79.59	109.35	131.74	132.6	97.66	110.01	110.04	126.57	125.19	125.90	116.13	150.08
Swiss franc	CHF	1.8	10.08	28.89	34.63	31.97	33.07	49.38	53.73	60.99	60.23	65.87	73.1	86.91	84.7	84.66	81.26	135.28
Hong Kong dollar	HKD	1.31	3.53	4.68	5.28	6.53	6.9	7.45	8.62	8.62	8.69	8.77	8.97	10.51	10.1	9.85	9.86	15.08
Malaysian ringgit	MYR	2.55	8.23	13.54	15.97	13.37	14.16	15.25	19.12	20.54	18.86	20.06	22.71	26.14	25.68	23.14	21.41	26.37
Kuwaiti dinar	KWD	22.09	64.51	128.73	136.25	167.01	176.05	197.82	231.69	245.83	235.31	236.52	247.62	292.46	277.6	270.16	259.66	383.78
Saudi riyal	SAR	1.75	5.5	9.79	10.88	13.55	14.35	15.49	17.93	17.92	17.95	18.14	18.6	21.76	20.87	20.38	20.36	31.31
Emirate dirham	AED	1.65	4.89	9.96	11.11	13.84	14.65	15.82	18.31	18.33	18.34	18.54	19.01	22.22	21.31	20.81	20.82	32

== See also ==
- Economy of Bangladesh
- The Security Printing Corporation (Bangladesh) Ltd.
- Banknotes of the Bangladeshi taka
