= Star Mosque =

Mosque in Armanitola, Dhaka, Bangladesh

- তারা মসজিদ
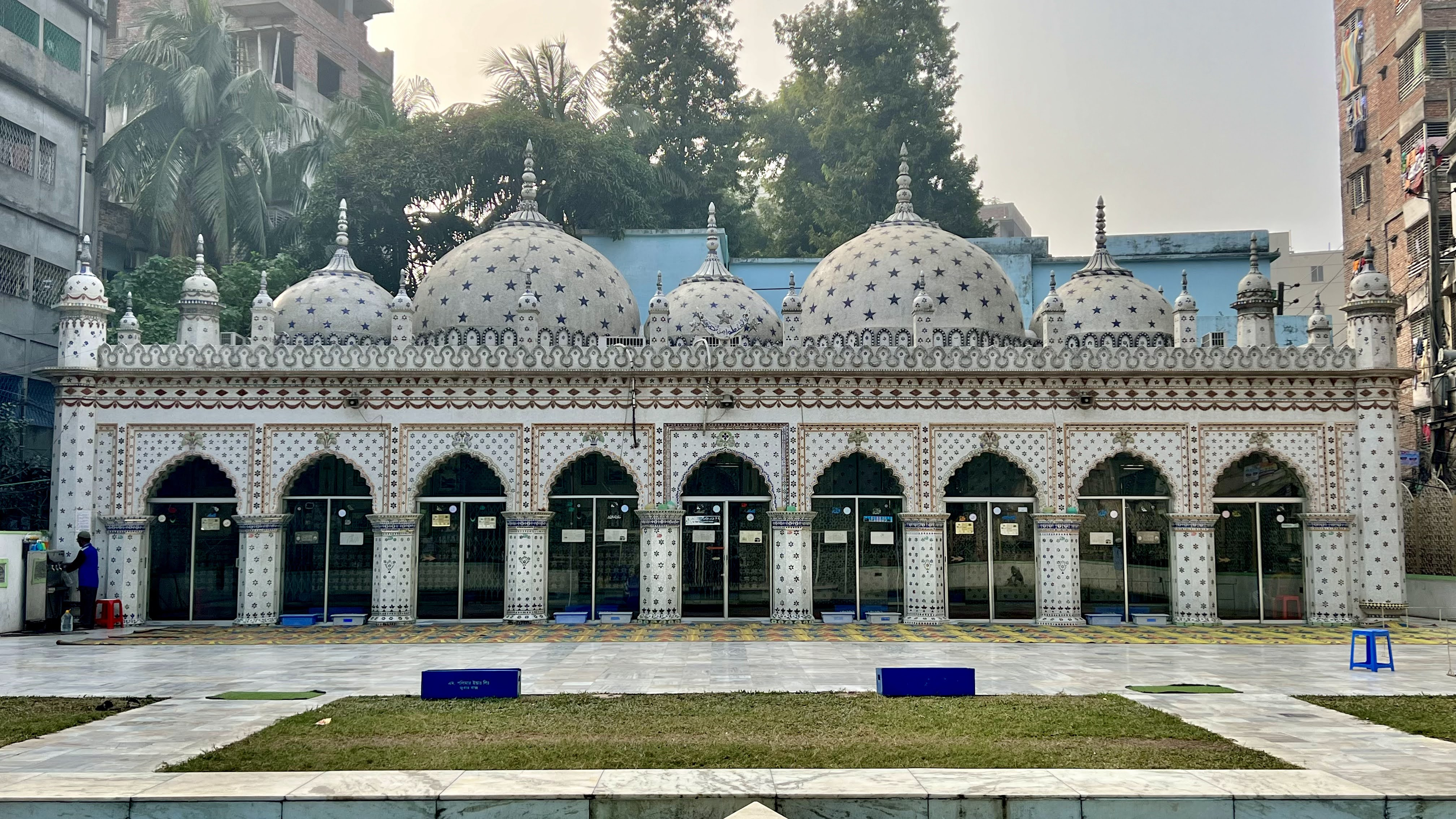
- Star Mosque in January 2023

- Location within Dhaka Location within Dhaka division Location within Bangladesh

Religion
- Affiliation: Islam
- District: Dhaka District

Location
- Location: Abul Khairat Rd, Armanitola, Dhaka
- Country: Bangladesh
- Coordinates: 23°42′56″N 90°24′06″E

Architecture
- Type: Mosque
- Style: Islamic architecture

Specifications
- Length: 21.34 m
- Width: 7.98 m
- Dome: 5
- Minaret: 4

Star Mosque (also known as Tara Masjid) is a mosque located in Armanitola area, Dhaka, Bangladesh. The mosque has ornate designs and is decorated with motifs of blue stars. It was built in the first half of the 19th century by Mirza Golam Pir (Mirza Ahmed Jan). It is also the image on the ৳100 note on the Bangladeshi taka currency.

== History ==
A local nobleman, Mirza Ghulam Pir (d. 1860), originally built the mosque and hence it was known as Mirza Ghulam Pir Mosque. In 1926, a businessman named Ali Jan Bepari renovated the mosque, adding stars and other motifs, which gave the mosque its present name Tara (also Sitara) Masjid.

== Architecture ==
Built in the Mughal style by Mirza Ghulam in the late 18th century, this mosque was originally a simple rectangular mosque, measuring 33' x 11' with three doorways on the east façade (main façade) and one on the north wall and another on the south wall. Three domes crowned the mosque, the central one being the larger. Towers accented the corners and the façades displayed plastered panel decoration. In the early 20th century, Ali Jan Bepari financed its renovation when a front verandah was added. The surface was redone in 'Chini Tikri', a popular broken china decoration. The mosque is one of the very few examples of exclusive chinitikri mosaic, found in the striking blue star mosaic, which gave the mosque its name Star Mosque. In 1987, the prayer hall was extended by the Department of Architecture to include two more domes. It was decorated with imported china clay tiles and used both methods of applying chinitikri and used solid colour, cut clay tiles and formed patterns by placing the coloured tiles in white plaster. The domes and the exterior are covered with different coloured star shaped china clay tiles. The upper portion of the eastern façade also incorporates a crescent motif. The work assumed another texture by using assorted glazed tiles on the interior. The three mihrabs and the doorways are decorated with mosaic floral pattern. A plant and vase motif is repeated as a decorative element on the pendentive and the interior of the verandah wall.

=== Exterior decoration ===
In the early 20th century, Ali Jan Bepari, a local businessman, financed the renovation of the mosque and added a new eastern verandah. The surface was redecorated with Chinitikri work (mosaic work of broken China porcelain pieces), a decorative style that was popular during the 1930s. The mosque, which previously lacked any historical significance, is one of the few remaining architectural examples of the Chinitikri (Chinese pieces) method of mosaic decoration. This decorative technique is found in the striking star motif that is in part the reason for the mosque's current acclaim and popular name, Star Mosque or Sitara Masjid. In 1987, the Ministry of Religious Affairs commissioned Giasul Huque and Zahiruddin to make additions to the prayer hall, which was extended to include two more domes.

The mosque is decorated with Japanese and English china clay tiles and used both methods of the Chinitikri application. One approach uses solid colour, cut clay tiles and forms patterns through the placement of these coloured tiles in white plaster. The domes and the exterior surface are covered with different coloured star shaped China clay tiles. The upper portion of the eastern façade also incorporates a crescent motif.

=== Interior decoration ===
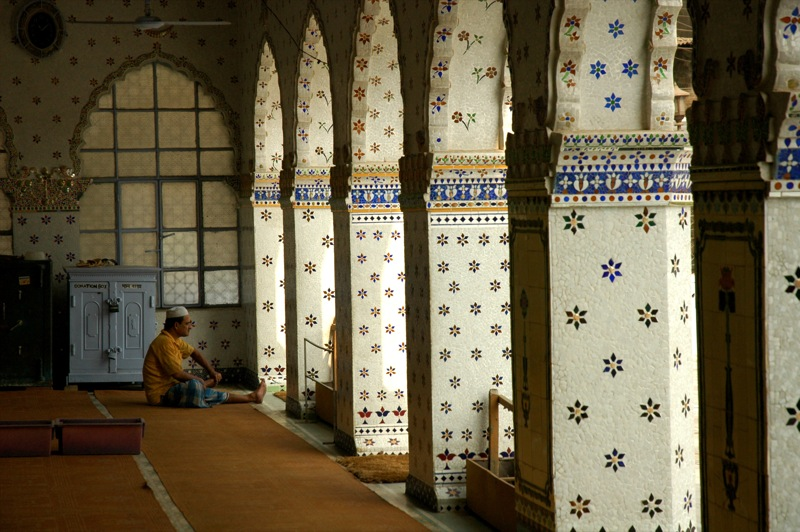
Interior of the mosque

Chinitikri tile work assumes another texture by using assorted pieces of different designs of glazed tiles on the interior surfaces of the mosque. The three mihrabs and the doorways are decorated with mosaic floral pattern. A plant and vase motif is repeated as a decorative element on the pendentives as well as on the interior of the verandah wall. As a decorative element, the Japanese Fujiyama motif is found on the surface between the doors.

== Historical images ==
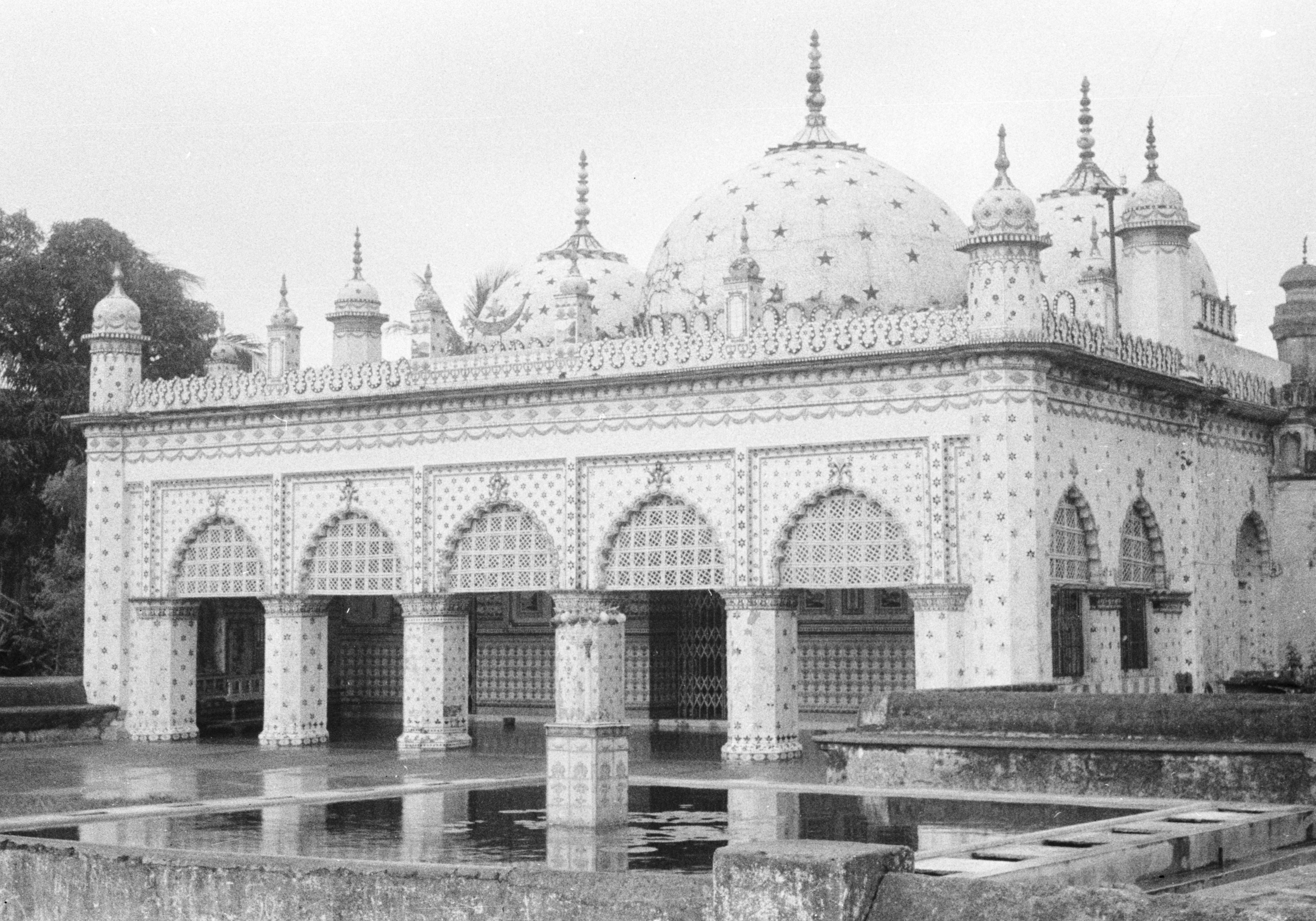
Front of the mosque (1967)

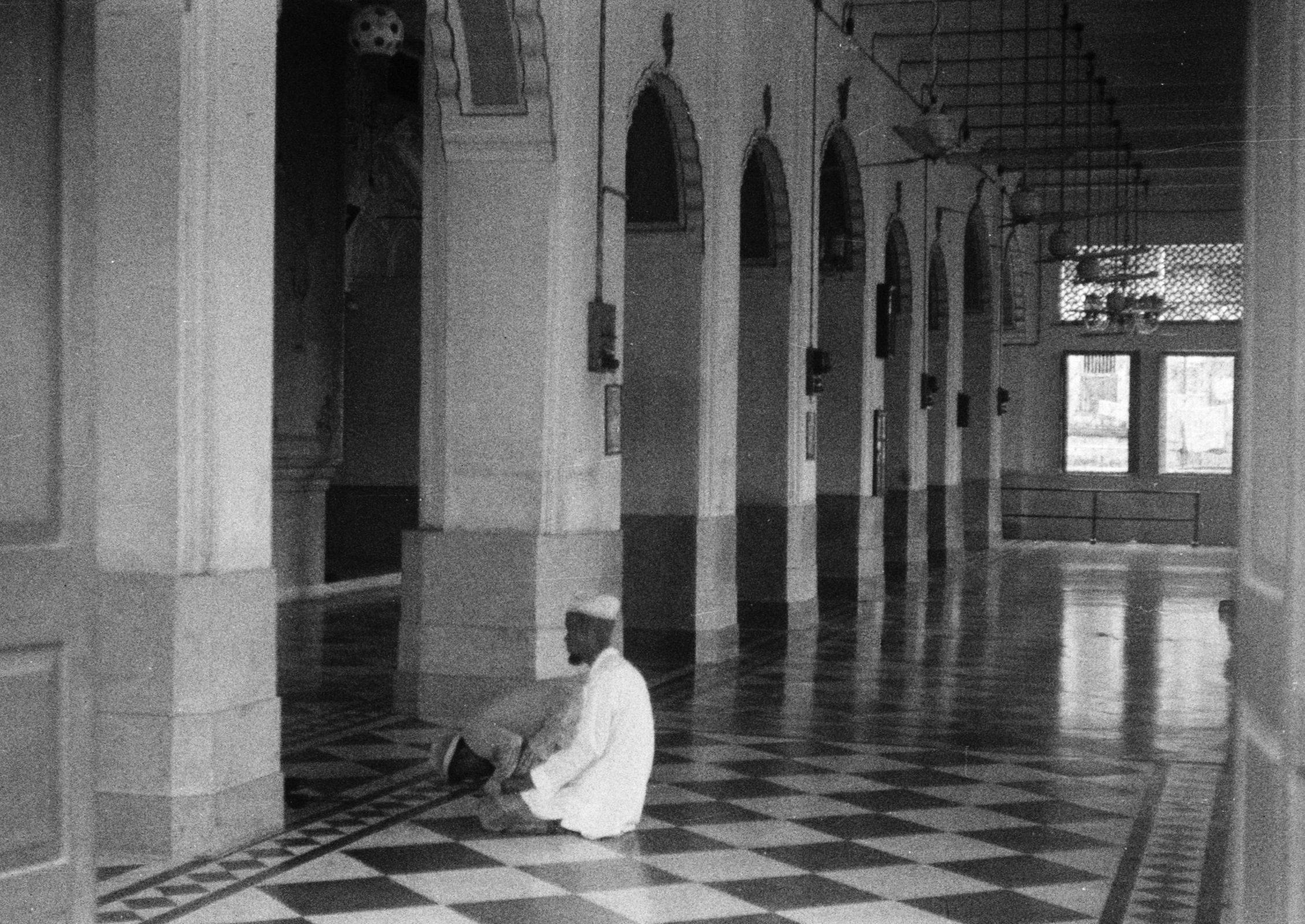
Veranda (1967)
