= National Martyrs' Memorial =

National monument located in Savar, Bangladesh

- জাতীয় স্মৃতিসৌধ
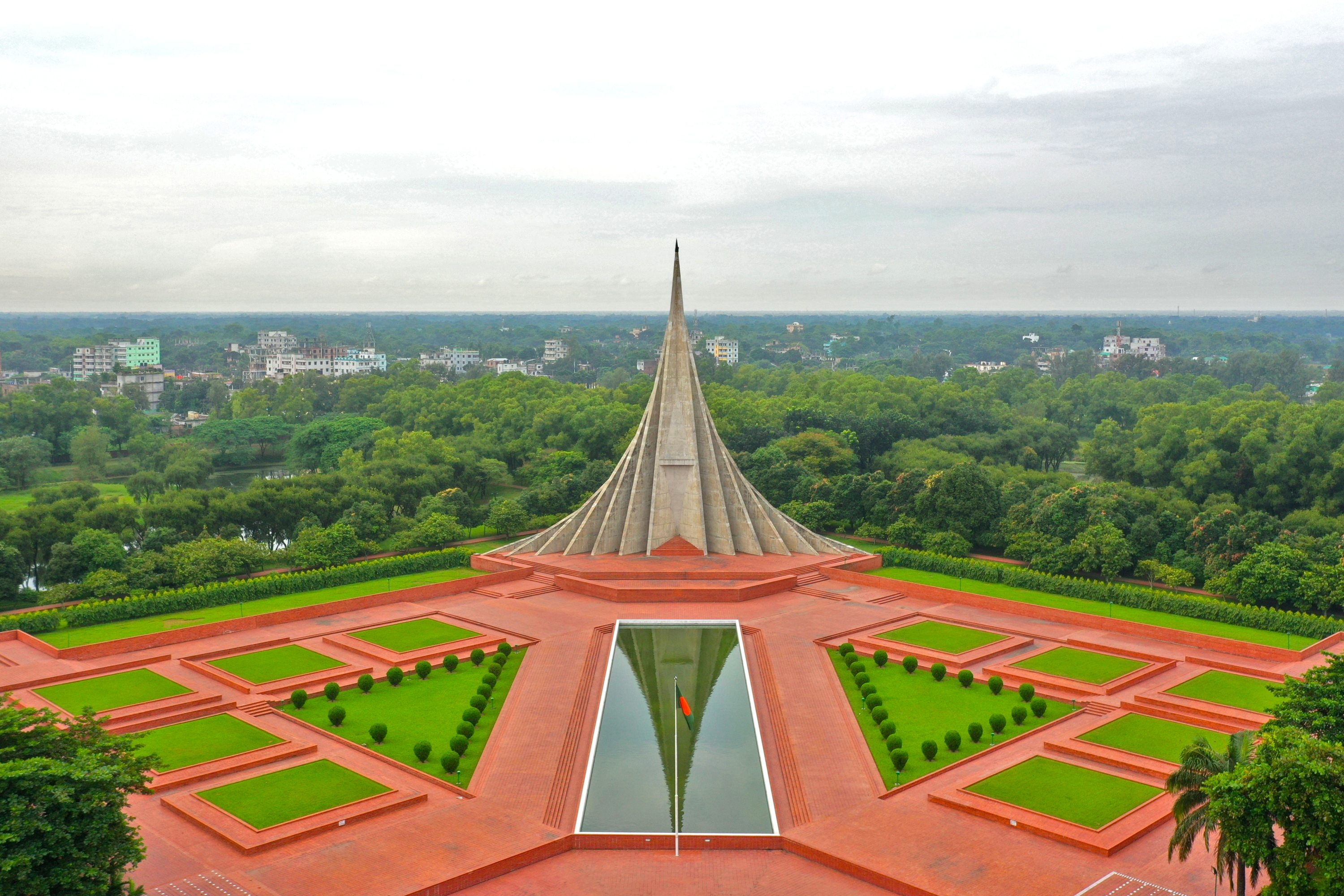
- Interactive map of the National Martyrs' Memorial area

General information
- Status: Completed
- Type: Public monument
- Location: Savar, Dhaka, Bangladesh
- Coordinates: 23°54′40.4″N 90°15′17.4″E
- Construction started: 1978
- Completed: 1982

Height
- Roof: 150 feet (46 m)

Design and construction
- Architect: Syed Mainul Hossain
- Main contractor: Concord Group

The National Martyrs' Memorial (Bengali: জাতীয় স্মৃতিসৌধ, romanized: Jātīẏô Smr̥tisôudhô) is a national monument in Bangladesh. It was built to honour and remember those who died during the Bangladesh Liberation War (as well as the genocide) in 1971, which resulted in Bangladesh's independence from Pakistan. The monument is located in Savar, about 35 km northwest of the capital city, Dhaka. It was designed by Syed Mainul Hossain and built by Concord Group.

== History ==
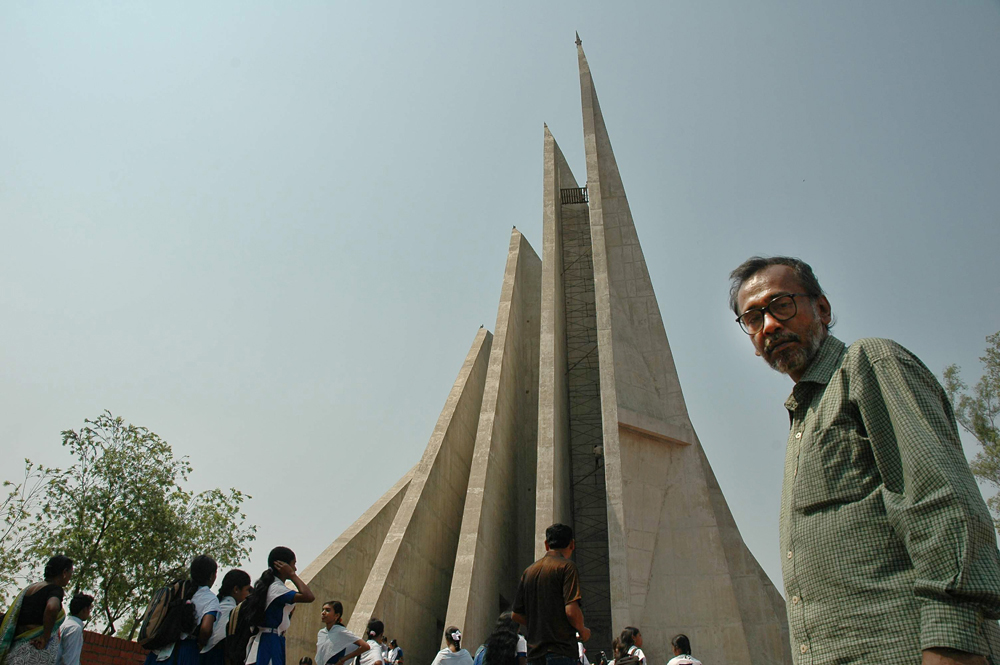
Syed Mainul Hossain standing by the National Martyrs' Memorial (which he designed)

Plans for the monument were initiated in 1976. Following the selection of Savar as the main site (about 35 km northwest of the capital city, Dhaka), a nationwide design competition was held in June 1978. Following evaluation of the 57 submissions, Syed Mainul Hossain's design was chosen.

== Architecture ==
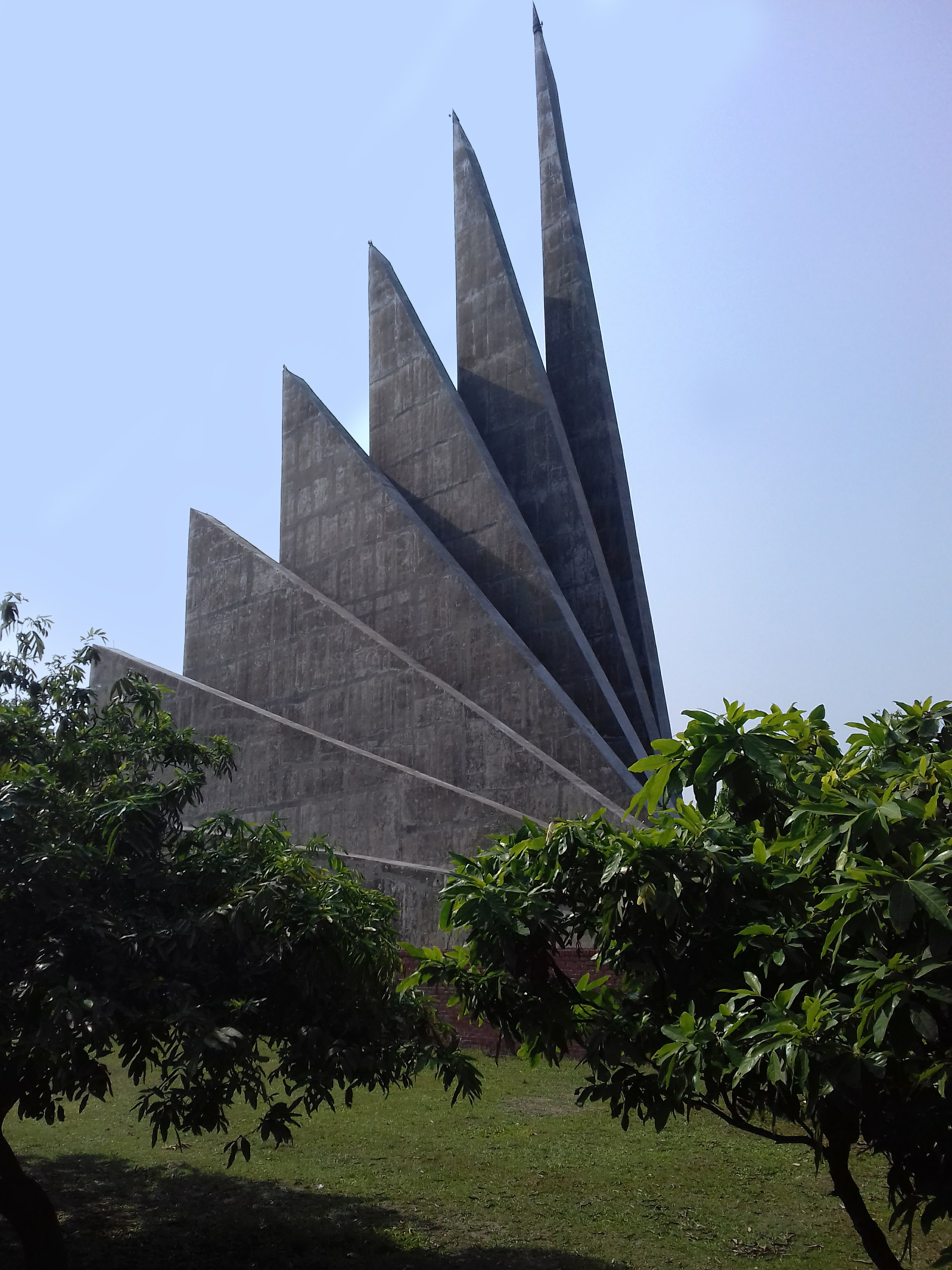
the memorial from close

The monument consists of seven pairs of triangular walls or prisms. The outermost pair is the shortest but also the widest in span, while the inner pairs gradually change in proportion, with the innermost pair forming the structure's peak. Each of these seven pairs of walls represents a significant chapter in the history of Bangladesh, namely the 1952 Bengali language movement, the 1954 provincial election victory of the United Front, the 1956 Constitution Movement, the 1962 East Pakistan Education movement, the 1966 six point movement, the 1969 mass uprising, and the climactic event of the 1971 Liberation War (through which Bangladesh became an independent sovereign state). The architecture and landscaping are designed to evoke the resilience and struggle of the Bangladeshi people during the war.

== Gallery ==
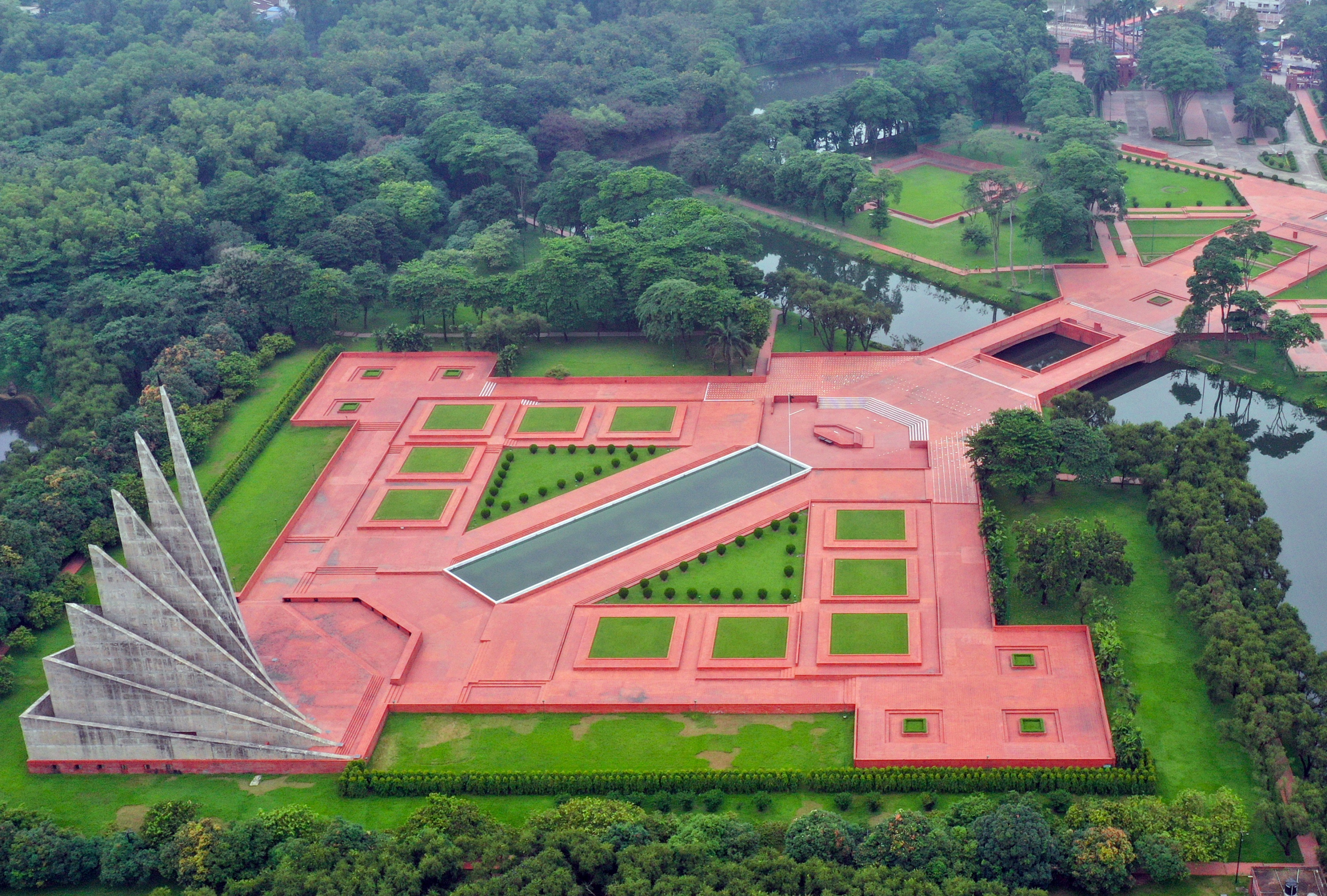

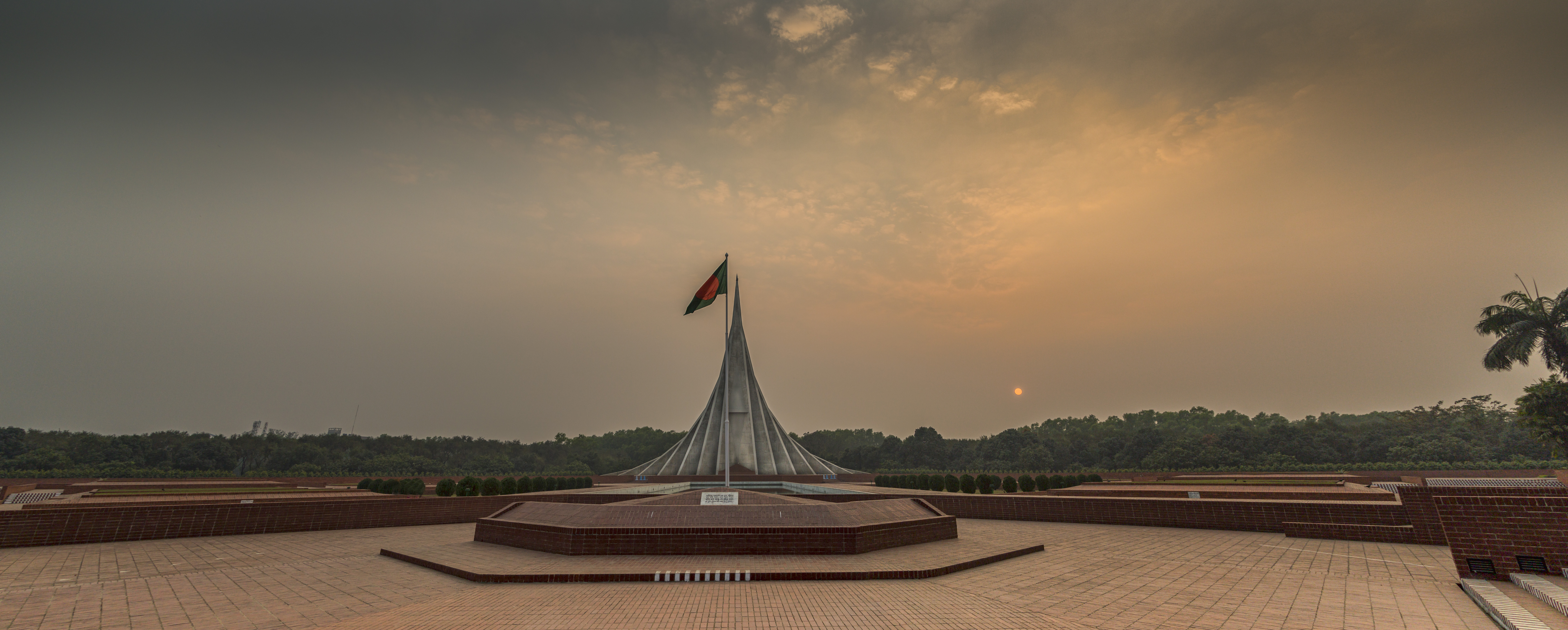

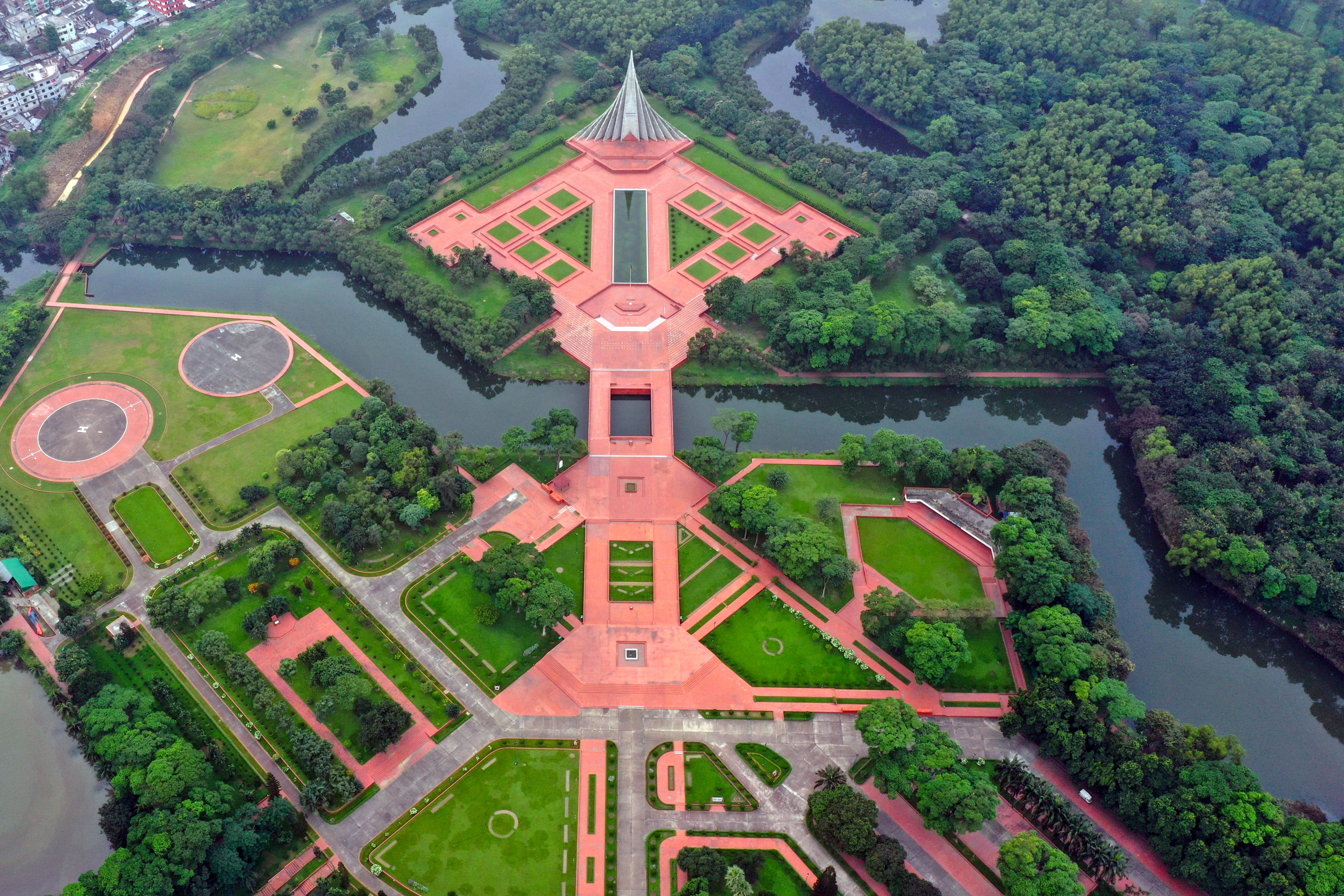

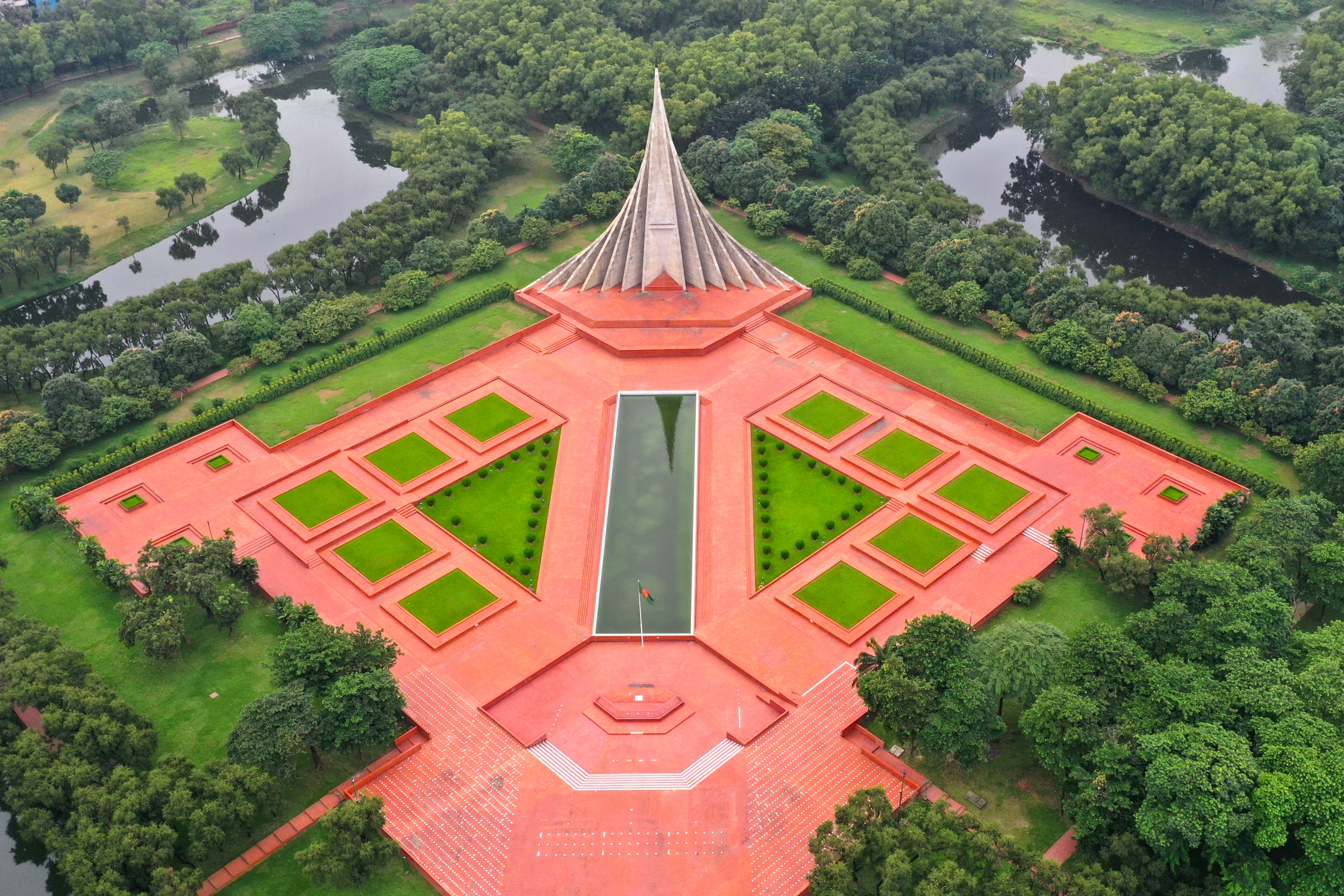

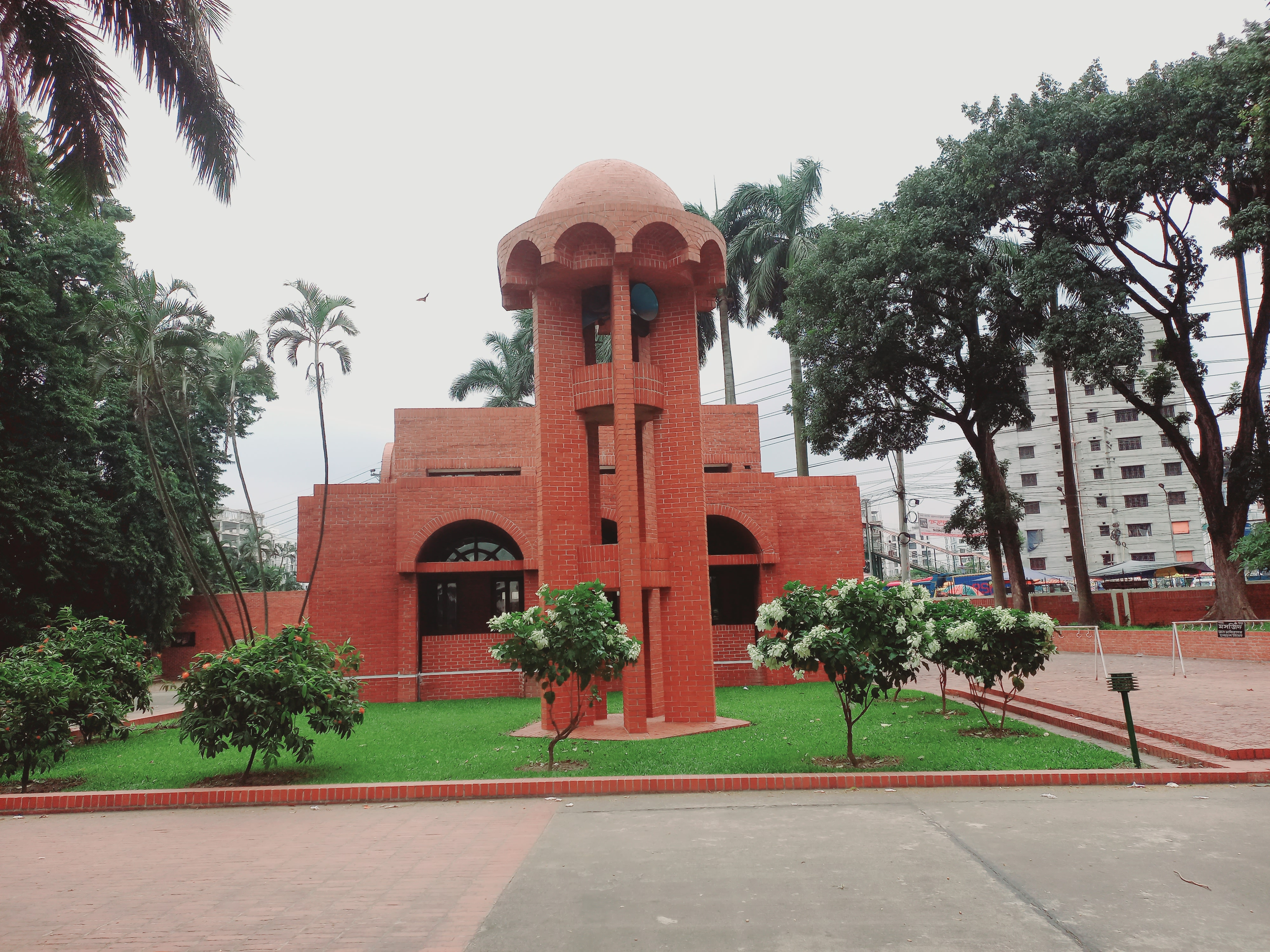
National Martyrs' Monument Jame Masjid

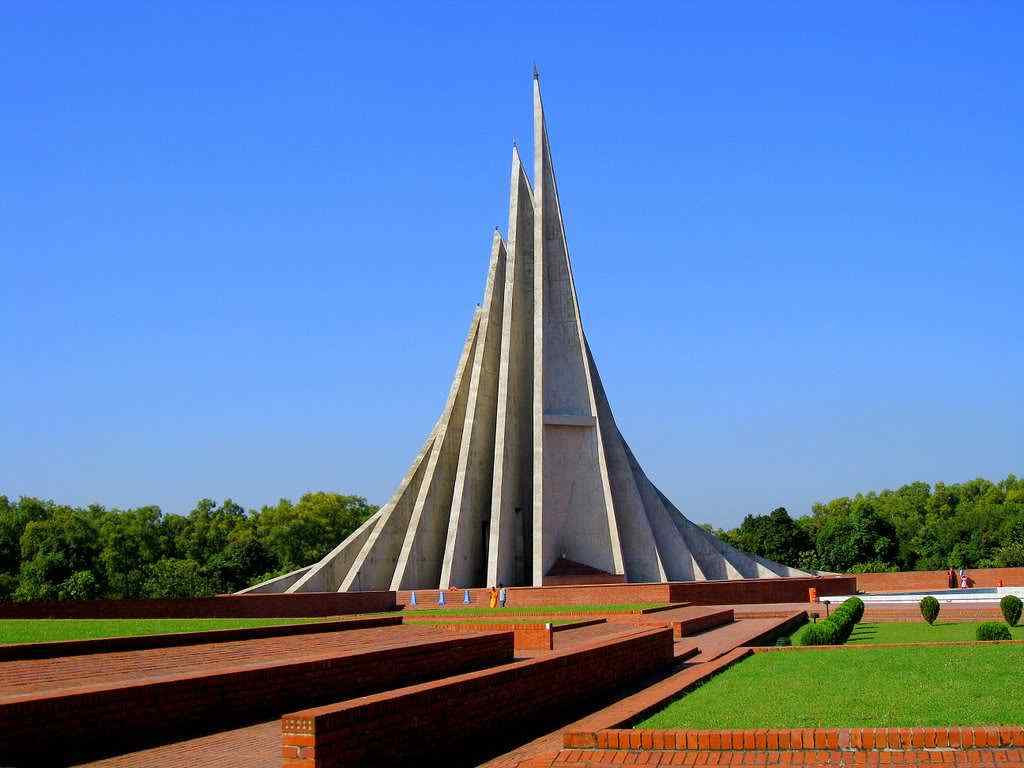

== See also ==
- Architecture of Bangladesh
- Fazlur Rahman Khan
- List of national monuments of Bangladesh
