= National Emblem of Bangladesh =

National emblem the People's Republic of Bangladesh

National emblem of Bangladesh বাংলাদেশের জাতীয় প্রতীক

Versions
- Armiger: Bangladesh
- Adopted: 1972 (54 years ago)
- Shield: The national flower, the water lily resting on water, having on each side an ear of paddy and being surmounted by three connected leaves of jute with two stars on each side of the leaves.

The National Emblem of Bangladesh (বাংলাদেশের জাতীয় প্রতীক) is used by the government of Bangladesh and its agencies. The emblem appears on official government documents and currency.

The emblem was adopted shortly after independence in 1971. In the centre is a water lily, that is bordered on two sides by rice sheaves. Above the water lily are four stars and three connected jute leaves. The water lily is the country's national flower, and is representative of the many rivers that run through Bangladesh. The rice sheaves represent the staple food of Bangladesh, as well as the agriculture of that nation. The four stars symbolise the four founding principles of the Republic that were enshrined in the Constitution of Bangladesh: nationalism, socialism, democracy, and secularism.

The details of the emblem are inscribed in the constitution:

প্রজাতন্ত্রের জাতীয় প্রতীক হইতেছে উভয় পার্শ্বে ধান্যশীর্ষবেষ্টিত, পানিতে ভাসমান জাতীয় পুষ্প শাপলা, তাহার শীর্ষদেশে পাটগাছের তিনটি পরস্পর-সংযুক্ত পত্র, তাহার উভয় পার্শ্বে দুইটি করিয়া তারকা৷

— বাংলাদেশের সংবিধানের অনুচ্ছেদ ৪(৩)

The national emblem of the Republic is the national flower Shapla (Nymphaea nouchali) resting on water, having on each side an ear of paddy and being surmounted by three connected leaves of jute with two stars on each side of the leaves.

— Article 4(3), Constitution of Bangladesh

== Gallery ==
National Emblem of Bangladesh

National Emblem of Bangladesh Monochrome

Emblem of the President of Bangladesh

Seal of the President of Bangladesh

Emblem of the Prime Minister of Bangladesh

Seal of the Prime Minister of Bangladesh

Seal of the Chief Adviser of Bangladesh

Badge of Bengal Presidency during British Rule in India

Emblem of East Bengal

Emblem of East Pakistan (1956–1970)

Emblem of East Pakistan (1970–1971)

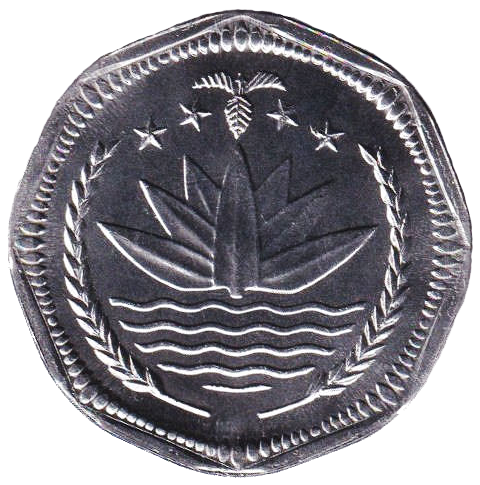
National Emblem of Bangladesh on coin (50 Poisha, 2001)

== See also ==
- Flag of Bangladesh
- Government Seal of Bangladesh
