= National symbols of Bangladesh =

The national symbols of Bangladesh consist of symbols to represent Bangladeshi traditions and ideals that reflect the different aspects of the cultural life and history. Bangladesh has several official national symbols, including a historic document, a flag, an emblem, an anthem, memorial towers, as well as several national heroes. There are also several other symbols, including the national animal, bird, flower, instrument and tree.

== Flag ==
The national flag of Bangladesh

The national flag of Bangladesh (বাংলাদেশের জাতীয় পতাকা), known as Red-Green, was officially adopted on 17 January 1972. It consists of a red disc on top of a green field, offset slightly toward the hoist so that it appears centred when the flag is flying. The red disc represents the sun rising over Bengal and also the blood of those who died for the independence of Bangladesh. The green field stands for the lushness of the land of Bangladesh. The flag is based on a similar flag used during the Bangladesh Liberation War of 1971, which had a yellow map of the country inside the red disc. In 1972 this map was deleted from the flag. One reason given was the difficulty of rendering the map correctly on both sides of the flag. The civil ensign and naval ensign place the national flag in the canton of a red or white field, respectively.

== Emblem ==
The national emblem of Bangladesh

The National Emblem of Bangladesh (বাংলাদেশের জাতীয় প্রতীক) was adopted shortly after independence in 1971. Located on the emblem is a water lily that is bordered on two sides by rice sheaves. Above the water lilly are four stars and three connected jute leaves. The water lily is the country's national flower and is representative of the many rivers that run through Bangladesh. Rice represents its presence as the staple food of Bangladesh, and for the agriculture of that nation. The four stars represent the four founding principles in the constitution of Bangladesh: nationalism, secularism, socialism, and democracy.

== Government seal ==
The government seal of Bangladesh

The Government Seal of Bangladesh (বাংলাদেশ সরকার সীলমোহর) is used by the Ministries of Bangladesh and the Government of Bangladesh on official documents. One version is used on the cover page of Bangladesh passports. The seal features the same design elements as the first flag of Bangladesh in a circular setting. The outer white ring is shown with the caption of the official name of the Government of the People's Republic of Bangladesh in Bengali: গণপ্রজাতন্ত্রী বাংলাদেশ সরকার with 4 red 5-pointed stars. In the centre of the seal is the map of the country on a red disc.

== Music ==
=== National anthem ===
Amar Sonar Bangla (আমার সোনার বাংলা, "My Golden Bengal") is a song written and composed by the Bengali poet Rabindranath Tagore, the first ten lines of which were adopted in 1972 as the national anthem of Bangladesh. The song was written in 1905 during the period of বঙ্গভঙ্গ Bônggôbhônggô (Partition of Bengal (1905)) – when the ruling British Empire had the province of Bengal split into two parts. This song, along with a host of others, was written by Tagore, a pioneer of the cultural and political movement against this partition. These songs were meant to rekindle the unified spirit of Bengal and to raise public consciousness against the communal political divide. The lyrics first appeared in the September issues of "Bongodorshon" and "Baul" simultaneously, in 1905. It is said that the music of this song was inspired by the Baul singer Gagan Harkara's song আমি কোথায় পাবো তারে "Ami Kothay Pabo Tare". The instrumental orchestra rendition was composed by Samar Das. The English translation was done by Syed Ali Ahsan.

=== National march ===
Notuner Gaan (Bengali: নতুনের গান, Natunēra gāna) is the national march (Bengali: রণ-সঙ্গীত) of Bangladesh. This song was written by Kazi Nazrul Islam, the national poet of Bangladesh (also known as 'rebel poet'), in 1929. It belongs to his famous book The Evening (Sôndhya: সন্ধ্যা). The music for this song was composed by Kazi Nazrul Islam. On 13 January 1972, the ministry of Bangladesh adopted this song as a national marching song at its first meeting after the country's independence. The first 21 lines of the song are typically played at all military ceremonies or functions in the country; it is also known as the national military song of Bangladesh.

=== Honour song ===
Ekusher Gaan (Bengali: একুশের গান "The Song of Twenty-first"), more popularly known (after its first line) as Amar Bhaier Rokte Rangano (Bengali: আমার ভাইয়ের রক্তে রাঙানো "My Brothers' Blood Spattered"), is a Bengali song written by Abdul Gaffar Choudhury to mark the Bengali language movement in East Pakistan in 1952. It was first published anonymously on the last page of a newspaper with the headline Ekusher Gaan, but was later published in Ekushey's February edition. The song is often recognized as the most influential song of the language movement, reminding numerous Bangladeshis about the conflicts of 1952. Every 21 February, people from all parts of Bangladesh head to the Shaheed Minar in the probhat feri, a barefoot march to the monument, to pay homage to those killed in the language movement demonstrations by singing this song. It is regarded by listeners of the BBC Bangla radio service as the third-best song in Bengali.

== Flora and fauna ==
Image	Description
	The water lily (Nymphaea nouchali) is the national flower of Bangladesh. Nymphaea nouchali is considered a medicinal plant in Indian Ayurvedic medicine under the name ambal; it was mainly used to treat indigestion. Recent experiments have confirmed that it has medicinal qualities as an antihepatotoxic and antidiabetic. Like all waterlilies or lotuses, its tubers and rhizomes can be used as food items; they are eaten usually boiled or roasted. In the case of N. nouchali, its tender leaves and flower peduncles are also valued as food.
	The jackfruit (Artocarpus heterophyllus) is the national fruit of Bangladesh. It is native to parts of South and Southeast Asia and widely cultivated in tropical regions of Bangladesh. The jackfruit tree is well suited to tropical lowlands, and its fruit is the largest tree-borne fruit, reaching as much as 80 pounds (36 kg) in weight, 36 inches (90 cm) in length, and 20 inches (50 cm) in diameter.
	The mango (Mangifera indica) is the national tree of Bangladesh. The mango is native to South Asia, from where it has been distributed worldwide to become one of the most cultivated fruits in the tropics. Its fruit and leaves are ritually used as floral decorations at weddings, public celebrations and religious ceremonies.
	The Bengal tiger (Panthera tigris tigris) is the national animal of Bangladesh. Its population has been estimated to be at approximately 440 tigers in Bangladesh. Tigers in Bangladesh are now relegated to the forests of the Sundarbans and the Chittagong Hill Tracts. The tiger replaces the lion as king of the beasts in cultures of eastern Asia, representing royalty, fearlessness and wrath. Members of the East Bengal Regiment of the Bangladesh Army are nicknamed 'Bengal Tigers'; the regiment's logo is a tiger face, and the Bangladesh Cricket Board's logo features a Bengal tiger.
	The ilish (Bengali: ইলিশ) or hilsha, also spelled elish (Tenualosa ilisha), is the national fish of Bangladesh. As it is anadromous in nature (an uncommon phenomenon in tropical waters), the ilish lives in the sea for most of its life, but migrates up to 1,200 km inland through rivers in the Indian sub-continent for spawning. Distances of 50–100 km are usually normal in the Bangladeshi rivers. The ilish is a popular fish to eat among the people of South Asia.
	The Oriental magpie-robin (Copsychus saularis) is the national bird of Bangladesh, where it is common and known as the doyel or doel (Bengali: দোয়েল). They are common birds in urban gardens as well as forests. They are particularly well known for their songs and were once popular as cagebirds. It is a widely used symbol in Bangladesh, appearing on some currency notes; a landmark in the capital city of Dhaka is referred to as the Doyel Chatwar (meaning: Doyel Square).

== National monuments and memorials ==
=== Shaheed Minar ===
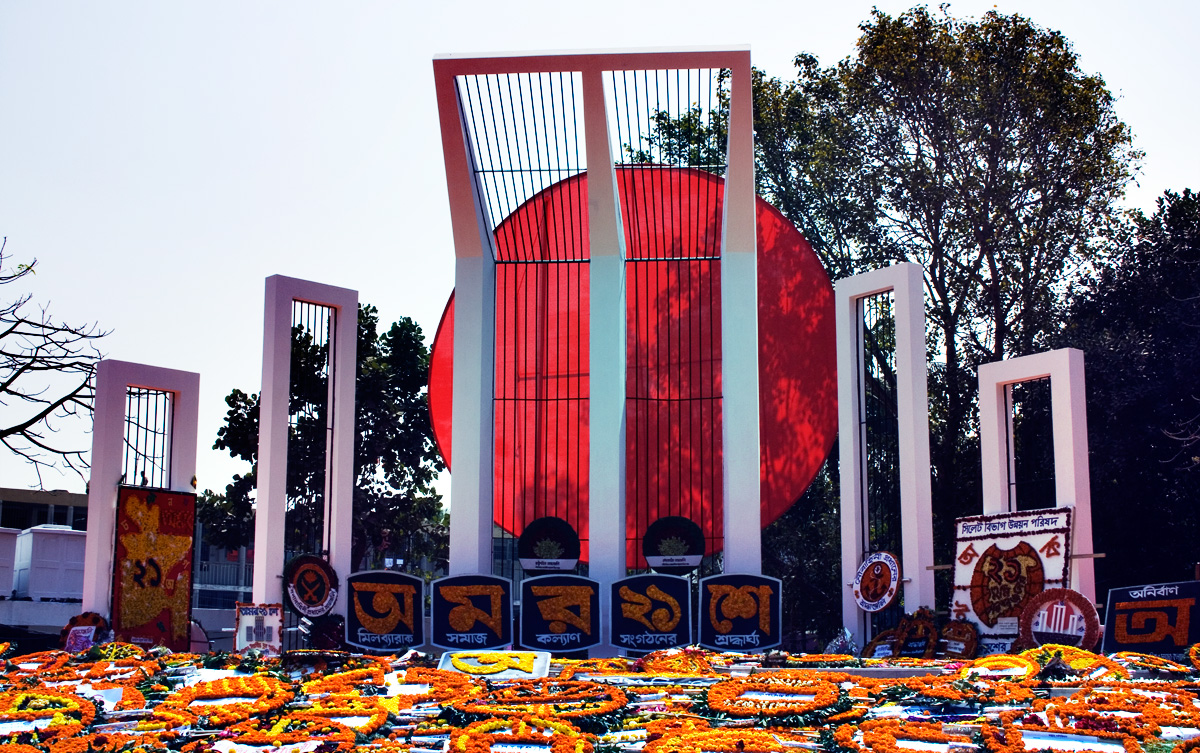
Central Shaheed Minar at the University of Dhaka

The Shaheed Minar (শহীদ মিনার Shôhid Minar lit. "Martyr Monument") is a national monument in Dhaka, Bangladesh, established to commemorate those killed during the Bengali language movement demonstrations of 1952. The enormous design includes half-circular columns to symbolize the mother, with her fallen sons, standing on the monument's central dais, and the red sun shining behind. The Central Shaheed Minar of Dhaka goes up to a height of 14 metres (46 ft) and was made with marble stones. The stairs and barrier are highlighted in white to create a divine look. The fence on both sides is painted with lines from poems of legendary poets in iron letters. As visitors enter the monument, they will find two statues of the patriots who sacrificed their lives in the demonstrations. There is also a 1,500-square-foot (140 m^{2}) mural representing the movement's history.

The language movement is one of the most significant movements in the history of Bangladesh. Thus, the Central Shaheed Minar epitomizes efforts to represent the spirit of Bengali nationalism and also highlight the importance of the Bengali language in the social and cultural progress of the country. It has a very significant place in the social and cultural mechanism of Bangladesh; all national, mourning, cultural and other activities held each year on 21 February have been centered around this monument.

=== National Martyrs' Memorial ===
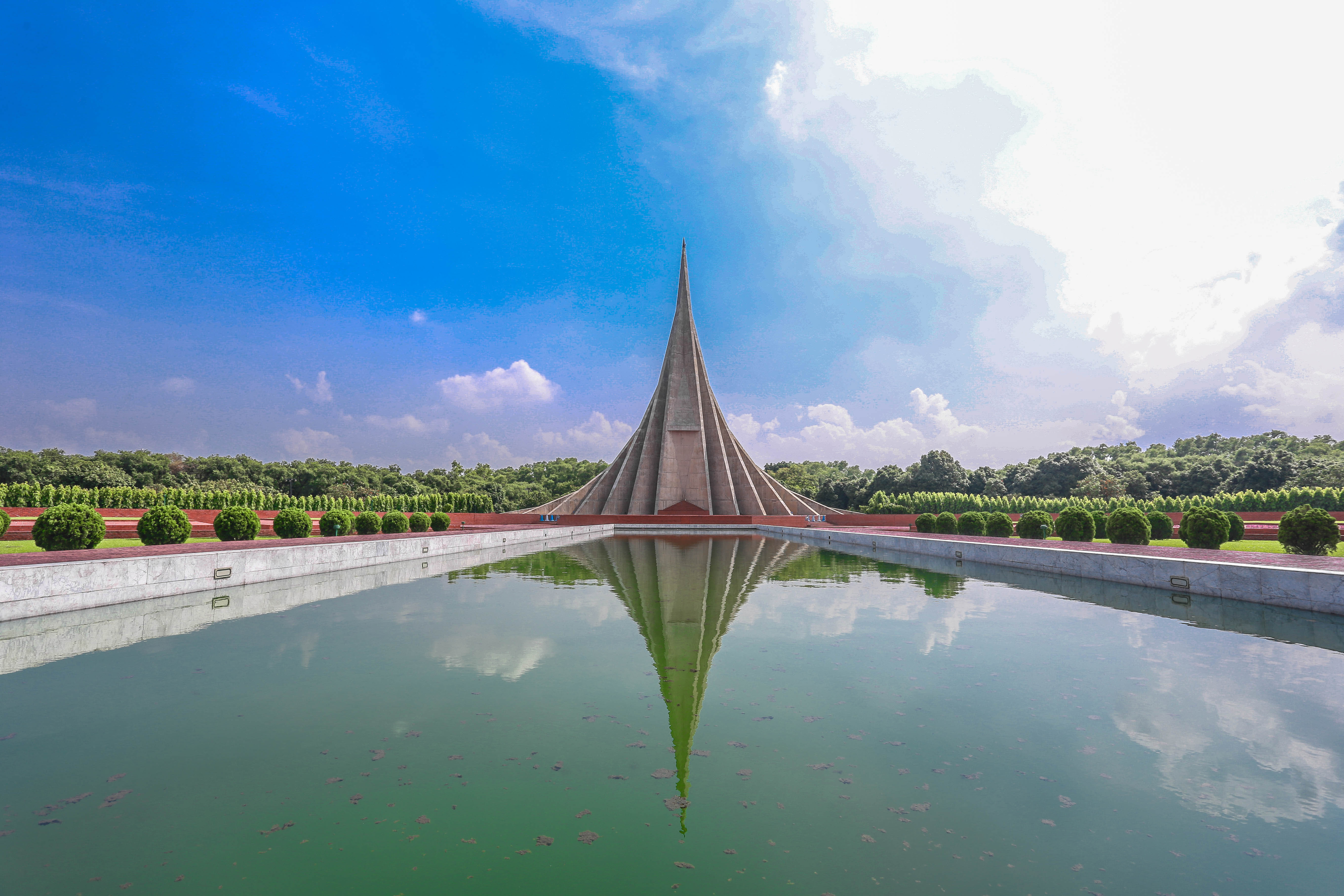
National Martyrs' Memorial in Savar, Dhaka

The National Martyrs' Memorial (জাতীয় স্মৃতিসৌধ Jatiyô Smrriti Soudhô) is a national monument in Bangladesh. It is dedicated to the memory of the valour and the sacrifice of all those who lost their lives in the 1971 Bangladesh Liberation War, which resulted in the country gaining independence from Pakistan. The monument is located in Savar, about 35 km northwest of the capital, Dhaka. It was designed by Syed Mainul Hossain.

The monument is composed of 7 isosceles triangular pyramid-shaped structures, with the middle one being the tallest. The highest point of the monument is 150 feet. There is an artificial lake, a reflecting pool, a pair of twin bridges, a picturesque garden and several mass graves in front of the main monument.

=== Martyred Intellectuals Memorial ===
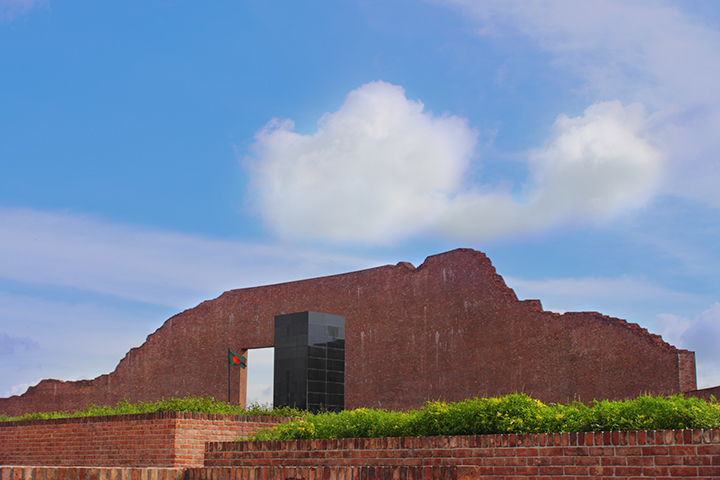
Martyred Intellectuals Memorial at Rayer Bazaar, Dhaka

The Martyred Intellectuals Memorial (বুদ্ধিজীবী স্মৃতিসৌধ) is a memorial built in memory of the martyred intellectuals of the Bangladesh Liberation War. The memorial, located in Rayer Bazaar, Mohammadpur Thana in Dhaka, was designed by architects Farid U Ahmed and Jami Al Shafi.

Throughout the Bangladesh Liberation War in 1971, a large number of teachers, doctors, engineers, poets and writers were systematically massacred by the Pakistan Army and their local collaborators, most notably the alleged militia groups Al-Badr and Al-Shams. The largest number of assassinations took place on 14 December 1971, only two days before the surrender of the Pakistan Army to the joint forces of both the Indian Army and the Mukti Bahini. The initial proposal for a memorial at Rayer Bazaar was brought forward by Projonmo '71 (an organisation of children of martyrs of the Liberation War), which also laid a temporary foundation stone in 1991.

=== Independence Monument ===
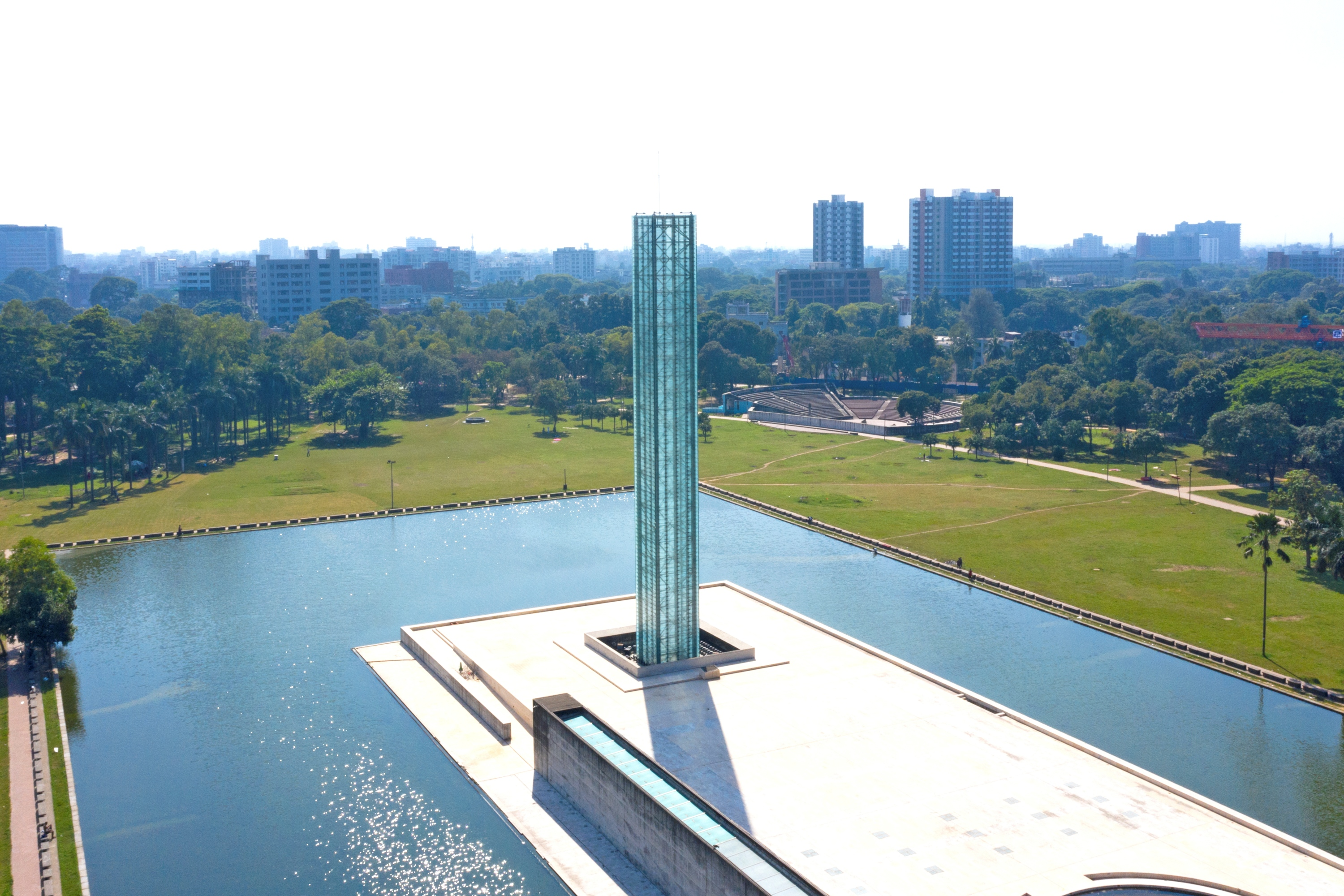
Swadhinata Stambha at Suhrawardy Udyan, Dhaka

Swadhinata Stambha (Bengali: স্বাধীনতা স্তম্ভ), or Independence Monument, is a national monument in Dhaka, Bangladesh, to commemorate the historical events that took place in the Suhrawardy Udyan, previously known as the Ramna Race Course, in relation to the Bangladesh Liberation War. The Government of Bangladesh took the initiative to build the monument in 1996. Construction began in 1999. Kashef Mahboob Chowdhury and Marina Tabassum designed the project.

Many significant incidents took place in the area now occupied by this monument. On 7 March 1971, Bangabandhu Sheikh Mujibur Rahman delivered his historical speech in the area after Yahya Khan postponed the national assembly on 1 March of that year. In his speech, he asked the people of Bangladesh to prepare themselves for the Liberation War. The main attraction of the monument is a 50-meter-high tower, composed of stacked glass panels, that stands at the place where the Pakistani Instrument of Surrender was signed at the end of the Liberation War.

== Other national and official symbols ==
Title	Image	Symbol and notes
Official name		গণপ্রজাতন্ত্রী বাংলাদেশ Gônôprôjatôntri Bangladesh; People's Republic of Bangladesh
State religion		Islam (91.04% of the population); Constitutionally equal status and rights are granted to Hinduism, Buddhism, Christianity and other minority religions
National poet		কাজী নজরুল ইসলাম; Kazi Nazrul Islam
National language		বাংলা Bangla (Bengali)
National calendar		বঙ্গাব্দ; Bangladeshi calendar
National sport		হা-ডু-ডু Ha-du-du (Kabaddi)
National park		ভাওয়াল জাতীয় উদ্যান; Bhawal National Park
National mosque		বায়তুল মুকাররম; Baitul Mukarram
National temple		ঢাকেশ্বরী মন্দির; Dhakeshwari Temple
National mountain		কিওক্রাডাং Keokradong
National river		যমুনা নদী Jamuna River
National museum		বাংলাদেশ জাতীয় যাদুঘর; Bangladesh National Museum
National library		বাংলাদেশ জাতীয় গ্রন্থাগার; National Library of Bangladesh
National dish		মাছ ও ভাত; Rice and fish
National currency		টাকা Taka
National colours		স্বর্ণ সবুজ লাল; Red Green Gold
National Cockade		বাংলাদেশের ককেড; Cockade of Bangladesh
National clothing		Panjabi and Lungi (male); Sari (female)
National airline		বিমান বাংলাদেশ এয়ারলাইন্স; Biman Bangladesh Airlines
National day		স্বাধীনতা ও জাতীয় দিবস; Independence and National Day (26 March)
National instrument		দোতারা Dotara

== Former official symbols ==
Title	Image	Symbol and notes	Years official
National slogan		জয় বাংলা Joy Bangla (Hail Bengal)	2022–2024
