= Amar Sonar Bangla =

National anthem of Bangladesh

Āmār Sōnār Bāṅlā
English: My Golden Bengal
- আমার সোনার বাংলা
- National anthem of Bangladesh
- Lyrics: Rabindranath Tagore, 1905 (disputed)
- Music: Rabindranath Tagore (adapted from a melody by Gagan Harkara)
- Adopted: 10 April 1971 (provisional); 16 December 1972 (official)
- Preceded by: Qaumi Taranah (as the anthem of Pakistan); Torana-i-Pakistan (as the anthem of East Pakistan)

Audio sample
- U.S. Navy Band instrumental version: file; help

"Amar Sonar Bangla" (Bengali: আমার সোনার বাংলা, lit. 'My Golden Bengal', pronounced [ˈamaɾ ˈʃonaɾ ˈbaŋla]) is the national anthem of the People's Republic of Bangladesh.

An ode to Mother Bengal, the lyrics were written by Bengali polymath Rabindranath Tagore. Although some unreliable sources claim that the song was written in 1905 in the context of the First Partition of Bengal, the absence of the song's original manuscript prevents this claim from being verified with complete certainty. It was adopted as the national anthem by the Provisional Government of Bangladesh in 1971.

== Etymology ==
Bangla is the endonymous Bengali form of the Anglicized exonym "Bengal". The word amar refers to the possessive first-person singular 'my' or '(of) mine'; the word sonar is the adjectival form of the root word sona, meaning 'gold'; and the word sonar, which literally translates as 'golden' or 'made of gold', is used as a term of endearment meaning 'beloved', but in the song, the words Sonar Bangla may be interpreted to express the preciousness of Bengal.

== History ==
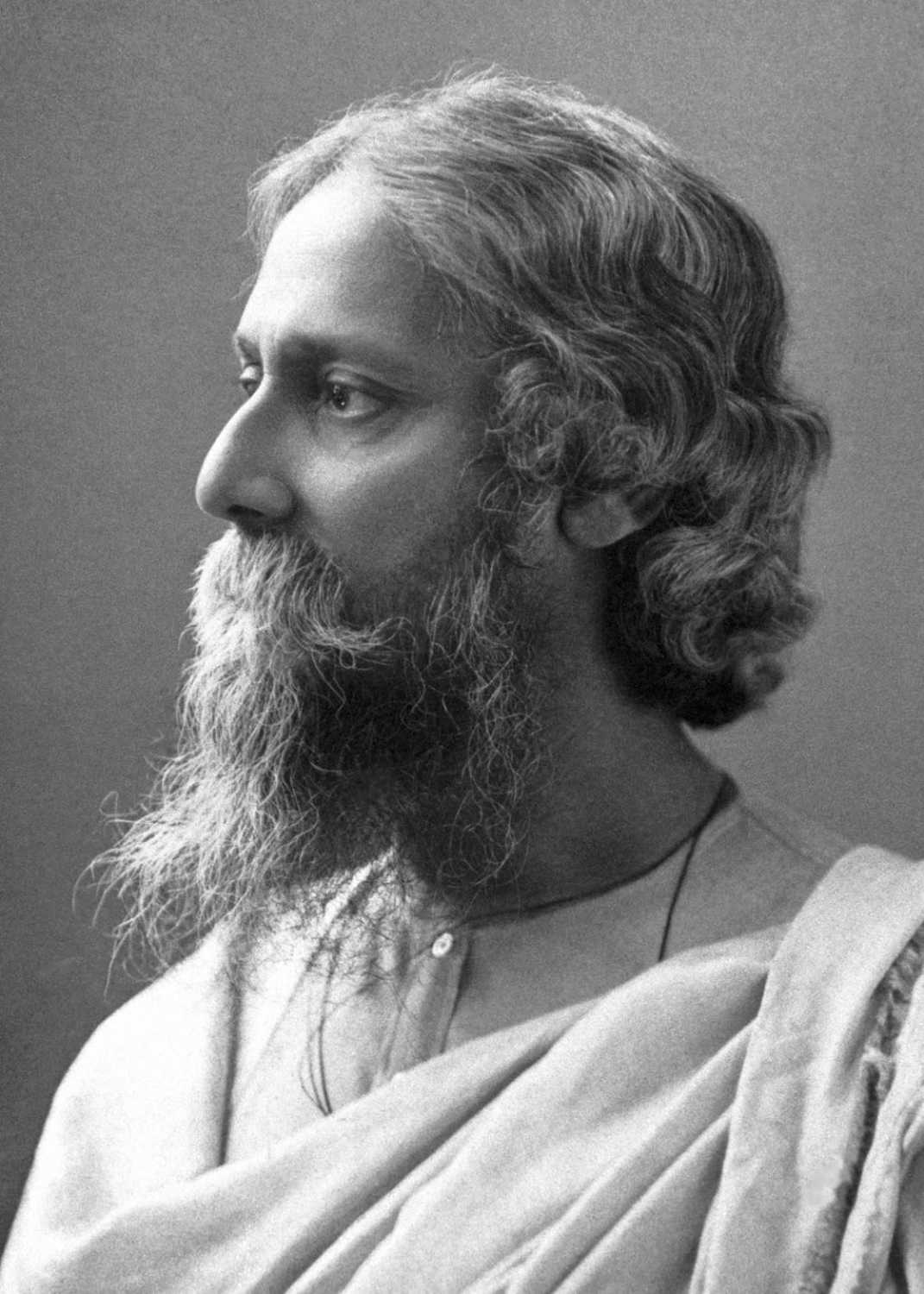
Rabindranath Tagore, writer of the song in 1905

The exact year of the song’s composition is not known. The melody is derived from Baul singer Gagan Harkara's "Ami Kothay Pabo Tare", set to Dadra tala. The partition of Bengal occurred in 1905 when the ruling British Empire had an undivided province of Bengal Presidency split into two parts; the decision was announced on 20 July by the then-Viceroy of India, Lord Curzon, taking effect on 16 October. This divide of Bengal, being along communal lines–East Bengal and Assam having a majority of Muslims and West Bengal having a majority of Hindus–is claimed to have been politically motivated. Along with a host of others, songs such as this were meant to rekindle the unified spirit of Bengal and to raise public consciousness against the communal political divide.

The actual date of the song's composition is disputed, because the original manuscript of the song was never found. Prashanta Kumar Paul, in his biography on Rabindranath Tagore Rabi Jibani, claimed that the song was first sung on 25 August 1905 in an essay conference at Kolkata. The lyrics first appeared in public in the September issues of Bongodorshon and Baul simultaneously in 1905. The song, along with the musical notation (referred to as swaralipi in Bengali), first appeared in the periodical musical journal Shongeet Biggnan Praveshika in the same month and year. Indira Devi, Tagore's niece, Satyendranath Tagore's daughter, jotted down the musical notation, hearing it from Tagore himself (this was the common norm, Tagore singing the song, and someone formally jotting down the musical notations).

=== Official adoption ===
The first ten lines of the original poem constitute the most commonly sung version of Bangladesh's national anthem, adopted in 1971 during the Bangladesh Liberation War. The instrumental orchestra rendition was composed by Samar Das. During the drafting of the Constitution of Bangladesh in 1972, two songs were proposed for the national anthem of the country, the "Amar Sonar Bangla" and "Dhana Dhanya Pushpa Bhara" by Dwijendra Lal Roy. At the end, Amar Sonar Bangla was selected.

== Lyrics ==
"Amar Shonar Bangla" sung version

The following provides the lyrics of Amar Sonar Bangla as written by Rabindranath Tagore. Only the first ten bolded lines of the original lyrics are sung as Bangladesh's national anthem.

Bengali original

**আমার সোনার বাংলা, আমি তোমায় ভালোবাসি।**
**চিরদিন তোমার আকাশ, তোমার বাতাস, আমার প্রাণে বাজায় বাঁশি॥**
**ও মা, ফাগুনে তোর আমের বনে ঘ্রাণে পাগল করে,**
**মরি হায়, হায় রে—**
**ও মা, অঘ্রাণে তোর ভরা ক্ষেতে আমি কী দেখেছি মধুর হাসি॥**

**কী শোভা, কী ছায়া গো, কী স্নেহ, কী মায়া গো—**
**কী আঁচল বিছায়েছ বটের মূলে, নদীর কূলে কূলে।**
**মা, তোর মুখের বাণী আমার কানে লাগে সুধার মতো,**
**মরি হায়, হায় রে—**
**মা, তোর বদনখানি মলিন হলে, ও মা, আমি নয়নজলে ভাসি॥**

তোমার এই খেলাঘরে শিশুকাল কাটিলে রে,
তোমারি ধুলামাটি অঙ্গে মাখি ধন্য জীবন মানি।
তুই দিন ফুরালে সন্ধ্যাকালে কী দীপ জ্বালিস ঘরে,
মরি হায়, হায় রে—
তখন খেলাধুলা সকল ফেলে, ও মা, তোমার কোলে ছুটে আসি॥

ধেনু-চরা তোমার মাঠে, পারে যাবার খেয়াঘাটে,
সারা দিন পাখি-ডাকা ছায়ায়-ঢাকা তোমার পল্লীবাটে,
তোমার ধানে-ভরা আঙিনাতে জীবনের দিন কাটে,
মরি হায়, হায় রে—
ও মা, আমার যে ভাই তারা সবাই, ও মা, তোমার রাখাল তোমার চাষি॥

ও মা, তোর চরণেতে দিলেম এই মাথা পেতে—
দে গো তোর পায়ের ধুলা, সে যে আমার মাথার মানিক হবে।
ও মা, গরিবের ধন যা আছে তাই দিব চরণতলে,
মরি হায়, হায় রে—
আমি পরের ঘরে কিনব না আর, মা, তোর ভূষণ ব'লে গলার ফাঁসি

Romanisation (ISO 15919)

**Āmār sōnār Bāṅlā, āmi tōmāẏ bhālōbāsi.**
**Ciradin tōmār ākāś, tōmār bātās, āmār prāṇē bājāẏ bā̃śi.**
**Ō mā, phāgunē tōr āmēr banē ghrāṇē pāgal karē,**
**Mari hāẏ, hāẏ rē–**
**Ō mā, Aghrāṇē tōr bharā kṣētē āmi kī dēkhēchi madhur hāsi.**

**Kī śōbhā, kī chāẏā gō, kī snēhô, kī māẏā gō,**
**Kī ā̃cal bichāẏēcha bôṭēr mūlē, nadīr kūlē kūlē.**
**Mā, tōr mukhēr bāṇī āmār kānē lāgē sudhār matō,**
**Mari hāẏ, hāẏ rē–**
**Mā, tōr badankhāni malin halē, ō mā, āmi naẏanjalē bhāsi.**

Tōmār ēi khēlāgharē śiśukāl kāṭilē rē,
Tōmāri dhulāmāṭi aṅgē mākhi dhanya jīban māni.
Tui din phurālē sandhyākālē kī dīp jbālis gharē,
Mari hāẏ, hāẏ rē–
Takhan khēlādhulā sakal phēlē, ō mā, tōmār kōlē chuṭē āsi.

Dhēnu-carā tōmār māṭhē, pārē jābār khēẏāghāṭē,
Sārā din pākhi-ḍākā chāẏāẏ-ḍhākā tōmār pallībāṭē,
Tōmār dhānē-bharā āṅinātē jībanēr din kāṭē
Mari hāẏ, hāẏ rē–
Ō mā, āmār jē bhāi tārā sabāi, ō mā, tōmār rākhāl tōmār cāṣi.

Ō mā, tōr caraṇētē dilēm ēi māthā pētē–
Dē gō tōr pāẏēr dhulā, sē jē āmār māthār mānik habē.
Ō mā, garibēr dhan ja āchē tāi diba caraṇtalē,
Mari hāẏ, hāẏ rē–
Āmi parēr gharē kinba nā ār, mā, tōr bhūṣaṇ ba'lē galār phā̃si.

IPA transcription (Note: See Help:IPA/Bengali and Bengali phonology.)

[ˈa.maɾ ˈʃo.naɾ ˈbaŋ.laˑ ǀ ˈa.miˑ ˈt̪o.mae̯ ˈbʱa.loˌba.ʃiˑ]
[ˈt͡ʃi.ɾo.d̪in ˈt̪o.maɾ ˈa.kaʃ ǀ ˈt̪o.maɾ ˈba.t̪aʃ ǀ ˈa.maɾ ˈpɾa.neˑ ˈba.d͡ʒae̯ ˈbã.ʃiˑ ‖]
[oˑ maˑ ǀ ˈpʰa.gu.neˑ t̪oɾ ˈa.meɾ ˈbo.neˑ ˈgʱɾa.neˑ ˈpa.gol ˈkɔ.ɾeˑ ǀ]
[ˈmo.ɾiˑ ɦae̯ ǀ ɦae̯ ɾeˑ ǀ]
[oˑ maˑ ǀ ˈɔ.gʱɾa.neˑ t̪oɾ ˈbʱɔ.ɾaˑ ˈkʰe.t̪eˑ ˈa.miˑ kiˑ ˈd̪e.kʰe.t͡ʃʰiˑ ˈmo.d̪ʱuɾ ˈɦa.ʃiˑ ‖]

[kiˑ ˈʃo.bʱaˑ ǀ kiˑ ˈt͡ʃʰae̯.aˑ goˑ ǀ kiˑ ˈsne.ɦoˑ ǀ kiˑ ˈmae̯.aˑ goˑ ǀ]
[kiˑ ˈã.t͡ʃol ˈbi.t͡ʃʰae̯ˌe.t͡ʃʰoˑ ˈbɔ.ʈeɾ ˈmu.leˑ ǀ ˈno.d̪iɾ ˈku.leˑ ˈku.leˑ]
[maˑ ǀ t̪oɾ ˈmu.kʰeɾ ˈba.niˑ ˈa.maɾ ˈka.neˑ ˈla.geˑ ˈʃu.d̪ʱaɾ ˈmɔ.t̪oˑ ǀ]
[ˈmo.ɾiˑ ɦae̯ ǀ ɦae̯ ɾeˑ ǀ]
[maˑ ǀ t̪oɾ ˈbɔ.d̪onˌkʰa.niˑ ˈmo.lin ˈɦo.leˑ ǀ oˑ maˑ ǀ ˈa.miˑ ˈnɔe̯.onˌd͡ʒɔ.leˑ ˈbʱa.ʃiˑ ‖]

[ˈt̪o.maɾ ei̯ ˈkʰɛ.laˌgʱɔ.ɾeˑ ˈʃi.ʃu.kal ˈka.ʈi.leˑ ɾeˑ ǀ]
[ˈt̪o.ma.ɾiˑ ˈd̪ʱu.laˌma.ʈiˑ ˈɔŋ.geˑ ˈma.kʰiˑ ˈd̪ʱo.nːoˑ ˈd͡ʒi.bɔn ˈma.niˑ]
[t̪ui̯ d̪in ˈpʰu.ɾa.leˑ ˈʃon̪.d̪ʱaˌka.leˑ kiˑ d̪ip ˈd͡ʒa.liʃ ˈgʱɔ.ɾeˑ ǀ]
[ˈmo.ɾiˑ ɦae̯ ǀ ɦae̯ ɾeˑ ǀ]
[ˈt̪ɔ.kʰon ˈkʰɛ.laˌd̪ʱu.laˑ ˈʃɔ.kol ˈpʰe.leˑ ǀ oˑ maˑ ǀ ˈt̪o.maɾ ˈko.leˑ ˈt͡ʃʰu.ʈeˑ ˈa.ʃiˑ ‖]

[ˈd̪ʱe.nuˌt͡ʃɔ.ɾaˑ ˈt̪o.maɾ ˈma.ʈʰeˑ ǀ ˈpa.ɾeˑ ˈd͡ʒa.baɾ ˈkʰe.e̯aˌgʱa.ʈeˑ ǀ]
[ˈʃa.ɾaˑ d̪in ˈpa.kʰiˌɖa.kaˑ ˈt͡ʃʰae̯.ae̯ˌɖʱa.kaˑ ˈt̪o.maɾ ˈpo.lːiˌbʱa.ʈeˑ ǀ]
[ˈt̪o.maɾ ˈd̪ʱa.neˌbʱɔ.ɾaˑ ˈaŋ.iˌna.t̪eˑ ˈd͡ʒi.bɔ.neɾ d̪in ˈka.ʈeˑ]
[ˈmo.ɾiˑ ɦae̯ ǀ ɦae̯ ɾeˑ ǀ]
[oˑ maˑ ǀ ˈa.maɾ d͡ʒeˑ bʱai̯ ˈt̪a.ɾaˑ ˈʃɔ.bai̯ ǀ oˑ maˑ ǀ ˈt̪o.maɾ ˈɾa.kʰal ˈt̪o.maɾ ˈt͡ʃa.ʃiˑ ‖]

[oˑ maˑ ǀ t̪oɾ ˈt͡ʃɔ.ɾoˌne.t̪eˑ ˈd̪i.lem ei̯ ˈma.t̪ʰaˑ ˈpe.t̪eˑ ǀ]
[d̪eˑ goˑ t̪oɾ ˈpae̯.eɾ ˈd̪ʱu.laˑ ǀ ʃeˑ d͡ʒeˑ ˈa.maɾ ˈma.t̪ʰaɾ ˈma.nik ˈhɔ.beˑ]
[oˑ maˑ ǀ ˈgo.ɾi.beɾ d̪ʱɔn d͡ʒaˑ ˈa.t͡ʃʰeˑ t̪ai̯ ˈd̪i.boˑ ˈt͡ʃɔ.ɾon̪ˌt̪ɔ.leˑ ǀ]
[ˈmo.ɾiˑ ɦae̯ ǀ ɦae̯ ɾeˑ ǀ]
[ˈa.miˑ ˈpɔ.ɾeɾ ˈgʱɔ.ɾeˑ ˈkin.boˑ naˑ aɾ ǀ maˑ ǀ t̪oɾ ˈbʱu.ʃon ˈbo.leˑ ˈgɔ.laɾ ˈpʰã.ʃiˑ ‖

=== English translation ===
The anthem was translated into English by Syed Ali Ahsan.

My golden Bengal, thee I love.
Forever thy skies be, thine air like a flute set my heart in tune;
O Mother, aroma of mango orchard in Falgun driveth me crazy,
Ah, such miraculousness!
O Mother, time seeth in Ogrohayon smiles sweet all through fields of paddy.

What beauty, what shades, what affection, what tenderness;
What a quilt thou hast spread at tip of banyans 'long ev'ry bank,
O Mother, words from thy lips like nectar to my ears.
Ah, such miraculousness!
If sadness, o mother, cast a gloom on thy face, my eyes filled with tears.

Spending my childhood in thy playhouse
Thy soil o'er my body smeared, I consider myself privileged.
Wonderful lamp at dusk thou lightest,
Ah, such miraculousness!
At once I quit playing and sprint back to thy lap, o mother.

In cattle grazing field, on pier for crossing stream,
Shaded village walkways, serene with calling birds
Open porch with heaped ripe paddy, my life goeth on.
Ah, such miraculousness!
All thy shepherds and farmers are my brothers.

This time I offer my head beneath thy feet,
Bless me with thy dust, obliged shall I be to flaunt overhead.
To thee I shall offer meagrely whatever I have at home,
Ah, such miraculousness!
Ne'er bothered to buy thee from others a hanging rope coronal guise.

== Criticism ==
According to Ziauddin Ahmed, the song as the national anthem has been facing criticism at least since 1975. Among the earliest open opponents to the song include Islamic Democratic League MP Abdur Rahim and Vice-chancellor of the University of Dhaka Prof. Aftab Ahmed.

=== Historical context ===
The song was composed during First Partition of Bengal, which many Bengali Muslims of Eastern Bengal (the territory of which mostly form the modern-day Bangladesh) had welcomed and endorsed. Supporters of the Partition oppose the song as the national anthem of Bangladesh, as the song itself was composed in a context of opposition to a separate East Bengal that would eventually become Bangladesh in future.

=== Islamist and anti-Hindutva opposition ===
The song often face Islamist opposition in the country. They claim that the word "mother" used in the song refers to Hindu goddess, and Rabindranath Tagore addressed the country a "motherly goddess". Many Qawmi Madrassa teachers consider singing the song as shirk and remain silent during anthem presentation.

British Bangladeshi anti-extremism advocate Mufassil Islam criticized the song as the national anthem from an anti-Hindutva perspective, calling Rabindranath Tagore a "Hindutwa fanatic".

=== Others ===
In her book Bengal Divided (1995), Indian author Jaya Chatterjee claimed that the song Amar Sonar Bangla doesn't have enough breath that is needed to develop national consciousness being a national anthem.

=== Major controversies ===
In 2018, the government made compulsory for all madrassas to sing national anthem. Three years later, the government instructed the vocational and the madrassa division to strictly implement the rule. These moves faced heavy criticism and protests from the madrassa teachers and students.

In 2018, Bangladeshi singer Mainul Ahsan Nobel, who was a runner-up in the Indian-Bengali musical show Sa Re Ga Ma Pa Bangla, said that Prince Mahmud's song "Bangladesh" depicted the beauty of Bangladesh far better than Amar Sonar Bangla. This remark sparked controversy among Bangladeshis. Later, he apologized for his remark.

In October 2020, a scholar from a local madrasa in Kushtia sang an Islamic song in the melody of Amar Sonar Bangla, which faced criticism.

In September 2024, Abdullahil Amaan Azmi, retired brigadier general of the Bangladesh Army and son of Bangladesh Jamaat-e-Islami Ameer Ghulam Azam, who held a press conference after his release from the Aynaghar, called for a replacement of Amar Sonar Bangla, claiming that the Indian government had forced the Provisional Government of Bangladesh to adopt the song. He also argued that Amar Sonar Bangla contradicted with the characteristics of Bangladesh, as the song was composed in the context of the partition of Bengal to unite the two Bengals. This remark sparked controversy on historical context and the significance of the anthem across the country. Liberal Democratic Party leader Col. (retd.) Oli Ahmed endorsed Azmi's remarks, citing three reasons–the song isn't about Bangladesh, the song wasn't written by a Bangladeshi citizen, and melody of the song was copied.

In early 2025, during the interim government led by Muhammad Yunus, Bangladeshi Islamic scholar Shaykh Ahmadullah and a few others, heavily criticized and advocated for banning the national anthem of Bangladesh. He said that the national anthem does not have the name of Bangladesh, that the music does not know about Bangladesh, that the music that was created before the birth of Bangladesh should be banned.

In October 2025, the Bharatiya Janata Party (BJP) Assam unit criticized the Indian National Congress politician Bidhu Bhushan Das for singing Amar Sonar Bangla in a political conference in Karimganj, India. Although Das himself claimed that he had only sung the song as a Rabindra Sangeet, the BJP slammed him for carrying a "vote-bank-agenda" by promoting "Greater Bangladesh". Even the Chief Minister of Assam Himanta Biswa Sarma ordered action against Das. This resulted in protest in Bangladesh against anti-Bengali sentiment in India.

=== Alternative proposals ===
==== Dhana Dhanya Pushpa Bhara ====
Dwijendra Lal Roy's patriotic song "Dhana Dhanya Pushpa Bhara", which was also composed during First Partition of Bengal, was one of the two proposals for national anthem following the Independence of Bangladesh, but eventually dropped in favour of Amar Sonar Bangla.

==== Notuner Gaan ====
Kazi Nazrul Islam's song "Notuner Gaan" is the national march of Bangladesh. In 1975, after the 15 August coup, then President Khondaker Mostaq Ahmed set up a committee for the replacement of the anthem. The song was one of two songs that were recommended by the committee. However, the process was halted after his removal.

==== Panjeri ====
Farrukh Ahmed's "Panjeri" was the other song that was proposed for the national anthem under Mostaq Ahmed.

==== Prothom Bangladesh ====
In 1979, in a letter sent to the Cabinet Division, then Prime Minister Shah Azizur Rahman argued that Amar Sonar Bangla was "contradictory to the national identity and the culture of Bangladeshis" as it was written by a person who had a non-Bangladeshi background, and proposed Shahnaz Rahmatullah's patriotic song "Prothom Bangladesh" for the national anthem. During the presidency of Ziaur Rahman, the song was played after Amar Sonar Bangla on the national television and the government programmes. However, the initiative stopped after the death of Rahman in 1981. Today, Prothom Bangladesh is the party anthem of the Bangladesh Nationalist Party (BNP).

==== Lyrical amendment ====
In 2002, Jamaat-e-Islami Ameer and government minister Motiur Rahman Nizami proposed an amendment to the lyrics of Amar Sonar Bangla, citing Islamic values and spirit. However, the Cabinet Division did not accept the proposal.

== Notable performances and covers ==
A former world record of more than a hundred thousand people performing Bangladesh's national anthem.

The Ministry of Cultural Affairs planned to stage an event on Bangladesh's 44th independence day in a bid to have the world record for the most people singing a national anthem simultaneously. Consequently, on 2 March, the ministry launched a program titled Lakho Konthe Sonar Bangla (lit. 'Amar Sonar Bangla in lakh voices') whose main objective was to hold an event with the cooperation of the Bangladesh Armed Forces where approximately 300,000 people would sing the national anthem. Several popular Bangladeshi musicians and cultural groups later joined the program.

The record was broken at 11:20 on 26 March 2014 by 254,537 participants at Dhaka's National Parade Ground. The event was attended by the Prime Minister of Bangladesh, Speaker of the Jatiya Sangsad, and all the members of the cabinet. After receiving the required evidence, the Guinness Book of World Records approved the record on 9 April 2014. The record was broken by India on 21 January 2017.

== See also ==
- Music of Bangladesh
- Music of Bengal
- "Jana Gana Mana", national anthem of India, also written by Rabindranath Tagore
- "Banglar Mati Banglar Jol", the state anthem of the Indian state of West Bengal, also written by Rabindranath Tagore
- "Sri Lanka Matha", national anthem of Sri Lanka, claimed to have been written by Rabindranath Tagore
- "Torana-i-Pakistan", anthem of East Pakistan, written by Golam Mostofa
- Bengali nationalism
