= Dhana Dhanya Pushpa Bhara =

1905 Bengali patriotic song by Dwijendra Lal Roy

Song
- Released: 1907
- Recorded: 1905
- Genre: Patriotic
- Songwriter: Dwijendra Lal Roy

"Dhana Dhanya Pushpa Bhara" (Bengali: ধনধান্য পুষ্প ভরা, lit. 'Lavished with a wealth of grains and flowers') is a Bengali language patriotic song composed by the Bengali litterateur Dwijendra Lal Roy in 1905. The song was composed in the context of the First Partition of Bengal. It was one of two songs, alongside “Amar Sonar Bangla,” proposed as Bangladesh's national anthem in 1972.

It is one of the most popular Bengali patriotic songs, in the region of Bengal.

== Background ==
The first partition of Bengal came to effect on 20 July 1905, where the British colonial government split the unified province of Bengal Presidency into two parts along communal lines–East Bengal and Assam having a majority of Muslims and West Bengal having a majority of Hindus. The event triggered a nationalist surge particularly among the Bengali Hindus, who claimed this move as politically motivated. Along with a host of others, songs such as this were meant to rekindle the unified spirit of Bengal and to raise public consciousness against the communal political divide. Dwijendra Lal Roy wrote the song in Bengali language during this time in 1905. The song was later included on his play Shajahan in 1907. A transcription of the song in Sanskrit was made by his son Dilip Kumar Roy much later.

== Popularity ==
The song was one of the various songs that were used to encourage the Bangladeshi freedom fighters during the Liberation War of Bangladesh. During the drafting of the Constitution of Bangladesh in 1972, two songs were proposed for the national anthem of the country, the "Amar Sonar Bangla" by Rabindranath Tagore and "Dhana Dhanya Pushpa Bhara". But at the end, Amar Sonar Bangla was selected.

The song ranked 10th in the list of the twenty greatest Bengali songs of all time in a 2006 survey conducted by BBC Bangla. The song became popular during the July Revolution of Bangladesh when thousands of protesters chorused the song on 3 August 2024.

== Lyrics ==
Bengali original

ধনধান্য পুষ্পভরা আমাদের এই বসুন্ধরা (Note: Also sung: ধনধান্যে পুষ্পে ভরা)
তাহার মাঝে আছে দেশ এক–সকল দেশের সেরা;–
ও সে, স্বপ্ন দিয়ে তৈরি সে-দেশ, স্মৃতি দিয়ে ঘেরা;
এমন দেশটি কোথাও খুঁজে পাবে নাকো তুমি,
সকল দেশের রানি সে যে–আমার জন্মভূমি।

চন্দ্র সূর্য গ্রহ তারা, কোথায় উজল এমন ধারা।
কোথায় এমন খেলে তড়িৎ এমন কালো মেঘে!
তার পাখির ডাকে ঘুমিয়ে উঠি, পাখির ডাকে জেগে; (Note: Also sung: তারা পাখির ডাকে ঘুমিয়ে পড়ে, পাখির ডাকে জেগে, or তারা পাখির ডাকে ঘুমিয়ে ওঠে, পাখির ডাকে জেগে)
এমন দেশটি কোথাও খুঁজে পাবে নাকো তুমি,
সকল দেশের রানি সে যে–আমার জন্মভূমি।

এত স্নিগ্ধ নদী কাহার, কোথায় এমন ধূম্র পাহাড়!
কোথায় এমন হরিৎক্ষেত্র আকাশতলে মিশে!
এমন ধানের উপর ঢেউ খেলে যায় বাতাস কাহার দেশে!
এমন দেশটি কোথাও খুঁজে পাবে নাকো তুমি,
সকল দেশের রানি সে যে–আমার জন্মভূমি।

পুষ্পে পুষ্পে ভরা শাখী; কুঞ্জে কুঞ্জে গাহে পাখি;
গুঞ্জরিয়া আসে অলি পুঞ্জে পুঞ্জে ধেয়ে–
তারা, ফুলের উপর ঘুমিয়ে পড়ে ফুলের মধু খেয়ে;
এমন দেশটি কোথাও খুঁজে পাবে নাকো তুমি,
সকল দেশের রানি সে যে–আমার জন্মভূমি।

ভায়ের মায়ের এত স্নেহ কোথায় গেলে পাবে কেহ!–
ও মা তোমার চরণ দুটি বক্ষে আমার ধরি,
আমার এই দেশেতে জন্ম–যেন এই দেশেতে মরি–
এমন দেশটি কোথাও খুঁজে পাবে নাকো তুমি,
সকল দেশের রানি সে যে–আমার জন্মভূমি।

English translation

Lavished with a wealth of grains and flowers is our Mother Earth.
In the midst of this is a land, more splendid than all other lands.
She is created by dreams, she is surrounded by memories.
Nowhere will you discover such a land as this.
O she is the queen of all lands, she is my motherland.

Moon and sun, planets and stars. Is there a similar surge of brilliance anywhere?
Where does the lightning play quite like this, among such black clouds?
After the call of her birds put me to sleep, I am awakened by the birdsongs again.
Nowhere will you discover such a land as this.
O she is the queen of all lands, she is my motherland.

Whose rivers are so gentle? Do such massive mountains exist anywhere?
Where do such green acres meet like this, under the skies?
In whose land does the wind dance like waves on paddy?
Nowhere will you discover such a land as this.
O she is the queen of all lands, she is my motherland.

The trees are covered with flowers, birds sing in every haunt,
Buzzing, the bees arrive and chase each other in great clusters.
They fall asleep on the flowers after drinking their nectar.
Nowhere will you discover such a land as this.
O she is the queen of all lands, she is my motherland.

Where can one go to attain so much affection, from a mother or brother?
I hold both your feet, O Mother, close to my breast,
I was born in this very land, let me die here, as well.
Nowhere will you discover such a land as this.
O she is the queen of all lands, she is my motherland.

== See also ==
- "Amar Sonar Bangla", the national anthem of Bangladesh by Rabindranath Tagore, also written in the context of the First Partition of Bengal
- Dwijendrageeti
