= Banga Mata =

Personification of Bengal

Map of Bengal

Banga Mata (Bengali: বঙ্গমাতা [ˈbɔŋɡoˌmat̪aˑ]) or Bangla Ma (Bengali: বাংলা মা [ˈbaŋlaˑ ˈmaˑ]), often translated into English as Mother Bengal, is a personification of Bengal. It emerged during the Bengali Renaissance and was later adopted by the Bengali nationalists. Banga Mata is originally an old abstract personification of greater Bengal (modeled after similar ones from Europe, such as Britannia). It remains popular in Bangladeshi and Indian Bengali as a cultural expression and a patriotic symbol.

In Amar Sonar Bangla, the national anthem of Bangladesh, Rabindranath Tagore used the word "Maa" (Mother) numerous times to refer to the motherland, i.e., Bengal. Despite her popularity in patriotic songs and poems, her physical representations and images are rare.

== History ==
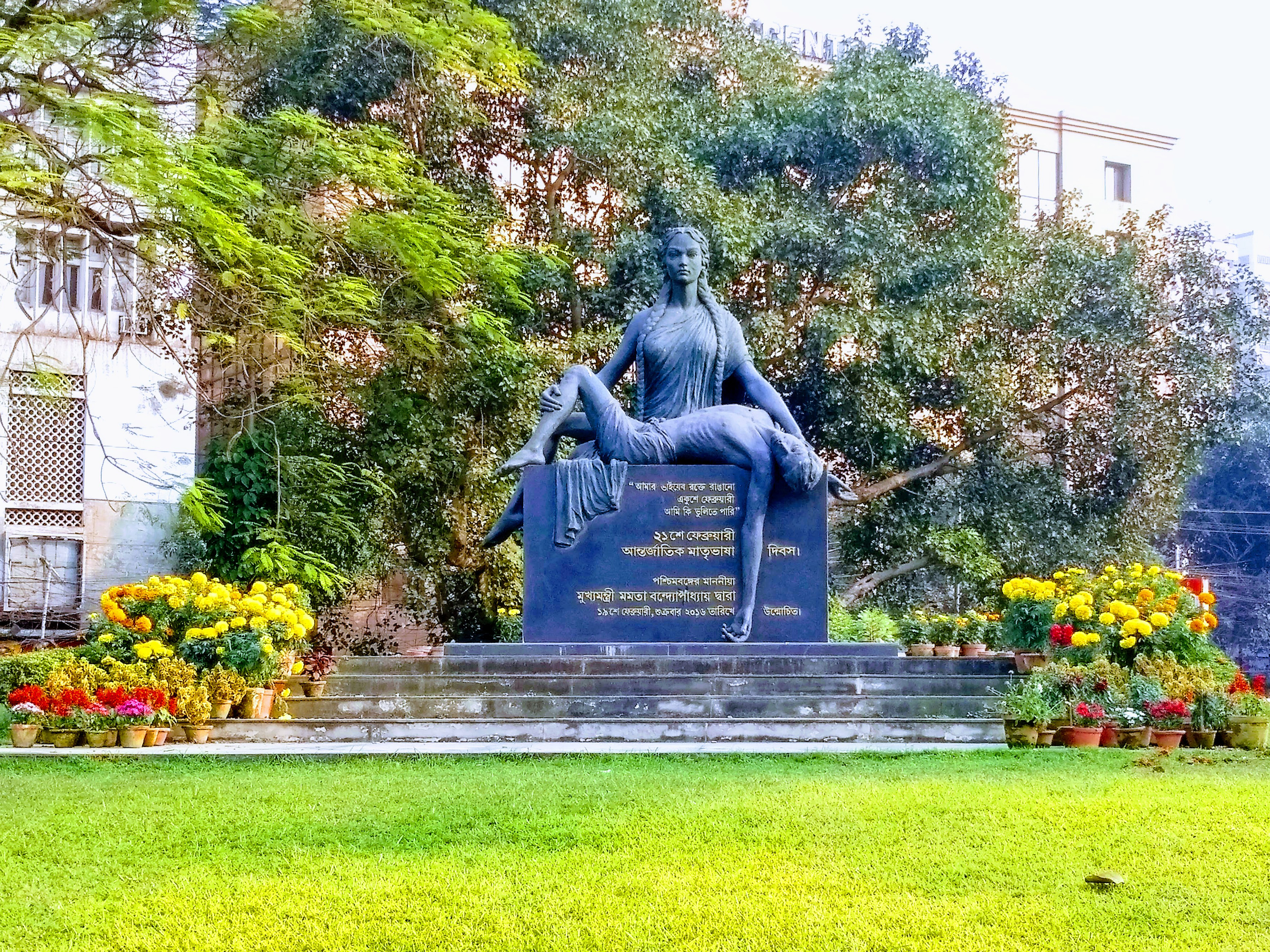
Mother Language Day Monument in Kolkata, West Bengal, depicting a mother with her fallen language martyr in the Bengali language movement

=== Swadeshi movement ===
The Swadeshi movement was a campaign that promoted self-sufficiency through the use of domestically produced goods while rejecting British products. It emerged as a major response to the partition of Bengal, which was announced by the colonial administration in December 1903 and formally implemented in 1905. The movement contributed significantly to the growth of Indian nationalism. During this period, Abanindranath Tagore created the painting originally titled Banga Mata, which was later renamed Bharat Mata on the suggestion of Sister Nivedita. The painting came to symbolize nationalist aspirations and became closely associated with the ideals of the Swadeshi movement.

=== First partition of Bengal ===
The first incarnations of Mother Bengal, or Bangamata, emerged during resistance to the partition of Bengal. The partition took place in October 1905 and separated the largely Muslim areas of Eastern Bengal from the largely Hindu areas of Western Bengal. Wealthy Hindus centered around Calcutta, who dominated Bengal's businesses and rural life, complained that the partition would make them a minority in a province due to the incorporation of the Bihar and Orissa Province into the Bengal Presidency. It was during this time the Mother Bengal was an immensely popular theme in Bengali patriotic songs and poems and was mentioned in several of them, such as the song ″Dhana Dhanya Pushpa Bhara″ and ″Banga Amar Janani Amar″ (Our Bengal Our Mother) by Dwijendralal Ray. These songs were meant to rekindle the unified spirit of Bengal, to raise public consciousness against political divides.

=== Bangladesh Liberation War ===
The theme of Mother Bengal continued through the Bengali nationalist movement in East Bengal into the struggle for the Independence of Bangladesh, from the events of 1948-1952 Bengali Language Movement to the 1971 Liberation War for Bangladesh, the concept of Mother Bengal was evoked and kept centered within the revolution. Many Bengali patriotic songs referring to Mother Bengal were composed within this time-frame and alongside already existing songs of such nature were regularly played on the Swadhin Bangla Betar Kendra, the clandestine radio station broadcast to revolutionaries and the Bengali public during the Bangladesh Liberation War. Some of these patriotic songs, such as "O Amar Bangladesher Mati" (written by Kazi Nazrul Islam), "O Amar Bangla Maa" (which was written by a Bangladeshi freedom fighter during the war), "Jonmo Amar Dhonno Holo Maa-go" and "Bangla Moder Bangla Maa Amra Tomar Koti Shontan" have significant representations of Mother Bengal. These patriotic songs are still immensely popular in modern-day Bangladesh.

== In art and literature ==
- Vande Mataram, by Bankim Chandra Chattopadhyay
- Banglar Mati Banglar Jol, by Rabindranath Tagore
- Banga Amar Janani Amar, by Dwijendralal Ray
- Bangamata (poem), by Rabindranath Tagore
- Amar Sonar Bangla, by Rabindranath Tagore in 1905
- O Amar Desher Mati, by Rabindranath Tagore
- Bangladesh, by Kazi Nazrul Islam
- Aaji Bangladesher Hridoy, by Rabindranath Tagore
- Bangla Mayer Kol, by S. D. Burman; better known by the first line Takdum Takdum Bajai Bangladesher Dhol
- O Amar Bangla Maa, written by 'Muktijoddha' Abul Umrah Fakhruddin, composed by Alauddin Ali

== See also ==
- National personification, contains the list of personifications for various nations and territories.
- Bharat Mata, the national personification of India as a mother goddess.
- Sri Lanka Matha, the national personification in the national anthem of Sri Lanka as a mother goddess.
- Ibu Pertiwi, the national personification of Indonesia.
- Vande Mataram, song sung in reverence of Bharat Mata and Banga Mata.
- Joy Bangla
- Columbia, an equivalent symbol for the United States.
- Telugu Thalli
- Janani Janmabhumishcha Swargadapi Gariyasi
