= Gagan Harkara (sculpture) =

Gagan Harkara The Postman of Kushtia
- Artist: Faisal Mahmud
- Completion date: May 26, 2016; 9 years ago
- Location: Housing D-Block (Nishan Mor), Kushtia
- 23.894369°N 89.136216°E

Gagan Harkara also known as The Postman of Kushtia is a sculpture that vividly portrays the lifestyle of traditional postmen. This sculpture is a tribute to Gagan Harkara, a historical figure from Kumarkhali in Kushtia District. The sculpture was commissioned by the Kushtia Municipality to commemorate the profession of the postman, a significant part of history, and to introduce the legacy of Gagan Harkara, a distinguished figure from the Kushtia District, to the younger generation.

The then Executive Engineer of Kushtia Municipality said:

"Postmen used to carry messages from one person to another, always on the move. The spear in their hands ensured their safety. We want to deliver good messages to the people of the municipality. That’s why the sculpture of a postman was created at the town’s Nishan Mor. While creating this, we also kept in mind the renowned figure Gagan Harkara."

— Robiul Islam,

== History ==
The former mayor of Kushtia Municipality, Anwar Ali, initiated the plan to construct this sculpture in 2014. On November 30, 2015, the proposal for the sculpture's construction was approved during the municipality's monthly meeting. Artist Faisal Mahmud began the construction work on March 23, 2016. The work was completed in just two months, on May 26. The total cost of constructing the sculpture amounted to 5 lakh taka.

== Design ==
In the sculpture, Gagan Harkara holds a lantern and a spear in his left hand. A small bell hangs below the tip of the spear. In his right hand, he carries a letter bag slung over his shoulder, attached to the end of a stick. He wears a turban on his head and a dhoti. Gagan Harkara is depicted running forward at full speed, holding a lantern to pierce through the darkness of the night.

Barefoot, holding a spear in one hand—with a small bell at its tip, and a lantern in the same hand to light the way in the darkness. Carrying a bag full of letters on his back, the post runner dashes ahead.

— Amanur Aman,

The column on which the sculpture stands is surrounded by four post boxes.
