= Mufassil Islam =

British-Bangladeshi lawyer, activist, critic (born 1966)

- মুফাস্সিল ইসলাম
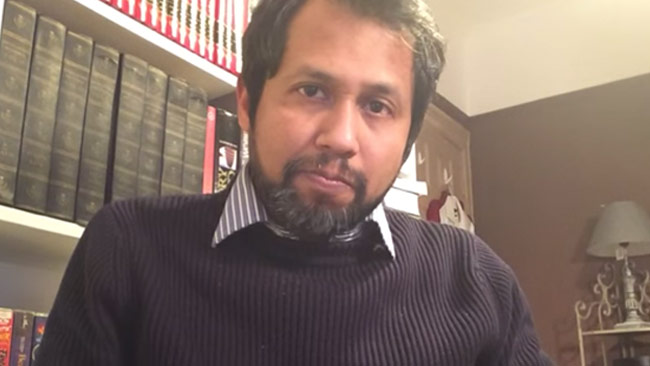
- Mufassil Islam in a campaign promoting his 2017 book The Codex of a Murtad in London, UK
- Born: Mufassil Mohammed Islam; 10 October 1966 (age 59); Dhaka, Bangladesh
- Citizenship: British
- Occupations: Academic, activist, political analyst, ex-lawyer
- Spouse: Ishrat Islam

Mufassil Muhammed Mazhaarul Islam is a former British–Bangladeshi lawyer, academic, journalist, activist, political commentator, and critic of religious extremism. He is an advocate of the Bangladesh Bar Council. He was the chairman of the For Britain political party in Northern Ireland.

== Early life and family ==
Mufassil Islam was born on 10 October 1966, in Dhaka, Bangladesh. He is the son of Muhammad Nazrul Islam, a lawyer and law professor at the Central Law College in Dhaka, and Niru Nahar. His grandfather Muhamad Sulaiman was a Sufi saint. His granduncle A. K. M. Nurul Islam was the Chief Justice of Bangladesh. Mufassil Islam hails from a distinguished family with notable contributions in law, medicine, and the arts. His maternal grandfather, K. M. Sadequr Rahman, was a prominent lawyer and the founder of the High Speed Group, the largest shipping conglomerate in what was then East Pakistan (now Bangladesh). On his paternal side, his uncle Dr. Mahbubul Islam was a pioneering bariatric surgeon based in Iowa, USA. His younger sister, Humairia Islam, is a recognized film director in North Carolina and is listed in Who’s Who in America. His elder sister, Dr. Shireen Islam, is a practicing physician also residing in North Carolina.

Mufassil’s maternal lineage traces back to the aristocratic zamindar (landowning) family of Araihajar in Narayanganj. His maternal great-grandfather, Advocate Mumtaj Uddin Ahmed, was among the founding members of the Dhaka Bar Association, contributing significantly to the early legal infrastructure of the region.

== Education ==
Islam received his LLB (Honors) and LL.M. from Dhaka University in 1991 and 1992, respectively, and later studied law at London Metropolitan University. He was pursuing his PhD in law at Trinity College Dublin when he was forced to suspend his studies due to threats from Islamists. He received his training in immigration laws from Central Law Training and BPP in London, UK. He received training in cyber law from the Berkman Center for Internet & Society at Harvard University in the United States. he holds PhD in Business Law from Swiss School of Business Resrarch

== Career ==
Islam moved from Bangladesh to the UK in 1993. He lived in the US from 1994 to 1995 and worked for migration law offices in Georgia and New York.

Throughout his career, Islam has worked as a lawyer dealing in refugee law in Bangladesh, the UK, and the US. He has also served as a journalist, contributing to several national and international newspapers and periodicals, including The Daily Star and The Bangladesh Observer. Islam has been critical of religious extremism.

Islam was the founding executive editor of the first law journal of Bangladesh, Aain Porikroma. He served as the elected representative at Dhaka University Law Faculty and the founder of the Dhaka University Moot Court Society. He was an intern at KRW Law in Belfast, Northern Ireland, and the chairman of the For Britain political party in Northern Ireland. He is an advocate of the Bangladesh Bar Council, and leads a pressure group aimed at stopping cross-border killings by Indian Border Security Forces along the Bangladesh-India border. He makes occasional TV appearances as a political and theologian commentator. He also makes vlogs on social media.

=== Controversies ===
Islam renounced his religion in 2016 and blamed Islamist extremism for his apostasy. He later considered himself an apatheist and became a vocal critic of all religions. He often used to engage in debates with theologian scholars, including David Wood and Michael Nugent. That same year, he posted a YouTube speech condemning the Paris atrocities, and criticizing and opposing the attempts to impose Sharia law and radical Islam in the West.

Since then, he has faced numerous death threats from radical Islamists, including from ISIS supporters. One of his books, The Codex of a Murtad, was published in January 2017 from the UK and was met with criticism from Muslims. The book details his journey from being a Muslim preacher to renouncing Islam in 2016 due to the threat of Islamist extremism, also the challenges and dangers he faced as he spoke out against radical Islam and attempted to reform the religion.

In 2018, Islam announced that he had rejoined the Islamic faith. His decision was met with mixed reactions: some praised him for finding his way back to religion, while others have questioned the sincerity of his conversion and accused him of pandering to the demands of his critics. He revealed that he does not follow the conventional version of Islam, but a soft reformed unorthodox version.

In 2019, Mufassil Islam was criticized for his controversial remarks on Rabindranath Tagore and the National Anthem of Bangladesh. According to him, Tagore was a 'Hindutwa fanatic' and thus "Tagore's song should not be the national anthem of Bangladesh".

In 2021, Islam filed a lawsuit against Facebook Ireland Ltd, alleging that the company's failure to remove threatening content and censorship of his account constituted breaches of data protection, privacy, and harassment. His case against Facebook was resolved under undisclosed terms. Islam has announced that he plans to pursue separate legal action against other social media and online organizations for similar abuse.

Reporting the incident for The Guardian Weekly, Dan Milmo wrote, "His [Mufassil Islam's] decision to pursue legal action against Facebook and other organizations shows a commitment to ensuring that individuals have the right to express themselves freely and safely online."

Islam has been prohibited from being employed by any law firms which the Solicitors Regulation Authority (SRA) regulates since 2008.Mufassil Islam not ever being a member of SRA in England, finds the prohibition irrelevant.

== Personal life ==
Islam has two children and he lives in Belfast

=== Views ===
Islam holds the view that wars should not be won through the use of force. Instead, he believes that patience, understanding, and diplomatic strategies are the keys to success in ideological struggles. He argues that the Soviet Union's victory over communism was achieved through ideological struggle and strategies, which he sees as an example of how history never forgives oppressors. He believes that Muslim immigrants who come to Britain from the Middle East should be grateful for the protection and shelter the country offers. He also condemns those who try to impose Islamic law and says that they do not have the right to kill.
