= Banglar Mati Banglar Jol =

Official anthem of West Bengal, India

Banglar Maṭi Banglar Jol
English: "Soil of Bengal, Water of Bengal"
- বাংলার মাটি বাংলার জল
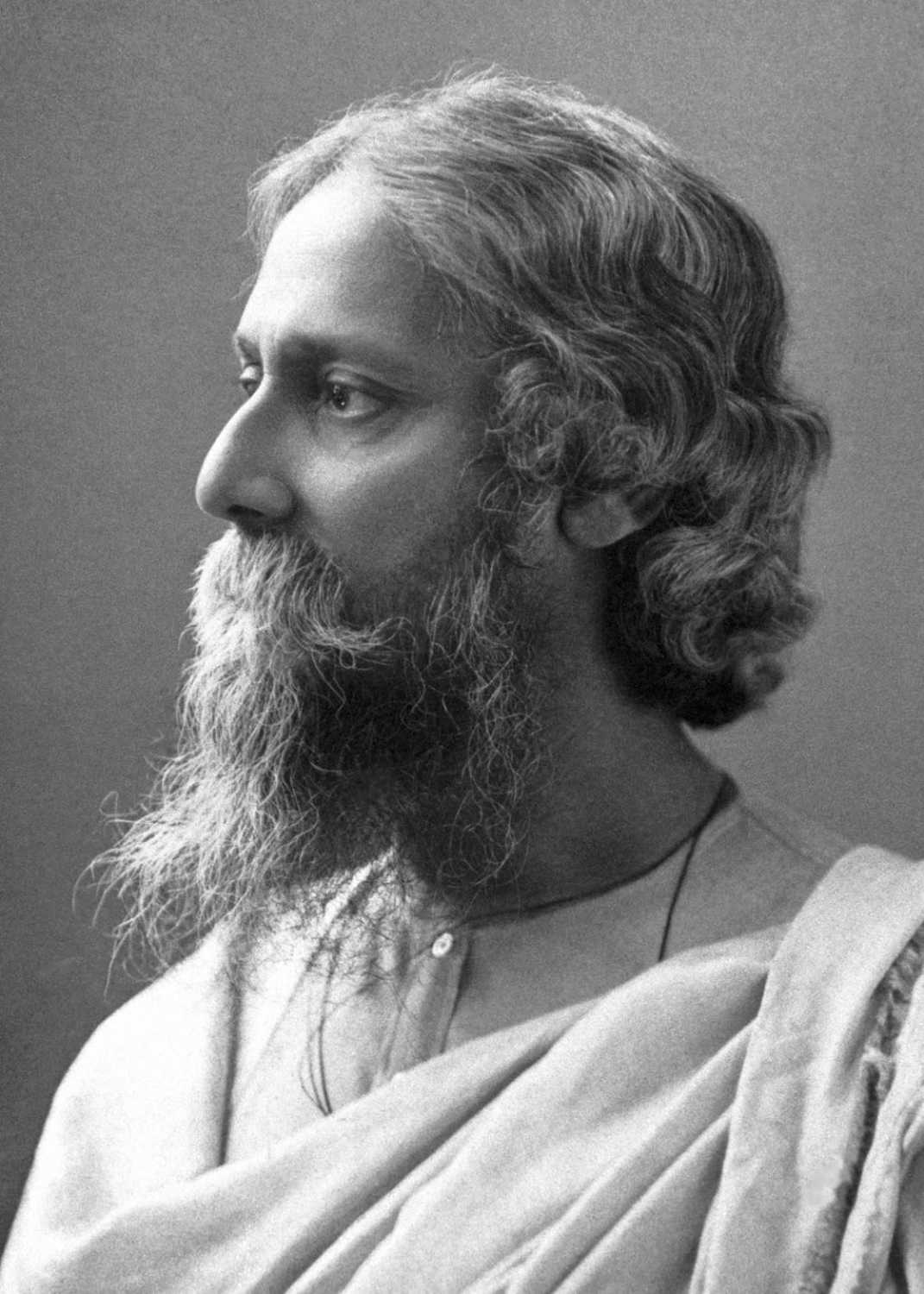
- Rabindranath Tagore, the author and composer of the national and state anthems of India, Bangladesh and West Bengal
- State anthem of West Bengal, India
- Lyrics: Rabindranath Tagore, 1905
- Music: Rabindranath Tagore, 1905
- Adopted: 7 September 2023
- Preceded by: Banga Mata

Audio sample
- Banglar Mati Banglar Jol: file; help

"Banglar Maṭi Banglar Jol" (Bengali: বাংলার মাটি বাংলার জল, pronounced [ˈbaŋlaɾ ˈmaʈi ˈbaŋlaɾ dʒɔl]; "Soil of Bengal, Water of Bengal") is a Bengali patriotic song written by Kobiguru Rabindranath Tagore and is the official state anthem of West Bengal.

== History ==
An ode to Bongo Mata (The Personification of Mother Bengal), it was composed in 1905 in support of the Bangabhanga Rodh Movement against the 1905 Partition of Bengal. Tagore started "Raksha Bandhan Utsav" on 16 October 1905 to reunite Hindu and Muslim Bengalis protesting the Partition of Bengal, and on that day, this song was the motto of the movement. The notation of the song was given by Indira Debi Chowdhurani.

== Official adoption ==
On 7 September 2023, the West Bengal Legislative Assembly passed a resolution making "Banglar Mati Banglar Jol" the official state song of West Bengal.

== Lyrics ==
Bengali original

বাংলার মাটি বাংলার জল
বাংলার বায়ু বাংলার ফল
পুণ্য হউক পুণ্য হউক
পুণ্য হউক হে ভগবান।

বাংলার ঘর বাংলার হাট
বাংলার বন বাংলার মাঠ
পূর্ণ হউক পূর্ণ হউক
পূর্ণ হউক হে ভগবান।

বাঙালির পণ বাঙালির আশা
বাঙালির কাজ বাঙালির ভাষা
সত্য হউক সত্য হউক
সত্য হউক হে ভগবান।

বাঙালির প্রাণ বাঙালির মন
বাঙালির ঘরে যত ভাই বোন
এক হউক এক হউক
এক হউক হে ভগবান।

Romanisation of Bengali

Banglar maṭi, banglar jol,
Banglar bayu, banglar phol.
Punyo houk, punyo houk,
Punyo houk, he bhagoban.

Banglar ghor, banglar hat,
Banglar bōn, banglar maṭh.
Purno houk, purno houk,
Purno houk, he bhagoban.

Bangalir pon, bangalir asha,
Bangalir kaj, bangalir bhasa.
Sotyo houk, sotyo houk,
Sotyo houk, he bhagoban.

Bangalir pran, bangalir mon,
Bangalir ghore, joto bhai bon.
Ek houk, ek houk,
Ek houk, he bhagoban.

English translation

Soil of Bengal, water of Bengal,
Air of Bengal, fruits of Bengal.
Let them be sacred, let them be sacred,
Let them be sacred, O Lord.

Homes of Bengal, markets of Bengal,
Forests of Bengal, fields of Bengal.
Let them be brimming, let them be brimming,
Let them be brimming, O Lord.

Bengali feats, Bengali hopes,
Bengali goals, Bengali tongue.
Let them be true, let them be true,
Let them be true, O Lord.

Bengali lives, Bengali minds,
In Bengali home as kins.
Let them be one, let them be one,
Let them be one, O Lord.

== See also ==
- "Amar Shonar Bangla"
- Bangamata
- "Jana Gana Mana"
