= Bangladeshi 2-taka note =

Bangladeshi banknote

Two Taka
- Country: Bangladesh
- Value: ৳2
- Width: 100 mm
- Height: 60 mm
- Security features: Watermark
- Years of printing: 1988 (1st version)

Obverse
- Design date: 2021

Reverse
- Design date: 2021

The Bangladeshi 2-taka note (৳2) is made up of 200 poisa as ৳2 = 200 poisa. Currently, it is one of the government-issued Bangladeshi banknotes in circulation. As a result, the two taka note is a note bearing the signature of the finance secretary and not the governor of the national bank of the country.

The government of Bangladesh issued this note for public use on 29 December 1988. The color of the note was salmon pink; currently it is tan and green. The front side of the note had a monument to the Bengali language movement, and on the back was a picture of a magpie bird. In 2015, it was decided to abolish the two taka note. These notes are smuggled to India and Bangladesh for the purpose of making counterfeit money, preserving them as antiques, and making drug pipes. On 15 July 2021, the note was issued under the new finance secretary. The present note has a picture of Bangabandhu.
