= Dwijendrageeti =

Sect of music

- Native name: দ্বিজেন্দ্রগীতি
- Etymology: Songs and music composed by Dwijendralal Ray
- Cultural origins: Late 19th century and early 20th century, Bengal

Regional scenes
- India and Bangladesh

Dwijendrageeti (Bengali: দ্বিজেন্দ্রগীতি) refers to the songs written and composed by Dwijendralal Ray. These songs hold a special place in the world of Bengali music. Dwijendralal Ray wrote and composed nearly 500 songs, which are widely popular in Bengal. Some of the most notable Dwijendrageeti include Dhono Dhanno Pushpe Bhora Amader Ei Boshundhora, Banga Amar! Janani Amar! Dhatri Amar! Amar Desh, Jedin Sunil Jaladhi Haite Uṭhile Janani Bharatabarṣa and Oi Mahasindhur Opar Hote, which are Patriotic songs.

== Background ==
Dwijendralal Ray's father was famous singer Kartikeya Chandra Ray. As a result, he grew up in a musical environment. When he got into ballet, he didn't like western music at first. He heard music at the famous Albert Hall in London. But he was disappointed when he heard the song. However, gradually he started to like western music. He learned Scottish, Irish and English songs from a music teacher. He liked those songs so much that when he came to the country, he translated about thirty songs into Bengali, and maintain their original tone. Finally, he returned to written and composed Bengali songs. However, the influence of foreign music can be seen in his songs.
