= Ami Kothay Pabo Tare =

Bengali-language song with lyrics by Gagan Harkara

Ami Kothay Pabo Tare (Bengali: আমি কোথায় পাবো তারে, "Where shall I meet him") is a Bangladeshi folk song whose lyrics and tune were written by Baul singer Gagan Harkara The melody of the hymn Amar Sonar Bangla, national anthem of Bangladesh, written by Rabindranath Tagore, is derived from this song.

== Lyrics ==
Bengali script

আমি কোথায় পাব তারে, আমার মনের মানুষ যে রে
হারায়ে সেই মানুষে, তার উদ্দেশে দেশ-বিদেশে
আমি দেশ-বিদেশে বেড়াই ঘুরে
কোথায় পাব তারে, আমার মনের মানুষ যে রে

লাগি সেই হৃদয় শশী, সদা প্রাণ হয় উদাসী
পেলে মন হোতো খুশি, দিবা-নিশি দেখিতাম নয়ন ভরে
আমি প্রেমানলে মরছি জ্বলে, নিভাই কেমন করে
(মরি হায়! হায় রে!)
ও তার বিচ্ছেদে প্রাণ কেমন করে
(ও রে) দেখনা তোরা হৃদয় চিরে
কোথায় পাব তারে, আমার মনের মানুষ যে রে

দিবো তার তুলনা কি! যার প্রেমে জগত সুখী
হেরিলে জুড়ায় আঁখি, সামান্যে কি দেখিতে পারে তারে!
তারে যে দেখেছে সেই মজেছে ছাই দিয়ে সংসারে
(মরি হায়! হায় রে!)
(ও সে) না জানি কুহক জানে
অলক্ষ্যে মন চুরি করে, কটাক্ষে মন চুরি করে
কোথায় পাব তারে, আমার মনের মানুষ যে রে

কুল-মান সব গেলো রে! তবু না পেলাম তারে
প্রেমের লেষ নাই অন্তরে, তাইতে মরি দেয়না দেখা সে রে
ও তার বসত কোথায় না জেনে তাই গগন ভেবে মরে
(মরি হায়! হায় রে!)
(ও সে) মানুষের দিশ যদি জানিস
কৃপা করে বলে দে রে, আমার সুহৃদ হয়ে বলে দে রে
ব্যাথার ব্যাথি হয়ে বলে দে রে
কোথায় পাব তারে, আমার মনের মানুষ যে রে

হারায়ে সেই মানুষে, তার উদ্দেশে দেশ-বিদেশে
আমি দেশ-বিদেশে বেড়াই ঘুরে
কোথায় পাব তারে, আমার মনের মানুষ যে রে

Bengali Romanization

Ami kothay pabo tare,

Amar moner manush je re,
Haraye shei manushe, kaar uddeshe,
Desh bideshe, ami desh bideshe barai ghure.

Lage ei ridoy shoshi,
Shoda pran hoy udashi,
Pele mon koto khushi,
Dekhtam noyon bhore.

Ami premanol e morchi jole nivai,
Kamon kore!
Mori hay hay re, ami,
O taar bichchede pran kamon kore.
Dakna tora, ore dakhna tora ridoy chire.

Dibo taar tulona ki!
Jaar preme jagat shukhi,
Herile jhuray aankhi,
Samanye ki dekhite pare tare!
Tare je dekheche shei mojheche,
Chai diye sangshare,
Mori hay hay re!
O se! Na jani kuhok jane,
Alokhe mon churi kore,
Katachhe mon churi kore,
Kothay pabo tare,
Amar moner manush je re!

Kul-man sob gelo re!
Tabu na pelam tare,
Premer lesh nai antore,
Tayte mori deyna dekha she re,
O taar basat kothay na jene,
Taygogon bhabe more!
Mori hay hay re!
O se! Manusher dish jodi jani,
Kripa kore bole de re,
Amar suhrid hoye bole de re,
Byathar byathi hoye bole de re.
Kothay pabo tare,
Amar moner manush je re!

Haraye shei manushe, kaar uddeshe,
Desh bideshe, ami desh bideshe barai ghure.
Kothay pabo tare,
Amar moner manush je re!

English Translation

Where can I find him,

The one who is the person of my heart?
I lost that person, and for him, I wander far and wide—
I travel across the country and abroad;
Where can I find him,
The one who is the person of my heart?

My heart burns like a moonlit night, always longing,
When I find him, my heart becomes happy,
I would gaze at him day and night, with my eyes full.
I am burning in the fire of love, how do I extinguish it?
Alas, I die, oh no—
How can I live without him,
Seeing my heart torn apart?
Where can I find him,
The one who is the person of my heart?

What comparison can I give him,
The one whose love brings happiness to the world!
When seen, his eyes calm the heart,
How can one understand his beauty in a trivial way?
Whoever has seen him, is enchanted and detached from worldly affairs.
Alas, I die, oh no—
He knows the magic,
Stealing hearts without a trace,
With a glance, he captures hearts;
Where can I find him,
The one who is the person of my heart?

All my social status is lost! Yet, I couldn’t find him,
There is no trace of love in my heart, and hence he doesn’t appear to me.
Where does he live? I don’t know, but I die thinking he is somewhere in the sky—
Alas, I die, oh no—
If you know where he is,
Please tell me, tell me as my friend,
Tell me as the one who shares my pain;
Where can I find him,
The one who is the person of my heart?
I lost that person, and for him, I wander far and wide—
I travel across the country and abroad;
Where can I find him,

The one who is the person of my heart?

== See also ==
- Baul
