= Bangamata (poem) =

1896 poem by Rabindranath Tagore

- by Rabindranath Tagore
- Country: India
- Language: Bengali
- Genre: Poem
- Publication date: 1896
- Lines: 14

"Bangamata" (Bengali: বঙ্গমাতা, English: "Mother Bengal") is a 14-line Bengali poem written by Rabindranath Tagore as part of his 1896 poetry book Chaitali.

== Background ==
Tagore wrote the poem "Bangamata" during the British Raj period in India, during which he perceived the Bengali's cultural heritage being erased. Unsatisfied with British rule, he wanted to encourage fellow Bengalis to perform national duties for Bengal.

== Transliteration ==
Punye pape dukkhe sukhe patane uthhane

Manus haite dao tomar santane

He snehartha bangabhumi–taba grihakrore

Chirasishu k'are ar rakhiyo na dhare.

Deshdeshantar-majhe jar jetha sthan

Khunjiya laite dao kariya sandhan.

Pade pade choto choto nishedher dore

Bendhe bendhe rakhiyo na bhalo chele k'are.

Praan diye, dukkho s'ahe, aponar hate

Sangram karite dao bhalomanda-sathe.

Shirna shanta sadhu taba putrader d'hare

Dao sabe grihachara lakkhichara k'are.

Saat koti santanere, hey mugdha janoni,

Rekhechho bangali kare–manus karo ni.

== Present day ==
Tagore's Bangamata has seen a resurgence in popularity among groups wishing to preserve Bengali culture.
