= Doel Square =

Square in Shahbag, Dhaka, Bangladesh

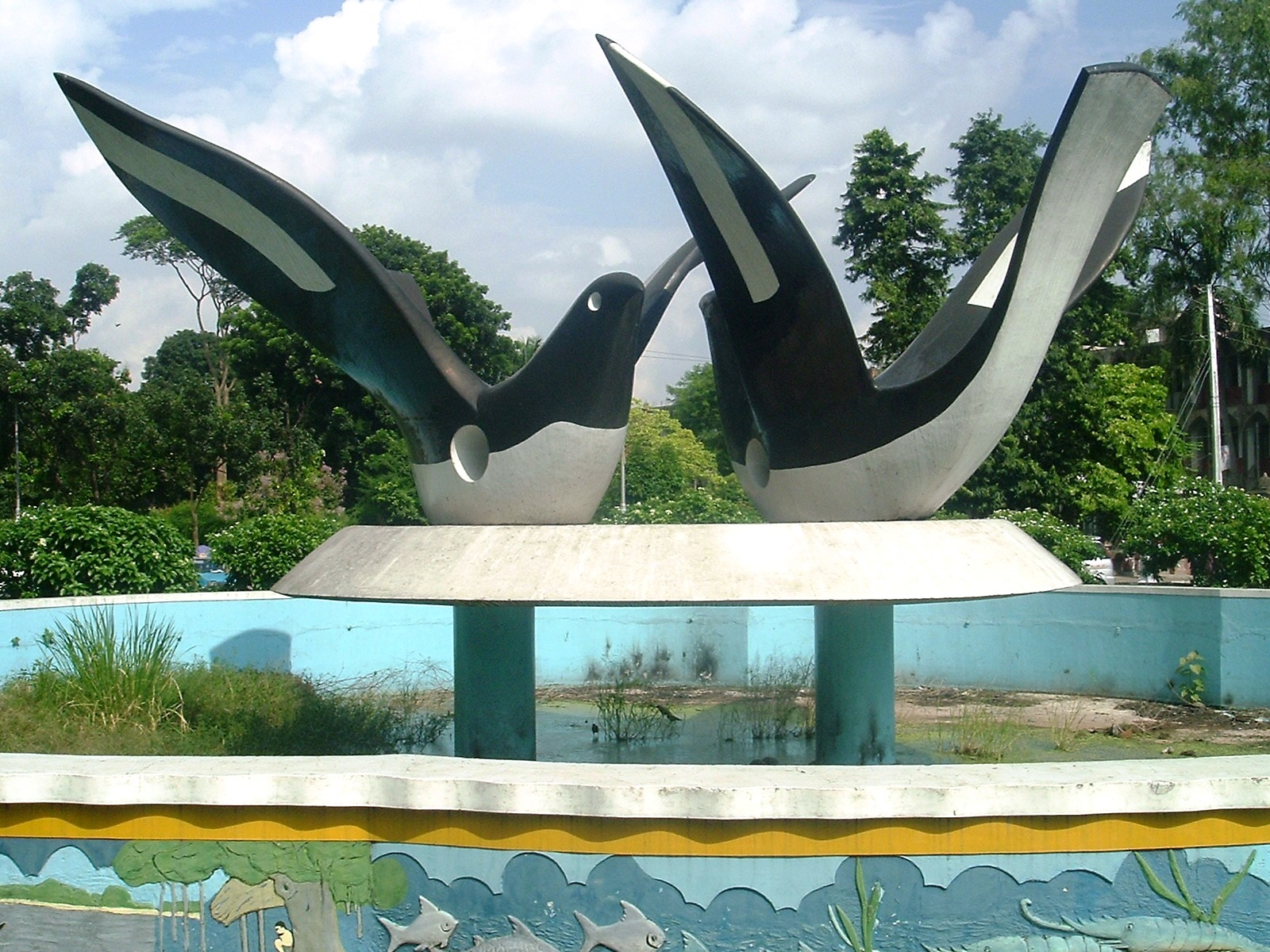
Doel Square monument in Dhaka

Doel Square (Bengali: দোয়েল চত্বর, Doel Chattar) is an area of the University of Dhaka campus located in Shahbag, Dhaka. There is a sculpture of two oriental magpie-robins in the middle of the area; the oriental magpie-robin is the national bird of Bangladesh and is locally known as the doyel or doel (Bengali: দোয়েল). The sculpture's architect is Azizul Jalil Pasha. The area serves as one of Bangladesh's most notable cultural hotspots.

== Location ==
It is located in front of Curzon Hall in the campus of the University of Dhaka.

== Area description ==
Doel Square is a popular place to shop for traditional Bangladeshi handicrafts including handmade bamboo, wooden, jute, pottery items and other decorative things.

Many different craftsmen have been known to set up shop in the Doel Square area; about 40 pottery shops as well as a total of 50 bamboo, cane and wood handicraft shops sell various decorative items here. The shops sell thousands of traditional Bangladeshi products; various clay utensils, small and large pots and pans of different sizes, pitchers, vases, decorative toys, earthen jars, cups and saucers, jugs, dishes, bowls, terracotta sculptures, clay fruits, ornaments, Baishakhi bangles, cane and wood showpiece, jute shikas, dolls, jute hand pars, jute side bags, hogla leaves and various kinds of coconut shell showpieces are found here. Also, carved palm leaf fans, bamboo flutes, kulo paintings, baskets, clay birds, boat replicas, ektaras, khartals, dhol drums, beaded garlands, village hut replicas and rural paintings are available.

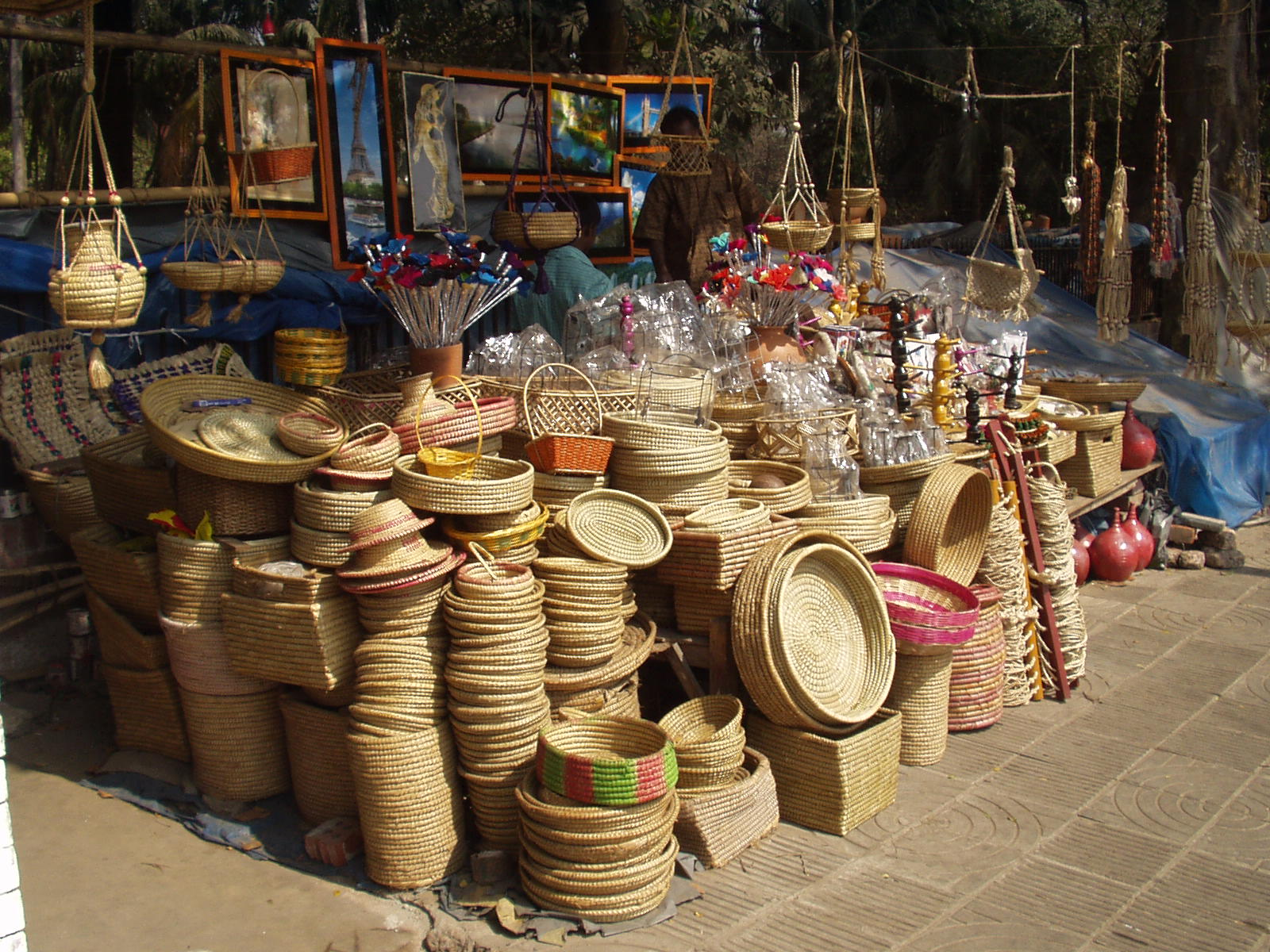
Handicraft shop in Doel Square

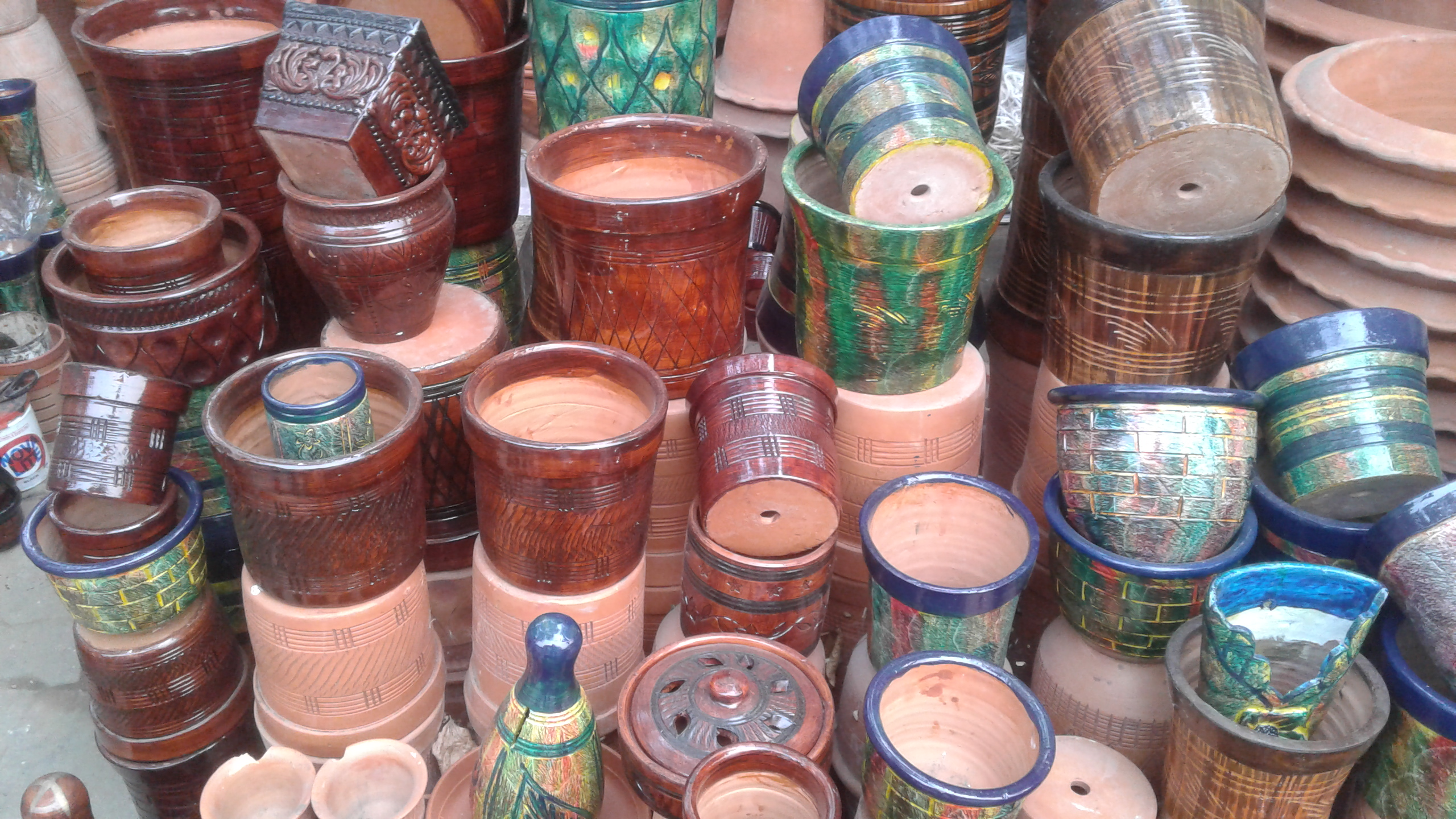
Items at a pottery shop

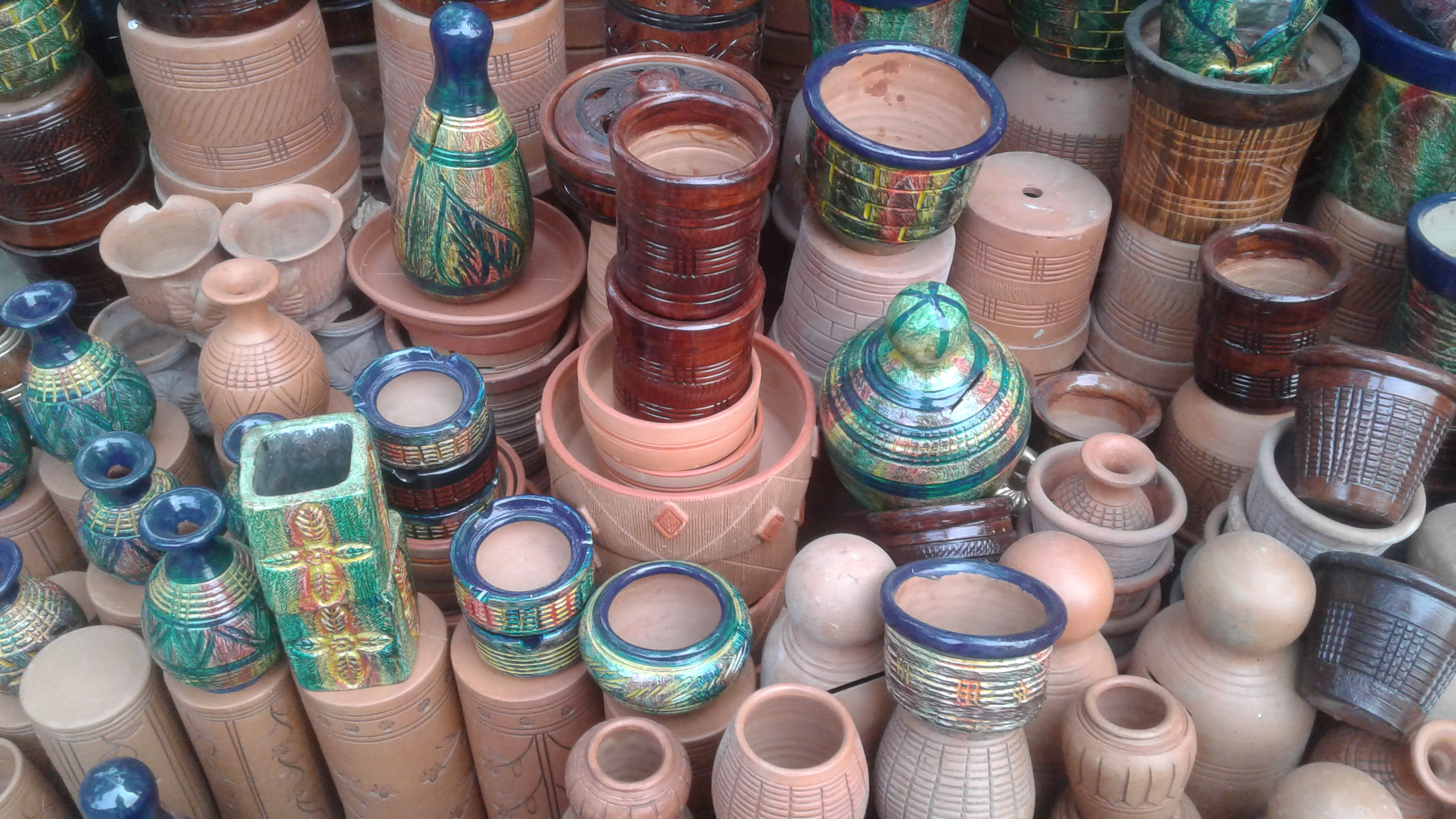
More pottery items at a shop

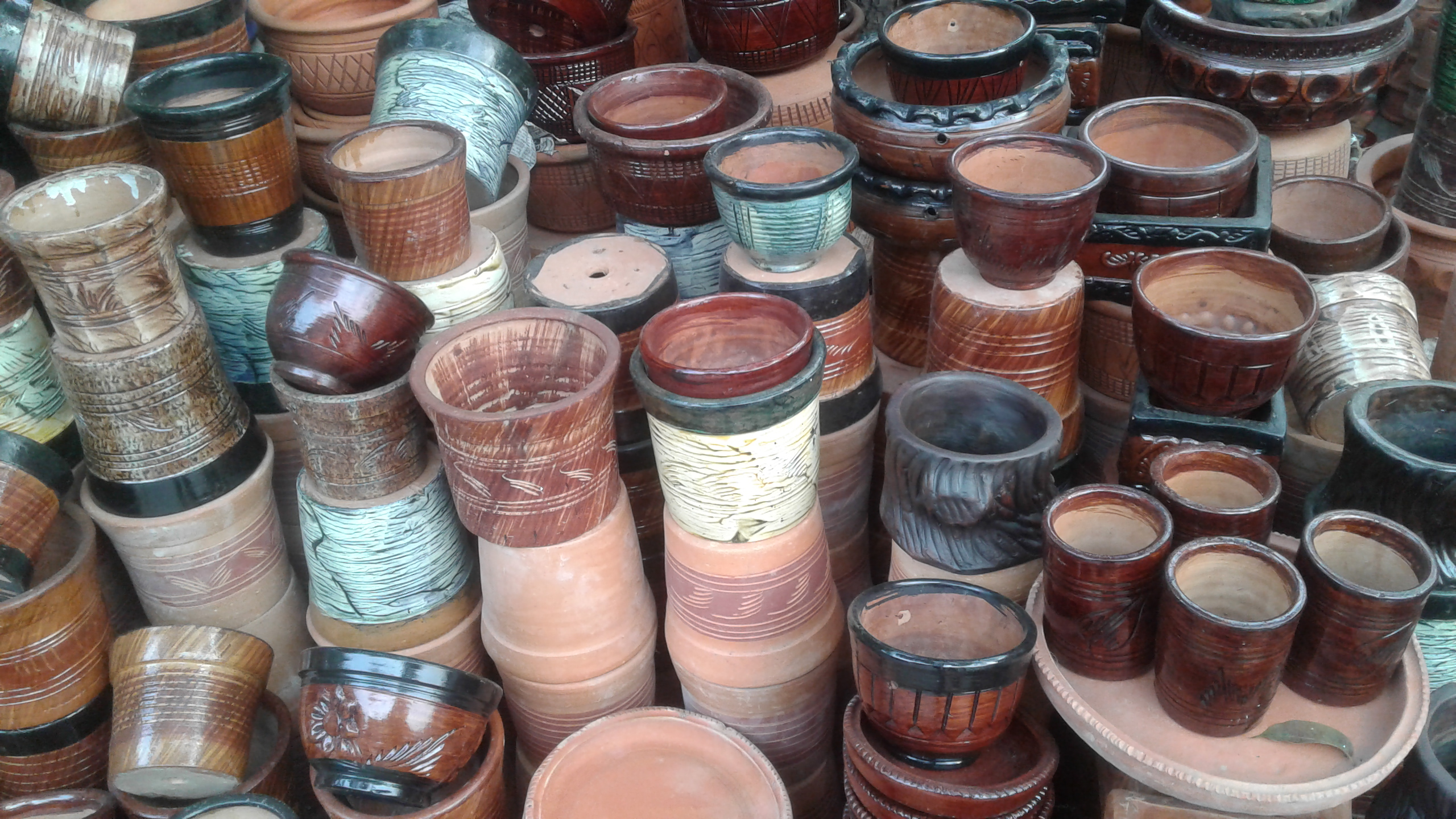
Other traditional pottery items

== See also ==
- Shapla Square
