= Bangadarshan =

Bengali literary magazine

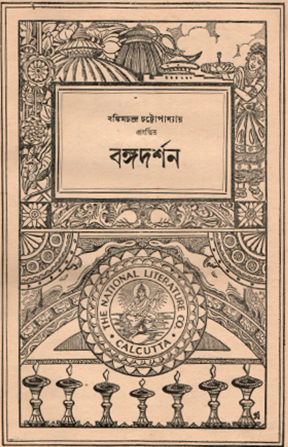
Cover page of Bangadarshan

Bangadarshan (Bengali: বঙ্গদর্শন) was a Bengali literary magazine founded by Bankim Chandra Chattopadhyay in 1872. It was revived in 1901 under the editorship of Rabindranath Tagore. The magazine played a defining role in shaping Bengali identity and fostering nationalism in Bengal.

Many of Bankim's novels were serialized in this magazine, which also featured work by writers such as the Sanskrit scholar Haraprasad Shastri, the literary critic Akshay Chandra Sarkar, and other intellectuals. The magazine included numerous articles on the Puranas, the Vedas, and the Vedanta, reflecting a reaction within Bengali intellectual community (the bhadralok culture) to "negotiate with the set of ideas coming in the name of modernity by incorporating and appropriating the masses."

Bankim articulated his objectives for creating the magazine as one of: "...making it the medium of communication and sympathy between the educated and the uneducated classes... the English language for good or evil has become our vernacular; and this tends daily to widen the gulf between the higher and lower ranks of Bengali society. Thus I think that we ought to disanglicise ourselves so as to speak to the masses in the language which they may understand." Haraprasad Shastri also echoed this spirit: "What is the purpose of Bangadarshan? Knowledge has to be filtered down.".

But the magazine was much more than a mere dispenser of intellectual knowledge. It offered an intoxicating mix of stories that readers eagerly anticipated, particularly the next installment of a novel by Bankim. In addition to its readership among the Bengali intelligentsia, the magazine was also widely read by Bengali-literate women.

The first novel to be serialized in the magazine was the stunning Vishabriksha ("poison tree") in 1873. It was followed by Indira the same year and Yugalanguriya in 1874. Indeed, nearly all of Bankim's subsequent novels were published in this magazine.

In 1876, after Radharani and Chandrashekhar had come out, the magazine faced a hiatus. After a short period, however, Bankim's brother Sanjibchandra Chattopadhyay revived the magazine, and Bankim remained a major contributor. His novels Rajani, Krishnakanter Will, and the Rajput novel Rajasimha were featured between 1877 and 1881. Particularly notable is the publication of Anandamath (1882), which tells the story of a revolt by a group of ascetic warriors. Although the battle is against the Muslim forces, the British power looms in the background. This novel also contains the song Bande Mataram.

The impact of the magazine in 19th-century Bengal can be gauged from Rabindranath Tagore's recollections of reading it as a boy - he was only eleven when Bangadarshan was launched. "It was bad enough to have to wait till the next monthly number was out, but to be kept waiting further till my elders had done with it was simply intolerable." Prof Santanu Banerjee observed: "There is hardly any magazine apart from Bangadarshan in the world to claim the glory of publishing two National Song[s] of two separate country [sic]".

In the late 1880s, the magazine was eventually no longer in publication.

== The "new" Bangadarshan ==
In 1901, a "new" Bangadarshan was published by Saileshchandra Majumdar with Rabindranath Tagore as its editor. Tagore edited the magazine until 1905. This magazine carried a large number of Tagore's writings; while he had been writing short stories until now, the pressures of the magazine got him into the genre of the novel: his first full-length novel, Chokher Bali was written for serialization in the magazine, and remains one of the most famous psychological novels in Bengali literature. The magazine was published on a monthly basis.

The philosophy of the magazine was similar to that of the earlier, and the aim was to fuel a budding nationalistic spirit. The publisher's office, called "Majumdar Library", became a meeting point for many intellectuals and literary spirits. During the Bangabhanga Andolan (1905 Partition of Bengal), the magazine became a hotbed of protest. A large number of poems from Tagore's Gitanjali period (and earlier) also came out in the magazine; this included Amar Sonar Bangla, today the national anthem of Bangladesh.
