= Dwijendralal Ray =

Indian civil servant, poet, playwright, and musician

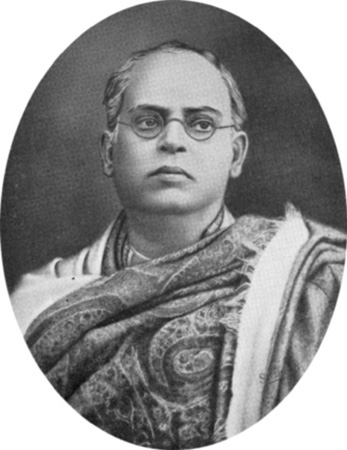
- Dwijendralal Ray
- Born: 19 July 1863; Krishnanagar, Nadia District, Bengal Presidency, British India (now West Bengal, India)
- Died: 17 May 1913 (aged 49); Calcutta, Bengal Presidency, British India (now West Bengal, India)
- Occupations: Civil servant, playwright and musician
- Spouse: Surabala Devi
- Children: 2, including Dilip Kumar Roy
- Writing career
- Language: Bengali
- Period: Bengal Renaissance
- Genres: Drama, Song, Essay
- Movement: Bengal Renaissance

Dwijendralal Ray (19 July 1863 – 17 May 1913), also known as D. L. Ray, was a Bengali poet, playwright, and musician. He was known for his Hindu mythological and nationalist historical plays and songs known as Dwijendrageeti or the Songs of Dwijendralal, which number over 500, create a separate subgenre of Bengali music.

== Early life and education ==
=== Early life ===
Dwijendralal Ray was born in Krishnanagar, Nadia, in the modern-day Indian state of West Bengal, on 19 July 1863. He was the seventh child of Kartikeyachandra Ray, Dewan (Chief Officer) of Krishnanagar palace. From his mother's side, he was a descendant of Vaishnava ascetic Advaita Acharya, one of the apostles of the medieval Bengali saint Shri Chaitanya. Ray had six elder brothers and a younger sister.

As a child, Ray was temperamental, introverted, thoughtful and a lover of nature, although he possessed the gift of the gab. He passed the Entrance Examination in 1878 and the First Arts Examination in 1880 at the Krishnanagar Collegiate School. Later, he received a B.A. from Hooghly College and subsequently an M.A. in English in 1884 from Presidency College, Calcutta, as a graduating student of the University of Calcutta. Being a brilliant student, he received a scholarship owing to his performance in the Entrance and First Arts examinations, and was second among all students receiving M.A. degrees from the University of Calcutta in 1884.

Aryagatha Part I, a collection of Ray's songs written between the ages of twelve and seventeen, was published in 1882. It was his first publication.

=== In England ===
In 1884, Ray got a state scholarship for study of agriculture in England. "His description of the sea-voyage and his keen observation on the manners, customs, food-habits and dresses of British people" was serialised in a weekly named Pataka and later published by his brothers as Bileter Patra (Letters from England).While in England, he received the news of his beloved parents' death. In 1886, he published The Lyrics of Ind, a collection of English lyrical poems written in England.

Ray Passed the examination from the Cirencester College and was enrolled as a member of the Royal Agricultural College and the Royal Agricultural Society. After obtaining a diploma in F.R.A.S., he returned to India in 1886.

=== Career ===
On his return from England, Ray was appointed as a Deputy Magistrate in 1886 and worked in the Departments of Survey and Settlement, Excise, Land Records and Agriculture, Administration and Judiciary in different parts of Bengal, Bihar and Central Province. In 1887, Ray married Surabala Devi, daughter of Pratap Chandra Majumdar, a renowned homeopath physician. In 1890, he was transferred to Kajlagarh as the land settlement officer of the Sujamutha division of Medinipur, he diligently worked and even led a peasant protest against the excessive tax rates. He composed some of his best works there. He was appointed the First Inspector of the Excise Department in 1894, the Assistant Director, Land Records and Agriculture Department in 1898 and the Assistant to the Commissioner, Excise Department in 1900. Later again he was appointed Inspector of Excise Department.

Surabala Devi died in 1903. In 1905, Ray was transferred to Khulna. Later he served at Murshidabad, Kandi, Gaya and Jahanabad also. In 1908, he took long leave to stay in Calcutta. Next year, he was appointed Deputy Magistrate of 24 Parganas. In 1912, he was transferred to Bankura and within three months he was again transferred to Munger where he had fallen seriously ill and due to this illness he took voluntary retirement and returned to Calcutta.

=== Last days ===
In the same year, Ray started editing a journal named Bharatbarsha. But he did not live more than two months after his retirement. He died of a sudden attack of epilepsy on 17 May 1913 in Kolkata.

== Political activity ==
Though from a landed Bengali aristocratic family, Ray was known for his pro-peasant sentiments. In 1890, while working for the government at Kajlagarh, in Purba Medinipur he clashed with the Bengal Governor on the issue of peasant land rights and tithing obligations. He valiantly protested against the excessive tax that the peasants and small landowners had to pay to the Jotedars.

Following the 1905 Partition of Bengal, Ray joined the cultural movement to reunite the two new Bengali provinces. It was during the time he wrote several patriotic songs, including "Dhana Dhanya Pushpa Bhara", that are still immensely popular today.

He was known also for his commitment to the uplifting of women, and his strong stance against Hindu religious orthodoxy and ritual. His collection Hanshir Gaan was a satire against upper-caste Hindu dominance of religious practices.

== Personal life ==
Dwijendralal Ray was a son of Kartikeyachandra Ray, who was a Dewan (Chief Officer) of the Nadia Raj dynasty. He and his wife Surabala Devi had a son, Dilipkumar, and a daughter, Maya. Dilipkumar Roy was a famous musician, singer, musicologist, novelist, poet, essayist and yogi.
