= Gagan Harkara =

Bengali Baul poet

Gaganchandra Dash
- গগনচন্দ্র দাস
- Born: Gaganchandra Dash c. 1845; Commercolly, Bengal, British India
- Died: 12 August 1910 (aged 64–65); Kushtia, Bengal, British India
- Occupations: Poet; composer; postman

Gaganchandra Dash (Bengali: গগনচন্দ্র দাস; 1845–1910), mostly known as Gagan Harkara (Bengali: গগন হরকরা), was a Bengali Baul poet

== Early life and background ==
Gagan Harkara resided in Kasba village of Kumarkhali Upazila in Kushtia, located in present-day Bangladesh. Employed as a postman at the Shelaidaha Post Office in Kumarkhali, he became popularly known as "Harkara"—a Bengali term that translates to "postman." During Rabindranath Tagore’s extended stays in Shelaidaha, Gagan regularly delivered and collected correspondence on his behalf. Tagore frequently mentioned Gagan in his letters, many of which were later compiled in Chinnapatra, addressed to his niece Indira Devi (Tagore, Chinnapatra).[4]

Rabindranath Tagore was also instrumental in introducing Gagan's work to a broader audience. He first published one of Gagan's songs in Prabashi Patra, a literary magazine, in the Bengali year 1322 (1915 CE) (Tagore, Prabashi Patra).[2] Furthermore, Tagore's niece, Sarala Devi Chaudhurani, contributed an essay entitled Lalon Fakir and Gagan to Bharati, a journal affiliated with the Tagore family. In this piece, she included two of Gagan's notable songs: Ami Kothai Pabo Tare and (O Mon) Asar Mayai Bhule Robe.[2] Tagore is known to have collected Gagan's songs as early as 1889.

== Legacy ==
Where shall I meet him, the Man of my Heart?
He is lost to me and I seek him wandering from land to land.
I am listless for that moonrise of beauty,
which is to light my life,
which I long to see in the fullness of vision
in gladness of heart.

— "Ami Kothay Pabo Tare", Gagan Harkara

Rabindranath Tagore referred to Gagan and his songs in his article: An Indian Folk Religion, songs and speeches. Rabindranath Tagore wrote a short story too (The Postmaster) partly after his life. Based upon the story, Satyajit Ray made his film: The Postmaster.

Tagore mentioned the following about Gagan:

In the same village I came into touch with some Baul singers. I had known them by their names, occasionally seen them singing and begging in the street, and so passed them by, vaguely classifying them in my mind under the general name of Vairagis, or ascetics.

The time came when I had occasion to meet with some members of the same body and talk to them about spiritual matters. The first Baul song, which I chanced to hear with any attention, profoundly stirred my mind. Its words are so simple that it makes me hesitate to render them in a foreign tongue, and set them forward for critical observation. Besides, the best part of a song is missed when the tune is absent; for thereby its movement and its colour are lost, and it becomes like a butterfly whose wings have been plucked. The first line may be translated thus: 'Where shall I meet him, the Man of my Heart?' This phrase, 'the Man of my Heart,' is not peculiar to this song, but is usual with the Baul sect. It means that, for me, the supreme truth of all existence is in the revelation of the Infinite in my own humanity. 'The Man of my Heart,' to the Baul, is like a divine instrument perfectly tuned. He gives expression to infinite truth in the music of life. And the longing for the truth which is in us, which we have not yet realised, breaks out in the "Ami Kothay Pabo Tare". The name of the poet who wrote this song was Gagan. He was almost illiterate; and the ideas he received from his Baul teacher found no distraction from the self-consciousness of the modern age. He was a village postman, earning about ten shillings a month, and he died before he had completed his teens. The sentiment, to which he gave such intensity of expression, is common to most of the songs of his sect. And it is a sect, almost exclusively confined to that lower floor of society, where the light of modern education hardly finds an entrance, while wealth and respectability shun its utter indigence.

In the song I have translated above, the longing of the singer to realize the infinite in his own personality is expressed. This has to be done daily by its perfect expression in life, in love. For the personal expression of life, in its perfection, is love; just as the personal expression of truth in its perfection is beauty.
