= Vive, viva, and vivat =

Interjections in Romance languages

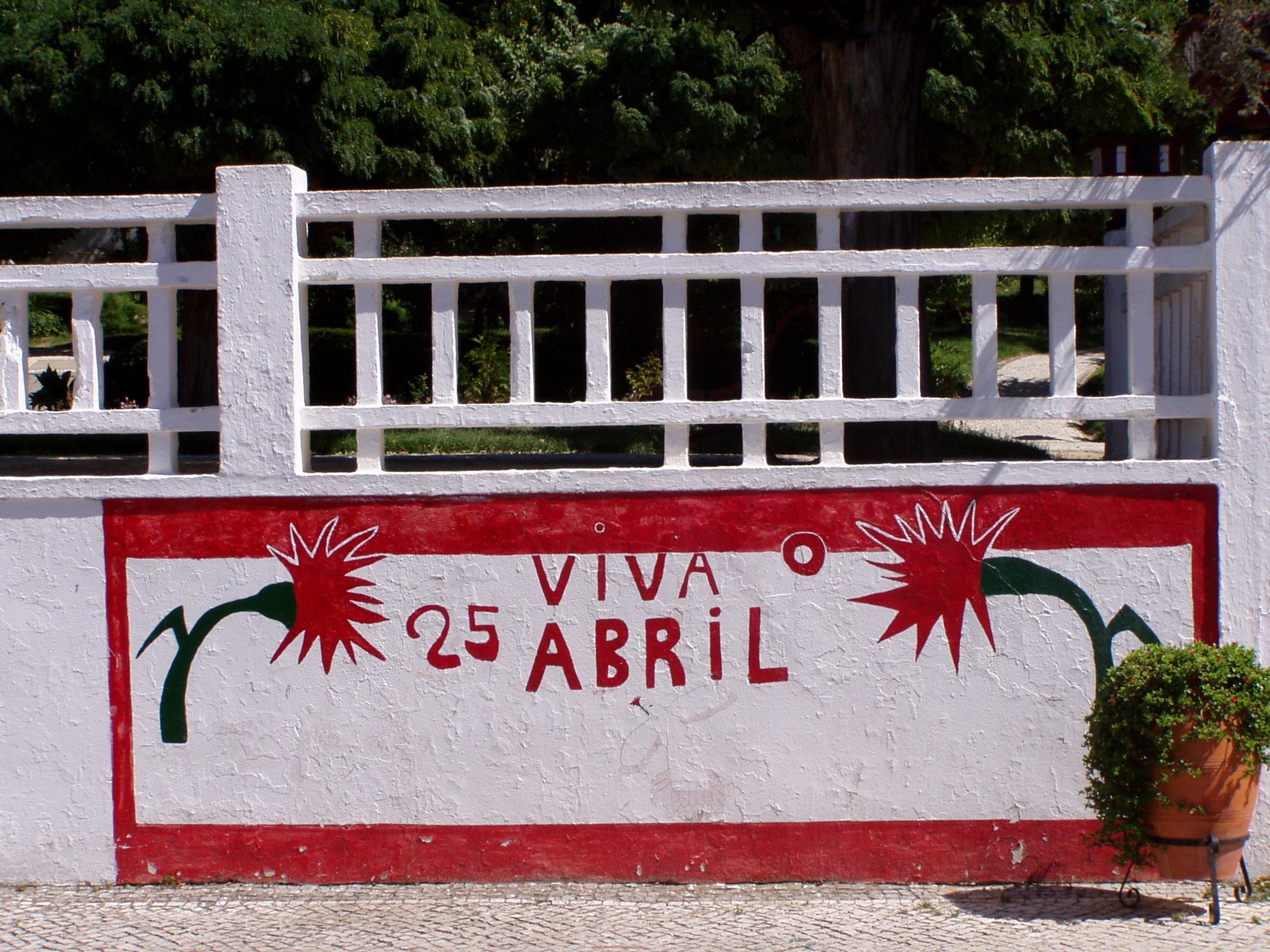
Viva o 25 de abril graffiti in Portugal.

Viva, vive, and vivat are interjections used in the Romance languages. Viva in Spanish (plural Vivan), Portuguese (plural Vivam), and Italian (Also evviva. Vivano in plural is rare), Vive in French, and Vivat in Latin (plural Vivant) are subjunctive forms of the verb "to live." Being the third-person (singular or plural agreeing with the subject), subjunctive present conjugation, the terms express a hope on the part of the speaker that another should live. Thus, they mean "(may) he/she/it/they live!" (the word "may" is implied by the subjunctive mood) and are usually translated to English as "long live."

They are often used to salute a person or non-personal entity: "Vive le Québec libre" (from Charles de Gaulle's Vive le Québec libre speech in Montreal), or "Viva il Duce!" the rough equivalent in Fascist Italy of the greeting, "Heil Hitler." In addition, in monarchical times, the king of France would be wished "Vive le Roi!" and the king of Italy "Viva il Re!" both meaning "May the king live!" or "Long live the king!"

== Overview ==
The acclamation "Vivat!" is still used in British coronations when the sovereign is hailed while processing from the quire of Westminster Abbey towards the coronation theatre, fronting the altar. The shouts are delivered by the King or Queen's Scholars of Westminster School, who by tradition are the first to acclaim the sovereign at the ceremony. This was last performed when King Charles III was crowned in 2023; he was greeted with "Vivat, Rex! / Vivat, Rex Carolus! / Vivat! Vivat! Vivat!" which was incorporated into Hubert Parry's anthem, I was glad.

The mediaeval university Latin anthem De Brevitate Vitae has verses like:

Vivat academia!
Vivant professores!
Vivat academia!
Vivant professores!
Vivat membrum quodlibet
Vivant membra quaelibet
Semper sint in flore.

Compare ¡Viva el rey! with ¡Vivan los reyes!

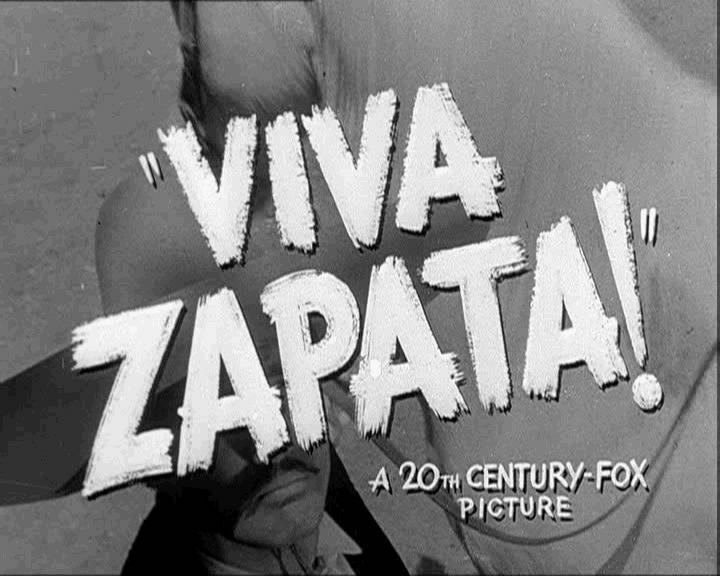
A frame from the trailer for Viva Zapata!

The Mexican slogan "¡Viva Zapata!" was used to title the 1952 English-language biographical drama film Viva Zapata! by Elia Kazan, about Emiliano Zapata. It later inspired the title of 2005 Italian-language documentary film Viva Zapatero! by Sabina Guzzanti, referring to José Luis Rodríguez Zapatero.

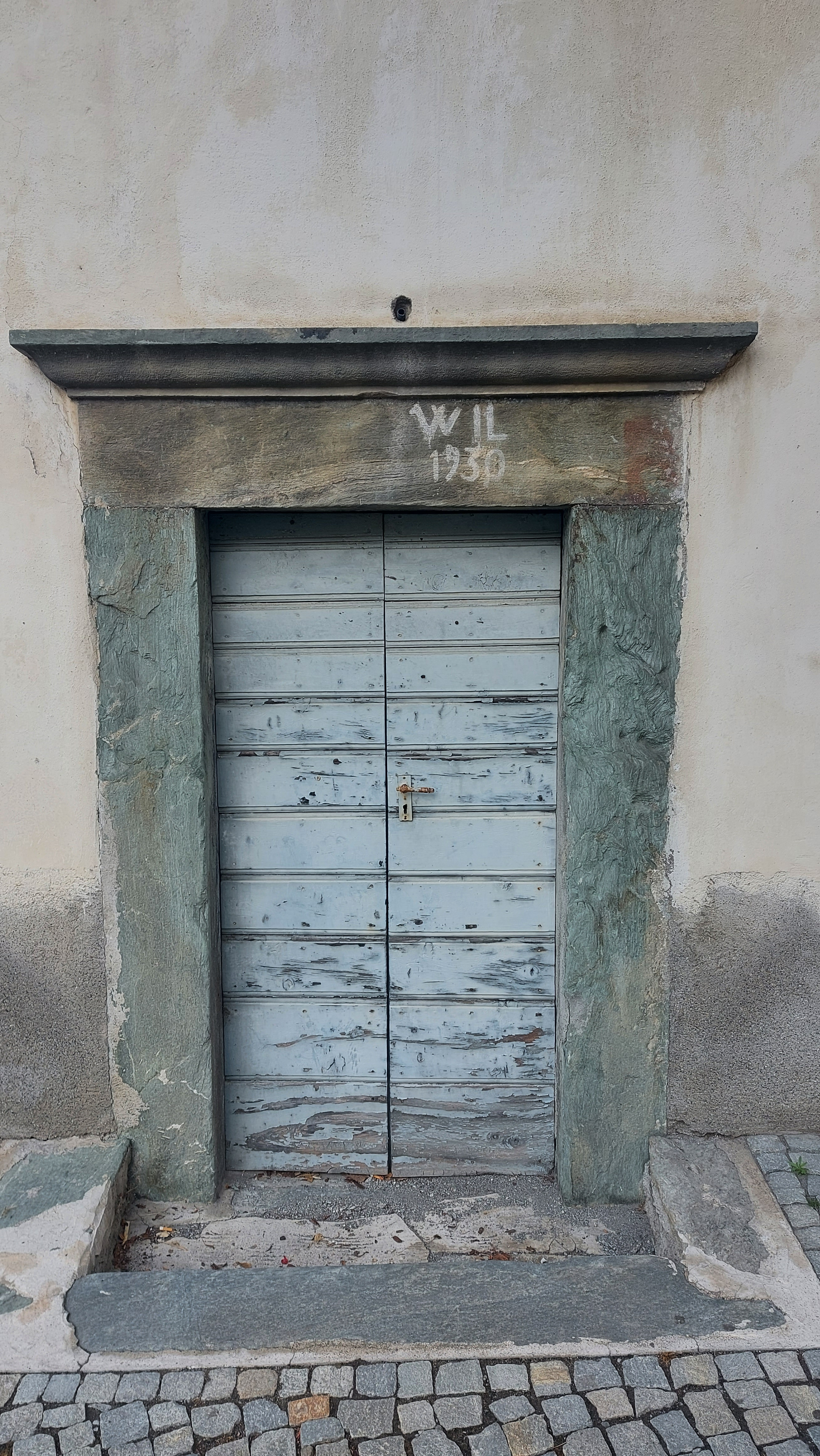
A door frame in Mazzo di Valtellina, commemorating the conscripts of 1930.

In Italy, the nationalist phrase Viva Vittorio Emanuele Re d'Italia! ("Long live Victor Emmanuel King of Italy") was hidden from Austrian enemies by its acronym Viva VERDI! so to make it pass for a praise of the music of Giuseppe Verdi. In Italian graffiti, vivais often abbreviated as W, a letter otherwise foreign to Italian. It may be written as a monogram of two interlaced ⟨V⟩. The opposite concept abbasso ("Down with") is abbreviated with an inverted W.

In the Philippines, (a former Spanish colony), the usage of ¡Viva! has declined in the 20th century, having been replaced by the Filipino term Mabuhay and its cognates in various Philippine languages. Today, the expression is largely found in religious contexts (specifically, Filipino Catholicism), where it is said in fiestas to honour a manifestation of God or a patron saint (e.g. "¡Viva, Señor Santo Niño!" "¡Viva la Virgen de Peñafrancia!").

=== Other and similar uses ===
The use of these terms has increased in non-Latin nations recently; for example, a common greeting regarding the Anglophone city of Las Vegas is "Viva Las Vegas!" One reason may be that West Germanic languages do not have a good equivalent of the term; the closest equivalent may be Heil in German, which has Nazi-tainted connotations, or Hail or Wassail in English. Nevertheless, Hail still appears in certain previously frozen expressions and usages, for example the prayer Hail Mary and the song Hail to the Chief.

A similar expression is 'Zindabad' used in Hindustani, Bengali and Persian, it means roughly "Long live" and is used as a patriotic sentiment glorifying leaders and countries e.g. 'Pakistan Zindabad' or 'Bangladesh Zindabad'.

On 25 July 2005, upon winning his seventh consecutive Tour de France and subsequently retiring from professional cycling, Lance Armstrong ended his farewell speech with "Vive le Tour, forever".

In then-Communist Romania, North Korea, Indonesia and several countries, "long live" used to congratulate the anniversary of a party, institution and a nation's foundation day. For example in Indonesia, Dirgahayu HUT ke-... Republik Indonesia (Long live the ...[st/nd/th] anniversary of the Republic of Indonesia).

== See also ==
- Joy Bangla, a salutation, slogan, and war cry most commonly used in People's Republic of Bangladesh and West Bengal
- L'Chaim!, a Hebrew toast, meaning "to life"
- Mabuhay, a Filipino word of the same meaning used in greeting and acclamation
- Hindustan Zindabad, used by Indians to express victory or patriotism
- Sto lat, a Polish birthday song wishing 100 years, and a similar greeting wish
- Ten thousand years, translation of a phrase used in many East Asian languages to wish leaders long lives
