= Zindabad =

Zindabad (Persian: زنده باد, romanized: zinda bād) is a word of Persian origin used as a shout of encouragement or as a cheer, and literally means 'Long live [idea or person]'. It is often used as a political slogan, to praise a country, movement, or leader.

Zindabad may more specifically refer to:

== Politics ==
- Hindustan Zindabad, a patriotic slogan in India
- Inquilab Zindabad, a pro-revolutionary slogan originating against British rule in India
- Pakistan Zindabad, a patriotic slogan in Pakistan
- Bangladesh Zindabad, a patriotic slogan in Bangladesh
- Khalistan Zindabad Force, a militant group in India

== Films ==
- Dulavai Zindabad, a 2017 Bangladeshi film
- Jawani Zindabad, a 1990 Indian Hindi-language film by Arun Bhatt
- Mazdoor Zindabaad, a 1976 Indian Hindi-language film
- Rakthasakshikal Sindabad, a 1998 Indian Malayalam-language film
- Sasura Ghara Zindabad, a 2010 Indian Oriya-language film
- Sasurbari Zindabad, a 2000 Indian Bengali-language film
- Shankar Dada Zindabad, a 2007 Indian Telugu-language film, a remake of Munna Bhai
- Shoshurbari Zindabad, a 2002 Bangladeshi film
- Swantham Bharya Zindabad, a 2010 Indian Malayalam-language film

== Music ==
- "Pakistan Zindabad" (anthem), a Bengali patriotic song which used to be the anthem of East Pakistan (now Bangladesh)

== See also ==
- Zinda (disambiguation)
- Abad (disambiguation)
