= Ten thousand years =

East Asian phrase used to wish long life

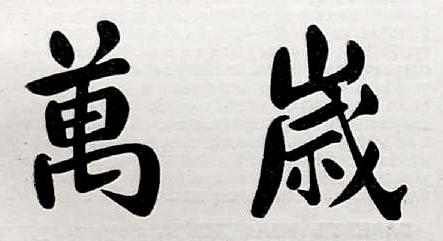

Chinese name
- Traditional Chinese: 萬歲
- Simplified Chinese: 万岁
Transcriptions
Standard Mandarin
- Hanyu Pinyin: wànsuì
- Bopomofo: ㄨㄢˋ ㄙㄨㄟˋ
- Gwoyeu Romatzyh: wannsuey
- Wade–Giles: wan^{4}-sui^{4}
Wu
- Romanization: vae^{去} soe^{去}
Hakka
- Romanization: van^{4} soi^{4}
Yue: Cantonese
- Yale Romanization: maahn seui
- Jyutping: maan^{6} seoi^{3}
Southern Min
- Hokkien POJ: bān soè

Vietnamese name
- Vietnamese alphabet: vạn tuế muôn tuổi muôn năm
- Chữ Hán: 萬歲
- Chữ Nôm: 𨷈𣦮 𨷈𢆥

Korean name
- Hangul: 만세
- Hanja: 萬歲
Transcriptions
- Revised Romanization: manse

Japanese name
- Hiragana: ばんざい
- Kyūjitai: 萬歲
- Shinjitai: 万歳
Transcriptions
- Revised Hepburn: banzai

In various East Asian languages such as Chinese, Japanese, Korean, and Vietnamese, the phrase wànsuì, banzai, manse, and vạn tuế, respectively, meaning myriad years is used to wish long life, and is typically translated as "long live" in English. The phrase originated in ancient China as an expression used to wish long life to the emperor. Due to the historical political and cultural influence of Chinese culture on the East Asian cultural sphere, in the area, and in particular of the Classical Chinese language, cognates with similar meanings and usage patterns have appeared in many East Asian languages and Vietnamese. In some countries, this phrase is mundanely used when expressing feeling of triumph, typically shouted by crowds.

== China ==
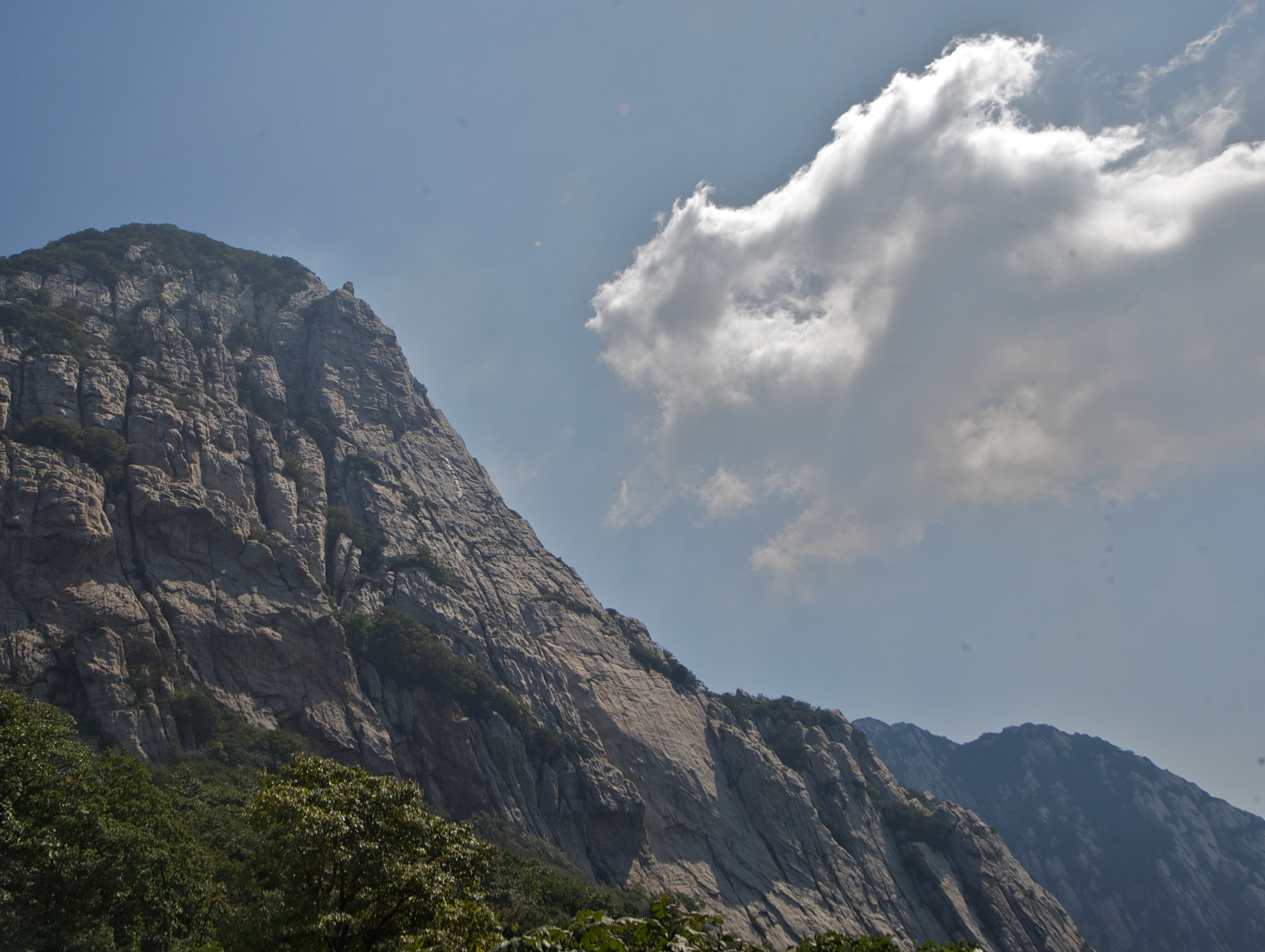
Mount Song, the location where the phrase "Ten thousand years" was coined

In Chinese, ten thousand or "myriad" is the largest numerical order of magnitude in common usage, and is used ubiquitously as a synonym for "indefinitely large number". The term wansui (萬歲), literally meaning "ten thousand years", is thus used to describe a very long life, or even immortality for a person.

Although the First Emperor of Qin also wished "ten thousand generations" (万世) for his imperial rule, the use of wansui was probably coined during Han dynasty. In 110 BC, Emperor Wu of Han was addressed by the phrase "Wansui" during a heaven ritual on Mount Song. According to legend, Mount Song itself called out the phrase to address the emperor. During the Tang dynasty, it came to be used exclusively to address the emperor as a prayer for his long life and reign. Then, during the Five Dynasties and Ten Kingdoms period, its use was temporarily extended to include certain higher-ranking members of the imperial court, but this tradition was relatively short-lived: in later imperial history, using it to address someone other than the emperor was considered an act of sedition and was consequently highly dangerous. During certain reigns of weak emperors, powerful eunuchs such as Liu Jin and Wei Zhongxian circumvented this restriction by styling themselves with jiǔ qiān suì (九千歲, literally "9,000 years") so as to display their high positions, which were close to or even exceeded the emperor's, while still remaining reverent to the title of the emperor.

Traditionally, empresses consort and empresses dowager were addressed with "thousand years" (千歲) rather than "ten thousand years", which was reserved for the emperor exclusively. However, Empress Dowager Cixi, the de facto supreme ruler of China from 1861 to 1908, was addressed with "ten thousand years". Several photographs of her show a banner on her litter reading "The Incumbent Holy Mother, the Empress Dowager of the Great Qing, [may she live and reign for] ten thousand years, ten thousand years, ten thousand of ten thousand years" (大清國當今聖母皇太后萬歲萬歲萬萬歲). The Emperor was addressed by the title "Lord of Ten Thousand Years" (simplified Chinese: 万岁爷; traditional Chinese: 萬歲爺; pinyin: Wànsuìyé).

=== Usage ===
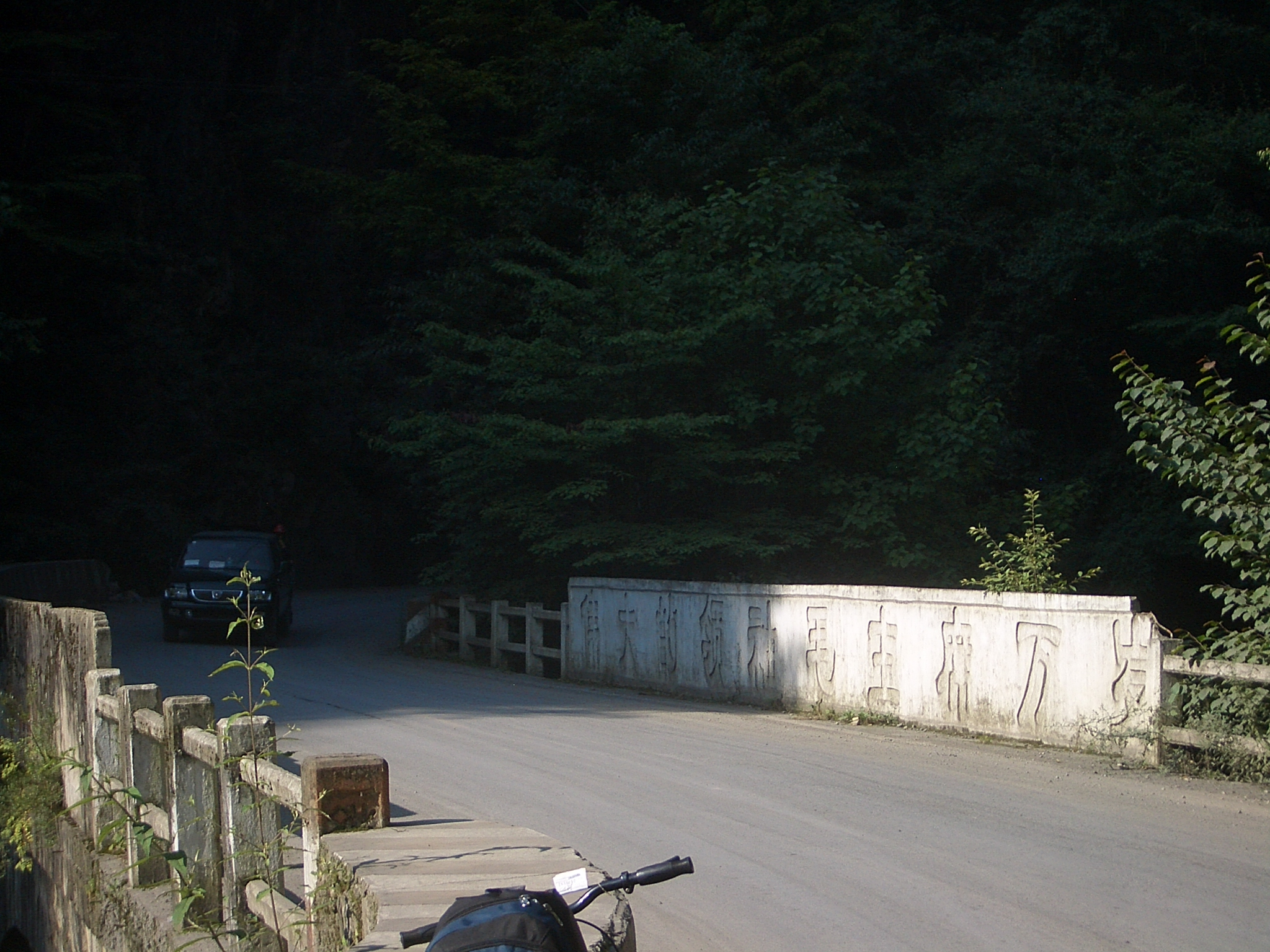
A late-1960s era bridge on G209 Highway in Shennongjia, Hubei, with the inscription "伟大的领袖毛主席万岁" (Long live the great leader Chairman Mao!)

Classically, the phrase wansui is repeated multiple times following a person's name or title. For example, in ancient China, the Emperor would be addressed with (Chinese: 吾皇萬歲，萬歲，萬萬歲; pinyin: Wú huáng wànsuì, wànsuì, wànwànsuì; lit. '[May] my Emperor [live and reign for] ten thousand years', 'ten thousand years', 'ten thousand of ten thousand years'). The foregoing phrase is best known to modern Chinese through televised films, but is not historically accurate; in the Ming dynasty, the only occasion during which 萬歲 is used is the great court, which was held one to three times a year. Approaching the end of the ceremony, the attending officials will be asked to shout 萬歲 three times.

The significance of "ten thousand" in this context is that "ten thousand" in Chinese and many other East Asian languages represents the largest discrete unit in the counting system, in a manner analogous to "thousand" in English. Thus 100,000 in Chinese is expressed as 10 ten-thousands; similarly, whereas a million is "a thousand thousands" in Western languages, the Chinese word for it is bǎiwàn (simplified Chinese: 百万; traditional Chinese: 百萬), which literally means "hundred ten-thousands". Because of this, Chinese people often use wàn in a manner analogous to "thousand" – whereas an English speaker might exclaim "there are thousands of ants on the ground", the Chinese speaker would substitute it with "ten thousand" in the description. So in the context of wànsuì, a literally incorrect but culturally appropriate translation might be, "may you live for thousands of years". The number simply denotes innumerability, in a manner etymologically similar to the Greek myriad (although the current usage of that word differs).

During the Qing, at the entrances of mosques in China, a tablet was placed upon which the characters for Huangdi, wansui, wansui, wanwansui (皇帝萬歲，萬歲，萬萬歲) were inscribed, which means, "The Emperor, may he live ten thousand years". Westerners traveling in China noted the presence of these tablets at mosques in Yunnan and Ningbo.

=== Modern use ===
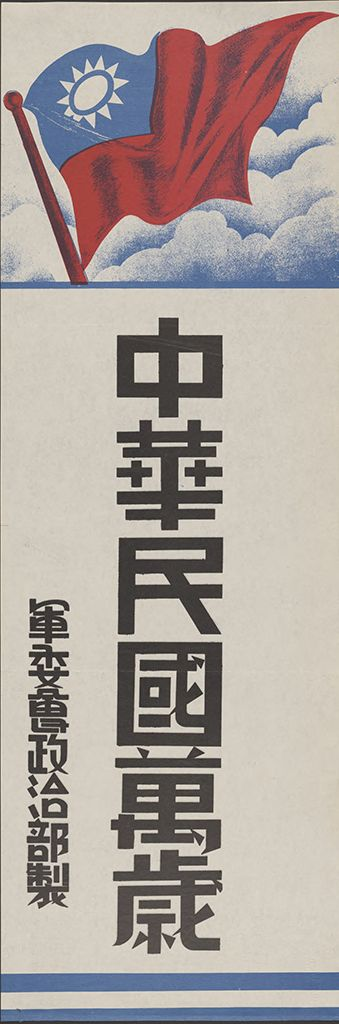
A poster proclaiming "Long live the Republic of China!"

During the Battle of Sihang Warehouse in 1937 during the Second Sino-Japanese War, Chinese civilians cheered "Zhōnghuá Mínguó wànsuì!" (Chinese: 中華民國萬歲！; lit. 'Long live the Republic of China!') after raising the Flag of the Republic of China on a flag-raising ceremony, to celebrate their victory over the Japanese.

In August 1945, after Generalissimo Chiang Kai-shek announced the defeat of Japan in the Second Sino-Japanese War, the people exclaimed "Jiǎng, Zhōngguó, wànsuì, wànwànsuì!" (蔣、中國、萬歲、萬萬歲！), which means, "Chiang, China, [may he/China] live ten thousand years, [may he/China] live for myriads upon myriads of years!".

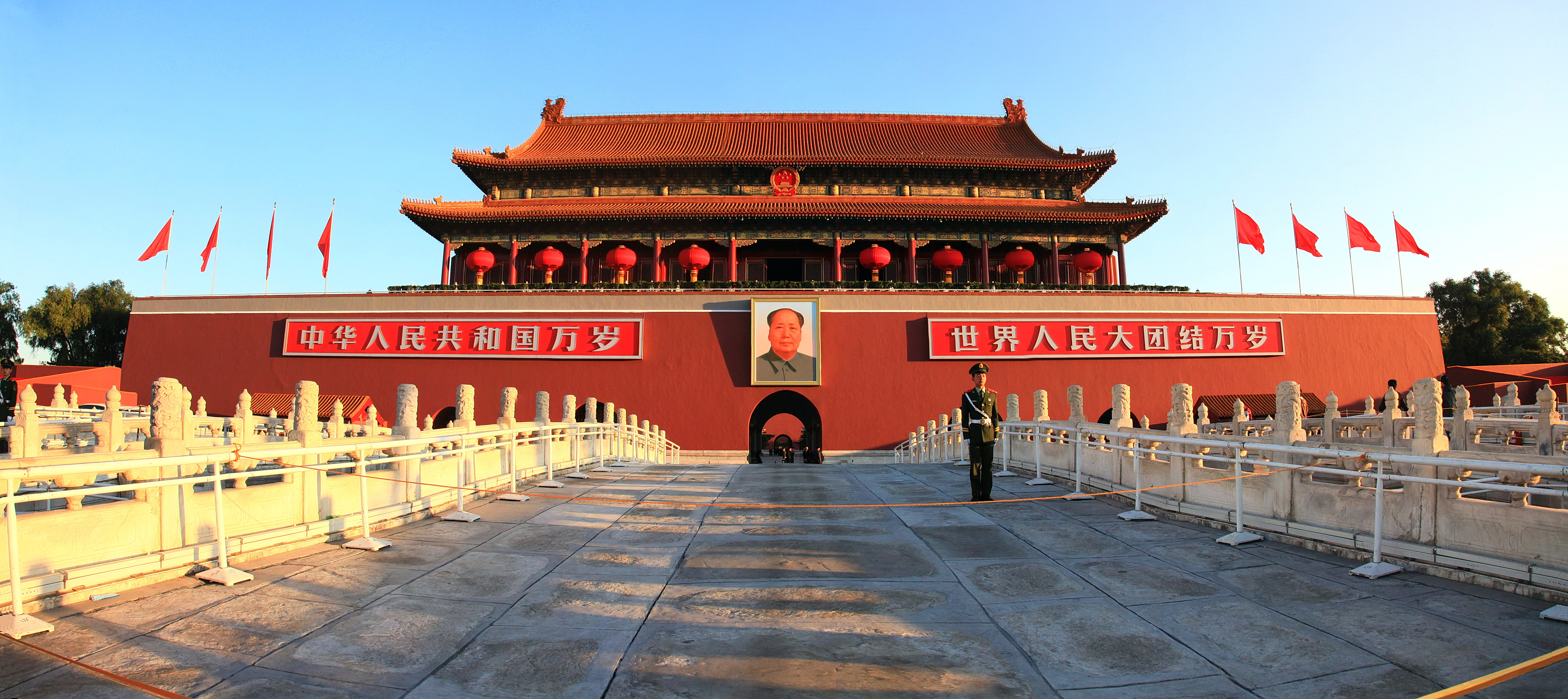
The two slogans that contain the term wànsuì ("Long live the People's Republic of China!", and "Long live the solidarity of the peoples of the world!") on the Tiananmen gatehouse in Beijing

One of the most conspicuous uses of the phrase is at the Tiananmen gate in Beijing, where large placards are affixed to the gatehouse reading "中华人民共和国万岁"; pinyin: Zhōnghuá Rénmín Gònghéguó wànsuì; lit. '[may the] People's Republic of China [last for] ten thousand years') and "世界人民大团结万岁"; pinyin: Shìjiè rénmín dàtuánjié wànsuì; lit. '[may] the Great Unity of the world's people [last for] ten thousand years').

During the Cultural Revolution, the saying 毛主席万岁 (pinyin: Máo Zhǔxí Wànsuì; lit. '[may] Chairman Mao [live for] ten thousand years!') was also common. After Mao's death, the phrase has never been used for any individual. Apart from these special cases, the phrase is almost never used in political slogans today. In casual conversation, however, the phrase is used simply as an exclamation of joy. For example, CCTV commentator Huang Jianxiang shouted "Yìdàlì wànsuì" (simplified Chinese: 意大利万岁; traditional Chinese: 義大利萬歲; lit. 'Italy ten thousand years!'; translated as "Forza Italia!" by some media) after Francesco Totti’s goal during Italy’s match against Australia in the 2006 FIFA World Cup. Taiwan-based singer Leehom Wang's 2007 album Change Me contains a song called "華人萬歲" (Húarén Wànsùi; 'Long Live Chinese People').

Within the Republic of China, shouting the phrase 中華民國萬歲; pinyin: Zhōnghuá mínguó wànsuì!; lit. '[may] the Republic of China [live for] ten thousand years!', translated as Long Live the Republic of China!) has been the final act ending presidential speeches on the National Day of the Republic of China, a tradition which was broken in 2016. It has been combined in recent years with another saying, 台灣民主萬歲 (Táiwān mínzhǔ wànsuì; '[may] a democratic Taiwan [live for] ten thousand years!', translated as Long Live the Democratic Taiwan!) When this is said, everyone raises their right fists while standing.

In Cantonese, "ten thousand years" (萬歲) can also be a slang term for treating others to foods and drinks.

== Japan ==
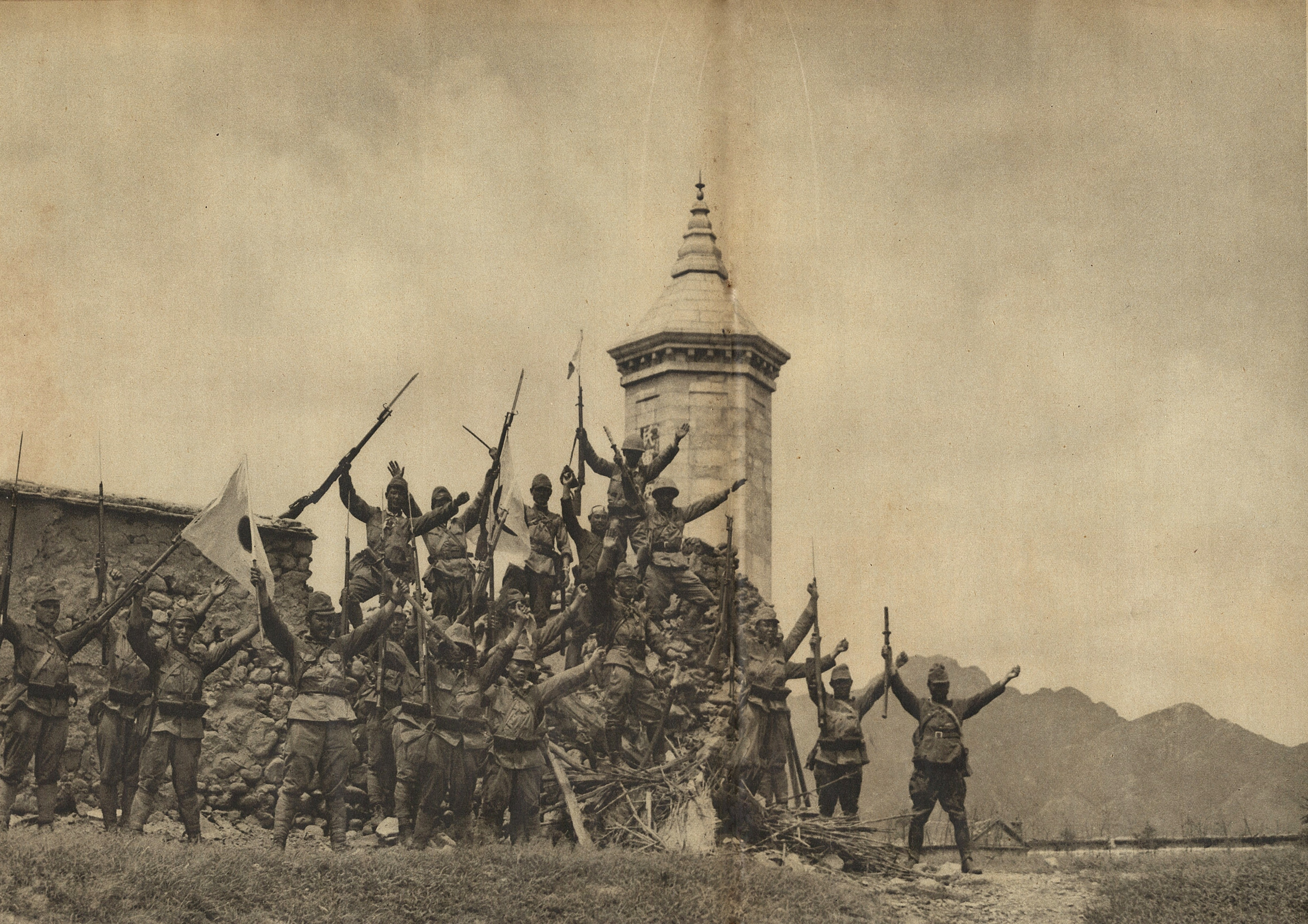
A group of Japanese soldiers during the Second Sino-Japanese War shouting "banzai!" near Beijing

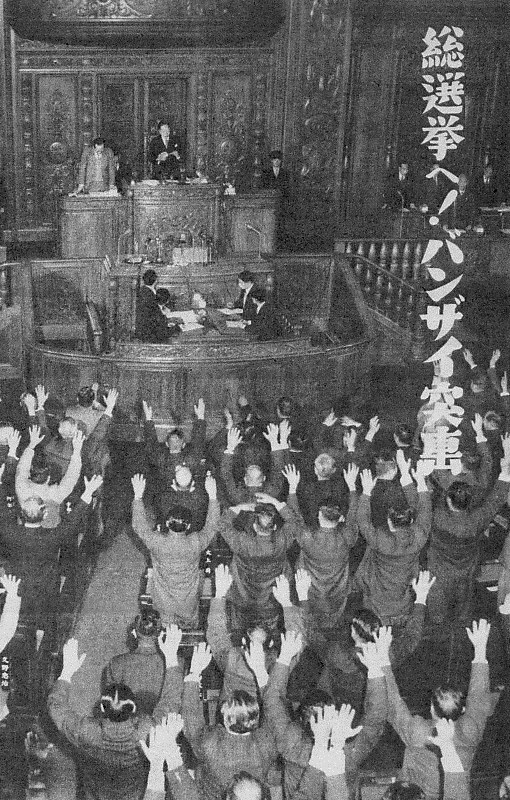
Banzai at dissolution of the House of Representatives (1953)

The Chinese term was introduced to Japan as banzai (万歳) as early as the 8th century, and was used to express respect for the Emperor in much the same manner as the Chinese term.

Even earlier, however, according to the Nihongi, during the reign of Empress Kōgyoku, A.D. 642, 8th Month, 1st Day:

The Emperor made a progress to the river source of Minabuchi. Here, (s)he knelt down and prayed, worshipping towards the four quarters and looking up to the Heaven. Straightway there was thunder and a great rain, which eventually fell for 5 days, and plentifully bedewed the Empire. Hereupon the peasantry throughout the Empire cried with one voice: "Banzai" and said "an Emperor of exceeding virtue".

Banzai as a formal ritual was established in the promulgation of the Meiji Constitution in 1889 when university students shouted banzai in front of the Emperor's carriage.

Around the same time, banzai also came to be used in contexts unrelated to the Emperor. The supporters of the Freedom and People's Rights Movement, for example, began to shout "Jiyū banzai" (自由万歳, lit. "Long Live Freedom") in 1883.

During World War II, banzai or its full form Tennōheika Banzai! (天皇陛下万歳; "Long Live His Majesty the Emperor") served as a battle cry of sorts for Japanese soldiers. Ideally, kamikaze pilots would shout "banzai!" as they rammed their planes into enemy ships; although Japanese popular culture has portrayed this romanticized scene, it is unknown if any pilot actually did so. Its confirmed use by ground troops, however, was heard in numerous battles during the Pacific Campaign, when Japanese infantry units attacked Allied positions. As a result, the term "banzai charge" (or alternatively "banzai attack") gained common currency among English-speaking soldiers and remains the most widely understood context of the term in the West to this day.

=== Modern use ===
Traditionally, "banzai" (roughly translated as "hurrah", literally translated as "ten thousand years") was an expression of enthusiasm, and crowds shouting the word three times, arms stretched out above their heads, could be considered the traditional Japanese form of applause. More formally, the word is shouted three times during the dissolution of the House of Representatives, and also as an acclamation at the enthronement of the Japanese Emperor.

== Korea ==
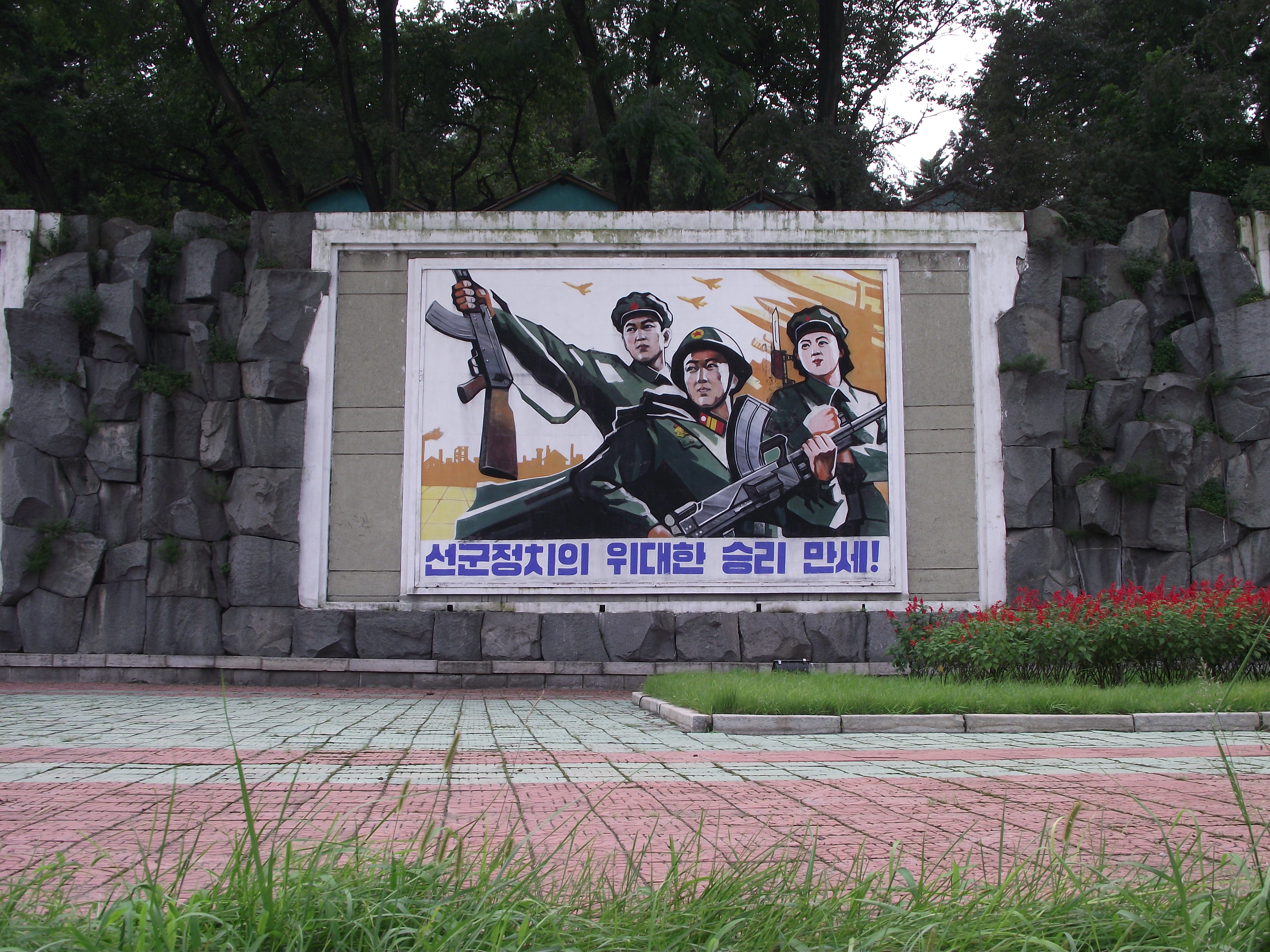
North Korean propaganda sign, "Long live the great victory of Songun politics!"

The same term is pronounced manse (Korean: 만세; Hanja: 萬歲) in Korean. In Silla, it was used as a casual exclamation. It was a part of the era name of Taebong, one of the Later Three Kingdoms declared by the king Gung Ye in 911. During Joseon, Koreans used cheonse (Korean: 천세; Hanja: 千歲, "one thousand years") in deference to the Chinese emperor's ten thousand years.

In the 20th century, various protests against Japanese occupation used the term in their names, including a pro-independence newspaper established in 1906, the March 1st Movement of 1919, and the June 10th Movement of 1926.

In North Korea, manse was used to wish long life for both Kim Jong Il and Kim Jong Un, and for the political principles of their predecessor, Kim Il Sung. Today, the word is usually chanted whenever Kim Jong Un appeared in front of the public, accompanied by clapping. Akin to the "banzai charge" used by Japanese servicemen during the Pacific War, the Korean People's Army used Widaehan Suryŏng Kim Ilsŏng Janggun Manse! (위대한 수령 김일성장군 만세; 偉大한 首領 金日成將軍 萬歲; "Long live the Great Leader, General Kim Il-sung") as a charge mantra during the Korean War.

It is also used as a casual proclamation, commonly used as the English equivalent of "Victory."

== Vietnam ==
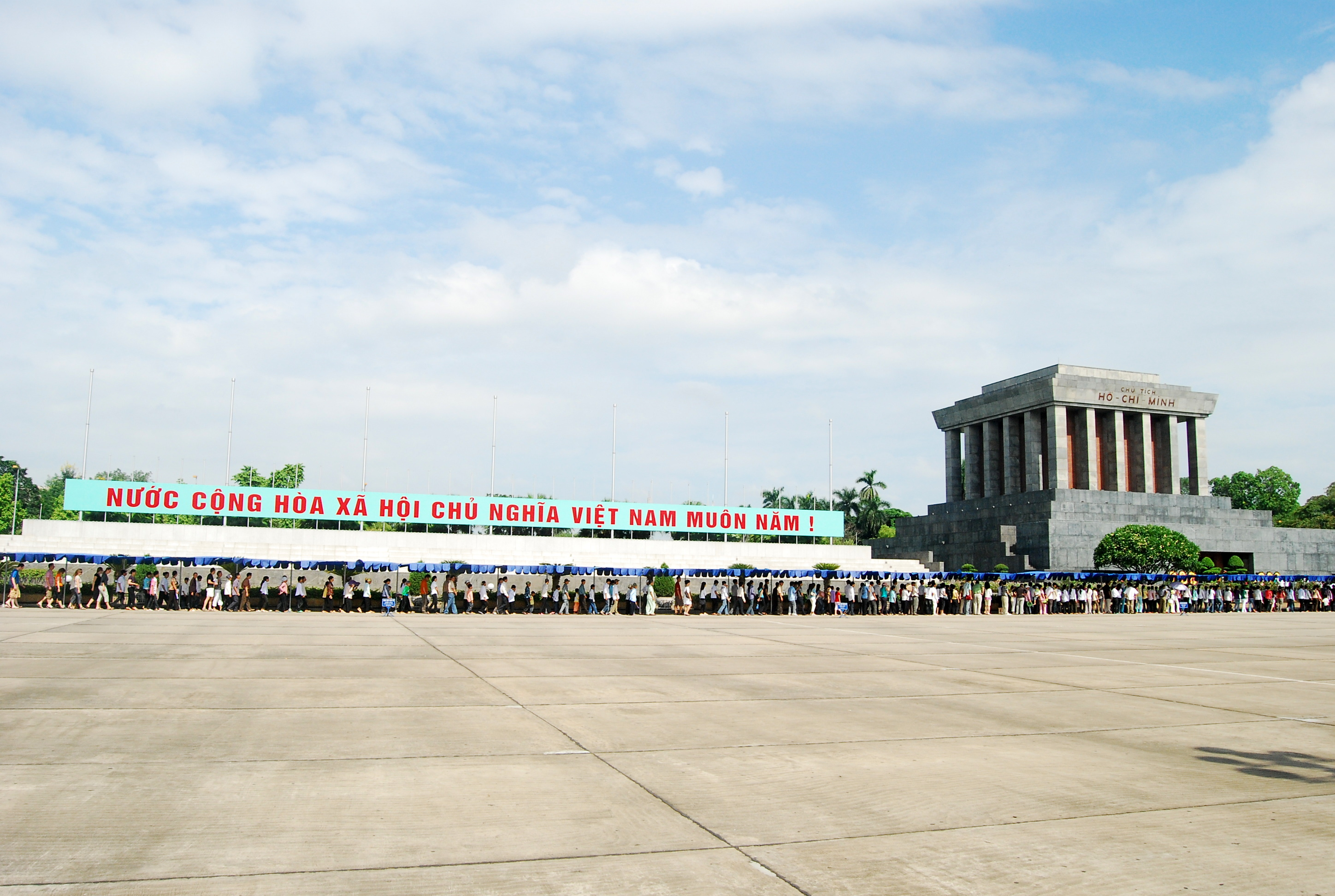
A banner at the Ho Chi Minh Mausoleum proclaiming "Ten thousand years to the Socialist Republic of Vietnam!"

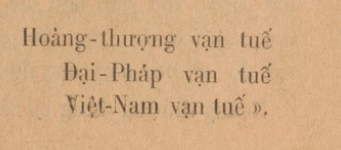
A passage from 12 ngày của Ðức Bảo-Ðại tại Bắc-Kỳ showing an instance where the people shouted: "Hoàng-thượng vạn tuế, Đại-Pháp vạn tuế, Việt-Nam vạn tuế" (Long live the Emperor, Long live Great France, Long live Vietnam) to Emperor Bảo Đại.

In Vietnamese, "vạn tuế" is the phrase cognate to the Chinese wàn suì and is the Sino-Vietnamese reading of chữ Hán: 萬歲. However, this word is rarely used in the modern language, appearing instead only in Hán văn and pre-1945 related contexts (such as in "vạn tuế, vạn tuế, vạn vạn tuế"—compare to the Chinese usage, above). In other situations, "muôn năm" is used instead, and is frequently heard in communist slogans, such as "Hồ Chủ tịch Muôn năm!" (Long live President Hồ) and "Đảng Cộng sản Việt Nam Quang vinh Muôn năm!" (Long live the Glorious Communist Party of Vietnam).

Muôn is the Old Sino-Vietnamese reading of the chữ Hán 萬 (Sino-Vietnamese reading: vạn).

Tuổi is the Old Sino-Vietnamese reading of the chữ Hán 歲 (Sino-Vietnamese reading: tuế; largely means age in modern Vietnamese context). It is derived from the pronunciation of this character in Middle Chinese.

Năm is a native Vietnamese word that inherited from the Proto-Mon-Khmer language (cognates with Khmer ឆ្នាំ and Mon သၞာံ).

There are many ways to write the words muôn tuổi, muôn năm in chữ Nôm, for example:

- muôn tuổi: 萬歲, 𨷈𢆫, 𨷈歲, 𲈦歲, 門𢆫, etc.
- muôn năm: 萬年, 𨷈𢆥, 㥃[⿰南林], 門南, etc.

== See also ==
- In saecula saeculorum
- Joy Bangla a slogan and war cry used in Bangladesh and India's West Bengal, Tripura, Barak Valley, and Manbhum District to indicate nationalism towards the geopolitical, cultural, and historical region of Bengal and Bangamata.
- Polychronion Orthodox Chant with similar meaning, sung to the Orthodox Authorities
- The king is dead, long live the king!, a traditional European saying, used to wish for long life of the monarch, said when a new king ascends to the throne
- Hindustan Zindabad, used by Indians to express victory or patriotism
- Sto lat, a similar Polish phrase and song meaning "one hundred years"
- Mabuhay, a traditional Philippine cheer meaning "May you live long!"
- Oorah
- Vive, viva, and vivat
