= Hindustan Zindabad =

Indian patriotic slogan

Hindustan Zindabad (Hindi: हिन्दुस्तान ज़िन्दाबाद, Urdu: ہندوستان زِندہ باد literally Long live Hindustan), or Hindostan Zindabad, is an originally Persian phrase and battle cry most commonly used in the Republic of India in speeches and communications pertaining to or referring to patriotism towards India, and has been used since the British Raj in the colonial India. It translates to "Long Live India". It is a nationalistic slogan, and has been used in nationalist protests such as radical peasant movements in post-colonial India. Another variation of the slogan is Jai Hind. Such slogans are common while cheering the Indian team in cricket matches.

== Etymology ==
In contemporary usage, the word Hindustan generally refers to the modern country of India since 1947. It is conventionally believed to be derived from the Old Persian word Hindu, which in turn is derived from Sindhu, the Sanskrit name for the Indus River. Old Persian refers to the people living beyond the Indus as Hinduš. This combined with the Avestan suffix -stān (cognate to Sanskrit "sthān", both meaning "place") results in Hindustan, as the land on the other side (from Persia) of the Indus.

Zindabad (may [idea, person, country] live forever) is a typical Urdu and Persian suffix that is placed after a person or a country name. It is used to express victory, patriotism or as a prayer.

== Use in episodes of violence ==
The slogan Hindustan Zindabad, and its counterpart, Pakistan Zindabad, were used during the partition of India in episodes of sexual violence against women: the slogans were often tattooed on the bodies of victims of collective rapes.

== In popular culture ==
The slogan's popular usage in recent times is likely to be credited to the film Gadar: Ek Prem Katha. The film tells the story of a Sikh man named Tara Singh (Sunny Deol), who falls in love with a Muslim woman named Sakina Ali (Ameesha Patel) during partition of India. However, Sakina's father disapproved of the marriage, primarily due to religious and national differences, but allowed the marriage to continue under the condition that Singh converts to Islam and shouts‌ हिन्दुस्तान मुर्दाबाद Hindustan Murdabad (death to India) in full view of hundreds of witnesses in Pakistan; instead of following the latter, Singh defiantly proclaims Hindustan Zindabad and then uproots a hand pump and kills a few locals belonging to an attacking mob enraged from his remarks.

== See also ==
- Bharat Mata Ki Jai
- Jai Hind
- Indian Nationalism
- Inquilab Zindabad
- Vive, Viva
- Bangladesh Zindabad
- Pakistan Zindabad
- Joy Bangla
