= Hafeez Jalandhari =

Pakistani poet (1900–1982)

Abul Asar Hafeez Jalandhari حفیظ جالندھری PP HI
- Born: Muhammad Abdul Hafeez; 14 January 1900; Jalandhar, Punjab, British India (present-day Punjab, India)
- Died: 21 December 1982 (aged 82); Lahore, Punjab, Pakistan
- Education: Early education in Jalandhar but due to family issues he could not complete his education.
- Occupation: Poet
- Spouse(s): Zeenat Begum; Anela; Khurshid Begum
- Parent: Shams-ud-Din (father)
- Writing career
- Pen name: Abu Al-Asar
- Genres: Ghazal; Nazm and Writer
- Notable works: National Anthem of Pakistan; Shahnama-e-Islam; Anthem of Azad Kashmir
- Notable awards: Pride of Performance Award in 1958; Hilal-e-Imtiaz (Crescent of Excellence) Award

Abul Asar Hafeez Jalandhari PP HI (Urdu: ابو الاثر حفیظ جالندھری; 14 January 1900 – 21 December 1982) was a Pakistani poet who wrote the lyrics for the National Anthem of Pakistan and the Anthem of Azad Kashmir.

He wrote in Urdu and Persian languages and is widely celebrated throughout Pakistan.

== Early life ==
Hafeez Jalandhari was born in Jalandhar, Punjab, British India on 14 January 1900 into a Punjabi Muslim family. His father, Shams-ud-Din, was a Hafiz-e-Qur'an. Jalandhari initially studied in a mosque school and later joined a conventional local school in Jalandhar. He only received formal education until the seventh grade, the reason being that he hated mathematics and only liked learning the Urdu language. He was an eager reader and worked very hard to teach himself. He had a natural liking for poetry and became a disciple of Maulana Ghulam Qadir Bilgrami, a Persian language poet. Hafeez promoted the cause of creation of Pakistan and became an active member of the Pakistan Movement.

After the partition of India in 1947, Jalandhari migrated to Lahore in the new state of Pakistan.

== Literary career ==
From 1922 to 1929, Jalandhari remained the editor of a few monthly magazines, namely: Nonehal, Hazar Dastaan, Teehzeeb-e-Niswan, and Makhzin. His first collection of poems Nagma-e-Zar was published in 1935. After World War II, he worked as the director of the Song Publicity Department. During this time he also wrote several songs.

Jalandhari participated in the Pakistan Movement and used his writings to inspire people for the cause of Pakistan. In early 1948, he joined the forces for the freedom of Kashmir and got wounded. Jalandhari wrote the Kashmiri Anthem, "Watan Hamara Azad Kashmir". He wrote many patriotic songs during the Indo-Pakistani War of 1965.

Jalandhari served as 'Director General of morals' in Pakistan Armed Forces, and then in a very prominent position as an adviser to the President, Field Marshal Mohammad Ayub Khan and also a Director of Writers Guild of Pakistan.

Jalandhari's work of poetry, Shahnama-e-Islam (4 volumes), gave him fame which, in the manner of Ferdowsi's Shahnameh, is a record of the history of Islam in verse.

In 1946, Jalandhari visited the Sylhet region of Bengal where he watched a mushaira performance by the Anjuman-i Taraqqi-i Urdu.

On 23 February 1949, the Government of Pakistan formed a committee to prepare Pakistan's national anthem. Out of the 723 people who competed to write the national anthem, Hafeez Jalandhari's lyrics were selected as the national anthem of Pakistan. Then this national anthem of Pakistan was composed by Ahmed Ghulamali Chagla also known as Ahmed G. Chagla. Hafeez Jalandhari was unique in Urdu poetry for the enchanting melody of his voice and lilting rhythms of his songs and lyrics. His poetry generally dealt with romantic, religious, patriotic and natural themes. His language was a fine blend of Hindi and Urdu diction, reflecting the composite culture of South Asia. One of his most famous poems 'Abhi Toh Mein Jawan Hoon' was sung by Malika Pukhraj in the 1950s with music by the Pakistani music director Master Inayat Hussain which is still popular among the public in 2018. Though considered a devout Muslim, he also wrote Krishn Kanhaiya, a poem in praise of the Hindu god Krishna.

== Marriage ==
Jalandhari married his cousin, Zeenat Begum, in 1917, at the age of 17. They had seven children, all girls. In 1939, he took a young English woman of Lithuanian descent, Anela, as his second wife. They had a daughter; the marriage ended in divorce. His first wife, Zeenat Begum, died in 1954. In 1955, Jalandhari married Khurshid Begum, with whom he had a daughter.

== Short stories ==
- Haft Palkar

== Books ==
- Naghma Zar (1925)
- Shahnama-i-Islam (1928–1947) in four volumes
- Soz-o-Saaz (1932)
- Talkhaba-i-Shireen (1947)
- Chiragh-i-Sehar (1974)
- Hafeez kay Geet
- Hafeez ki Nazmein
- Chayty Nama (1982)
- Baqalam-e-Khud (his unfinished autobiography)

== Death ==
Jalandhari died in Lahore, Pakistan, on 21 December 1982 at the age of 82. Buried in Model Town, Lahore, his remains were later shifted to a tomb built by the Government of Pakistan near the Minar-e-Pakistan in Lahore, the site of the Pakistan Resolution.

== Awards and recognition ==
- For his literary and patriotic services to Pakistan, Jalandhari was awarded the Hilal-i-Imtiaz Award by the President of Pakistan.
- Pride of Performance Award in 1958 by the Government of Pakistan.

== Commemorative postage stamp ==
In 2001, Pakistan Post Office issued a commemorative postage stamp in his honor in its 'Poets of Pakistan' series.

== See also ==
- List of people on stamps of Pakistan
- Qaumi Tarana
