= Flag of Kashmir =

Flag of Kashmir may refer to:

- Flag of Azad Kashmir, a symbol of Azad Kashmir, a region under of Pakistani administration
- Flag of Jammu and Kashmir, a symbol of Jammu and Kashmir, a region under Indian administration
