= Bangladesh Zindabad =

Bangladeshi patriotic slogan

Bangladesh Zindabad (Bengali: বাংলাদেশ জিন্দাবাদ — Bānglādēsh Jindābād, transl. Long Live, Country of Bengal) is a slogan used by Bangladeshis as an expression of patriotism and often used in political speeches and cricket matches. Its use started even before the creation of Bangladesh, during the period of United Pakistan.

== Etymology ==
The slogan is a use of the standard Bengali suffix of Persian origin; Zindabad (Long Live), that is placed after a person or a country name. It is used to express victory or patriotism.

== History ==
It is said to have originated during a speech by Abdul Hamid Khan Bhashani on 23 November 1970 in Paltan Maidan, Dhaka. The speech happened only a few days after the 1970 Bhola cyclone, the deadliest natural disaster to ever be recorded in history. The Government of Pakistan was heavily criticised for its slow reactions to relief operations following the storm Bhashani and he recommended that East Pakistan should separate and become its own independent country. He ended the speech by replacing the Pakistani slogan of Pakistan Zindabad with "Purbo Pakistan Zindabad" (Long Live East Pakistan).

Throughout the Bangladesh Liberation War, Bangladesh Zindabad and Sheikh Mujib Zindabad were a common phrase used by supporters of the Bengali separatist movement in Pakistan. Following Bangladeshi independence, many were of the opinion, that Joy Bangla (Victory to Bengal) had completed its motive and that Bangladesh Zindabad, hoping for longevity, would be more of an appropriate slogan.

During the presidency of Khondaker Mostaq Ahmad in 1975, Bangladesh Zindabad was made the national slogan of Bangladesh, replacing Joy Bangla.

The slogan was also used during the presidency of Ziaur Rahman as part of his attempt to create a territorial identity for Bangladesh in contrast to the ethnolinguistic Bengali identity. It was used in particular, as a closing remark for his speeches. Rahman promoted ideas of Bangladeshi nationalism rather than Bengali nationalism, which gained support from not only a vast percentage of the Bengali population but also the ethnic minorities in the country, who were not of Bengali origin such as the Biharis and indigenous peoples in Bangladesh.

After the 7 November 1975 coup d'état, Bangladeshi citizens from "all strata of society" were known to have shouted "Bangladesh Zindabad".

== Political slogan ==
The salutation "Bangladesh Zindabad" is the official slogan of the Bangladesh Nationalist Party. The phrase "Bangladesh Zindabad" is used by the party members at the end of speeches and communications pertaining to or referring to patriotism towards Bangladesh and Ziaur Rahman.

== See also ==
- Joy Bangla
- Hindustan Zindabad
- Pakistan Zindabad
- Pakistan Zindabad (anthem), de facto national anthem of East Pakistan
- Inquilab Zindabad
