= Qaumi Taranah =

National anthem of Pakistan

Qaumī Tarānah
English: National Anthem
- قومی ترانہ
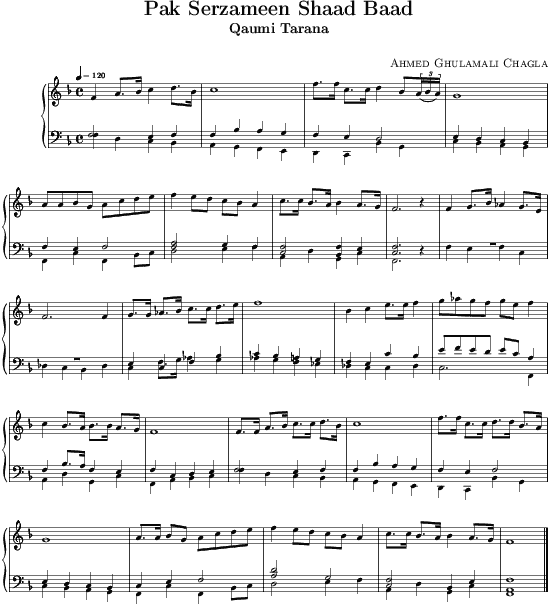
- Score of the anthem
- National anthem of Pakistan
- Also known as: پاک سرزمین شاد باد; Pāk Sarzamīn Shād Bād (English: "Blessed Be the Pure Land")
- Lyrics: Abu Al-Asar Hafeez Jalandhari, June 1952
- Music: Ahmed Ghulam Ali Chagla, 21 August 1934
- Adopted: 16 August 1954

Audio sample
- Government of Pakistan's instrumental version: file; help

2022 orchestral and choral vocal recording

c. 2003 US Navy Band instrumental version

The National Anthem of Pakistan, (Note: Urdu: پاکستان کا قومی ترانہ, romanized: Pakistan ka Qomi Taranah, pronounced [ˈpaːkɪstaːn kaˑ ˈqɔːmiː təˈɾaːnaˑ]) also known by its incipit "The Pure Land", (Note: Urdu: پاک سرزمین, romanized: Pāk Sarzamīn, pronounced [ˈpaːk ˈsəɾzəmiːn]) is the national anthem of the Islamic Republic of Pakistan. It was composed by Ahmad G. Chagla in 1949, with classical Urdu lyrics being written later by Hafeez Jalandhari in 1952. It was broadcast publicly for the first time on Radio Pakistan on 13 August 1954, sung by Jalandhari himself, and officially adopted as the national anthem of the Dominion of Pakistan on 16 August 1954 by the Ministry of Information and Broadcasting.

After the anthem's official adoption, it was recorded the same year by eleven Pakistani singers, including Ahmad Rushdi.

== History ==
In early 1948, A. R. Ghani, a Muslim from South Africa's Transvaal Province, offered two prizes of 5,000 rupees each for the poet and composer of a new national anthem for the newly independent state of Pakistan. The prizes were announced through a government press advertisement published in June 1948. In December 1948, the Government of Pakistan established the National Anthem Committee (NAC) with the task of coming up with the composition and lyrics for the official national anthem of Pakistan. The NAC was initially chaired by the Information Secretary, Sheikh Muhammad Ikram, and its members included several politicians, poets and musicians, including Abdur Rab Nishtar, Ahmad G. Chagla and Hafeez Jalandhari. The NAC encountered early difficulties in finding suitable music and lyrics.

When President Sukarno of Indonesia became the first foreign head of state to visit Pakistan on 30 January 1950, there was no Pakistani national anthem to be played. In 1950, the impending state visit of the Shah of Iran added urgency to the matter and resulted in the government of Pakistan asking the NAC to submit a state anthem without further delay. The NAC chairman, then Federal Minister for Education, Fazlur Rahman, asked several poets and composers to write lyrics but none of the submitted works were deemed suitable. The NAC also examined several tunes and eventually selected one presented by Ahmed G. Chagla and submitted it for formal approval. On 21 August 1950, the Government of Pakistan adopted Chagla's tune for the national anthem.

It was later played for Prime Minister Liaquat Ali Khan during his official visit to the United States on 3 May 1950. It was played before the NAC on 10 August 1950. Official recognition to the national anthem, however, was not given until August 1954. The NAC distributed records of the composed tune amongst prominent poets, who responded by writing and submitting several hundred songs for evaluation by the NAC. Eventually, the lyrics written by Hafeez Jalandhari were approved and the new national anthem was broadcast publicly for the first time on Radio Pakistan on 13 August 1954, sung by Hafeez Jalandhari himself. Official approval was announced by the Ministry of Information and Broadcasting on 16 August 1954.

The composer, Ahmed Ghulam Ali Chagla, died in 1953, before the new national anthem was officially adopted. In 1955, there was a performance of the national anthem involving 11 major singers of Pakistan, including Ahmad Rushdi, Kaukab Jahan, Rasheeda Begum, Najam Ara, Naseema Shaheen, Zawar Hussain, Akhtar Abbas, Ghulam Dastagir, Anwar Zaheer and Akhtar Wasi Ali.

In 2021, then Interior Minister Fawad Chaudhry announced that the official version of the national anthem would be re-recorded with better quality. The project was completed in 2022 during Shehbaz Sharif’s tenure. 155 singers, 48 musicians and 6 bandmasters participated in the re-recording, and it was released on 14 August 2022, which was the 75th Independence Day of Pakistan.

== Music ==
The national anthem is a rendering of a three-stanza composition with a tune based on eastern music but arranged in such a manner that it can be easily played by foreign bands. The music, composed by the Pakistani musician and composer Ahmad G. Chagla in 1949, reflects his background in both eastern and western music. Typically twenty-one musical instruments and thirty-eight different tones are used to play the national anthem, the duration of which is usually around 80 seconds.

== Lyrics ==
The lyrics are in classical Urdu written by Hafeez Jalandhari in 1952. No verse in the three stanzas is repeated. The lyrics being in classical Urdu have heavy Persian poetic vocabulary, and the only not common with Persian are "kā" (کا [kaˑ] 'of').

=== Urdu official ===
Original text in Nastaliq script

پاک سرزمین شاد باد
کشورِ حسین شاد باد
تُو نشانِ عزمِ عالی شان
ارضِ پاکستان!
مرکزِ یقین شاد باد

پاک سرزمین کا نظام
قُوَّتِ اُخوَّتِ عوام
قوم، ملک، سلطنت
پائندہ تابندہ باد!
شاد باد منزلِ مراد

پرچمِ ستارہ و ہِلال
رہبرِ ترقِّی و کمال
ترجمانِ ماضی، شانِ حال
جانِ استقبال!
سایۂ خدائے ذوالجلال

Roman Urdu

Pak sar zamin shaad baad
Kishwar-e-hasin shaad baad
Tu nishaan-e-azm-e-ali shaan
Arz-e-Pakistan!
Markaz-e-yaqin shaad baad

Pak sar zamin ka nizaam
Quat-e-ukhuat-e-awaam
Qaum, mulk, saltanat
Peyendah tabindah baad!
Shaad bad manzil-e-muraad

Parcham-e-sitarah-o-hilaal
Rehbar-e-taraqqi-o-kamaal
Tarjumaan-e-mazi, shaan-e-haal
Jan-e-istiqbaal!
Saya-ye-Khuda-ye-zul-jalaal

IPA transcription (Note: See Help:IPA/Hindi and Urdu and Hindustani phonology.)

[paːk səɾ.zə.miːn ʃaːd baːd ǀ]
[kɪʃ.ʋə.ɾ‿e‿hə.siːn ʃaːd baːd ǀ]
[tuː nɪ.ʃaː.n‿e‿əz.m‿e‿aː.liː‿ʃaːn]
[əɾ.z‿e‿paː.kɪs.taːn ǀ]
[məɾ.kə.z‿e‿jə.qiːn ʃaːd baːd ǁ]

[paːk səɾ.zə.miːn kaː nɪ.zaːm ǀ]
[qʊʋ.ʋə.t‿e‿ʊ.xʊʋ.ʋə.t‿e‿ə.ʋaːm ǀ]
[qɔːm ǀ mʊlk ǀ səl.tə.nət]
[paː.(j)ɪn.daː taː.bɪn.daː baːd ǀ]
[ʃaːd baːd mən.zɪ.l‿e‿mʊ.ɾaːd ǁ]

[pəɾ.t͡ʃə.m‿e‿sɪ.taː.ɾaː‿oː‿hɪ.laːl ǀ]
[rɛɦ.bə.ɾ‿e‿tə.ɾəq.qiː‿oː‿kə.maːl ǀ]
[təɾ.d͡ʒʊ.maː.n‿e‿maː.ziː ʃaː.n‿e‿haːl]
[d͡ʒaː.n‿e‿ɪs.təq.baːl ǀ]
[saː.jaː.(j)e‿xʊ.daː.(j)e‿zʊː‿l.d͡ʒə.laːl ǁ]

=== (Unofficial) English translation ===
Literal

Blessed be the sacred land,
Happy be the bounteous realm.
Thou symbol of high resolve,
O Land of Pakistan!
Blessed be the citadel of faith.

The order of this sacred land,
The might of the brotherhood of the people,
May the nation, the country, and the state,
Shine in glory everlasting!
Blessed be the goal of our ambition.

The flag of the star and crescent,
Leads the way to progress and perfection,
Interpreter of our past, glory of our present,
inspiration for our future!
Shade of God, the Glorious and Mighty.

Poetic

May the holy land, stay glad;
Beauteous realm, stay glad.
Thou, the sign of high resolve—
O Land of Pakistan!
Citadel of faith, stay glad.

Order of the holy land,
Power of fraternity of the populace;
The nation, country, and domain;
Ever luminous remain!
The cherished goal, stay glad.

Flag with the star and crescent,
The leader of progress and ascent,
Dragoman of past, the pride of present;
Soul of the future!
Shadow of the God of grandeur

== Timeline ==
- 1947 – The new state of Pakistan came into being on 14 August.
- 1949 – Music for the "Qaumī Tarānah" is composed by the Pakistani musical composer, Ahmad G. Chagla (running time: 80 seconds).
- 1950 – The anthem, without lyrics, was performed for the first time for a foreign head of state on the state visit of the Shah of Iran to Pakistan in Karachi on 1 March 1950 by a Pakistan Navy band.
- 1952 – Verses written by the Pakistani poet Hafeez Jalandhari are selected from amongst 723 entries.
- 1954 – Officially adopted as the national anthem and broadcast for the first time on Radio Pakistan on 13 August.
- 1955 – Sung by 11 Pakistani singers including Ahmad Rushdi and Shamim Bano.
- 1996 – Rendered in electric guitar for the first time by Pakistani rock band Junoon in their album Inqilaab.
- 2009 – Rendered as an acoustic instrumental for the first time by Pakistani musician Jehangir Aziz Hayat.
- 2011 – On 14 August, 5,857 people gathered in a stadium in Karachi to sing the "Qaumī Tarānah" and set a new world record for most people gathered to sing a national anthem simultaneously.
- 2012 – On 20 October, 70,000 people gathered in a stadium in Lahore to sing the "Qaumī Tarānah" and set a new world record for most people gathered to sing a national anthem simultaneously, which was certified by Guinness World Records.
- 2017 – Coke Studio released a collaborative rendition of "Qaumī Tarānah" on 4 August by the featured artistes, to celebrate the 70 years of Pakistan in its tenth season.
- 2022 – The anthem was re-recorded with modern instruments and in a higher quality, and was released on Pakistan’s 75th Independence Day.

== See also ==
- "Pākistān Zindābād"
- "Tarānah-e-Pākistān"
- "Dil Dil Pākistān"
- Flag of Pakistan
- Radio Pakistan
- State emblem of Pakistan
- Anthem of Azad Kashmir
