= Jai Hind postmark =

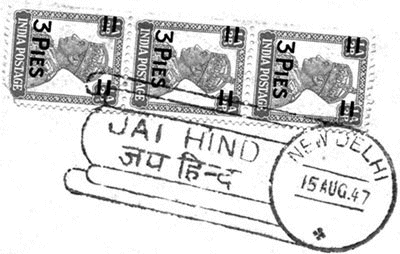
Indian commetorative post-mark of "Jai Hind"

The Jai Hind postmark was the first commemorative postmark of Independent India, and was issued on the day of independence, 15 August 1947. The post mark was withdrawn on 31 December 1947 but reintroduced at Girdikot Post Office, Jodhpur in June 1948. Most of the postmarks issued after 31 December 1947 are from this post office. The mark was withdrawn from Girdikot in April 1949, but was reused in June 1949 in Jodhpur Post Office in a new format of a rectangular box measuring 51 mm x 26 mm which reads "Jai Hind" in English and Hindi in two lines, with the date, time and place in 3rd, 4th and 5th line respectively. The time and date are flanked with 3 wavy lines on each side. It was used as a cancellation mark. It remained in use until November 1955.

The term was coined by Major Abid Hasan Safrani of the Indian National Army as a shortened version of Jai Hindustan Ki and apparently first used & popularised by Chembakaraman Pillai. The term Jai Hind was used widely by Indian National Army. The term itself was adopted by Free India as National Slogan of the country. The alphabets of the word "JAI HIND" in English and Hindi, varies from 61 mm to 67 mm, and the width varies from 11½mm to 15 mm.

== See also ==
- Azad Hind Stamps
- Indian Postal Service
- Indian National Army
- Postal marking
- Postmark
