= Tarana-e-Pakistan =

Unofficial Pakistan's first national anthem

Tarānah-e-Pākistān
English: Anthem of Pakistan
- ترانۂ پاكستان
- Former national anthem of Pakistan
- Also known as: اے سرزمین پاک; E sarzamīn-e-Pāk (English: "O Land of the Pure!")
- Lyrics: Jagannath Azad, 9 August 1947
- Adopted: 14 August 1947 (unsubstantiated claim)
- Relinquished: December 1948
- Succeeded by: قومی ترانہ

"O Land of the Pure" is claimed to be Pakistan's first national anthem, which was broadcast on the country's national radio on 14 August 1947. According to an unsubstantiated claim, it was composed by Jagannath Azad at the request of Mohammad Ali Jinnah. It was never officially adopted as Pakistan's national anthem and the current anthem was officially adopted as Pakistan's national anthem in 1954.

== History ==
=== Controversy ===
For the first time in 2004, it was claimed by an Indian journalist that the first national anthem of Pakistan was written by Jagan Nath Azad, a Hindu poet from Isakhel in Mianwali, on the personal request of Muhammad Ali Jinnah. It was alleged that Jinnah asked Azad to write the anthem on 11 August 1947 and that it was later approved by Jinnah as the official national anthem for the next year and a half. However, this claim is historically unsubstantiated, disputed and controversial. Many historians, including Safdar Mahmood and Aqeel Abbas Jafri, reject this claim and believe that Jagan Nath Azad neither met Jinnah nor wrote Pakistan's first national anthem.

== Lyrics ==
Urdu

ذرے تیرے ہیں آج ستاروں سے تابناک
روشن ہے کہکشاں سے کہیں آج تیری خاک
تندیِ حاسداں پہ ہے غالب تیرا سواک
دامن وہ سل گیا ہے جو تھا مدتوں سے چاک
اے سرزمینِ پاک

اب اپنے عزم کو ہے نیا راستہ پسند
اپنا وطن ہے آج زمانے میں سربلند
پہنچا سکے گا اسکو نہ کوئی بھی اب گزند
اپنا عَلم ہے چاند ستاروں سے بھی بلند
اب ہم کو دیکھتے ہیں عطارد ہو یا سماک
اے سرزمینِ پاک

اترا ہے امتحاں میں وطن آج کامیاب
اب حریت کی زلف نہیں محو پیچ و تاب
دولت ہے اپنے ملک کی بے حد و بے حساب
ہوں گے ہم اپنے ملک کی دولت سے فیضیاب
مغرب سے ہم کو خوف نہ مشرق سے ہم کو باک
اے سرزمینِ پاک

اپنے وطن کا آج بدلنے لگا نظام
اپنے وطن میں آج نہیں ہے کوئی غلام
اپنا وطن ہے راہ ترقی پہ تیزگام
آزاد، بامراد، جواں بخت شادکام
اب عطر بیز ہیں جو ہوائیں تھیں زہرناک
اے سرزمینِ پاک

ذرے تیرے ہیں آج ستاروں سے تابناک
روشن ہے کہکشاں سے کہیں آج تیری خاک
اے سرزمینِ پاک

Roman Urdu

Zarre tere haiñ āj sitāroñ se tābnāk
Roshan hai kahkashāñ se kahīñ āj teri khāk
Tundi-ye-hāsdān pe hai ghālib tera sivāk
Dāman vo sil gaya hai jo tha mudatoñ se cāk
E sarzamīn-e-Pāk!

Ab apne azm ko hai naya rāstah pasand
Apna vatan hai āj zamāne maiñ sarbuland
Pahonca sake ga isko nah koi bhi ab gazand
Apna alam hai cānd sitāroñ se bhi buland
Ab ham ko dekhte haiñ atārad ho ya samāk
E sarzamīn-e-Pāk!

Utra hai imtihāñ maiñ vatan āj kāmyāb
Ab hurriyat ki zulf nahīñ mahv-e-paic-o-tāb
Daulat hai apne mulk ki be had-o-be hisāb
Hoñ ge ham apne mulk ki daulat se faizyāb
Maghrib se hum ko khauf nah mashriq se hum ko bāk
E sarzamīn-e-Pāk!

Apne vatan ka āj badalne laga nizām
Apne vatan maiñ āj nahīñ hai koi ghulām
Apna vatan hai rah-e-taraqqi pe tezgām
Āzād, bāmurād javāñ bakht shādkām
Ab itr bez haiñ jo havāiñ thīñ zehrnāk
E sarzamīn-e-Pāk!

Zare tere haiñ āj sitāroñ se tābnāk
Roshan hai kahkashāñ se kahīñ āj teri khāk
E sarzamīn-e-Pāk!

English translation

The grains of thy soil are glowing today
Brighter than the stars and the galaxy
Awe-struck is the enemy by thy will-power
Open wounds are sewn; we've found a cure
O Land of the Pure!

New paths of progress, we resolve to tread
Proudly our nation stands with a high head
Our flag is aflutter above the moon and the stars
As planets look up to us be it Mercury or Mars
No harm will now come from anywhere for sure
O Land of the Pure!

The nation has tasted success at last
Now freedom struggle is a thing of the past
The wealth of our country knows no bounds
For us are its benefits and bounty all around
Of East and West, we have no fear
O Land of the Pure!

Change has become the order of the day
No one is a slave in the nation today
On the road to progress, we're swiftly going along
Independent and fortunate, happy as a song
Gloomy winds are gone, sweet freedom's in the air
O Land of the Pure!

The grains of thy soil are glowing today
Brighter than the stars and the Milky Way
O Land of the Pure!

== See also ==
- Pakistan Zindabad
- Dil Dil Pakistan
- Flag of Pakistan
- State emblem of Pakistan
- Pakistan School Song
