= Vatan Hamārā Āzād Kashmīr =

Regional anthem of Azad Kashmir

Vatan Hamārā Āzād Kaśmīr
English: Our Homeland Azad Kashmir
- وطن ہمارا آزاد کشمیر
- State anthem of Azad Kashmir
- Lyrics: Hafeez Jalandhari, 1960s

Audio sample
- Vatan Hamārā Āzād Kashmīr: file; help

"Vatan Hamārā Āzād Kaśmīr" (Urdu: وطن ہمارا آزاد کشمیر), officially known as the Anthem of Azad Jammu and Kashmir, is the regional anthem of the state of Azad Kashmir, administered by Pakistan. (Note: Azad Kashmir is a state administered by the Islamic Republic of Pakistan and the citizens of this state are citizens of Pakistan as well. The region has special status as an autonomous state within Pakistan just because of the Kashmir conflict.) The lyrics are based on a poem of the same name written in the mid-1960s by Hafeez Jalandhari, who also wrote the lyrics of the national anthem of Pakistan. Vatan Hamārā Āzād Kaśmīr was inspired during the Indo-Pakistani War of 1965.

== Lyrics ==
Urdu original

وطن ہمارا آزاد کشمیر 𝄆
𝄇 آزاد کشمیر آزاد کشمیر
باغوں اور بہاروں والا
دریاؤں کہساروں والا
آسمان ہے جس کا پرچم
پرچم چاند ستاروں والا
جنت کے نظاروں والا
جموں اور کشمیر ہمارا

وطن ہمارا آزاد کشمیر 𝄆
𝄇 آزاد کشمیر آزاد کشمیر
کوہستانوں کی آبادی
پہن چکی تاج آزادی
عزت کے پروانے جاگے
آزادی کی شمع جلادی
جاگ اٹھی ہے ساری وادی
حامی ہے اللہ تمہارا

وطن ہمارا آزاد کشمیر 𝄆
𝄇 آزاد کشمیر آزاد کشمیر
زَر کے لالچ سے او شیطاں
کیوں بیچیں ہم دین و ایمان
پاکستان کے ساتھ کھڑے ہیں
عزّت حرمت حکمِ قرآن
جان بھی قربان مال بھی قربان
مال سے پیارا جان سے پیارا

وطن ہمارا آزاد کشمیر 𝄆
𝄇 آزاد کشمیر آزاد کشمیر

Roman Urdu

Vatan hamārā āzād Kaśmīr,
Āzād Kaśmīr, āzād Kaśmīr 𝄇
Bāghoñ aur bahāroñ vālā
Daryāoñ aur Kuhsāroñ vālā
Āsmān hai jis kā parcam
Parcam cānd sitāroñ vālā
Jannat ke nazāroñ vālā
Jammuñ aur Kaśmīr hamārā

𝄆 Vatan hamārā āzād Kaśmīr,
Āzād Kaśmīr, āzād Kaśmīr 𝄇
Kohistānoñ ke ābādī
Pahan cukī tāj-e-āzādī
Izzat ke parvāne jāge
Āzādī ke śama jalādī
Jāg uṭhī hai sārī vādī
Hāmī hai Allāh tumhārā

𝄆 Vatan hamārā āzād Kaśmīr,
Āzād Kaśmīr, āzād Kaśmīr 𝄇
Zar ke lākac se o Śetān
Kyuñ bīciñ ham dīn o īmān
Pākistān ke sāth khaṛe haiñ
Izzat, hurmat, hukm-e-Qurān
Jān bhī qurbān, māl bhī qurbān
Māl se pyārā, jān se pyārā

𝄆 Vatan hamārā āzād Kaśmīr,
Āzād Kaśmīr, āzād Kaśmīr 𝄇

English translation

𝄆 Our Homeland Azad Kashmir,
Azad Kashmir, Azad Kashmir 𝄇
Made of valleys and fields
And of rivers and mountain ranges
The sky is the flag of the state
The flag of the crescent and star
Which looks like heaven
Our Jammu and Kashmir!

𝄆 Our Homeland Azad Kashmir,
Azad Kashmir, Azad Kashmir 𝄇
The population of Kohistan
The mountainous land has the crown of the state's freedom
The moth is awake to keep our honour
They lightened the candle of freedom
The whole valley is awake
Their weakness is only without Allah

𝄆 Our Homeland Azad Kashmir,
Azad Kashmir, Azad Kashmir 𝄇
Beckoned to oblivion by the great Satan
Why should we lose our faith and way of religion and life?
In the moment, we stand with our brother Pakistanis
The Quran is the protector of our honour
We give our lives for sacrifices
We’ll sacrifice our lives and goods for our cause

𝄆 Our Homeland Azad Kashmir,
Azad Kashmir, Azad Kashmir 𝄇

== See also ==
- "Qaumi Taranah"
- Flag of Azad Kashmir
