= Pakistan Zindabad =

Pakistani patriotic slogan

Pakistan Zindabad (Urdu: پاکِستان زِندہ‌باد, transl. "Long Live Pakistan") is a patriotic slogan used by Pakistanis in displays of Pakistani nationalism. The phrase became popular among the Muslims of British India after the 1933 publication of the "Pakistan Declaration" by Choudhry Rahmat Ali, who argued that the Muslim minority in British India—particularly in the Muslim-majority regions of Punjab, Afghania, Kashmir, Sindh, and Baluchistan—constituted a nation of an irrevocably distinct nature from the rest of India on "religious, social, and historical grounds" owing primarily to the issue of Hindu–Muslim unity. Ali's ideology was adopted by the All-India Muslim League as the "two-nation theory" and ultimately spurred the Pakistan Movement that led to the partition of British India. During this time, "Pakistan Zindabad" became a widely used slogan and greeting within the Muslim League, and following the creation of Pakistan, it was also used as a rallying cry by Muslims who were migrating to the newly independent state from India as well as by those who were already within Pakistan's borders. The slogan is commonly invoked by Pakistani citizens and Pakistani state institutions on national holidays, during times of armed conflict, and on other major occasions.

== Etymology ==
The slogan is a use of the standard Urdu and Persian suffix Zindabad (Long Live) that is placed after a person or a country name. It is used to express victory, patriotism or as a prayer. In literal translation, Pakistan Zindabad means "Long Live Pakistan"; it also is rendered as "Victory to Pakistan".

== History ==
The Pakistan Zindabad slogan was first raised during the Pakistan Movement. Muslims at that time often wrote the slogan on handkerchiefs or pillowcases. The slogan was equally heard as Jai Hind during a visit by a British parliamentary delegation led by Robert Richards to Delhi, after the British government decided to leave India. On 23 December 1940, the Bihar Muslim Student Federation passed a resolution to adopt Pakistan Zindabad as their national slogan at every meeting, conference or gathering. In 1941, during the days of the Pakistan Movement, Muhammad Ali Jinnah on a visit to Ootacamund was received by a crowd of Muslims chanting Pakistan Zindabad; among them was a young boy of about 10 years age, who was scantily clothed. Jinnah called him and asked, "You were shouting Pakistan Zindabad, what do you know about Pakistan?" The boy replied, "I do not know very much about Pakistan. I only know that Pakistan means Muslim rule where many Muslims live, and Hindu rule where Hindus live," to which Jinnah observed that his message had reached the people and remarked that now the struggle for Pakistan was unstoppable.

During the fight for an independent Pakistan the cry of Pakistan Zindabad was raised by the locals to welcome the refugees coming to Pakistan. The refugees also raised the cry in jubilation when they crossed the border. The slogans of Pakistan Zindabad and its counterpart, Hindustan Zindabad, notably found negative usage in communal riots associated with the fight for independence.

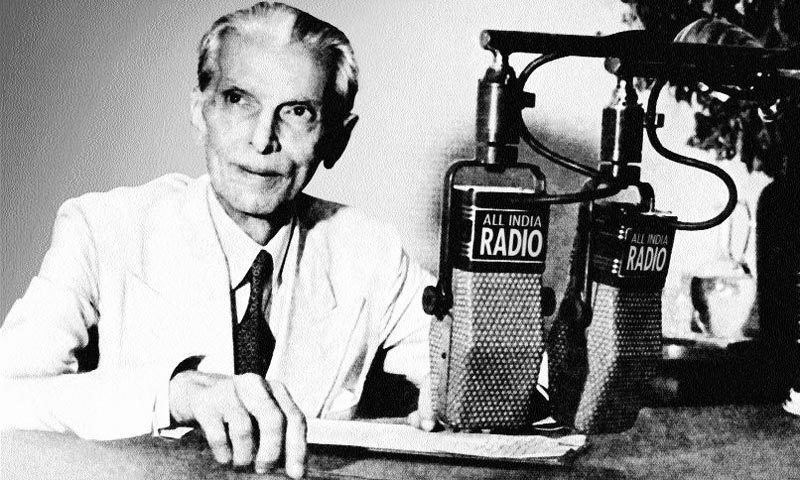
Jinnah announcing the creation of Pakistan over All India Radio on 3 June 1947.

On 3 June 1947, after an agreement for the Partition, the viceroy and the community leaders addressed the public on the radio. Jinnah ended his speech with Pakistan Zindabad!. Some listeners misunderstood his accented Urdu as the much informal "Pakistan's in the bag!". On 14 August 1947, Muhammad Ali Jinnah's motorcade was welcomed by shouts of Pakistan Zindabad, Quaid-e-Azam Zindabad and flower petals all along his way from the Governor General's residence to the Constituent Assembly building and back, where he attended the Proclamation of Independence and a hoisting ceremony of the Pakistan flag.

== Battle cry ==
In 1947, during the First Kashmir War, an outpost of the Jammu and Kashmir State force that were under the operational control of Indian Army reported cries of Pakistan Zindabad coming from Haji Pir Pass. Assuming that the pass had been invaded and occupied by Pakistanis, the Jammu and Kashmir State forces withdrew from the area and burned a strategically important bridge. They later discovered that it was a false alarm; the men were friendly forces of the Indian Army occupying the pass, who had been cut off from Poonch after the bridge was destroyed.

== Notable usage ==
=== Political ===
The Saudi King Abdullah Bin Abdul Aziz in a meeting with Chief of Army Staff Ashfaq Pervez Kayani repeatedly raised the slogan to show his friendship with Pakistan, during his visit to the country in 2009.

==== Use in India ====
On 6 July 1948, the Indian Police raided a brass merchant's shop in Moradabad, after being informed that the shop had utensils with "Pakistan Zindabad" markings on them. During the Muharram Processions in 1956, following communal discord Muslim youths raised the slogan; later in the same year it was heard during a procession organised by students of the Aligarh Muslim University, in protest against a book Religious Leaders published by Bharatiya Vidya Bhavan; however, raising of any anti-nationalism slogan was denied by Maulana Abul Kalam Azad in the Indian parliament.

The slogan has also been raised in Indian-administered Kashmir continuously.). In 1985, a Kashmiri was detained by the local police on a number of charges including raising of the slogan "Pakistan Zindabad", which was called an anti-national and provocative slogan. On 13 October 1983, during a limited over cricket match between West Indies and India at Sher-i-Kashmir Stadium, Srinagar, spectators, including a group of spectators consisting of members of the Jamait-Tuleba, the student wing of the Jamaat-e-Islami, cheered India's defeat with cries of Pakistan Zindabad.

=== National days ===
- Independence Day slogans – closely related to independence. The slogan is used in speeches and rallies carried out on this day across the world, where Pakistanis celebrate the day.

=== Sports ===
- Pakistani cricket matches. The slogan is used during Pakistan's cricket matches to support the team and also in jubilation if the team wins, especially big tournaments; historical examples include the 1992 Cricket World Cup and the 2009 ICC World Twenty20.

=== Media ===
- Pakistan Zindabad (anthem) – de facto national anthem of East Pakistan.
- TV and radio shows, including a programme Tariq Aziz show on PTV and on Radio Pakistan.
- A documentary named Pakistan Zindabad was aired on Sveriges Television in 2007, documenting the 60 year history of Pakistan.
- A song made by ISPR, Pakistan Zindabad was uploaded on 23 March 2019 on YouTube officially.
- A song made by ISPR, Pakistan Zindabad was uploaded on 21 February 2018 on you-tube officially.
- ISPR's official youtube channel has been uploading various songs and documentaries depicting "Pakistan Zindabad" theme.

== See also ==
- Pakistani nationalism
- Pakistan khappay, the Sindhi equivalent
- Hindustan Zindabad
- Bangladesh Zindabad
