= Zindagi =

Zindagi is a word of Persian origin, which means "life". It may refer to:

== Film ==
- Zindagi (1940 film), a Bollywood film directed by P. C. Barua
- Zindagi (1964 film), a Bollywood film directed by Ramanand Sagar
- Zindagi (1976 film), a Bollywood film directed by Ravi Tandon
- Zindagi (1978 film), a Pakistaní Urdu-language film
- Zindagi Zindagi, a 1972 Bollywood film directed by Tapan Sinha

== Literature ==
- Zindagi (novel), an Urdu novel by Chaudhry Afzal Haq

== Music ==
- Zindagi, a 1995 soundtrack album by Shehzad Roy
- Zindagi (album), a 2007 album by Zubeen Garg
- Zindagi (Himesh Reshammiya album), an album by Himesh Reshammiya
- "Zindagi", a 2020 song by CarryMinati

== Television ==
- ARY Zindagi, a Pakistani entertainment television channel
- Zindagi (TV channel), an Indian entertainment television channel

== See also ==
- Zinda (disambiguation)
- Zindagani, 1986 Indian film
