= Jai Maharashtra (slogan) =

Indian slogan used to express regional pride in Maharashtra

Jai Maharashtra (Marathi: जय महाराष्ट्र, pronounced [dʒəj məhaːɾaːʂʈɾə]; transl. "Victory to Maharashtra" or "Hail Maharashtra") is a patriotic slogan widely used to express pride and unity in the Indian state of Maharashtra. The slogan is often combined with Jai Hind, Jai Maharashtra to show both national and state pride. The phrase is prominently used in political speeches, cultural events, and public expressions of Maharashtrian identity. The phrase has influenced a variety of cultural expressions, including its use in political campaigns, public art, and the media.

== Etymology ==
The term "Jai" (जय) derives from the Sanskrit word jaya, meaning "triumph," "victory," or "rejoice". "Maharashtra" refers to the Indian state. Together, "Jai Maharashtra" translates to "Victory to Maharashtra" or "Hail Maharashtra".

== Usage ==
The slogan became a symbol of Marathi unity and identity, often paired with "Jai Hind" ("Victory to India") in political discourse to balance regional and national pride. The phrase gained prominence in political and cultural contexts, frequently used by Maharashtrian leaders and citizens during Maharashtra Day celebrations (May 1) and other state functions. It is also a common closing remark in speeches by politicians, as noted in public addresses where leaders end with "Jai Hind, Jai Maharashtra."

=== Politics ===
Political leaders, particularly from party Shiv Sena, use the slogan to express Marathi pride. For instance, it is often chanted during legislative sessions or public rallies. In 2016, the slogan sparked controversy when a Maharashtra MLA was challenged to chant "Bharat Mata ki Jai" instead, highlighting tensions between regional and national slogans.

=== Public transport ===
In 2017, the Maharashtra State Road Transport Corporation (MSRTC) introduced buses with the "Jai Maharashtra" logo, flagged off from Mumbai to Belgaum. This move, led by Transport Minister Diwakar Raote, was a response to a Karnataka minister's objection to the slogan, underscoring its role in regional identity politics. The decision led to a sedition case in Karnataka against activists welcoming the buses, reflecting interstate sensitivities.

=== Parliamentary oaths ===
In 2024, several Maharashtra MPs, including those from the Congress and BJP, concluded their Lok Sabha oaths with "Jai Maharashtra," alongside other slogans like "Jai Hind" and "Jai Bhim".

== Controversies ==
In 2017, Karnataka's Urban Development Minister R. Roshan Baig sparked controversy by stating that chanting "Jai Maharashtra" in Karnataka could lead to the loss of official posts. This prompted Maharashtra Chief Minister Devendra Fadnavis to condemn the statement, and the MSRTC's decision to emblazon the slogan on buses was seen as a defiant response.

In 2022, Swarajya Sanghatana activists in Nashik protested at a Karnataka Bank branch over the Maharashtra-Karnataka border dispute. They painted the signboard with black paint, wrote "Jai Maharashtra" on the shutters, and chanted anti-Karnataka slogans. Clad in black with saffron flags, they reacted to attacks on Maharashtra vehicles in Karnataka. Karan Gaiker threatened to block Karnataka vehicles and businesses if the state government didn't act.

In January 2025, activists in Belagavi, Karnataka, protested the use of "Jai Maharashtra" by Maharashtra PWD Minister Shivendra Raje Bhosale during an event. Protesters claimed the slogan was politically provocative in the context of the Maharashtra-Karnataka border disputes, highlighting the continuing tensions between the two states.

== See also ==
- Jai Maharashtra (TV channel)
- Jai Maharashtra Dhaba Bhatinda
- Jai Jai Maharashtra Majha
