= Ahmed Ghulam Ali Chagla =

Pakistani composer

Ahmed Ghulam Ali Chagla احمد غلام علی چھاگلہ

Background information
- Born: 31 May 1902; Karachi, British India
- Origin: Karachi, Pakistan
- Died: 5 February 1953 (aged 50) Karachi, Pakistan
- Genres: Modern classical
- Occupations: Musician, writer
- Years active: 1922–1953

Ahmed Ghulam Ali Chagla (Urdu: احمد غلام علی چھاگلہ; 31 May 1902 – 5 February 1953) was a Pakistani musical composer who famously composed the music for the national anthem of Pakistan in 1949. A scholar and writer, he was also an active member of the Theosophical Society.

== Early life ==
Chagla was born into a prominent Khoja Ismaili family in Karachi. His father, Ghulam Ali Chagla, was the third elected president of the municipality of Karachi, serving from 1921 to 1922. Ahmed Chagla attended the Sindh Madrassat-ul-Islam in Karachi and took lessons in classical Indian music in 1910 and western musical composition in 1914.

Chagla became interested in the study of the theory of music (both eastern and western). In 1922, he began studying eastern and western systems of music under the famous art critic James Cousins. He was particularly interested in points of contact between the two systems. Chagla undertook several journeys to gain an insight of various eastern systems of music. In 1923, he travelled overland from Karachi to Iraq, via Balochistan and northern Iran (including the Caspian Sea, Teheran, Tabriz and Kermanshah). After touring Iraq, he returned to Karachi by way of Basra. In 1928 he qualified from Trinity College of Music in London.

In 1929, Chagla undertook an overland journey from Europe to Karachi to study how far west the influence of eastern music extended. Amongst the countries he visited were Germany, Czechoslovakia, Hungary, Turkey, Syria, Palestine and Iraq. Chagla gained considerable practical experience from opera houses and symphony orchestras along the way. In addition to classical music, Chagla became proficient in orchestral, operatic classical composing and conducting of western music. This journey was followed by two more visits to Europe in 1935 and 1938.

== Later life ==
After the 1935 trip, Chagla moved from Karachi to Bombay for several years while studying the foundations of Indian music in collaboration with other scholars. From 1947 onwards, he wrote a series of articles on the music, art and culture of the countries he had visited during his travels.

In 1948, Chagla was appointed as a member of the National Anthem Committee (NAC) of Pakistan, tasked with creating the national anthem of Pakistan. The impending state visit to Pakistan by the Shah of Iran in 1950 created an impetus for a national anthem to be ready with or without lyrics. The NAC examined several different tunes and selected a tune presented by Chagla which was submitted for formal approval. Chagla then produced the musical composition in collaboration with other committee members including Radio Pakistan's first director-general Zulfiqar Ali Bukhari and musician Nihal Abdullah and assisted by the Pakistan Navy band.

In addition to being a musical composer and historian, Chagla was also an author, journalist, and writer, with most of his articles written prior to the independence of Pakistan in 1947. His works included a series of articles on classical Urdu poets such as Mirza Ghalib and Allama Iqbal and an article on the Sindhi poet Shah Abdul Latif Bhittai, which appeared in the Illustrated Weekly of India in December 1937. He also composed music for a number of Urdu, Gujarati, Sindhi and English plays, and composed music on eastern and western instruments for various films.

Chagla also authored several articles on different subjects titled "Some Aspects of Iqbal's Thought", "Cultural Expression in Fine Arts and in Music", "Pakistan - The Crucible of Cultures", "Music of Pakistan", and "Muslim Contribution to Indo-Pakistan Music."

== Death ==
Chagla died on 5 February 1953 in Karachi, before the national anthem was officially adopted by the Government of Pakistan in August 1954.

== Awards ==
Chagla's contribution to the national anthem was recognised in 1996 when he was posthumously awarded the Pride of Performance award by the President of Pakistan on the occasion of "Pakistan Day" on 23 March 1997.

In 2023, he was awarded the Nishan-i-Imtiaz by the President of Pakistan.

== Writings ==
- K̲h̲ūnī, Hyderabad : Ṭāgor Ḍrāmeṭik Klub, 1931, 116 p. Based on a German drama.
- "The romance of Shah Latif" in Pakistan miscellany, Karachi : Pakistan Publications, 1952, vol 2.

== See also ==
- List of Pakistani musicians
- Music of Pakistan
- Qaumī Tarāna
