= Jai Hind =

Salutation used to express patriotism in India

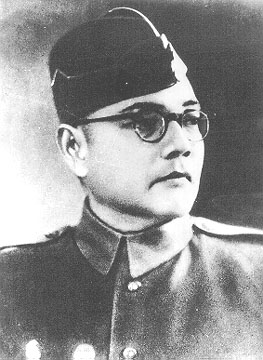
"Jai Hind" meaning "Victory to India" was popularized by Netaji Subhas Chandra Bose as a unifying slogan of courage and patriotism during India’s freedom struggle, especially through the Indian National Army (INA)

Jai Hind (Hindi: जय हिन्द, IPA: [dʒəj ɦɪnd]) is a salutation and slogan that means "Hail India", "Long live India", or literally "Victory [for] India" as originally coined by Chempakaraman Pillai. Used during India's independence movement from British rule, it emerged as a battle cry and in political speeches. The phrase reached a new level of popularity when under Netaji Subhas Chandra Bose it was adopted as an official slogan of the Indian National Army.

== Etymology ==
The word "jai" (जय jaya in Sanskrit) means "triumph, victory, cheers, bravo, rejoice". The word jaya appears in Vedic literature such as in Atharvaveda 8.50.8 and in post-Vedic literature such as the Mahabharata. "Hind" (from Persian هند hind) was the common endonym for what is today the entire Indian subcontinent prior to independence. Indians were called "Hindī" as in Iqbal's iconic Indian patriotic song Saare Jahaan Se Accha.

== History ==
Chempakaraman Pillai coined the term "Jai Hind", which was adopted as a slogan of the Indian National Army in the 1940s at the suggestion of Abid Hasan. After India's independence, it emerged as a national slogan

In 1907, Chempakaraman Pillai coined the term "Jai Hind", which was adopted as a slogan of the Indian National Army in the 1940s at the suggestion of Subhas Chandra Bose and Abid Hasan. After India's independence, it emerged as a national slogan.

According to Sumantra Bose the phrase is devoid of any religious tones. The term became popular as a slogan and greeting of the Indian National Army organised by Subhas Chandra Bose and his colleagues, particularly between 1943 and 1945. After India's independence, it emerged as a national slogan, and has been a common form of greeting the Indian people by political leaders and prime ministers such as Jawaharlal Nehru, Indira Gandhi, Rajiv Gandhi, P. V. Narasimha Rao, and others. Indira Gandhi in particular often ended her political speeches with a triple shout of "Jai Hind". Since the mid-1990s, it came to be used as a greeting among Indian Army personnel.

Since 2019, Air India requires cabin crew to end every announcement with Jai Hind.

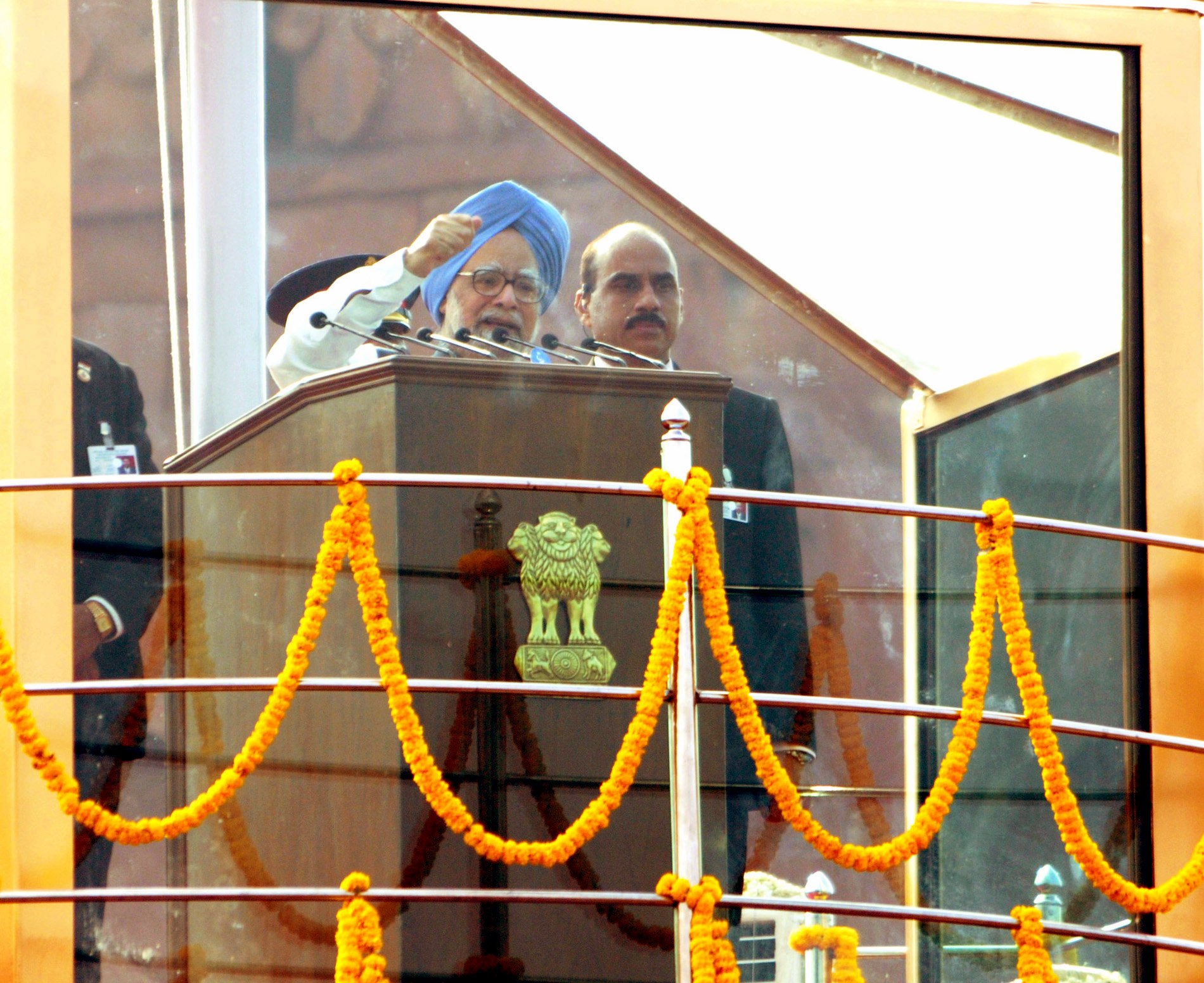
Former Prime Minister Manmohan Singh chanting "Jai Hind" from the ramparts of Red Fort, Delhi

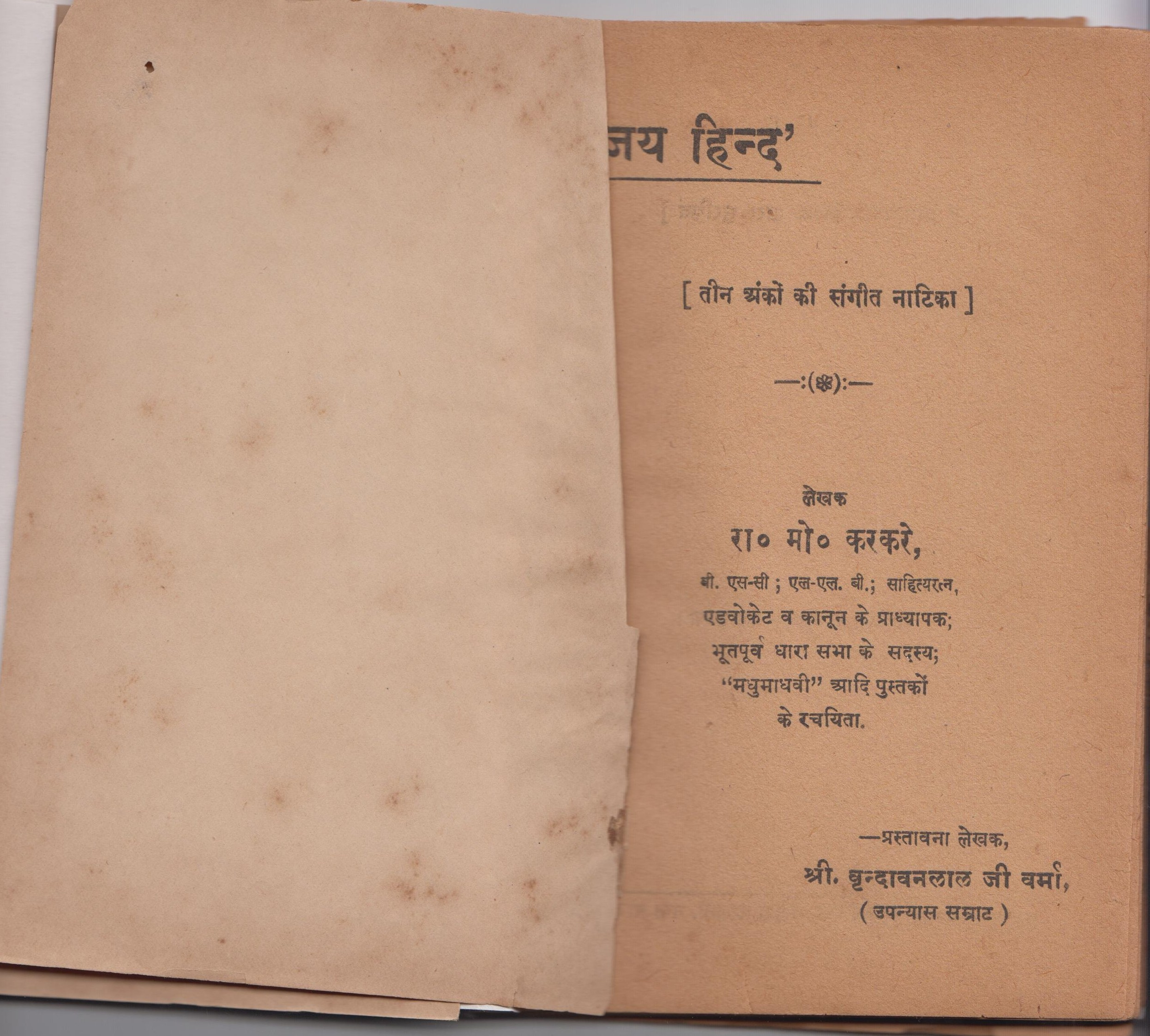
The book "Jai Hind" by Ramchandra Moreshwar Karkare.

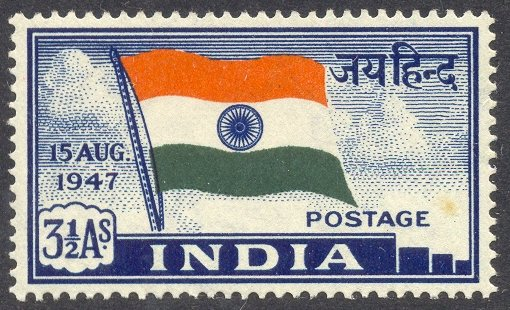
Independent India's first postage stamp.

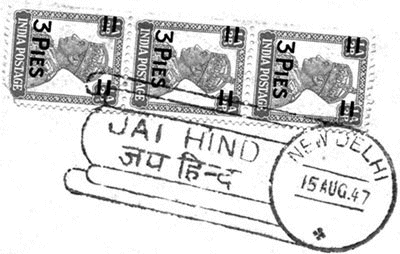
Indian commemorative Jai Hind postmark.

== In popular culture ==
A follower of Subhas Chandra Bose, Ramchandra Moreshwar Karkare, of Gwalher (Gwalior) Madhya Bharat, wrote the patriotic drama Jai Hind in March 1947, and published a book in Hindi with the same title. Later, Karkare became Congress president of Central India Province.

The Jai Hind postmark was the first commemorative postmark of Independent India. The first stamps of an independent India were issued on November 21, 1947, with Jai Hind inscribed on them, in 1.5 anna, 3.5 anna and 12 anna denominations. Along with Jai Hind, these bore images of the Lion Capital of Ashoka, the national flag, and an aircraft respectively. "जय हिन्द" is also stated on the first, Independence series of Indian stamps.

The phrase is used on All India Radio at the end of a broadcast. It occurs in the patriotic song "Aye Mere Watan Ke Logo" sung by Lata Mangeshkar in 1963. The phrase also appeared in early slogans of state-owned Air India, with a 1965 Lok Sabha debate mentioning it as part of the tagline "One Nation, One Leader, One India, Jai Hind".

Mahatma Gandhi sent a piece of crocheted, cotton lace made from yarn he spun by himself, with the central motif of Jai Hind, to Queen Elizabeth II and Prince Philip, as a gift on the occasion of their wedding in 1947.

In the Hindi-language film Pathaan (2023), Shah Rukh Khan uses the phrase Jai Hind at the end of his fight with the villain played by John Abraham.

== Other uses ==
The phrase has also given its name to

- Media
  - Movies
    - Jaihind (1994 film)), a Tamil language movie with Arjun Sarja as hero
    - Jai Hind (2012 film), Kannada language war movie
    - Jaihind 2 (2014 film), a Hindi language movie (Arjunin Jaihind 2 in Tamil) produced and directed by Arjun Sarja
  - TV
    - Jay Hind!, a comedy show
    - JaiHind TV
  - Newspaper
    - Jai Hind, a Gujarati language newspaper
- Institutes and places
  - Jai Hind College in Mumbai
  - Jai Hind metro station in Kolkata

== See also ==
- General
  - Bharat Mata
- Anthems and mottos of Mother India
  - Hindustan Zindabad, "Hail India"
  - Jai Jawan Jai Kisan, "Hail soldiers and farmers (of India)"
  - Janani Janmabhumishcha Swargadapi Gariyasi, "mother and motherland are more sacred than the heaven"
  - Jana Gana Mana, the Indian national anthem
  - Jaya Bharata Jananiya Tanujate, anthem in Kannada language for Mother India
  - Vande Mataram, hail the motherland
  - National Pledge of India
  - List of Indian state anthems
- Slogans of States of India
  - Jai Jai Garavi Gujarat
  - Jai Maharashtra
  - Jaya Jaya He Telangana
  - Joy Bangla
- Other slogans
  - Jai Bhim
