= Flag of Azad Kashmir =

Pakistani civil and state flag

Azad Kashmir
- Use: Civil and state flag
- Proportion: 2:3
- Adopted: 24 September 1975
- Design: A green background with four white stripes on the bottom half, a gold canton on the hoist, and a star and crescent on the fly
- Designed by: Abdul Haq Mirza

The flag of Azad Kashmir (Urdu: پرچمِ آزاد کشمیر), officially the state flag of Azad Jammu and Kashmir, is a civil and state flag representing the Pakistani-administered territory of Azad Kashmir. It features a green background, four horizontal white stripes alternating with green, a star and crescent on the upper fly, and a gold canton on the upper hoist.

== History ==
The flag was adopted on 24 September 1975 via the Azad Jammu and Kashmir State Flag Ordinance, passed by founding President Sardar Muhammad Ibrahim Khan. It was designed in 1948 by Abdul Haq Mirza, a mujahid working at the Rawalpindi headquarters of the Azad Kashmir rebellion, as the "Kashmir Liberation Flag". Mirza also created the formation signs of the Kashmir Liberation Force.

The Azad Kashmir flag is a key symbol of identity for Azad-Kashmiris at home and in the Azad Kashmiri diaspora. It has also been associated with the Kashmir conflict.

== Symbolism ==
According to the Azad Kashmir government, the green field represents the region's Muslim majority population; the gold canton represents the religious minorities; the white stripes represent the snow-peaked mountains of the state, and the green stripes alternating with them represent the Valley of Kashmir. The star and crescent is a national icon which also features on Pakistan's flag.

== See also ==
- Watan Hamara Azad Kashmir
- Flag of Jammu and Kashmir
- National flag of Pakistan
- List of Pakistani flags
