= Zinda =

Zinda is a Persian word meaning "live". It is also used in Assyrian Neo-Aramaic, Bengali, Hindi and Urdu and can refer to:

- Zinda Magazine, an online magazine serving the Syriac-speaking ethnic Assyrian Christian community
- Zinda (film), a 2006 Bollywood film
- Lady Blackhawk (Zinda Blake), a DC Comics character and member of The Blackhawks and Birds of Prey
- "Zinda" (song), a song from the 2013 Hindi biographical drama Bhaag Milkha Bhaag

== People ==
- Zinda Kaul (1884–1965), Kashmiri poet
- Zinda Kaboré (1920–1947), politician of Voltaic origin

== See also ==
- Zindagi (disambiguation)
