= Joy Bangla =

Slogan in Bengal region

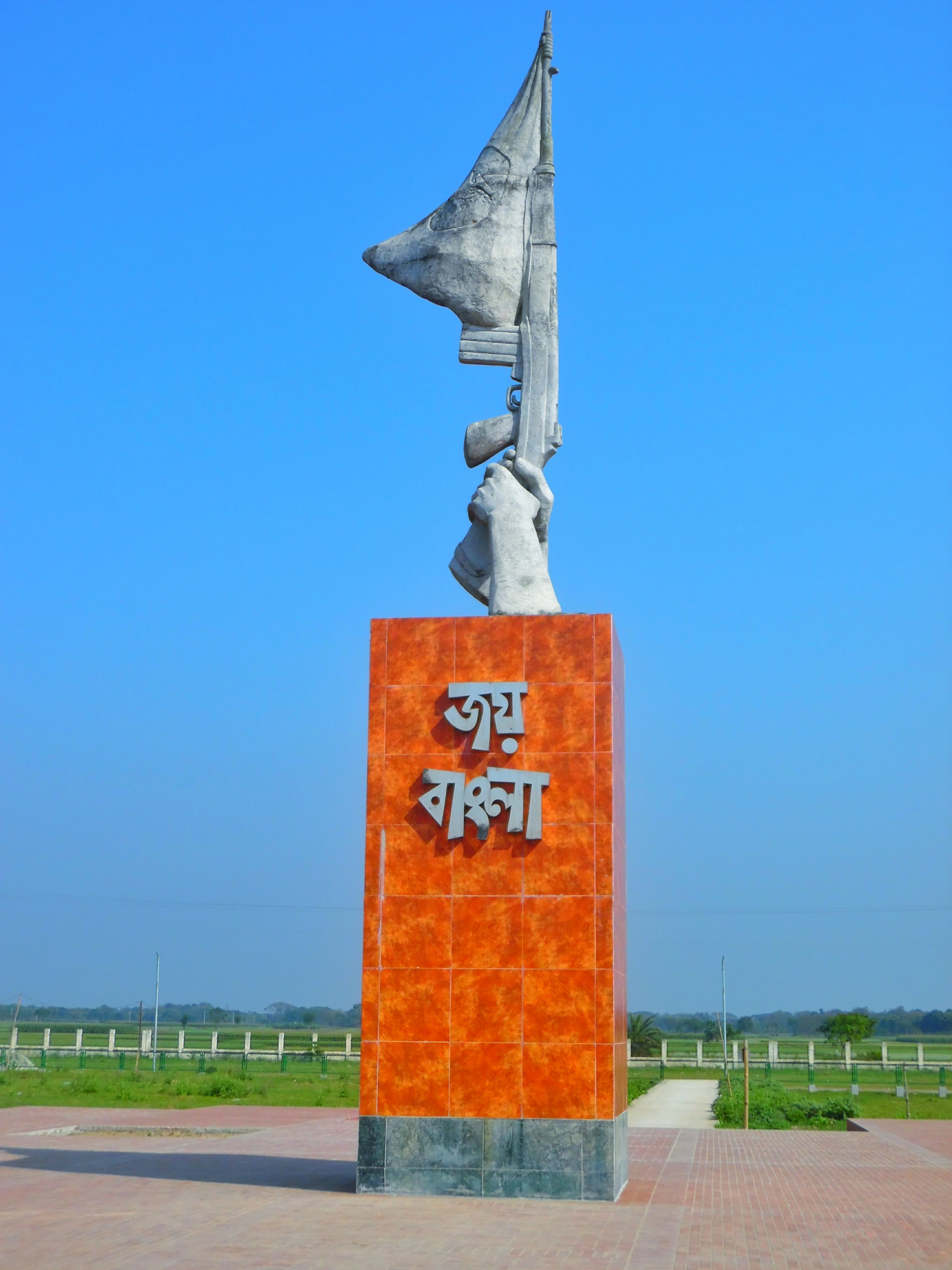
"Joy Bangla" sculpture at Mujibnagar Liberation War Memorial Complex in Meherpur

Joy Bangla (Bengali: জয় বাংলা [dʒɔj ˈbaŋla]), is a slogan and was a war cry used in Bangladesh and in the Indian state of West Bengal to indicate nationalism towards the geopolitical, cultural and historical region of Bengal and Bangamata (also known as Bangla Maa or Mother Bengal). It translates roughly to "Victory to Bengal" or "Hail Bengal".

== History ==
Purnachandra Das, British Indian school teacher and revolutionary from Madaripur, Bengal Presidency (now Bangladesh) was imprisoned in the Berhampur Jail for his involvement in the Indian independence movement. Bengali poet Kazi Nazrul Islam composed the poem "Purna-Abhinandan" from the book of poems Bhangar Gaan at the request of Kalipada Roychowdhury on the occasion of the release of Purnachandra Das from prison. Kazi Nazrul Islam first used the term "Joy Bangla" in this poem. The name of the slogan Joy Bangla comes from this poem named "Pūrṇa Abhinandan" (1922) by Kazi Nazrul Islam. The middle two lines of the fifth stanza are as follows:

Bengali original

জয় বাংলার পূর্ণচন্দ্র, জয় জয় আদি-অন্তরীণ!
জয় যুগে-যুগে-আসা-সেনাপতি, জয় প্রাণ আদি-অন্তহীন!

Romanisation of Bengali

Joy Banglar purnocondro, joy joy adi ontorin
Joy juge juge asa senapoti, joy pran adi ontohin!

English translation

Hail to Bengal's full moon, hail to the eternally enveloped,
All hail to the warriors who came here generation after generation, hail to the ceaseless eternal souls.

It appeared in the 11-point charter put forth by the Sarbadaliya Chhatra Sangram Parishad on 4 January 1969. After the release of Sheikh Mujibur Rahman, the SCSP held a rally at the Ramna Race Course ground on 22 February 1969, to honour him. When Mujib was conferred the title of Bangabandhu, cries of Joy Bangla came from all over the park.

"Joy Bangla" written in the Bengali alphabet

Joy Bangla was the slogan and war cry of the Mukti Bahini that fought for the independence of Bangladesh during the Bangladesh Liberation War in 1971. In Bangladesh Liberation War, 27 March 1971 Major Ziaur Rahman broadcast announcement of the declaration of independence on behalf of Sheikh Mujibur Rahman and he finished with "Joy Bangla".

After the assassination of Sheikh Mujibur Rahman, Khondakar Mostaq Ahmad replaced Joy Bangla with Bangladesh Zindabad.

It was proposed to recognise this slogan as the national slogan of Bangladesh.

In December 2024, Bangladesh's Supreme Court has put a hold on a High Court verdict that declared "Joy Bangla" as the country's national slogan.

== Former national slogan of Bangladesh ==
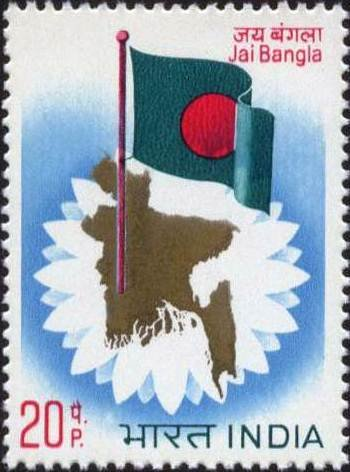
"Joy Bangla" slogan in an Indian stamp, written in Devanagari and transliterated Latin, 1973

The High Court on 4 December 2017 directed the government of Bangladesh to explain "why 'Joy Bangla' would not be declared as national slogan of the country?'"

On 10 March 2020, The High Court made the declaration naming "Joy Bangla" as the official national slogan of Bangladesh.

Justice FRM Nazmul Ahasan and Justice KM Kamrul Kader announced this after settling a rule on a writ petition filed two years ago. The High Court also added that this order will be done fulfill within next three months.

Bangladesh constitutional office-holders and all state officials will be use on all national days and in appropriate cases, at the end of their speeches in state programmes. All of educational institution teachers and students must be use the Joy Bangla motto at the end of assemblies.

On 20 February 2022 the cabinet division has decided to make Joy Bangla as the national slogan. On 2 March 2022 The government has issued a notification declaring Joy Bangla as the national slogan of Bangladesh.

According to the notification:

1. Joy Bangla will be the national slogan of Bangladesh.
2. Officials of all government offices should chant the slogan 'Joy Bangla' at the end of all national day celebrations and other functions of the state and the government.
3. Teachers and students should say the slogan 'Joy Bangla' at the end of daily gatherings and for concluding speeches at meetings and seminars in all educational institutions.

However, in December 2024, the Supreme Court of Bangladesh ruled that it will no longer be the national slogan of Bangladesh.

== Political slogan ==
=== In Bangladesh ===
The salutation "Joy Bangla" is the official slogan of the Bangladesh Awami League. The phrase "Joy Bangla, Joy Bangabandhu" is used by the party members at the end of speeches and communications pertaining to or referring to patriotism towards Bangladesh and Sheikh Mujibur Rahman.

=== In West Bengal ===
The slogan Joy Bangla is also officially used by Mamata Banerjee and by her party Trinamool Congress as part of attempt to create a territorial and ethnolinguistic identity for Bengalis in India. It is used in particular, as a closing remark for political speeches.

In West Bengal in January 2018, for the first time in India, Bengali nationalist organization "Bangla Pokkho" raised the slogan Joy Bangla.

== In popular culture ==
On 7 March 1971 Sheikh Mujibur Rahman called for independence and asked the people of Bangladesh to launch a major campaign of civil disobedience and organized armed resistance at a mass gathering of people held at the Race Course Ground in Dhaka.

The struggle now is the struggle for our emancipation; the struggle now is the struggle for our independence. Joy Bangla!..
(For more info, see: 7th March Speech of Sheikh Mujibur Rahman)

The surrender ceremony of the Pakistani military also took place at the Race Course Ground on 16 December 1971. About 93,000 Pakistani troops surrendered, making it the largest military surrender that occurred after World War 2. Lieutenant General Jagjit Singh Aurora, Joint Commander of Indian and Bangladesh Forces accepted the surrender without a word, while the crowd on the race course erupted in celebrations, shouting victory slogans, "Joy Bangla".

The phrase has also given its name to

- Joy Bangla weekly (1971), one of the two official mouthpieces of the provisional Mujibnagar government, that led the Bangladesh's independence war.
- Joy Bangla Banglar Joy, a patriotic and popular song. It was the signature tune of the Swadhin Bangla Betar Kendra.
- Joy Bangla Concert, annual benefit concert by Young Bangla.
- Joy Bangla Youth Award, the flagship Award event of Young Bangla.

== See also ==
- Jai Hind
- Bangladesh Liberation War
- Bangladesh Zindabad
- Bengali nationalism
- Pakistan Zindabad
