= Torana-i-Pakistan =

1956–1971 national anthem of East Pakistan (now Bangladesh)

English: "Long Live Pakistan"
- তারানা-ই-পাকিস্তান ترانۂ پاكستان
- National anthem of East Pakistan
- Also known as: পাকিস্তান জিন্দাবাদ (English: "Long Live Pakistan")
- Lyrics: Golam Mostofa, 1956
- Music: Nazir Ahmed, 1956
- Adopted: 23 March 1956
- Relinquished: 26 March 1971
- Succeeded by: "Amar Sonar Bangla"

"Torana-i-Pakistan", (Note: Bengali: তারানা-ই-পাকিস্তান [ˈtaɾanaˑ‿i‿ˈpa.kis.tan]) more popularly known as "Pakistan Zindabad", (Note: Bengali: পাকিস্তান জিন্দাবাদ [ˈpakistan ˈzindabad]) was an alternative national anthem sung by a small section of society (including urban elites at official functions and military personnel) of East Pakistan during its limited existence for only 23.5 years until liberation of Bangladesh in 1971. The song is in Bengali, the language of East Pakistan, (using some vocabulary that is highly Islamicized and unnatural in common speech) and was adopted from a poem by an East Pakistani poet Golam Mostofa with the name of Tarana-i-Pakistan in 1956. It was composed by Nazir Ahmed. The song was sung during school assemblies in East Pakistan by school children.

The anthem, used as the unofficial national anthem of East-Pakistan in the 1950s and 1960s, has been completely erased from the archives of the Bangladesh Television and Radio archives by the Awami League government after 1971. This was a more de facto lack of preservation rather than proactive attempt to eliminate since the song as with the actual national anthem of Pakistan was very specific in praise of the country that no longer existed on the soil of the newly liberated nation, not to mention associated with memories of a bitter colonial experience that reminded the majority of the population of the 9 month genocidal Liberation War. The low take-up of the song in the popular imagination is reflected by few being able to remember it in lyric or music. Only partial audio clips of some versions anre available online right now though full recordings are available in archival resources in Islamabad and Karachi. As a result, the song is considered to be partially lost media.

== Lyrics ==
Torana-i-Pakistan
- https://www.youtube.com/shorts/2hvDWuYiKcE?si=viPWPjLRWdrHldvu
- https://m.youtube.com/watch?si=RXFUg4-u-_uNiuhA&v=TLo4_TE5wo0&feature=youtu.be

=== Bengali original ===
Bengali script

পাকিস্তান জিন্দাবাদ, পাকিস্তান জিন্দাবাদ, পাকিস্তান জিন্দাবাদ

পুরব বাংলার শ্যামলিমায়, পঞ্চনদীর তীরে অরুণিমায
ধূসর সিন্ধুর মরু সাহারায়, ঝাণ্ডা জাগে যে আজাদ

পাকিস্তান জিন্দাবাদ, পাকিস্তান জিন্দাবাদ, পাকিস্তান জিন্দাবাদ

সীমান্তের হিম গিরির চূড়ায়, বিজয় নিশান তার আকাশে উড়ায়
ঝিলাম বিপাশা প্রতিচ্ছায়ায়, পেল আজাদীর স্বাদ

পাকিস্তান জিন্দাবাদ, পাকিস্তান জিন্দাবাদ, পাকিস্তান জিন্দাবাদ

সাম্য মৈত্রীর বন্ধন হার, তৌহীদী দীক্ষা কণ্ঠে যাহার
তিস্তা বিতস্তা আজো মােছে তার, গ্লানি দুঃখ বিষাদ

পাকিস্তান জিন্দাবাদ, পাকিস্তান জিন্দাবাদ, পাকিস্তান জিন্দাবাদ

খাইবার দ্বারে তার পতাকাবাহী, মেঘনার কূলে যত বীর সিপাহী
প্রাচ্য প্রতীচ্যের মিলন গাহি, দুনিয়া করে যে আবাদ

পাকিস্তান জিন্দাবাদ, পাকিস্তান জিন্দাবাদ, পাকিস্তান জিন্দাবাদ

Arabic script

پاکستان زندہ باد، پاکستان زندہ باد، پاکستان زندہ باد

پورب بانگلار شیملمای، پنچندیر تیر ارنمای
دھوشر سندھور مرو صحرای، جھانڈا جاگے جے آزاد

پاکستان زندہ باد، پاکستان زندہ باد، پاکستان زندہ باد

شیمانتر ہم گریر چڑاے، بجی نشان تار آکاشے اُڑاے
جھلم بپاشا پرتچّھایاے، پیلو آزادیر شاد

پاکستان زندہ باد، پاکستان زندہ باد، پاکستان زندہ باد

شامّو میتریر بندھن ہار، توحیدی دکّھا کنٹھے جاہار
تستا بتستا آجو موچھے تار، گلانی دکّھو بشاد

پاکستان زندہ باد، پاکستان زندہ باد، پاکستان زندہ باد

خیبر دارے تار پتاکاباہی، میگھنار کولے جتو بیر سپاہی
پرَچّو پرتِچّیر ملن گاہی، دنیا کرے جے آباد

پاکستان زندہ باد، پاکستان زندہ باد، پاکستان زندہ باد

Latin script

Pakistan zindabad, Pakistan zindabad, Pakistan zindabad.

Purob banglar shæmlimay, põcondir tire orunimay dhusor sindhur
Moru saharay, jhanḍa jage je azad.

Pakistan zindabad, Pakistan zindabad, Pakistan zindabad.

Shimanter him girir cuṛay, bijoy nishan tar akashe uṛay
Jhilom bipasha proticchayay, pel azadir shad.

Pakistan zindabad, Pakistan zindabad, Pakistan zindabad.

Shammo moitrir bondhon har, touhidi dikha konṭhe jahar
Tista bitosta ajo moche tar, glani dukkho bisad.

Pakistan zindabad, Pakistan zindabad, Pakistan zindabad.

Khaibar dare tar potakabahi, meghnar kule joto bir sipohi
Pracco proticcer milon gahi, duniya kore je abad.

Pakistan zindabad, Pakistan zindabad, Pakistan zindabad.

IPA transcription

[ˈpa.kis.tan ˈzin.da.bad | ˈpa.kis.tan ˈzin.da.bad | ˈpa.kis.tan ˈzin.da.bad]

[ˈpuɾob ˈbaŋ.laɾ ˈʃæm.li.mae̯ | ˈpɔn.t͡ʃon.diɾ ˈti.ɾeˑ ˈɔ.ɾu.ni.mae̯ ˈdʱu.soɾ ˈsin.dʱuɾ]
[ˈmɔ.ɾuˑ ˈsa.ɦa.ɾae̯ | ˈd͡ʒʱaɳ.ɖaˑ ˈd͡ʒa.geˑ d͡ʒeˑ ˈa.zad]

[ˈpa.kis.tan ˈzin.da.bad | ˈpa.kis.tan ˈzin.da.bad | ˈpa.kis.tan ˈzin.da.bad]

[ˈʃi.man.teɾ him ˈgi.ɾiɾ ˈt͡ʃu.ɽae̯ | ˈbi.d͡ʒɔe̯ ˈni.ʃan taɾ ˈa.ka.ʃeˑ ˈu.ɽae̯]
[ˈd͡ʒʱi.lom ˈbi.pa.ʃaˑ ˈpɾɔ.tiʔ.t͡ʃʰae̯.ae̯ | pel ˈa.za.diɾ ʃad]

[ˈpa.kis.tan ˈzin.da.bad | ˈpa.kis.tan ˈzin.da.bad | ˈpa.kis.tan ˈzin.da.bad]

[ˈʃam.moˑ ˈmɔe̯t.ɾiɾ ˈbɔn.dʱon haɾ | ˈtou̯.ɦi.diˑ ˈdi.kʰaˑ ˈkɔɳ.ʈʰeˑ ˈd͡ʒa.ɦaɾ]
[ˈtis.taˑ ˈbi.tos.taˑ ˈa.d͡ʒoˑ ˈmɔ.t͡ʃʰeˑ taɾ | ˈɡla.niˑ ˈduh.kʰoˑ ˈbi.sad]

[ˈpa.kis.tan ˈzin.da.bad | ˈpa.kis.tan ˈzin.da.bad | ˈpa.kis.tan ˈzin.da.bad]

[ˈkʰai̯.baɾ ˈda.ɾeˑ taɾ ˈpɔ.ta.ka.ba.ɦiˑ | ˈmegʱ.naɾ ˈku.leˑ ˈd͡ʒɔ.toˑ biɾ ˈsi.po.ɦiˑ]
[ˈpɾaʔ.t͡ʃoˑ ˈpɾɔ.tiʔ.t͡ʃeɾ ˈmi.lon ˈga.ɦiˑ ˈdu.ni.jaˑ ˈkɔ.ɾeˑ d͡ʒeˑ ˈa.bad]

[ˈpa.kis.tan ˈzin.da.bad | ˈpa.kis.tan ˈzin.da.bad | ˈpa.kis.tan ˈzin.da.bad]

=== English translation ===
May Pakistan live long, may Pakistan live long, may Pakistan live long
In the lush greenery of East Bengal, in the red glow of the banks of the five rivers
In the grey deserts of Sindh, the flag awakens a freedom
May Pakistan live long, may Pakistan live long, may Pakistan live long
At the peak of the Frontier's frigid mountains, it flies the symbol of victory in its skies
In the reflections of the Jhelum and the Beas, the taste of freedom has been found
May Pakistan live long, may Pakistan live long, may Pakistan live long
The binding necklace of equality and alliance, those that have monotheistic teachings in their throats
Teesta and Vitasta hitherto wipes its fatigue, sorrow and grief
May Pakistan live long, may Pakistan live long, may Pakistan live long
Its flagbearers at the Khyber Pass, valiant sepoys at the banks of the Meghna
We sing the union of the Orient and the Occident, cultivating the world
May Pakistan live long, may Pakistan live long, may Pakistan live long

== See also ==
- "Qaumi Tarānah"
- "Tarānah-e-Pākistān"

== Bibliography ==
- Ahmed, Nazir (1993). জীবনী গ্রন্থমালা [Garland of biographic texts] (in Bengali). Vol. 158. Bangla Academy. p. 113.
- Kuhinur (1964). বুলবুলে মদীনা [Nightingale of Medina] (in Bengali). p. 46.
- Bhuiyan, Sirajul Islam (1962). গাজী কালু ও চম্পাবতী [Ghazi, Kalu and Champabati] (in Bengali).
- গীতালি: সঙ্গীত জগতের একটি অমূল্য সম্পদ [A priceless treasure in the world of song] (in Bengali). মোসুমী প্রকাশনী. 1962. p. 34.
