= Inquilab Zindabad =

Hindustani phrase meaning "Long live the revolution"

Inquilab Zindabad (Hindi: इंक़िलाब ज़िंदाबाद; Bengali: ইনকিলাব জিন্দাবাদ; Urdu: اِنقلاب زِنده باد) is a Hindustani phrase, which translates to "Long live the revolution". Although originally the slogan was used by Indian independence movement activists in the British Indian Empire, today it is used in Bangladesh, India and Pakistan by civil society activists during protests as well as by politicians from various ideological backgrounds.

== History ==
This slogan was coined by the Islamic scholar, Urdu poet, Indian freedom fighter, prominent leader of Indian National Congress and one of the founders of Communist party of India, Maulana Hasrat Mohani in 1921. It was popularized by Bhagat Singh (1907–1931) during the late 1920s through his speeches and writings. It was also the official slogan of the Hindustan Socialist Republican Association, and the slogan of Communist Consolidation as well as a slogan of the All India Azad Muslim Conference. In April 1929, this slogan was raised by Bhagat Singh and his associate Batukeshwar Dutt who had shouted this after bombing the Central Legislative Assembly in Delhi. Later, for the first time in an open court, this slogan was raised in June 1929 as part of their joint statement at the High Court in Delhi. Since then, it became one of the rallying cries of the Indian independence movement, with which the phrase has been most identified. In Indian political novels chronicling the independence movement, a pro-independence sentiment is often characterized by characters shouting this slogan.

== Modern uses ==
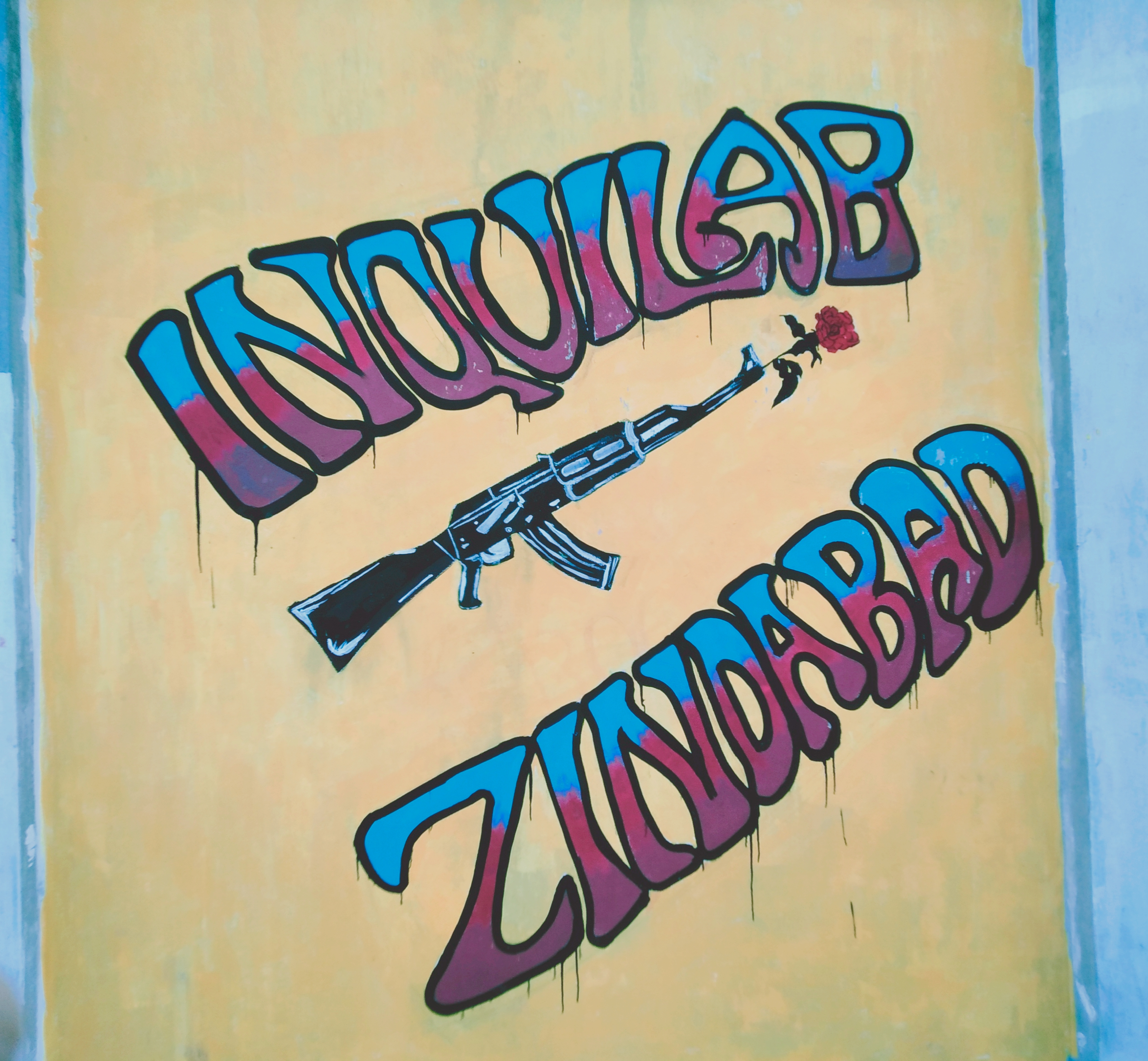
Graffiti of Inquilab Zindabad slogan from Bangladesh, drawn by the students after the July Uprising in 2024

During the July Uprising in Bangladesh in 2024, which led to the fall of the then ruling authoritarian government, the slogan was widely used. As a result, it regained significant popularity in Bangladesh and continued to be used extensively in public gatherings in the following years.

== Controversy ==
On 21 February 2026, marking Language Movement Day and International Mother Language Day, Minister for Power, Energy and Mineral Resources Iqbal Hassan Mahmood criticized the slogan "Inquilab Zindabad", claiming it was not part of the Bangla language. He said,

If the people of Bangladesh truly embraced Bangla as their mother tongue, then slogans such as "Inquilab Zindabad" could not continue. "Inquilab Zindabad" has no connection with the Bangla language, and it is the language of those who once attempted to deprive Bengalis of their right to speak their mother tongue and failure to properly understand and value Bangla had hindered the development of nationalism. Referring to younger generations, if people had reflected more deeply on the language, Gen Z would not be chanting "Inquilab", by adding that the hearing of the slogan "Inquilab Zindabad" made "heart bleed". The words such as "Inquilab Zindabad", "Inquilab Moncho" and "Azadi" were increasingly being heard in public discourse, and it is asserted that they have no connection with Bangla.

— Iqbal Hassan Mahmood

His remarks drew widespread protests and criticism from politicians and student leaders, who argued the slogan was historically linked to the July Uprising, defending it as part of the nation's political and cultural history. Bangladesh Jamaat-e-Islami opposed his comments, stating that "Inquilab Zindabad is not the exclusive slogan of any particular group but a symbol of protest against exploitation, injustice, and autocratic rule." The National Citizen Party, Hefazat-e-Islam, and other political parties also criticised his remarks.

Subsequently, many users posted "Inquilab Zindabad" on Facebook in protest, and the phrase later trended on social media.
