= Nafees Bin Zafar =

Bangladeshi software engineer (born 1978)

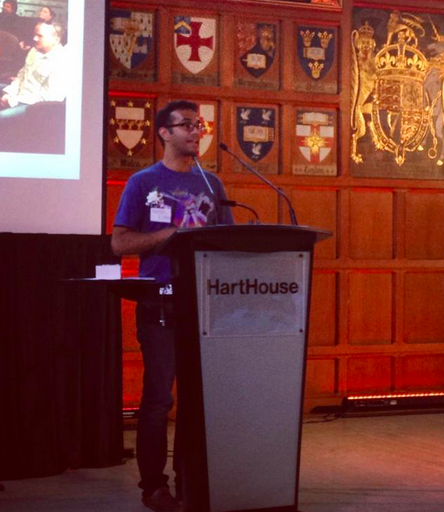
- Nafees Bin Zafar speaking at the 2014 Aspire Conference, at the University of Toronto's Hart House
- Born: October 8, 1978 (age 47); Dhaka, Bangladesh
- Education: College of Charleston
- Occupation: Software engineer
- Years active: 2000–present
- Employer: DreamWorks Animation
- Known for: First Academy Award winner Bangladeshi
- Parent(s): Zafar Bin Bashar; Nafeesa Zafar
- Relatives: Golam Mostofa (great-grandfather); Mustafa Monwar (granduncle); Farida Majid (aunt)
- Awards: Academy Scientific and Technical Award (2008, 2015)
- Website: nafees.net

Nafees Bin Zafar (born 1978) is a visual effects and computer graphics software engineer of Bangladeshi origin based in Los Angeles, United States. He is currently Principal Engineer at animation studio DreamWorks Animation. In 2008, he received an Academy Scientific and Technical Award in Scientific and Engineering Award (Academy Plaque) category for the development of the fluid simulation system at Digital Domain, becoming the first person of Bangladeshi origin to win an Academy Award in any category. He also received an Academy Scientific and Technical Award in Technical Achievement Award (Academy Certificate) category in 2015 for the separate development of two large-scale destruction simulation systems based on Bullet.

== Early life ==
Zafar was born in Dhaka, Bangladesh, and moved to Charleston, South Carolina with his family when he was 11. He studied at Dhaka Residential Model College till grade 6. He attended College of Charleston and graduated in software engineering. During that time, he studied 3D graphics using SGI computers at Virtual Reality South.

He is the son of Zafar Bin Bashar, a partner at Marcum & Kliegman, and Nafeesa Zafar, who resides in Long Island, New York. He is a great-grandson of the famous late Bangladeshi poet Golam Mostofa and grand-nephew of the Bangladeshi artist and puppeteer Mustafa Monwar.

== Career ==
In February 2008, Zafar received an Academy Scientific and Technical Award for the development of the fluid simulation system at Digital Domain, which was used in the film Pirates of the Caribbean: At World's End. He received the Scientific and Engineering Award along with his colleagues at Digital Domain, thus becoming the first person of Bangladeshi origin to win an Academy Award.

In February 2015, Zafar was again recognized by the Academy when he and his colleagues at Digital Domain received a Technical Achievement Award for their work on the Drop Destruction Toolkit, used to create visual effects in the film 2012. He is now Principal Engineer at DreamWorks Animation.

== Filmography ==
- Madagascar 3: Europe's Most Wanted (principal engineer)
- Puss in Boots (senior software engineer)
- Kung Fu Panda 2 (senior software engineer)
- Megamind (senior production engineer)
- Shrek Forever After (senior production engineer)
- Percy Jackson & the Lightning Thief (software engineer)
- The Seeker: The Dark Is Rising (visual effects: Digital Domain)
- Pirates of the Caribbean: At World's End (technical developer)
- Flags of Our Fathers (technical developer)
- Stealth (software engineer)
- The Croods (research and development principal engineer: DreamWorks Animation)

== See also ==
- DreamWorks Animation
