= Golam Mostofa (poet) =

Bengali writer and poet

- গোলাম মোস্তফা
- Born: c. 1897; Manoharpur, Bengal, British India
- Died: 13 October 1964 (aged 66–67); Dacca, East Pakistan, Pakistan
- Children: 7 (including Mustafa Monwar)
- Father: Golam Rabbani
- Relatives: Farida Majid (granddaughter); Nafees Bin Zafar (great-grandson)

Golam Mostofa (Bengali: গোলাম মোস্তফা; 1897 – 13 October 1964) was a Pakistani Bengali writer and poet.

== Early life and education ==
Qazi Golam Mostofa was born in 1897 to a Bengali family of Muslim Qazis in the village of Manoharpur in Shailkupa, Jhenaidah, then part of the Jessore District of Bengal Presidency (now in Bangladesh). His family were literature-enthusiasts proficient in Bengali, Arabic and Persian. His father, Qazi Golam Rabbani, and his grandfather, Qazi Golam Sarwar, were both folk poets. The family served as judges to the Mughal rulers, and had arrived in Manoharpur from the village of Nibekrishanpur in Pangsha, Faridpur District.

Mostofa finished his primary education in Damukdia, then spent two years studying in Fazilpur. He passed the Entrance exam in 1913 from Shailkupa High School. He passed BA from Ripon College in 1918 and BT from David Hare Training College in 1922.

== Career ==
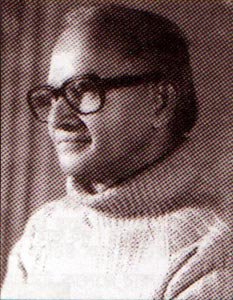
Golam Mostofa

Mostofa started teaching at Barrackpore Government High School in January 1920. Four years later, he transferred to the Calcutta Hare School and later the Calcutta Madrasa. He became the Deputy Head at the Baliganj Government Demonstration High School, eventually become the first Muslim headmaster of the school. In 1940, he moved to Bankura District School and numerous other schools, before retiring as headmaster of Faridpur Zila School in 1949.

Islamic heritage was one of his inspirations. His book Biswanabi (1942), a biography based on the life of the Islamic prophet Muhammad, earned him wide recognition.

== Works ==
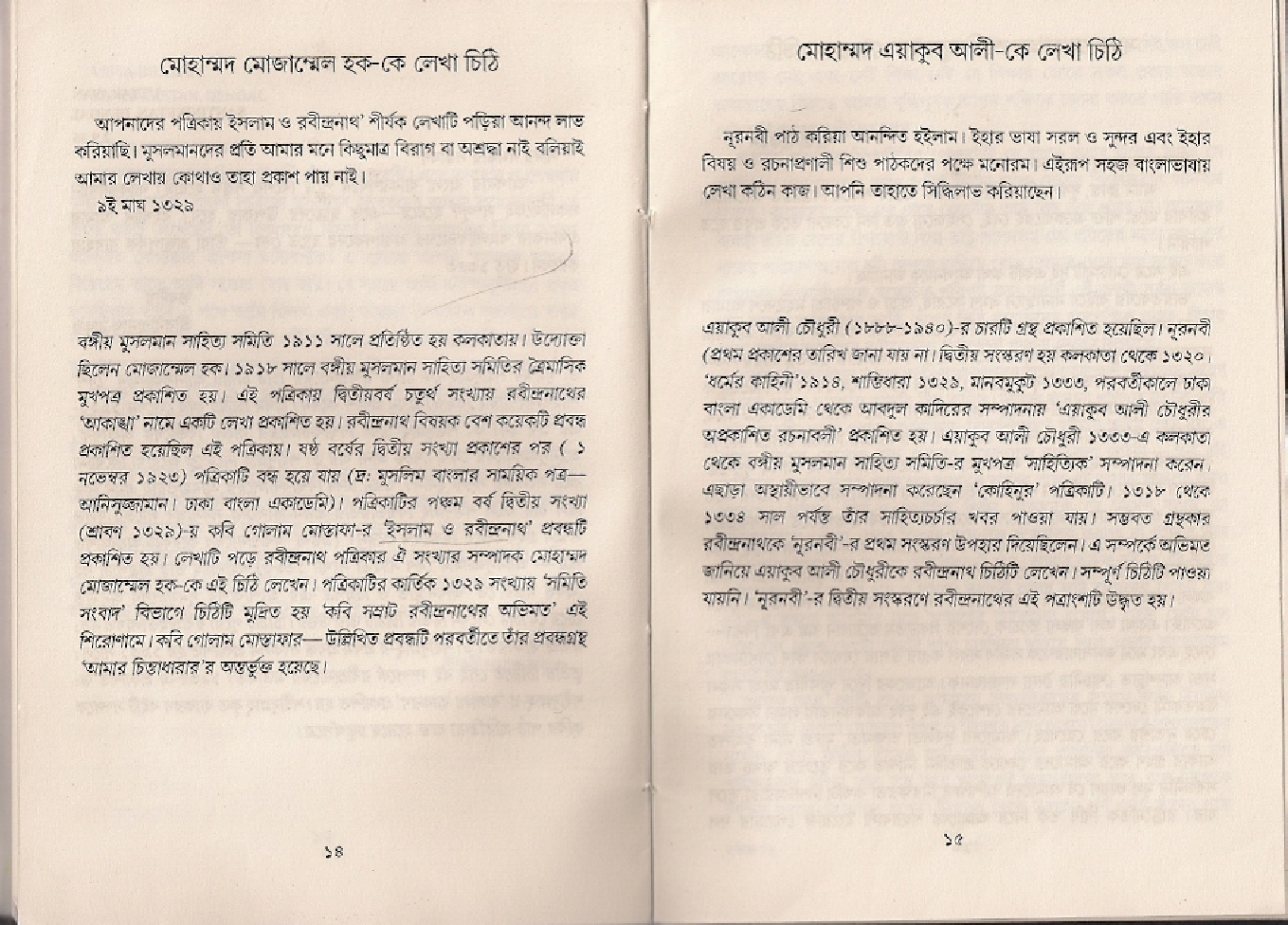
A letter sent to Mohammad Mozammel Huq of the Bengal Muslim Literary Society from Nobel laureate Rabindranath Tagore after the release of Mostofa's Islam and Rabindranath article.

Mostofa wrote his first poem, Adrianople Uddhar, in tenth grade, which got published by The Mohammadi. After that, he wrote for forty-eight years. His works included poetry, biographies, novels, articles and translations of Arabic and Urdu works.

Poetry:

- Roktorag (1924)
- Khoshroz (1929)
- Kabbo Kahini (1932)
- Sahara (1936)
- Hasnahena (1938)
- Bulbulistan (1949)
- Tarana-i-Pakistan (1956)
- Bani Adam (1958)
- Geeti Shonchalon (1968)
- Gulistan
- Prarthona
- Kishore
- Qobor
- He Khoda Doyamoy Rahmanur Rahim
- Badshah Tumi Deen O Duniyar, Nikhiler Chiro Shundor Srishti
- Amar Muhammad Rasul

Biography

- Bishwanabi (1942)

Novels

- Ruper Nesha
- Bhangabuk
- Ek Mon Ek Pran

Others

- Islam O Communism (1946)
- Islame Jehad (1947)
- Amar Chintadhara (1952)
- Maru Dulal

Translations

- Musaddas-e-Hali (1941)
- Kalam-e-Iqbal (1957)
- Shikwa O Jowab-e-Shikwa (1960)
- Al Quran (1958)
- Joy Porajoy (Ikhwan As-Safa)

== Awards ==
- Sitara-i-Imtiaz
- President Medal

== Personal life ==
Mostafa had four sons and three daughters. One of the sons, Mostafa Monowar, became a puppeteer and former director general of the state-run Bangladesh Television. Kobi Golam Mostafa's youngest son Mostafa Farooq (Pasha) was the first pianist in Bangladesh. He studied in Royal College of Music, London, England. In the year of celebration of 100-anniversary of Karol Szymanowski in Poland, the Minister of Culture and Art awarded Farooq a prestigious commemorial medal as a proof of appreciation for introducing the Polish Classical music to the nation. He came back to Bangladesh after completing his bachelor's in Music and started his profession as a Music Teacher.

Kobi Golam Mostafa is the grandfather of Syed Mainul Hossain, an architect who designed Jatiyo Smriti Soudho at Savar, and Farida Majid, a poet and academic. He is the great-grandfather of Bangladeshi software engineer and Academy Scientific and Technical Award winner Nafees Bin Zafar.

== Death and legacy ==
Mostafa died on 13 October 1964 at the age of 67, of cerebral thrombosis.

In 2014, the ancestral home of Mostafa in Jhenaidah was under threat from two land grabbers, who claimed partial ownership of the land.

Many artifacts used by Mostofa and valuable photographs drawn by his second son Mostafa Aziz, sole artist of the first pencil sketch of the poet, were found to be in a pitiable condition at the village. Though Kabi Golam Mustafa Memorial Library received a concrete building at the yard of the poet's house in 2008 implemented by the Zila Parishad, Jhenidah, at a cost of Tk 1.70 million, there are, virtually, no reading materials were found to be there. Some parental property of the poet, including his paternal land and trees are secretly being sold, according to reliable sources.
