= Syed Mainul Hossain =

Bangladeshi architect (1952–2014)

- সৈয়দ মাইনুল হোসেন
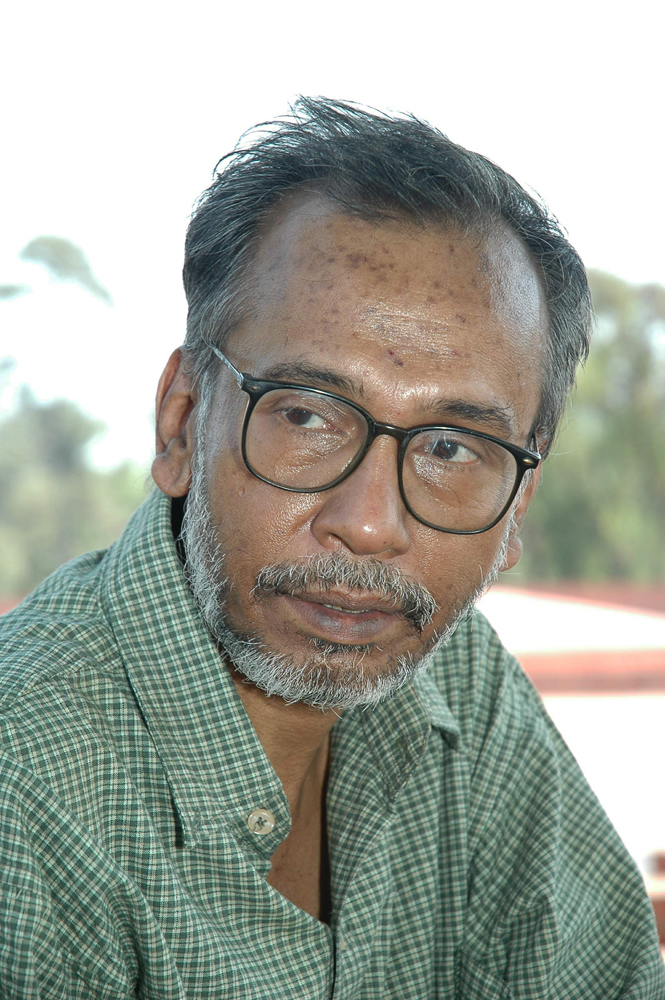
- Hossain in 2006
- Born: 17 March 1952; Dhaka, East Bengal, Dominion of Pakistan
- Died: 10 November 2014 (aged 62); Dhaka, Bangladesh
- Resting place: Martyred Intellectuals Memorial, Mirpur, Dhaka
- Education: Bangladesh University of Engineering and Technology
- Children: Syeda Tahrim Hossain; Syeda Tanjila Hossain
- Parents: Syed Mujibul Haq (father); Syeda Rashida Haq Hena (mother)
- Relatives: Maternal grandfather – Golam Mostofa, poet; Maternal uncle – Mustafa Monwar, Ekushey Padak-winning artist; Nephew – Nafees Bin Zafar, Oscar-winning Bangladeshi animator
- Engineering career
- Discipline: Architectural, civil, structural
- Significant design: National Martyrs' Memorial, Bangladesh National Museum
- Awards: Ekushey Padak; Sheltech Award; Independence Award

Syed Mainul Hossain (17 March 1952 – 10 November 2014) was a Bangladeshi structural engineer and architect. He is the designer of the National Martyrs' Memorial, one of the national landmarks of Bangladesh. He was posthumously awarded the Independence Award in 2022.

== Background ==
Syed Mainul Hossain was born on 17 March 1952 to Syed Mujibul Haq and Syeda Rashida Haq Hena. Mujibul was a history professor at Rajendra College in Faridpur District. Mainul was the eldest among three children. He graduated from Bangladesh University of Engineering and Technology in architecture in 1976.

== List of buildings ==
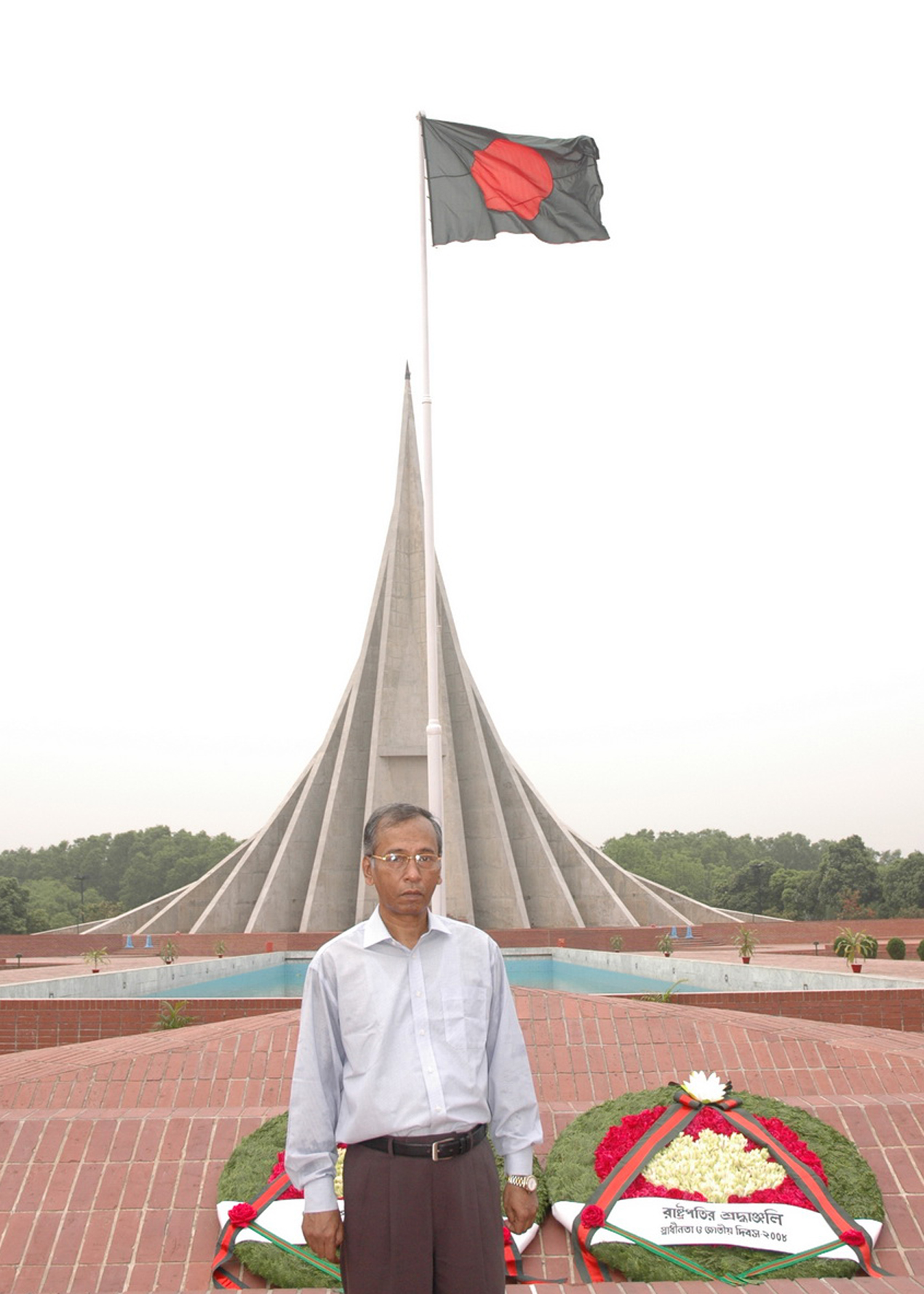
Hossain, next to the National Memorial, a structure he designed himself

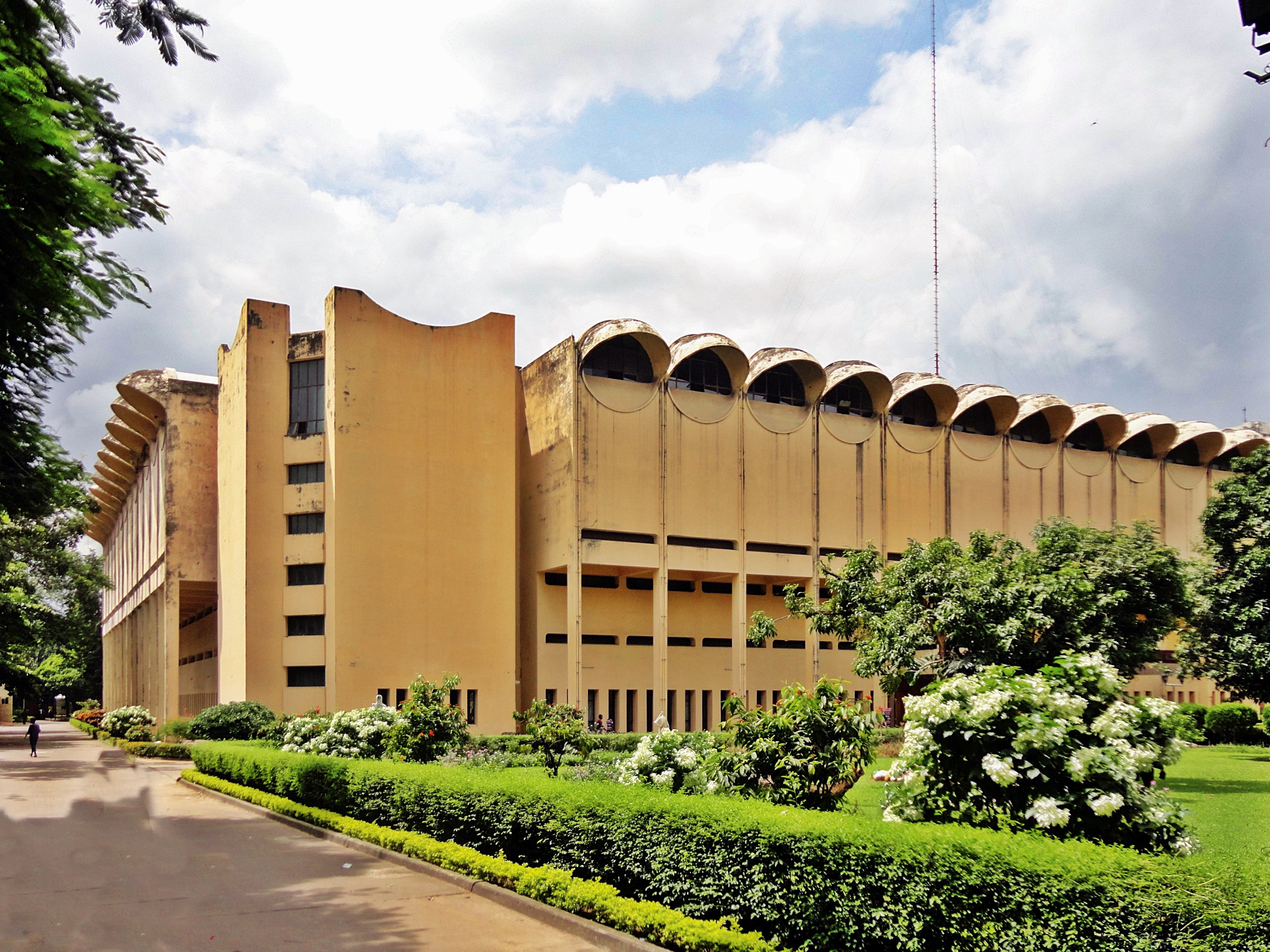
Bangladesh National Museum designed by Hossain

Buildings on which Hossain was involved with design include:

- National Martyrs' Memorial (1978)
- Bangladesh National Museum (1982)
- Vocational teacher training institute and vocational training institute (1977)
- Bangladesh Bar Council Building (1978)
- Chittagong Export Processing Zone's office building (1980)
- Shilpakala Academy auditorium
- Uttara Model Town (Residential Project) (1985)

== Awards ==
- Ekushey Padak (1988)
- Sheltech Award (2007)
- Independence Award (2022)

== Personal life and death ==
Hossain had two daughters, Syeda Tahrima Hossain Bidita and Syeda Tanzina Hossain Amrita.

Hossain died of a heart attack on 10 November 2014 at the National Institute of Cardiovascular Diseases in Dhaka, at the age of 63. He was buried at the Martyred Intellectuals Memorial in Mirpur.
