= Wadsworth E. Pohl =

American engineer

Wadsworth Egmont Pohl
- Born: February 13, 1908; Redlands, California, US
- Died: February 12, 1990 (aged 81); Los Angeles, California, US
- Burial place: Hillside Memorial Park Cemetery; 33°58′50″N 118°23′23″W
- Employer: Technicolor SA
- Spouse: Nancy Pohl
- Children: 3
- Parents: Egmont Sidney Pohl; Kate Denison Pohl
- Awards: Academy Scientific and Technical Award

Wadsworth Egmont Pohl (born February 13, 1908, in Redlands, California - February 12, 1990, in Los Angeles) was an American engineer and inventor who won a Technical Award in 1964, and was credited with the invention or development of the Sodium vapor process and the bluescreen process.

== Life ==
Pohl grew up in California San Bernardino County and received his education in California. His most important achievement in the cinematic field was made in 1964 in association with Petro Vlahos and Ub Iwerks in the film Mary Poppins, in which all three named were awarded an Academy Scientific and Technical Award of Merit "for the conception and perfection of techniques for Color Traveling Matte Composite Cinematography."
