= Theodore Kim =

American computer scientist

- Education: Cornell University (B.S.); UNC Chapel Hill (Ph.D.)
- Awards: NSF CAREER Award (2016); Academy Award for Scientific and Technical Achievement (2013, 2023); Member of the Connecticut Academy of Science and Engineering (2024)
- Scientific career
- Fields: Computer science American Studies
- Workplaces: Yale University; T. J. Watson Research Center; UCSB; University of Saskatchewan; Rhythm & Hues Studios; Evans & Sutherland
- Doctoral advisor: Ming C. Lin

Theodore Kim is a two-time Academy Award-winning computer scientist and full Professor of Computer Science at Yale University, where he is also an affiliate of American Studies and Ethnicity, Race & Migration (ER&M). He is a member of the Computer Graphics Group with Julie Dorsey and Holly Rushmeier.

He is known for his contributions to computer graphics, computer animation, solid mechanics, computational fluid dynamics, and fractal geometry. His team's works have been featured in The Washington Post and The Guardian among others.

== Education ==
He received his Bachelor of Science degree in Computer Science from Cornell University with a minor in English Literature and interned at Evans & Sutherland and Rhythm & Hues Studios. He received a PhD in Computer Science from UNC Chapel Hill in 2006, under the supervision of Ming C. Lin for his dissertation "Physically-based simulation of ice formation."

== Career ==
He was a Post-Doctoral Fellow at IBM TJ Watson Research Center in 2007 and a Post-Doctoral Associate at Cornell University from 2008-2009. From 2009-2011, he was an Assistant Professor in Computer Science at the University of Saskatchewan, and from 2011-2015 a faculty member at UCSB in the Media Arts and Technology Program and the Department of Computer Science. He was a Senior Research Scientist at Pixar Research from 2015-2019 and received screen credits in Cars 3, Coco, Toy Story 4, and Incredibles 2. He has been a Yale faculty member since 2019.

== Awards ==
He received a Technical Achievement Award at the 2013 Scientific & Technical Academy Awards with Nils Thuerey, Markus Gross and Doug James, "for the invention, publication and dissemination of Wavelet Turbulence software" which enabled "fast, art–directable creation of highly detailed gas simulation, making it easier for the artist to control the appearance of these effects in the final image."

He received a second Technical Achievement Award with David Eberle, Fernando de Goes and Audrey Wong in recognition of their contributions to Pixar’s Fizt2 physics simulation system, which provides "a high-performance solver with novel and stable implicit physics and robust collision. The design of this system enables artist workflows to easily apply soft-body dynamics to a broad range of interacting animated characters and objects."

He is also the recipient of the NSF CAREER Award and was elected to the Connecticut Academy of Science and Engineering in 2024.

== Public writing ==
His public writings on labor, race, and technology have appeared in the Los Angeles Times, Scientific American, Time, San Francisco Chronicle, and Washington Post.
