= Mustafa Monwar =

Bangladeshi artist (1935–2026)

- মুস্তফা মনোয়ার
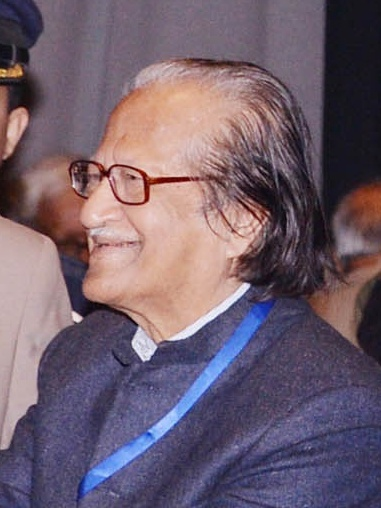
- Monwar in 2016
- Born: 1 September 1935; Jhenaidah District, Shailkupa Upazila, Monoharpur
- Died: 29 June 2026 (aged 90); Dhaka, Bangladesh
- Education: Government College of Art & Craft, Kolkata
- Occupations: Painter, sculptor, artist
- Spouse: Mary Monwar (m. 1965)
- Parents: Golam Mostofa (father); Jamila Khatun (mother)
- Relatives: Syed Mainul Hossain (nephew); Farida Majid (niece); Nafees Bin Zafar (grand-nephew)
- Awards: Ekushey Padak

Signature
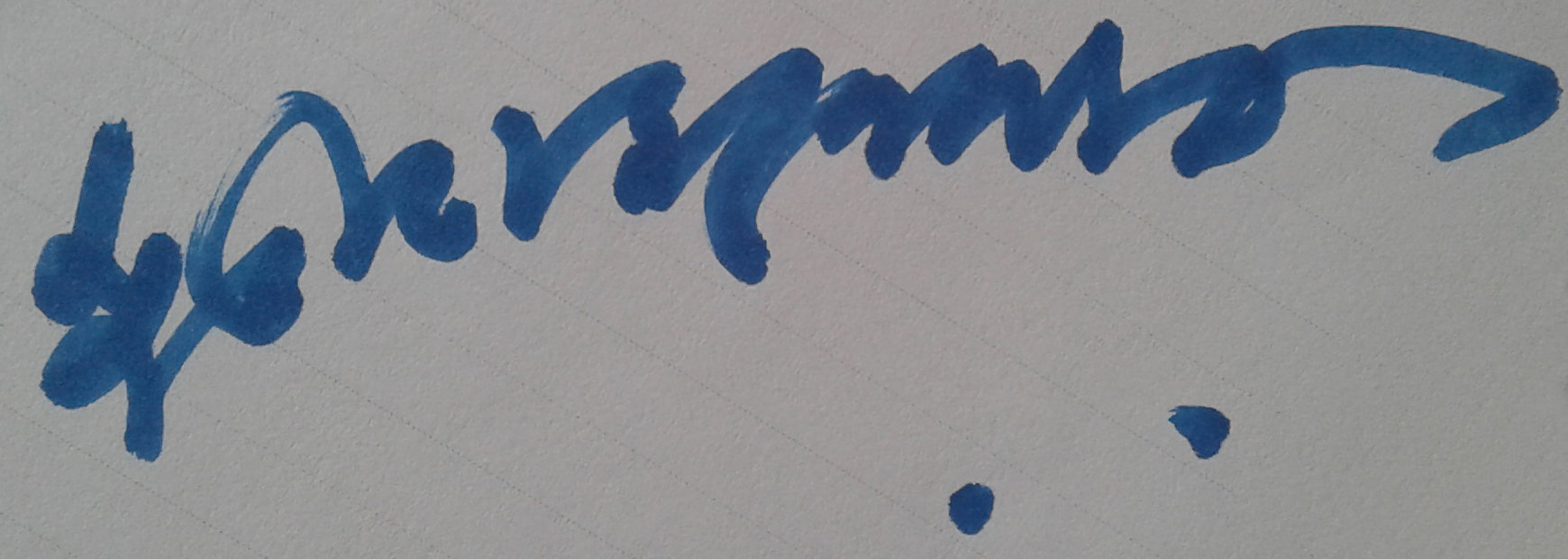

Mustafa Monwar (1 September 1935 – 29 June 2026) was a Bangladeshi artist. He was a painter, sculptor, radio performer, and professor of fine arts. He was awarded Ekushey Padak in 2004 by the government of Bangladesh.

== Early life and education ==
Mustafa Monwar was born at his maternal's house in Kamalapur village, under Kadirpara Union of Sreepur thana at present, in the Magura subdivision (present-day Magura district) of Jashore district. in Magura in the then Bengal Presidency, British India, on 1 September 1935. His ancestral home was in Monoharpur village under Shailkupa Upazila of Jhenaidah District. He was the youngest of six children of poet Golam Mostofa and Jamila Khatun. Monwar's grandfather Golam Rabbani and great-grandfather Kazi Golam Sarwar were folk poets.

Monwar passed his matriculation exam from Narayanganj High School. He was also a student of Dhaka Collegiate School. He was initially admitted to the Scottish Church College of the University of Calcutta where he studied science. Following the advice of the author Syed Mujtaba Ali, he transferred to the Government College of Art & Craft, Kolkata from where he graduated obtaining the best result in his class.

== Career ==
Monwar started his career as a lecturer at the East Pakistan College of Arts and Crafts. Later, he joined the East Pakistan branch of Pakistan Television Corporation (later Bangladesh Television), as director general. Later he became the director general of the Bangladesh Shilpakala Academy and the National Media Institute. He also served as a managing director of the Bangladesh Film Development Corporation.

== Works ==
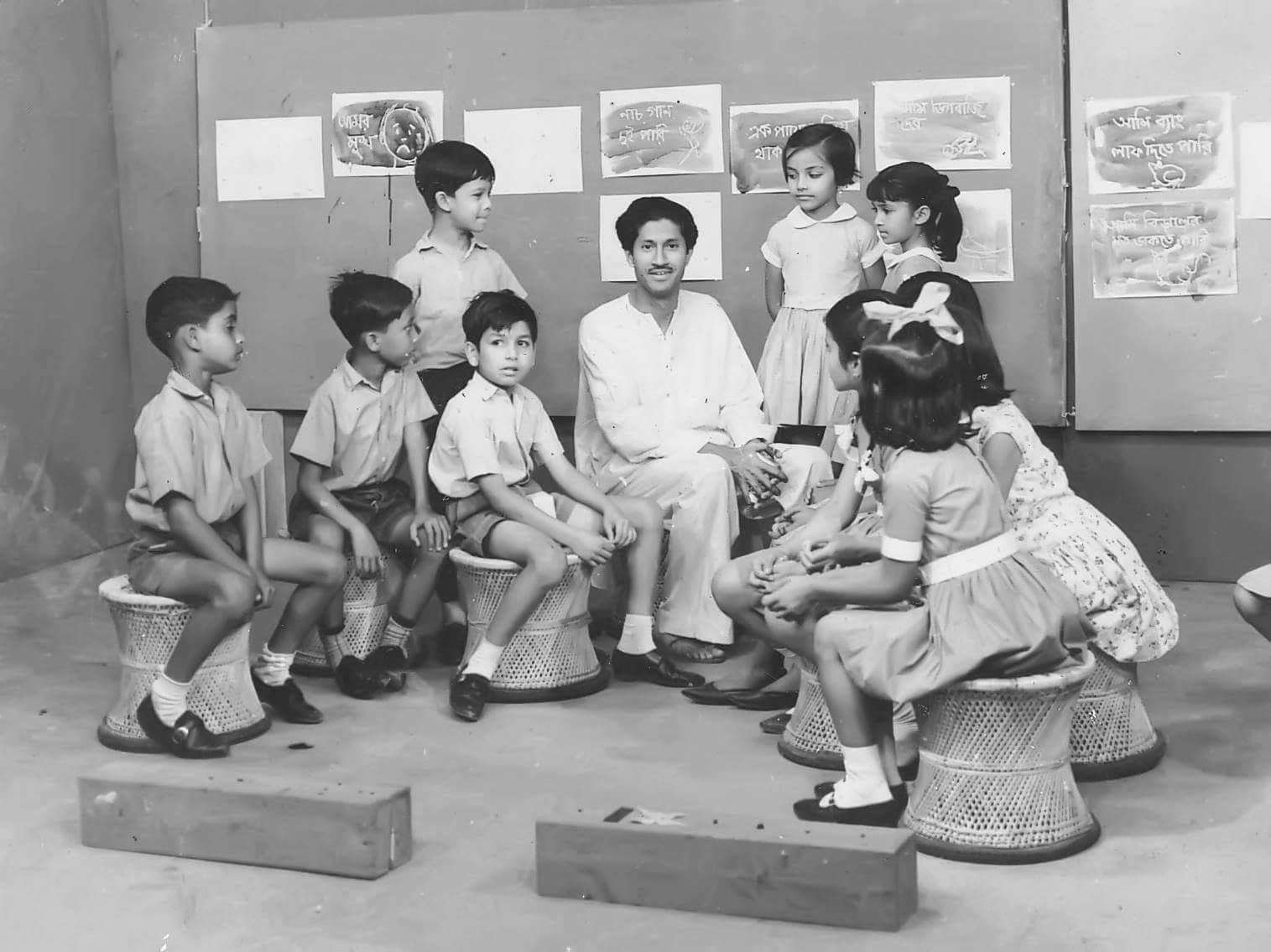
Monwar at a children's show on Bangladesh Television in 1965

During the liberation war of Bangladesh in 1971, he organized puppet shows at the refugee camps in West Bengal. He created puppet plays like Agachha (Weed), Rakkhash (Monster) and A Brave Farmer. He was known as the "Puppet Man of Bangladesh". American documentary filmmaker Lear Levin visited Bangladesh to make a film on his puppets. These scenes were later added to Tareque Masud's film Muktir Gaan (1995).

Monwar's television puppet show Moner Kotha ran on BTV for 12 years. It tells the story of a little girl called Parul and her seven brothers named Champa who were cursed and turned into flowers. It is based on the folklore Saat Bhai Champa. He ran Dhaka-based organization Educational Puppet Development Centre (EPDC).

His teleplays include The Taming of the Shrew by William Shakespeare and Raktokorobi by Rabindranath Tagore. He showcased his own interpretations of Hans Christian Andersen's The Nightingale, and The Ugly Duckling. He was the Bangladesh representative of the Denmark-based International Puppet Development Centre.

== Personal life and death ==
Mustafa Monwar married Mary Monwar in 1965. Together they had one daughter, Nondini Monwar and one son, Sadat Monwar, a pilot of Biman Bangladesh Airlines. Mustafa was the maternal uncle of architect Syed Mainul Hossain, poet Farida Majid, and actress Nima Rahman. Academy Award-winning animator Nafees Bin Zafar was his grand nephew.

After Monwar's sudden drop of oxygen level and blood pressure, he was admitted to Square Hospital in Dhaka on 14 June 2026. He was then treated for multiple health complications in the intensive care unit. He died on 29 June, at the age of 90.

== Awards ==
- All India Fine Arts Competition Award (1957)
- Zainul Abedin Gold Medal
- Ekushey Padak (2004)
- Anando Bichitra Award (2004)
- The Daily Star and Standard Chartered Bank Lifetime Achievement Award Winner (2017)
