= Bangladesh National Museum =

Museum in Dhaka, Bangladesh

- বাংলাদেশ জাতীয় জাদুঘর
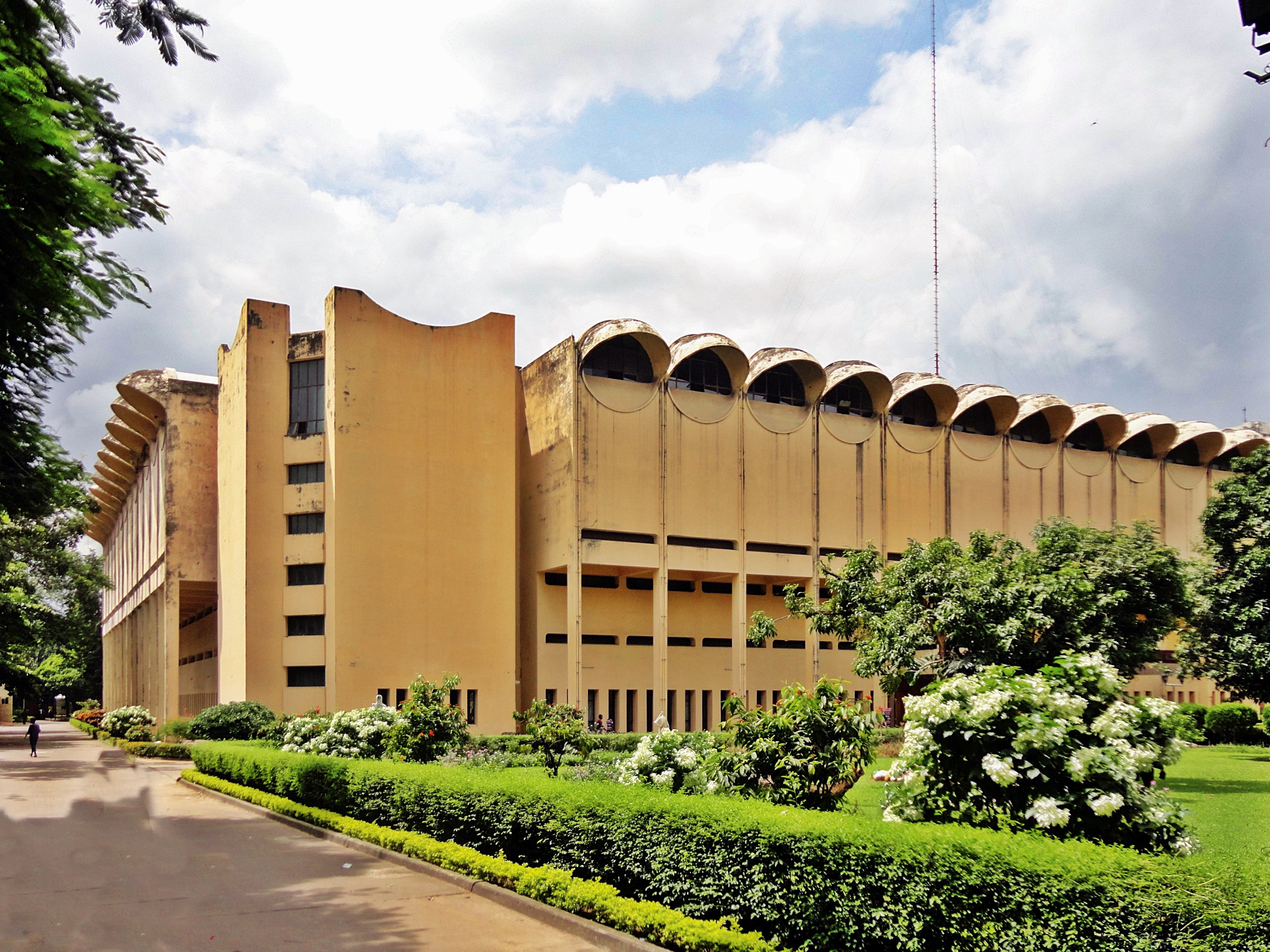
- Former name: Dacca Museum
- Established: 20 March 1913; 113 years ago
- Location: Shahbag, Dhaka, Bangladesh
- Coordinates: 23°44.25′N 90°23.67′E
- Visitors: c. 15 million (including c. 1.2 million foreigners) per year
- Director: Md. Kamruzzaman
- Website: bangladeshmuseum.gov.bd

The Bangladesh National Museum (Bengali: বাংলাদেশ জাতীয় জাদুঘর, romanized: Bānlādēśa Jātīẏa Jādughara) is the national repository of Bangladesh's cultural and historical artifacts, located in the Shahbag area of Dhaka.

The museum was established on 20 March 1913, under the name Dhaka Museum, and was formally inaugurated on 7 August 1913. With an initial collection of 379 objects, it was opened to the public on 25 August 1914. After the independence of Bangladesh in 1971, the institution was reorganized under the name Bangladesh National Museum, incorporating various parts of the former Dhaka Museum, and was formally inaugurated in its present form in 1983. The museum has departments of ethnography and decorative art, history and classical art, natural history, and world civilization. Artifacts from the prehistoric era to contemporary history are displayed here, which include over 50,000 ancient and medieval coins, Buddhist sculptures from the Gandhara period, and exhibits related to the 1971 Liberation War.

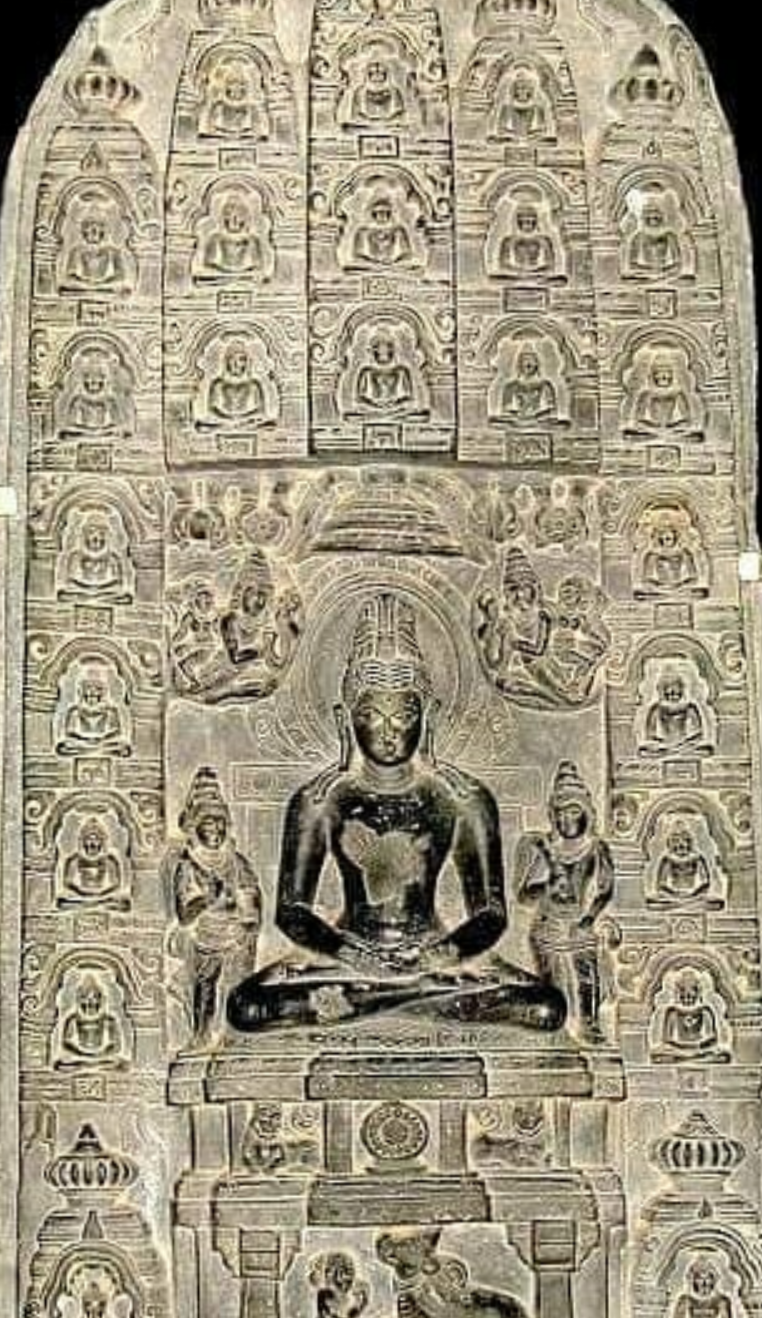
The idol of Rishabhdeva in seated posture in display.

== History ==
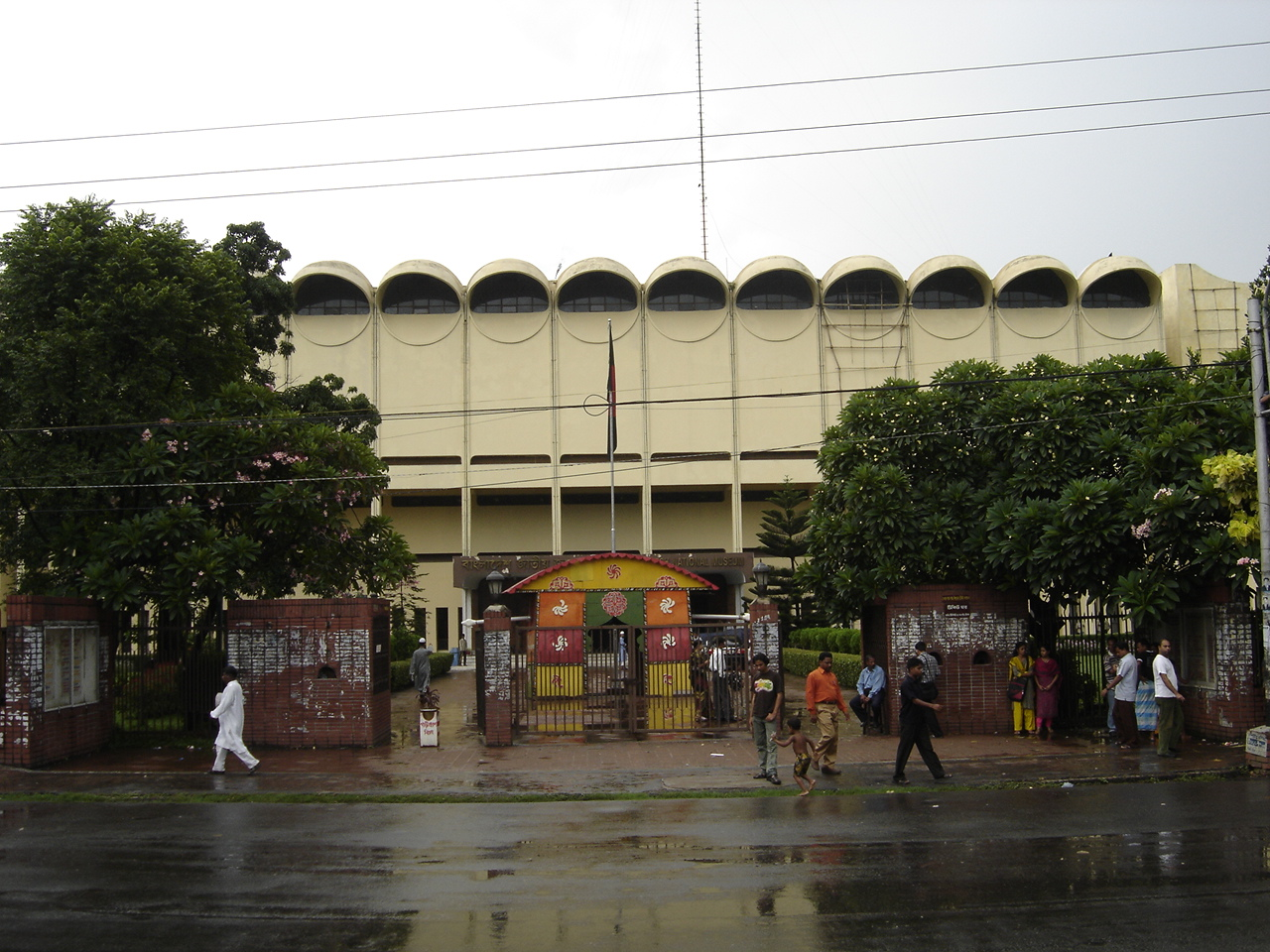
Bangladesh National Museum designed by Syed Mainul Hossain

In 1855, the Asiatic Society of Bengal proposed establishing a museum in Dhaka, but it was postponed due to logistical constraints. Later, in 1907, this initiative re-emerged among the elite class of Dhaka. Following this, on 20 March 1913, the Dhaka Museum was formally established by the government of undivided Bengal. It was initially located in a room of the old Secretariat building (later part of Dhaka Medical College Hospital). The institution was supported by subscriptions amounting to nearly 10,000 taka from the residents of Dhaka and an initial government grant of 2,000 taka. On 7 August 1913, the Lieutenant Governor of Bengal, Lord Thomas David Gibson Carmichael, inaugurated it for the public in the old building of Jagannath University College, in the presence of local dignitaries. The initial collection comprised about 500 items, primarily including regional archaeological artifacts, coins, manuscripts, and folk art. As the collection grew, it was relocated to the Nimtali Baroduari building by 1915. After the partition of India in 1947, the institution continued to operate as the Dhaka Museum in East Pakistan and faced several administrative challenges. For example, following the death of its first curator, Nalini Kanta Bhattasali, there was no permanent curator from 1947 to 1951, and during this time, its premises were temporarily occupied by a press agency. A part-time curator was appointed in 1951–1952, and in 1954, Enayetur Rahman joined as the curator. Exhibits from sites damaged by the attacks of the Pakistan Army in 1971 (such as the Dinajpur Rajbari and Baldha Museum) were transferred here. Additionally, the collection of war-related documents and artifacts began with the aim of documenting information about the Bengali liberation struggle. After independence, in 1972, the institution was renamed 'Bangladesh National Museum' in line with the identity of the newly independent state, and it officially received this name through a government order in 1974. A trustee board was formed in 1970 and a National Museum Commission in 1974 for its oversight. As part of the restructuring during the 1970s and 1980s, a new site for the museum in Shahbagh was approved by ECNEC in December 1975. Specialized curatorial departments, such as anthropology, decorative arts, and history, were established to manage the growing collection. Finally, on 17 November 1983, the new building in Shahbagh, equipped with modern facilities, was opened to the public.

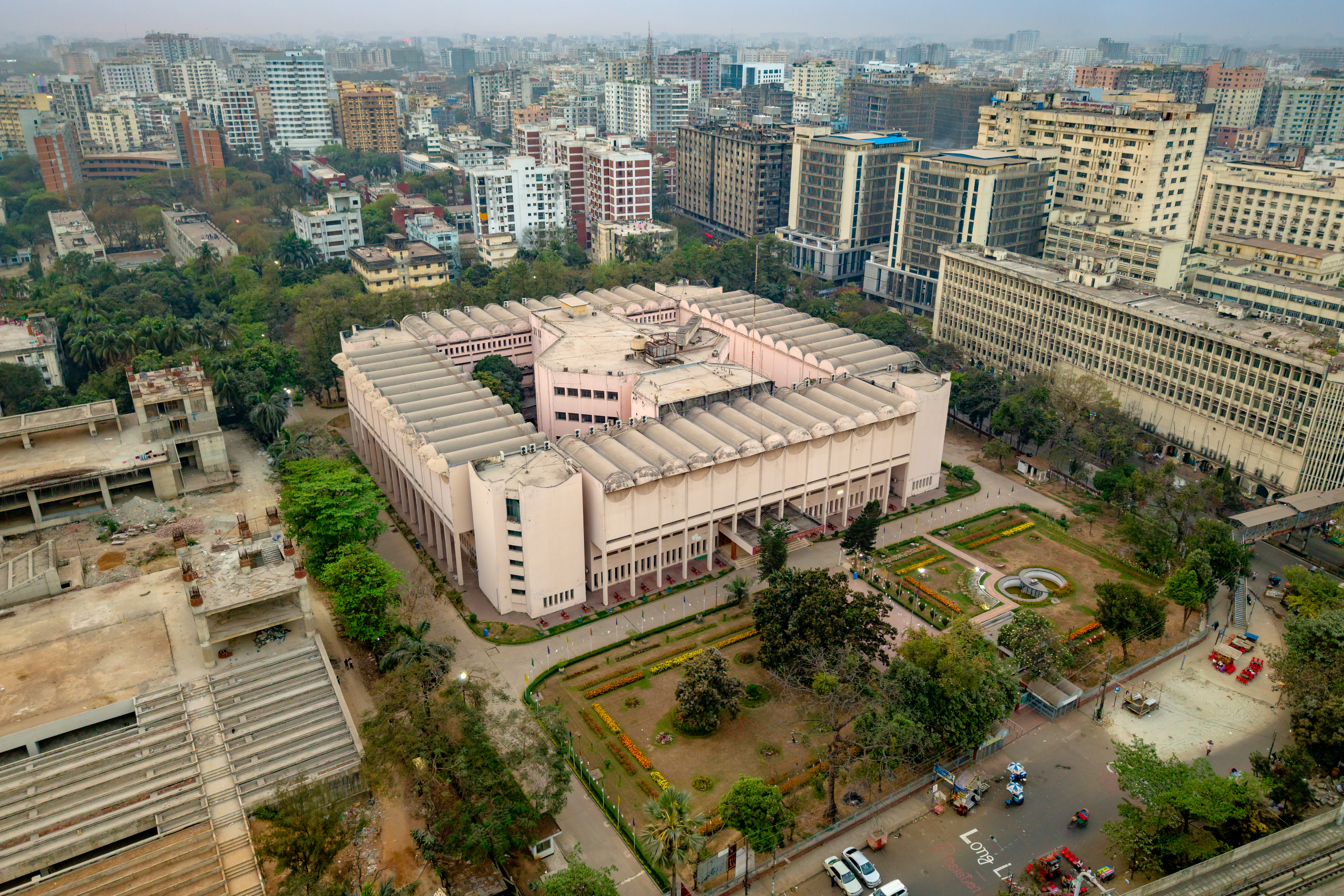
Aerial View of Bangladesh National Museum

By 2017, as a result of ongoing acquisitions and research, the collection of the Bangladesh National Museum reached 91,287 artifacts, among which historical, ethnographic, and natural history items are particularly noteworthy. As part of a broader institutional modernization, the museum initiated a digitization project in 2012. Its objective was to create a database of the entire collection, improving access to and preservation of artifacts within the limited exhibition space. In April 2017, the museum launched a 360-degree virtual gallery, making selected exhibits accessible to a global audience through online tours. Furthermore, since 2010, UNESCO has been collaborating with the institution on work related to intangible cultural heritage.

== Visitors ==
On average, more than 2000 visitors come to visit the Bangladesh National Museum every day. Foreigners are also among them. The visitor fee is Tk 40 for adults and Tk 20 for minors, Tk 500 for foreigners, and Tk 300 for visitors from SAARC countries. However, tickets are not required for children below 3 years of age and physically challenged persons.

== Structure ==
The categories of artifacts of the National Museum are:

- History and Classical Art
- Ethnology and Decorative Arts
- Contemporary Art and World Civilization
- Department of Natural History
- Conservation Laboratory

There is also a public education department.

=== Ground floor ===
The ground floor consists of some old guns at the entrance and the hall where the people book their tickets or assemble to hear the history of the museum. The hall leads to a grand staircase. Beside the hall, there is a smaller room that also acts like the hall (it is also used by the guides to tell the visitors about the history) and a simple staircase.

=== First floor ===
The first floor is divided into 22 rooms.

==== First room ====
The first room displays a large map showing the map of Bangladesh and its 64 districts.

==== Second room ====
The second room consists of a large statue of a royal Bengal tiger.

==== Third-tenth rooms ====
These rooms consist of natural beauties found in Bangladesh. In one of the rooms, there is a showcase of a tongue of a whale.

==== Tenth-22nd rooms ====
The other rooms contain some historic relics of Bengal up to 1900. There is a room that shows the different boats used by the rural people.

=== Second floor ===
The second floor consists of photos of famous people and showcases the Bangladesh Liberation War, genocide, and the Language Movement of 1952. There are posters used in the war, a torture machine, and much more. There are also two libraries.

=== Third floor ===
The third floor consists of pictures of international politicians, artists, scientists, famous pictures and four international galleries – Chinese, Korean, Iranian, and Swiss.

== Gallery ==
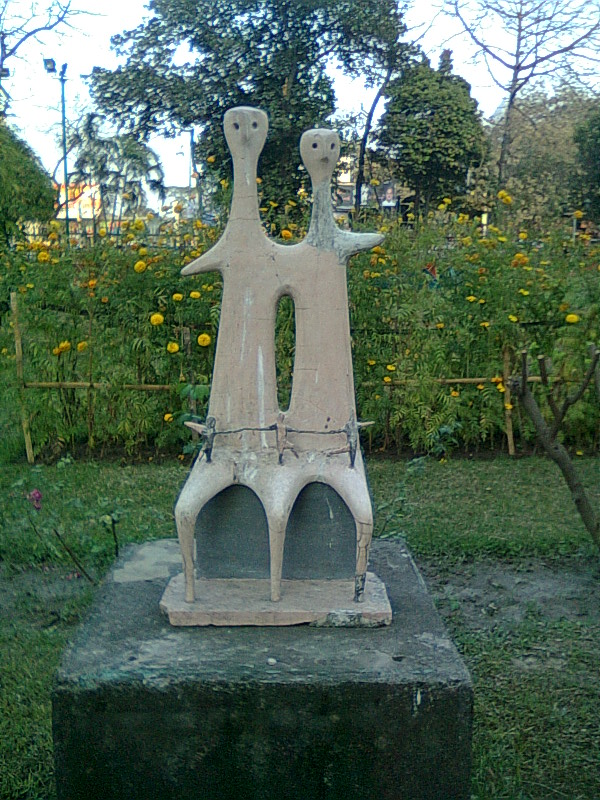
Composition,
Novera Ahmed

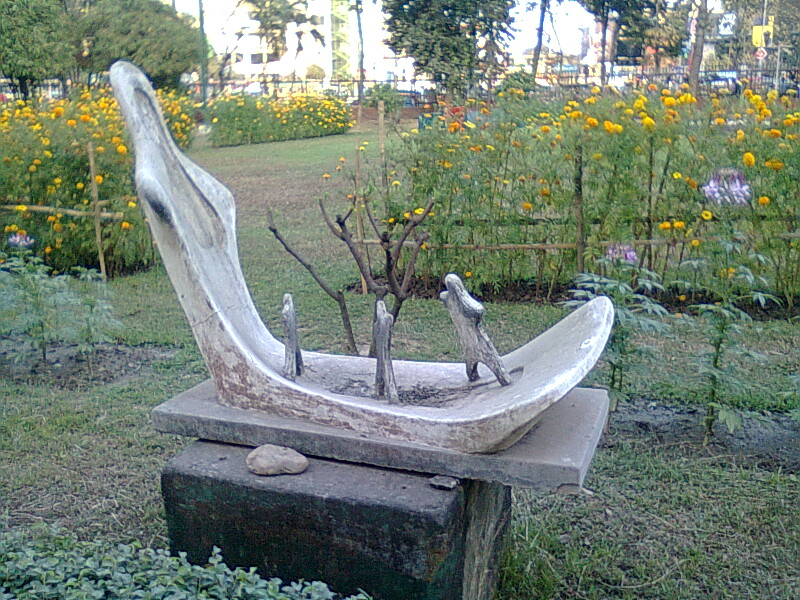
Reclining Figure,
Novera Ahmed

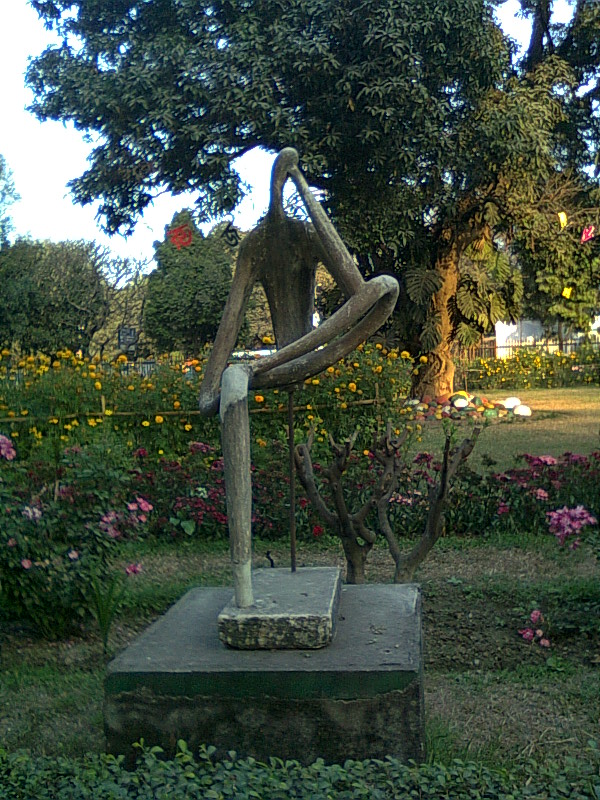
Seated Woman,
Novera Ahmed

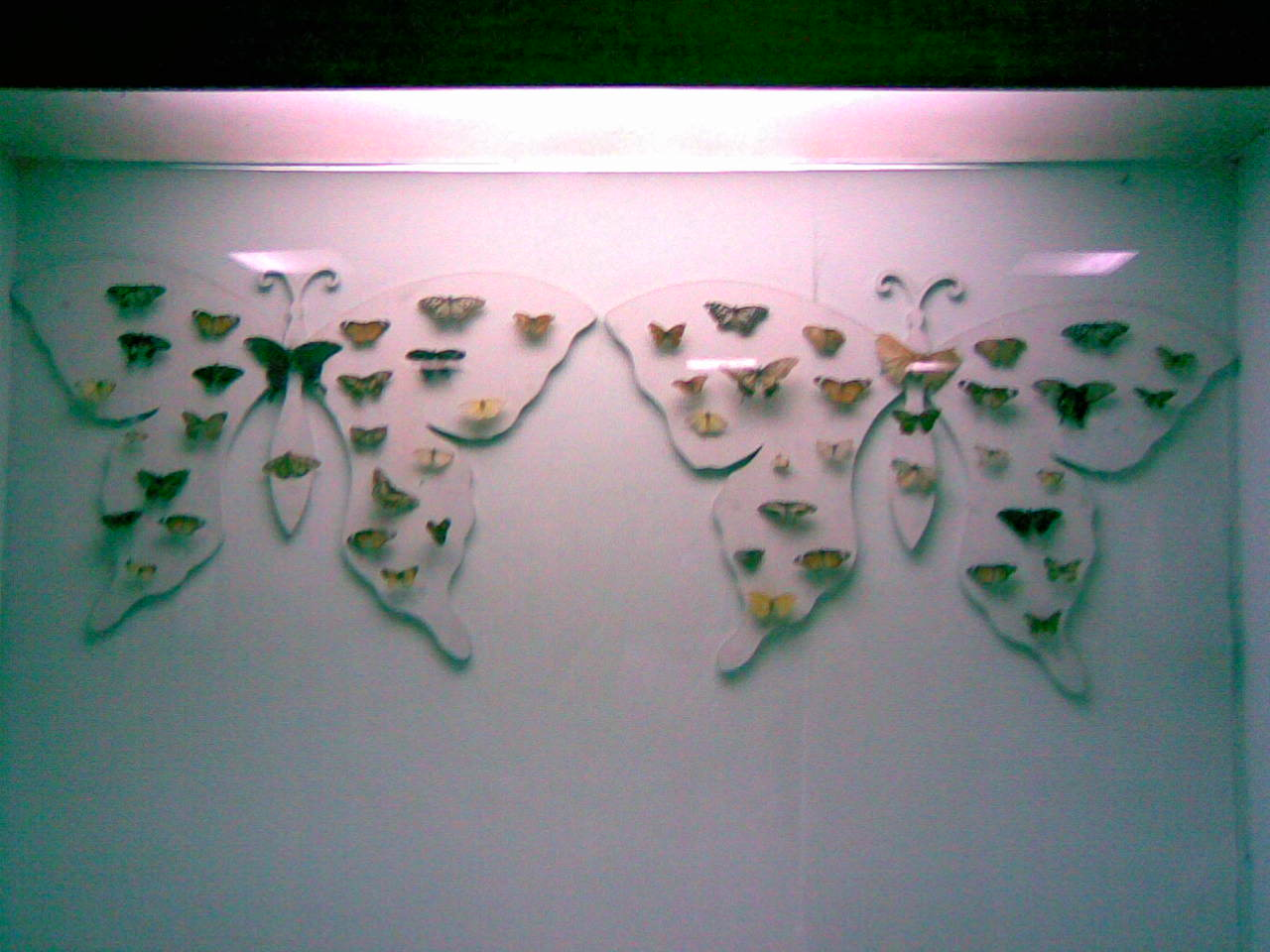

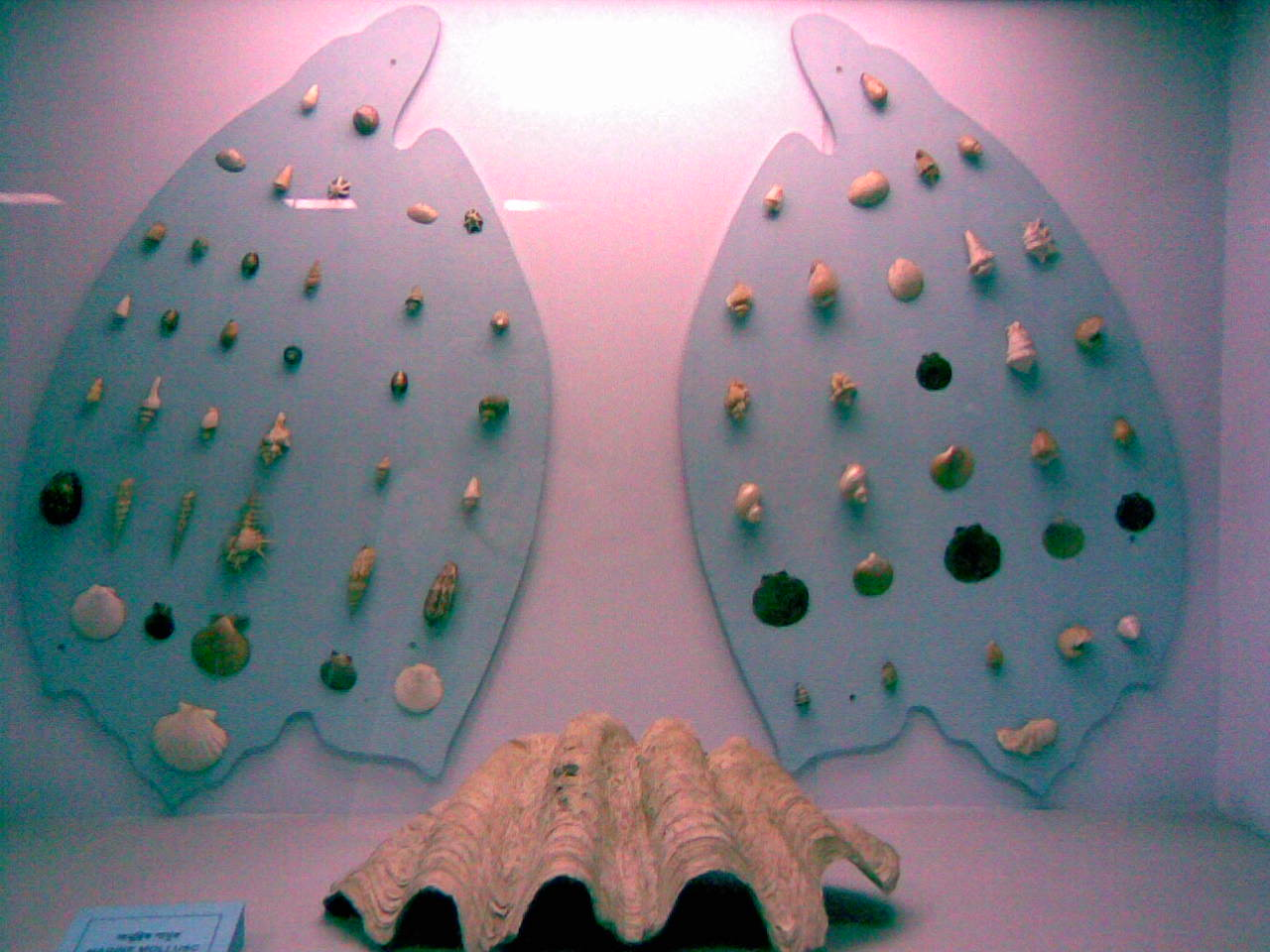

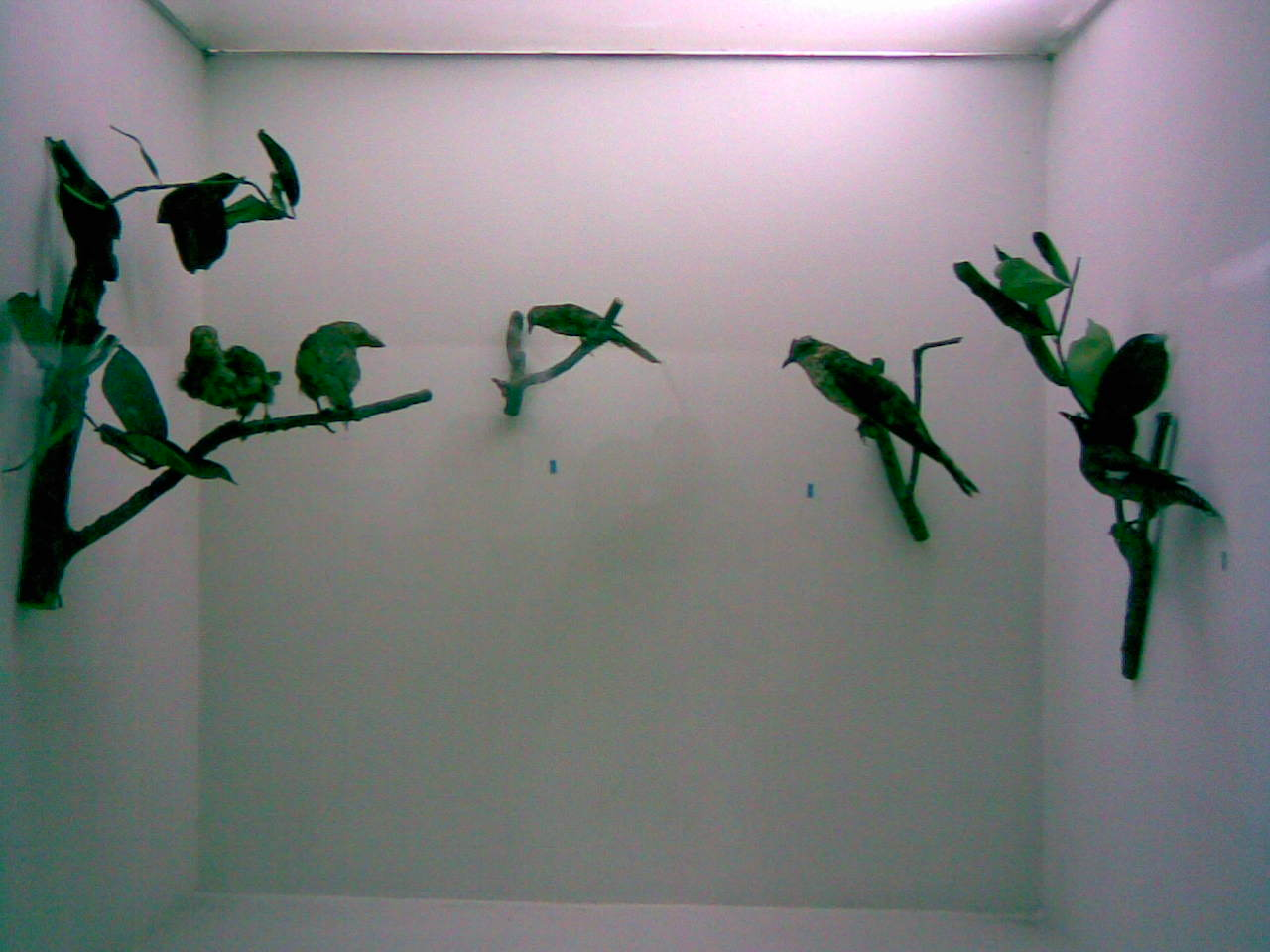

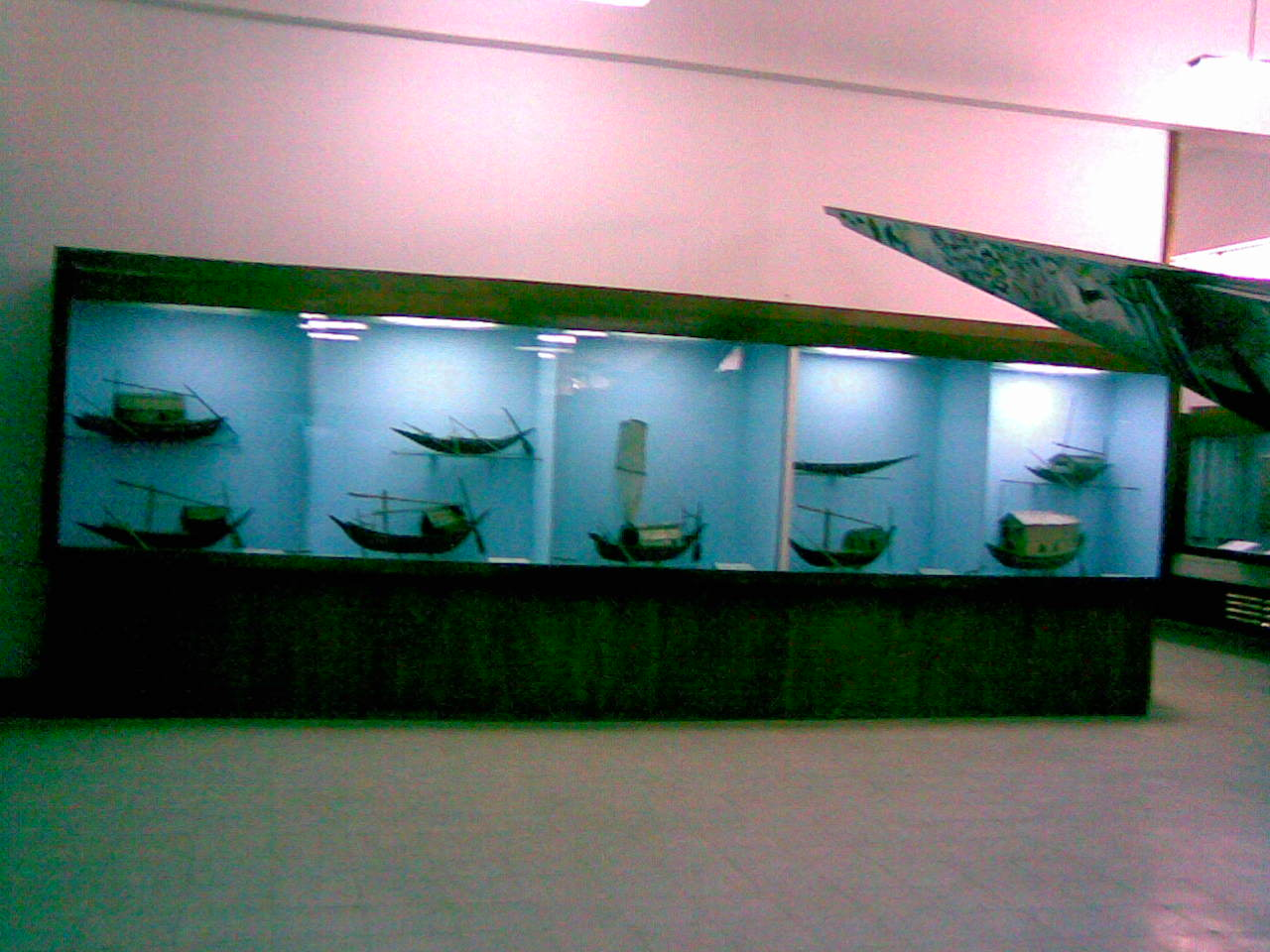

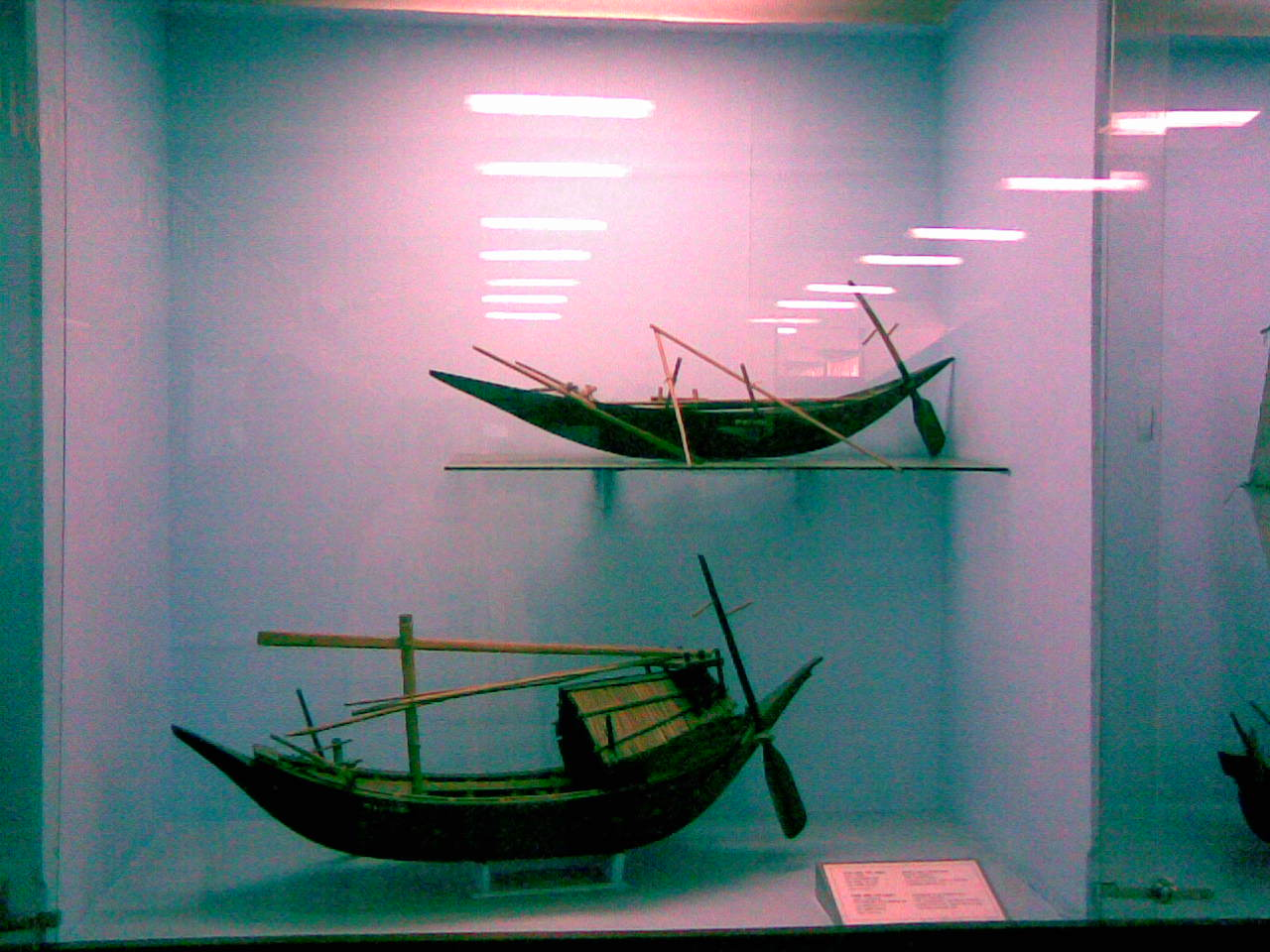

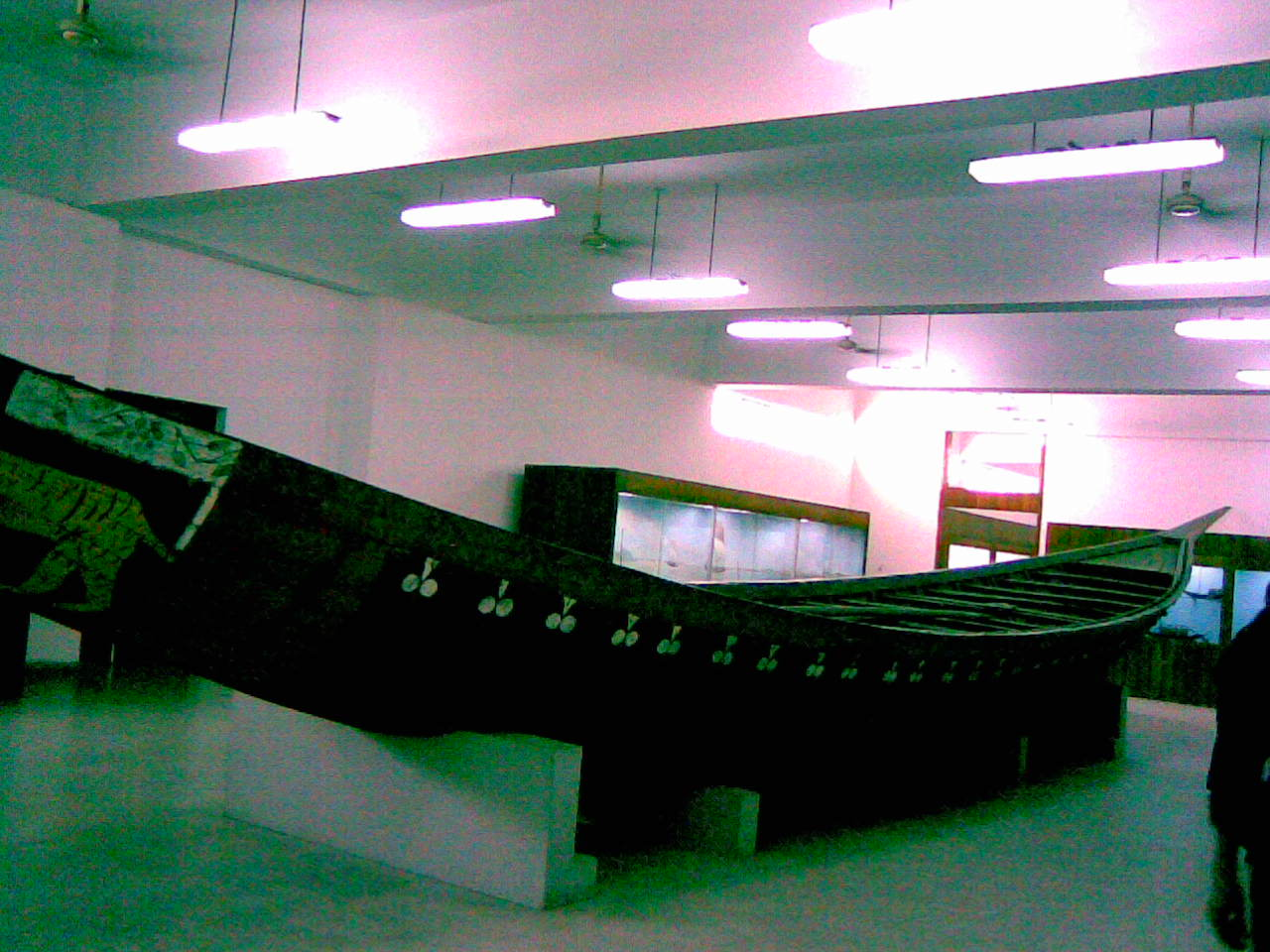

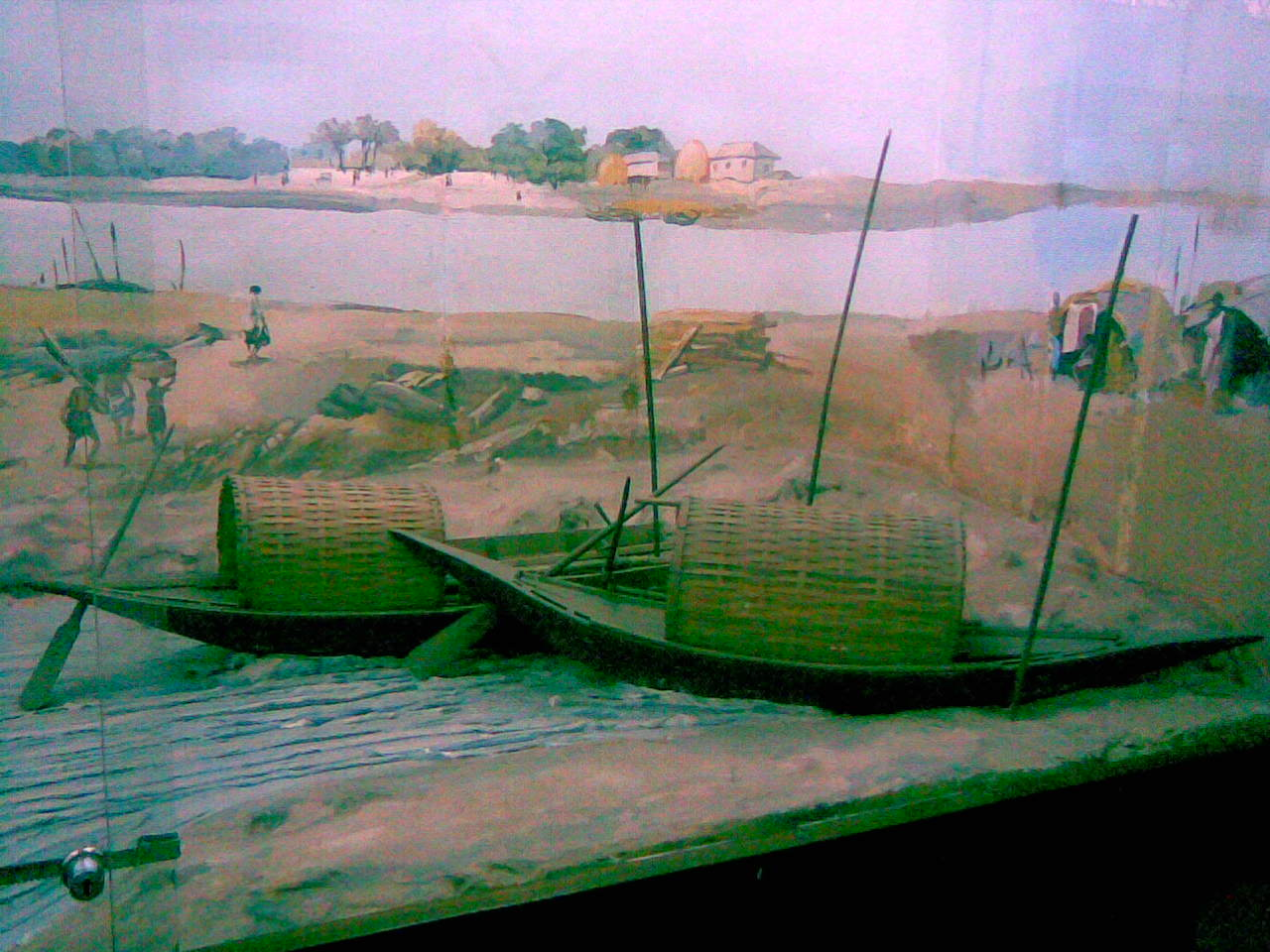

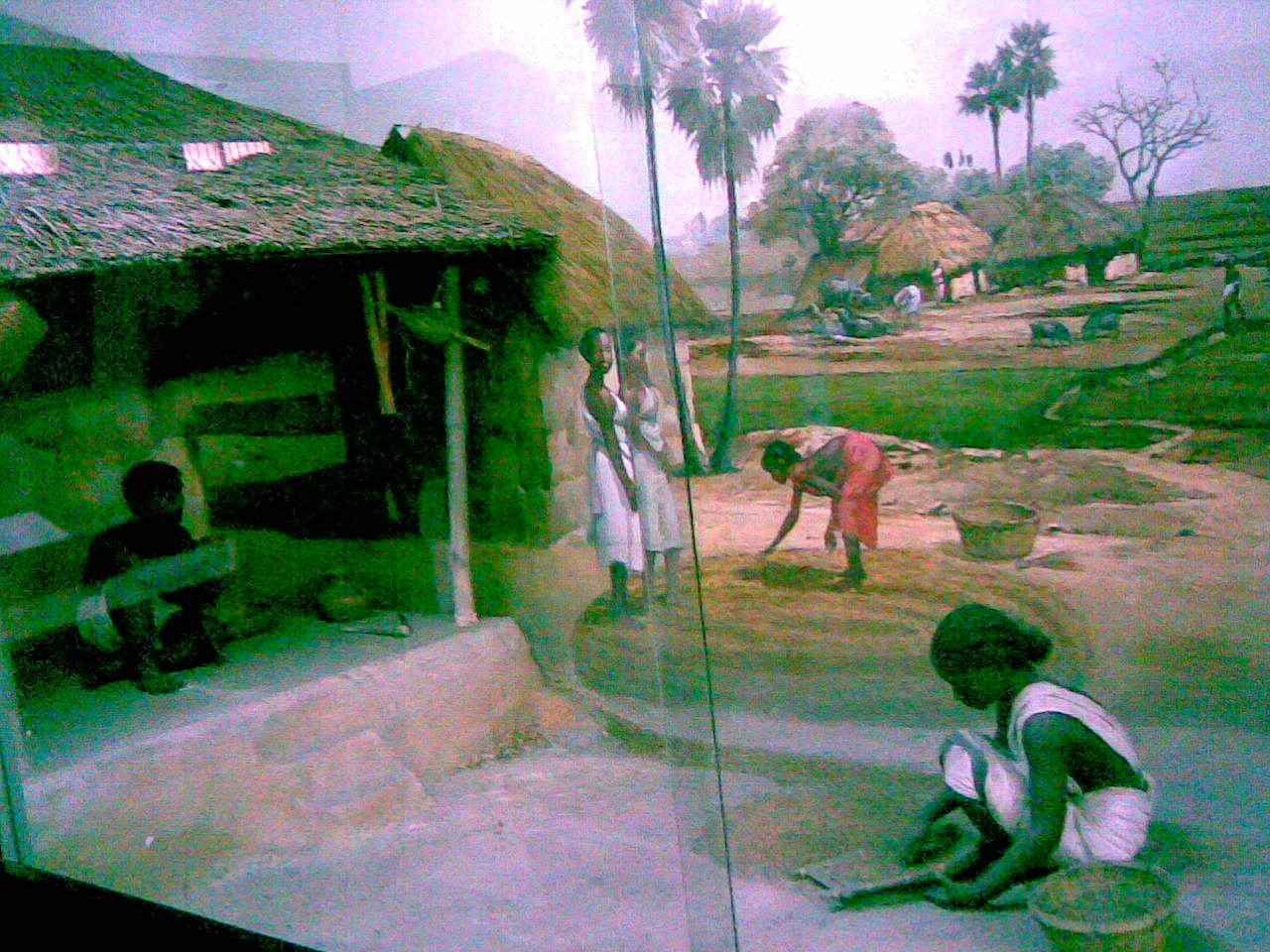

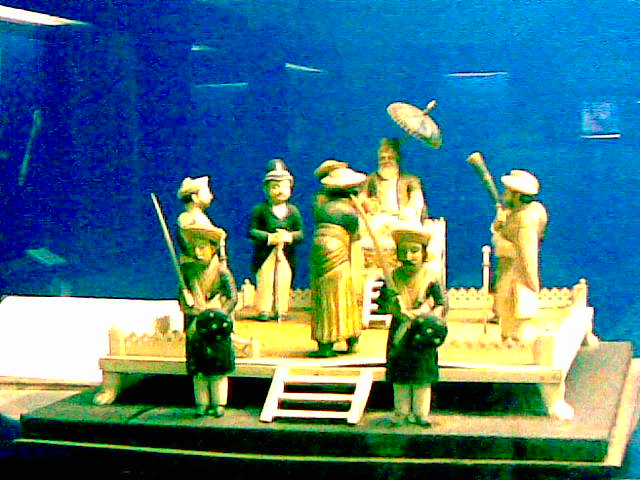
