= Johné Parker =

American mechanical engineer

Johné Michelle Parker (born 1964) is an American mechanical engineer and advocate for minority participation in STEM fields, whose research has included work on surface coatings and their defects, computer vision, smart manufacturing, and wireless systems. She is an associate professor at the University of Kentucky, in the Department of Mechanical and Aerospace Engineering, and associate dean for access, community and engagement in the Stanley and Karen Pigman College of Engineering.

== Education and career ==
Parker is originally from Montgomery, Alabama, where she was born in 1964, and grew up in Tuskegee, Alabama. After a year of study at the Tuskegee University, she became an undergraduate at Georgia Tech, receiving a bachelor's degree in mechanical engineering in 1985. After working in the oil industry from 1984 to 1990, she returned to graduate study in mechanical engineering at Georgia Tech, and completed her Ph.D. there in 1996. Her dissertation, An analytical and experimental investigation of physically accurate synthetic images for machine vision design, was supervised by Kok-Meng Lee and Holly Rushmeier.

She became an assistant professor of mechanical engineering at the University of Kentucky in 1996, and was promoted to associate professor in 2002. She became acting associate dean for diversity, equity and inclusion (subsequently retitled as associate dean for access, community and engagement ) in 2022.

In 2005–2006 she took a sabbatical to serve as an American Association for the Advancement of Science (AAAS) and American Society of Mechanical Engineers (ASME) Congressional Fellow, in the office of North Dakota Senator Byron Dorgan. She has also lead efforts to promote minority participation in STEM through The Kentucky–West Virginia Louis Stokes Alliance for Minority Participation.

== Recognition ==
Parker was named as an ASME Fellow, in its 2026 class of fellows.
