= Julie Dorsey =

American computer scientist

- Education: Cornell University (B.S., B.Arch., M.S., Ph.D.)
- Awards: National Science Foundation CAREER Award, Sloan Research Fellowship
- Scientific career
- Fields: Computer science Architecture
- Workplaces: Yale University; Massachusetts Institute of Technology
- Doctoral advisor: Donald P. Greenberg
- Notable students: Kavita Bala

Julie Dorsey is an American computer scientist specializing in computer graphics. With architecture as a driving application, her research in computer graphics has included work on high-dynamic-range imaging, image-based modeling and rendering, and billboarding. She is the Frederick W. Beinecke Professor of Computer Science at Yale University, and the founder and Chief Scientist of 3D sketching software company Mental Canvas.

== Affiliations ==
Julie Dorsey is from Fairfield, Connecticut, and her parents are Virginia L. O'Brien and Stephen J. O'Brien. In August 1989, she married John Luke Kurkpatrick Dorsey.

== Education and career ==
Dorsey was an undergraduate at Cornell University, where she earned bachelor's degrees in both architecture and computer science. She completed her Ph.D. in computer science at Cornell in 1993. Her dissertation, Computer Graphics Techniques For Opera Lighting Design And Simulation, was supervised by Donald P. Greenberg.

She was a tenured professor of computer science and engineering and architecture at the Massachusetts Institute of Technology before moving to Yale in 2002. Dorsey is currently a professor of computer science at Yale, focusing on computer graphics, and a primary faculty at Yale's department of Computing and the Arts (C2).

== Mental Canvas ==
In 2007, Dorsey started to develop her technology now known as Mental Canvas with funding from the National Science Foundation. After studying architecture and computer science for her undergraduate degree, Dorsey became interested in computer science's applications in image rendering and spacial design. Dorsey developed Mental Canvas to bridge 2D and 3D graphics, software engineering and, human-interaction design. The company's goal is to improve communication through elavating drawing mediums. In 2012, to develop and further the technology, Dorsey participated in the NSF Innovation Corps program to learn how to market her technology from a business standpoint and pitch the idea to potential investors. Mental Canvas's capabilities were first demonstrated in "The Other Side" by Istvan Banyai, an illustrated book. Mental Canvas was featured at LightBox Expo 2012, where Dorsey presented the technology in virtual presentation.

== Contributions ==
Dorsey is the co-author of the book Digital Modeling of Material Appearance (with Holly Rushmeier and François Sillion, Morgan Kaufmann, 2008). She was editor-in-chief of ACM Transactions on Graphics from 2012 to 2014. Dorsey contributed to SIGGRAPH '02: Proceedings of the 29th annual conference on Computer graphics and interactive techniques in which she co-authored articled titled Fast bilateral filtering for the display of high-dynamic-range images with Fredo Durand.

== Recognition ==
Dorsey was the winner of the Richard Kelly Award of the Illuminating Engineering Society of North America, and the Harold E. Edgerton Faculty Achievement Award of the Massachusetts Institute of Technology. In 2018 she was a winner of the Microsoft Female Founders Competition, providing venture capital to fund her company Mental Canvas. Dorsey has served in multiple conference committees for ACM SIGGRAPH. Prior to being the Papers Chair for ACM SIGGRAPH in 2006, she was associate editor for IEEE Transactions on Visualization and Computer Graphics and The Visual Computer. She has also received the MIT’s Edgerton Faculty Achievement Award, a National Science Foundation CAREER Award, and an Alfred P. Sloan Foundation Research Fellowship.
