= Petro Vlahos =

American cinema pioneer (1916–2013)

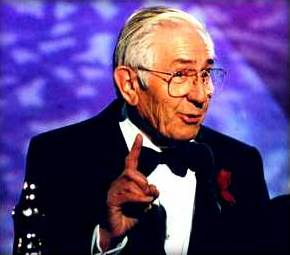
- Vlahos accepting his second Oscar, c. 1993
- Born: August 20, 1916; Raton, New Mexico, U.S.
- Died: February 10, 2013 (aged 96); Los Angeles, California, U.S.
- Education: University of California at Berkeley
- Occupation: Special effects engineer

Petro Vlahos (Greek: Πέτρος Βλάχος; August 20, 1916 – February 10, 2013) was an American engineer and inventor, considered to be one of the pioneering scientific and technical innovators of the motion picture and television industries. He is remembered in particular for creating the Ultimatte process, which refined chroma key or blue screening. For his contributions, Vlahos received three Oscars and an Emmy.

== Early life ==
Vlahos was born in Raton, New Mexico, the son of Greek immigrants. He showed an early aptitude for electronics and ham radio, and in 1941, he gained his Engineering degree from the University of California at Berkeley. He worked as a designer for Douglas Aircraft in World War II, and later as a radar engineer at Bell Laboratories. After the war, he moved to Hollywood and worked for MGM.

== Hollywood career ==
The technology used today as a way of combining actors with background footage still derives from the techniques he developed. Vlahos was not the first to use the blue-screen technology — it was invented by Larry Butler for the 1940 filming of The Thief of Bagdad — but he made the process much more realistic and scientific. He created a system called the sodium vapor process first for The Parent Trap and The Absent-Minded Professor and later the Disney musical Mary Poppins (1964) which would win him an academy award. For the film Ben Hur he refined the color-difference bluescreen process that made memorable visual effects possible in films and developed a way to minimize the unfortunate side effects of earlier methods. Vlahos' breakthrough was to create a complicated laboratory process which involved separating the blue, green and red parts of each frame before combining them back together in a certain order. He moved the process along and introduced the use of motion control cameras during bluescreen work. He called his cutting-edge invention the colour-difference travelling matte scheme.

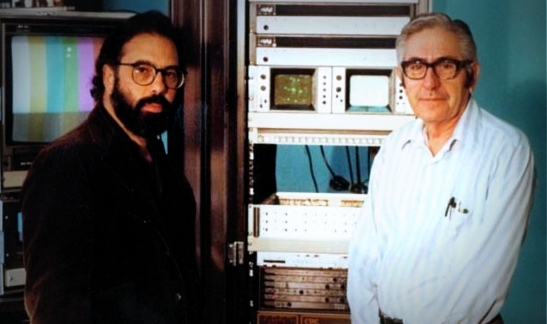
Francis Ford Coppola (left) and Vlahos

Along with his son, Paul Vlahos, he founded the Ultimatte Corporation in Chatsworth, California, in 1976. His company's first Ultimatte units were analog "black boxes" which later evolved into advanced, real-time digital hardware and computer software products.

When sci-fi and fantasy films became dominant at the box office, Vlahos’ techniques became dominant in filmmaking, essential to movies such as the Star Wars trilogy. Refinements of his pioneering technique were used to make many of the blockbuster films of the 1990s, notably Titanic (1997), in which dangerous, expensive or difficult to film scenes were finally possible.

In all, Petro Vlahos held more than 35 patents for film-related gadgetry.

== Accolades ==
A member of the Academy’s original Motion Picture Research Council, he was honored by the Academy of Motion Picture Arts and Sciences many times, starting with a Scientific and Technical Award in 1960 for a camera flicker indicating device.

He won his first Oscar in 1964 for the "conception and perfection of techniques for color traveling matte composite cinematography."

In 1978, Petro won an Emmy Award for Ultimatte Compositing Technology.

The Academy of Motion Picture Arts and Sciences gave him a Medal of Commendation in 1992. In 1993 he was the recipient of the Gordon E. Sawyer Award, his second Oscar.

In 1995, he shared a third Oscar (Academy Scientific and Technical Award) with his son, Paul, for the blue-screen advances made by Ultimatte Corporation.
