= Farida Majid =

Bangladeshi poet, translator, and academic (1942–2021)

- ফরিদা মজিদ
- Born: 27 July 1942; Kolkata, Bengal Province, British India
- Died: 28 September 2021 (aged 79); Dhaka, Bangladesh
- Education: Eden Mohila College; New York University
- Occupations: Poet, translator, and academic
- Spouse: Robert G. Boughey (divorced)
- Relatives: Golam Mostofa (grandfather); Mustafa Monwar (uncle)

Farida Majid (27 July 1942 – 28 September 2021) was a Bangladeshi poet, translator, and academic.

Part of the first generation of Bangladeshi writers producing English-language work, Majid was an influential member of the London literary scene in the 1970s, when she ran the independent Salamander press. She then spent two decades as a professor of language and culture in New York before returning to Bangladesh in her later years.

== Early life and education ==
Farida Majid was born in 1942 in Kolkata, India. Her mother, Jochna, was the eldest daughter of the Bengali writer Golam Mostofa. Majid began writing at a young age, and her poet grandfather encouraged and guided her early work. She published her first poem at age 10 in a Bengali newspaper called The Age.

After completing grade school, she first attended Eden Mohila College, a women's college at the University of Dhaka, where she studied chemistry. However, after a year she met and married the American architect Robert Boughey, with whom she moved to the United States. There, she studied English literature at New York University. After five years in the United States in which her marriage fell apart, she resettled in London in 1971, where she became deeply involved in the city's literary scene, regularly hosting salons in her Chelsea apartment throughout the 1970s.

== Career ==
Majid is best known for her work as a poet, essayist, and translator. She is considered a member of the first generation of Bangladeshi writers in English.

A prolific poet, throughout her career she published both poetry and essays in various periodicals, but only published one book of her own writing, the poetry collection Ganda Phuler Proyan o Jara Benche Thakbe.

In addition to her own work, she translated Bangladeshi literature, including the writing of such authors as Humayun Azad, into English, as well as English literature into Bengali. She also translated from Arabic to Bengali, including parts of the Quran. In 1974, she worked as an editor and translator to produce the anthology Take Me Home, Rickshaw: Poems by Contemporary Poets of Bangladesh. She also edited a 1977 collection of English-language poems titled Thursday Evening Anthology.

From 1974 to 1980, Majid served as managing editor of the London-based publisher Salamander. She also ran its eponymous literary magazine, which published essays, poetry, fiction, and works in translation.

However, in late 1979 she was forced to leave the United Kingdom, having been denied residency by British authorities despite a support campaign by various influential figures including the poet Ted Hughes. She moved to the United States, as she retained U.S. citizenship due to her previous marriage. There, she took up various teaching posts in the New York area, including at Columbia University, where she taught Bengali language and literature from 1984 to 1989; the City University of New York, where she taught language, writing, and cultural studies from 1991 to 2005; and the College of New Rochelle. While at the City University of New York, she taught at the Hostos Community College, LaGuardia Community College and York College.

== Activism ==
Majid was active in anti-Pakistan protests in London during the 1971 Bangladesh Liberation War. She was also involved with the Nirmul Committee, which sought justice for the violence committed against Bangladeshis during the war.

== Later years and death ==
After four decades abroad, Majid returned to Bangladesh in 2006. She died in September 2021, while undergoing cancer treatment in Dhaka. On her death, fellow poet Razu Alauddin described her as a writer and academic who was "way ahead of her time."
