= Academy Scientific and Technical Award =

Film industry honor

The Scientific and Technical Awards in three classifications are given by the Academy of Motion Picture Arts and Sciences (AMPAS). The Awards have been presented since 1931 to recognize original developments resulting in significant improvements in motion picture production and exhibition.

These awards recognize significant milestones in the development of technology for motion pictures and are conferred by vote of the Academy Board of Governors. Potential nominations for awards are investigated by a special committee within the Academy, The Scientific and Technical Awards Committee, which presents a written report and recommendation to the Board of Governors.

Additionally, the Scientific and Technical Award, formerly named the John A. Bonner Medal of Commendation, given "to an individual in recognition of outstanding service service to the motion picture industry", and the Scientific and Technical Lifetime Achievement Award, previously named the Gordon E. Sawyer Award, both also considered honorary awards, are usually also chosen by the Scientific and Technical Awards Committee and conferred at this annual presentation dinner ceremony.

== Classifications ==
Innovations in motion pictures technology are recognized with the following awards:

1. Academy Award of Merit – an Academy statuette (an Oscar).
2. Scientific and Engineering Award – acrylic trophy with an encased small-scale Oscar statue with a description of the achievement engraved on the base (since 2025).
3. Technical Achievement Award – plaque engraved with a description of the achievement.

=== Award of Merit ===
From the 4th Academy Awards in 1931 through the 50th Academy Awards in 1978 the award was originally called the "Class I Scientific and Technical Award." The award is non-competitive. Winners receive an Oscar statuette. As of 2025, 51 achievements have been recognized with an Award of Merit.

Sci-Tech Award of Merit Recipients
| Year | Recipient(s) |
|---|---|
| 1930/1931 (4th) | To Electrical Research Products, Inc., RCA-Photophone, Inc., and RKO Radio Pictures, Inc., for noise reduction recording equipment; To Dupont Film Manufacturing Corp., and Eastman Kodak Company for super-sensitive panchromatic film |
| 1936 (9th) | To Douglas Shearer and the MGM Studio Sound Department "for the development of a practical two-way horn system and a biased Class A push-pull recording system" |
| 1937 (10th) | To Agfa Ansco Corporation for Agfa Supreme and Agfa Ultra Speed pan motion picture negatives |
| 1940 (13th) | To 20th Century-Fox Film Corp. for the design and construction of the 20th Century Silenced Camera, developed by Daniel Clark, Grover Laube, Charles Miller, and Robert W. Stephens |
| 1949 (22nd) | To Eastman Kodak Company "for the development and introduction of an improved safety base motion picture film" |
| 1952 (25th) | To Eastman Kodak Company for the introduction of Eastman color negative and Eastman color print film; To Ansco Film Division of General Aniline and Film Corporation for the introduction of Ansco color negative and Ansco color print film |
| 1953 (26th) | To Professor Henri Chretien and Earl Sponable, Sol Halprin, Lorin Grignon, Herbert Bragg, and Carl Faulkner of 20th Century Fox-Studios "for creating, developing, and engineering the equipment, processes, and techniques known as CinemaScope"; To Fred Waller "for designing and developing the multiple photographic and projection systems which culminated in Cinerama" |
| 1954 (27th) | To Paramount Pictures, Inc., Loren L. Ryder, John R. Bishop, "and all the members of the technical and engineering staff for developing a method of producing and exhibiting motion pictures known as VistaVision" |
| 1955 (28th) | To the National Carbon Co. "for the development and production of a high efficiency yellow flame carbon for motion picture color photography" |
| 1957 (30th) | To the Todd-AO Corp. and Westrex Corp. "for developing a method of producing and exhibiting wide-film motion pictures known as the Todd-AO system"; To the Motion Picture Research Council "for the design and development of a high efficiency projection screen for drive-in theaters" |
| 1964 (37th) | To Petro Vlahos, Wadsworth E. Pohl, and Ub Iwerks "for the conception and perfection of techniques for Color Traveling Matte Composite Cinematography" |
| 1968 (41st) | To Philip V. Palmquist of Minnesota Mining and Manufacture Co., to Herbert Meyer of the Motion Picture and Television Research Center, and to Charles D. Staffell of the Rank Organization "for the development of a successful embodiment of the reflex background projection system for composite cinematography"; To Eastman Kodak Company "for the development and introduction of a color reversal intermediate film for motion pictures" |
| 1977 (50th) | To Garrett Brown and the Cinema Products Corporation Engineering Staff "under the supervision of John Jurgens for the invention and development of Steadicam" |
| 1978 (51st) | To Eastman Kodak Company "for the research and development of a Duplicating Color Film for motion pictures"; To Stefan Kudelski of Nagra Magnetic Recorders, Incorporated, "for the continuing research, design, and development of the Nagra Production Sound Recorder for Motion Pictures"; To Panavision, Incorporated, "and its engineering staff under the direction of Robert E. Gottschalk, for the concept, design, and continuous development of the Panaflex Motion Picture Camera System" |
| 1979 (52nd) | To Mark Serrurier "for the progressive development of the Moviola from the 1924 invention of his father, Iwan Serrurier, to the present Series 20 sophisticated film editing equipment" |
| 1980 (53rd) | To Linwood G. Dunn, Cecil D. Love, and AcmeTool and Manufacturing Company "for the concept, engineering, and development of the Acme-Dunn Optical Printer for motion picture special effects" |
| 1981 (54th) | To Fuji Film Photo Company, Ltd. "for the research, development, and introduction of a new Ultra-high-speed color negative film for motion pictures" |
| 1982 (55th) | To August Arnold and Erich Kastner of Arnold & Richter, GmbH, "for the concept and engineering of the first operation 35mm, hand-held, spinning-mirror reflex, motion picture camera" |
| 1983 (56th) | To Kurt Larche of Osram GmbH "for the research and development of xenon short-arc discharge lamps for motion picture projection" |
| 1987 (60th) | To Bernard Kuhl, and Werner Block, and to the Osram GmbH Research and Development Department "for the invention and continuing improvement of the Osram HMI light source for motion picture photography" |
| 1988 (61st) | To Ray Dolby and Ioan Allen of Dolby Laboratories Incorporated "for their continuous contributions to motion picture sound through the research and development programs of Dolby Laboratories" |
| 1990 (63rd) | To Eastman Kodak Company "for the development of T-Grain technology and the introduction of EXR color negative films which utilize this technology" |
| 1992 (65th) | To Chadwell O’Connor of the O'Connor Engineering Laboratories "for the concept and engineering of the fluid-damped camera head for motion picture photography" |
| 1993 (66th) | To Panavision for the Auto Panatar anamorphic photographic lens; To Manfred G. Michelson of Technical Film Systems, Incorporated, "for the design and development of the first sprocket-driven film transport system for color print film processors which permits transport speeds in excess of 600 feet per minute" |
| 1994 (67th) | To Petro Vlahos and Paul Vlahos "for the conception and development of the Ultimatte Electronic Blue Screen Compositing Process for motion pictures; To the Eastman Kodak Company for the development of the Eastman EXR Color Intermediate Film 5244" |
| 1996 (69th) | To IMAX Corporation "for the method of filming and exhibiting high-fidelity, large-format, wide-angle motion pictures" |
| 1997 (70th) | To Gunnar P. Michelson "for the engineering and development of an improved, electronic, high-speed, precision light valve for use in motion picture printing machines" |
| 1998 (71st) | To Avid Technology, Inc., "for the concept, system design, and engineering of the Avid Film Composer for motion picture editing" |
| 2000 (73rd) | To Rob Cook, Loren Carpenter, and Ed Catmull "for their significant advancements to the field of motion picture rendering exemplified in Pixar’s Renderman" |
| 2002 (75th) | To Alias/Wavefront "for the development of a 3D animation, dynamics, modeling, and rendering production tool known as Maya"; To Arnold & Richter Cine Technik and Panavision, Inc., "for their continuing development and innovation in the design and manufacturing of advanced camera systems specifically designed for the motion picture entertainment industry" |
| 2003 (76th) | To Digidesign "for the design, development, and implementation of the ProTools digital audio workstation"; To Bill Tondreau of Kuper Controls "for his significant advancements in the field of motion picture control technology for motion picture visual effects" |
| 2004 (77th) | To Horst Burbulla "for the invention and continuing development of the Technocrane telescoping camera crane"; To Jean-Marie Lavalou, Alain Masseron, and David Samuelson "for the engineering and development of the Louma Camera Crane and remote system for motion picture production" |
| 2007 (80th) | To the Eastman Kodak Company "for the development of photographic emulsion technologies incorporated into the Kodak Vision2 family of color negative films" |
| 2011 (84th) | To Franz Kraus. Johannes Steurer, and Wolfgang Riedel "for the design and development of the ARRILASER film recorder" |
| 2012 (85th) | To Cooke Optics Limited "for their continuing innovation in the design, development and manufacture of advanced camera lenses that have helped define the look of motion pictures over the last century." |
| 2013 (86th) | To all those who built and operated film laboratories, "for over a century of service to the motion picture industry" |
| 2014 (87th) | To Larry Hornbeck "for the invention of digital micromirror technology as used in DLP cinema projection" |
| 2017 (90th) | To Mark Elendt and SideFX Software for the creation and development of the Houdini visual effects and animation system |
| 2022 (95th) | To Iain Neil for his lens designs which have had lasting impact in motion picture cinematography; To Ryan Laney for his adaptation and deployment of AI-driven facial veiling technology used to protect the identities while preserving the visual relatability of subjects in documentary filmmaking as exemplified in Welcome to Chechnya (2020). |
| 2024 (97th) | Acknowledging those who have developed and supported film captioning technology, including open and closed. |

=== Scientific and Engineering Award ===
The Scientific and Engineering Award is given for scientific achievements that produce a definite influence on the advancement of the motion picture industry. Achievements need not have been developed and introduced during the award year.

Scientific and Engineering Award Recipients
| Year | Recipient(s) |
|---|---|
| 1983 (56th) | To Jonathan Erland and Roger Dorney of Apogee, Incorporated, for the engineering and development of a reverse bluescreen traveling matte process for special effects photography. |
| 1984 (57th) | To Donald Trumbull, Jonathan Erland, Stephen Fog and Paul Burk of Apogee, Incorporated, for the design and development of the "Blue Max" high-power, blue-flux projector for traveling matte composite photography.; To Jonathan Erland and Robert Bealmer of Apogee, Incorporated, for an innovative design for front projection screens and an improved method for their construction. |
| 1985 (58th) | To IMAX Systems Corporation for a method of filming and exhibiting high-fidelity, large-format, wide-angle motion pictures.; To Ernst Nettmann of E.F. Nettmann & Associates for the invention, and to Edward Phillips and Carlos DeMattos of Matthews Studio Equipment, Inc. for the development, of the Cam-Remote for motion picture photography.; To Myron Gordin, Joe P. Crookham, Jim Drost and David Crookham of Musco Mobile Lighting, Ltd., for the invention of a method of transporting adjustable, high-intensity luminaires and their application to the motion picture industry. |
| 1986 (59th) | To William L. Fredrick and Hal Needham for the design and development of the Shotmaker Elite camera car and crane. |
| 2005 (78th) | To Anatoliy Kokush for the concept and development of the Cascade series of motion picture cranes.; To Anatoliy Kokush, Yuriy Popovsky, Oleksiy Zolotarov for the concept and development of the Russian Arm gyro-stabilized camera crane and the Flight Head.; To David Baraff, Michael Kass, Andy Witkin for "their pioneering work in physically based computer-generated techniques used to simulate realistic cloth in motion pictures."; To Garrett Brown for the original concept of the Skycam flying camera system - the first use of 3D volumetric cable technology for motion picture cinematography.; To Laurie Frost, Peter Hannan for the development of the remote camera head known as the Hot-Head.; To David Grober, for the concept and mechanical design of the Perfect Horizon camera stabilization head.; To Scott Lewallen, for the electronic and software design of the Perfect Horizon camera stabilization head. |
| 2017 (90th) | to John Coyle, Brad Hurndell, Vikas Sathaye and Shane Buckham for work on the Shotover K1 camera platform; to Jeff Lait, Mark Tucker, Cristin Barghiel and John Lynch for work on Houdini; to Bill Spitzak and Jonathan Egstad; and Abigail Brady, Jon Wadelton and Jerry Huxtable for work on Nuke; to Leonard Chapman, Stanislav Gorbatov, David Gasparian and Souhail Issa for work on the Hydrascope crane system |
| 2018 (91st) | to David Simons, Daniel Wilk, James Acquavella, Michael Natkin and David M. Cotter for work on Adobe After Effects; to Thomas Knoll and John Knoll and Mark Hamburg for work on Adobe Photoshop; to Edwin Catmull, Tony deRose and Jos Stam for work on 3D geometric primitives |
| 2019 | —N/a |
| 2020 (93rd) | to Zvi Reznic, Meir Feder, Guy Dorman and Ron Yogev, for work on the Amimon wireless chipset; to Nicolaas Verheem, Greg Smokler and Ilya Issenin, for work on the Teradek Bolt remote monitoring system; to Alexey Lukin and workers at iZotope for work on RX; to Jeff Bloom, Guy McNally and Nick Rose, and John Ellwood and Jonathan Newland for work on various tools used with ADR; to Sanken for the Sanken COS-11 microphones |
| 2021 | —N/a |
| 2022 (95th) | To Larry Barton "for the pioneering design, development and engineering, and to Ben Wilcox for the electronic engineering and software development, of the Cinematography Electronics CineTape."; To Howard Preston "for the concept, design and engineering, and to Bernie Butler-Smith for the design and implementation of electronic circuitry and software, of the Preston Cinema Systems Light Ranger 2." |
| 2023 (96th) | To Charles Q. Robinson, Nicolas Tsingos, Christophe Chabanne, Mark Vinton "and the team of software, hardware and implementation engineers of the Cinema Audio Group at Dolby Laboratories for the creation of the Dolby Atmos Cinema Sound System."; To Steve Read and Barry Silverstein "for their contributions to the design and development of the IMAX Prismless Laser Projector."; To Peter Janssens, Goran Stojmenovik and Wouter D’Oosterlinck "for the design and development of the Barco RGB Laser Projector."; To Michael Perkins, Gerwin Damberg, Trevor Davies and Martin J. Richards "for the design and development of the Christie E3LH Dolby Vision Cinema Projection System, implemented in collaboration between Dolby Cinema and Christie Digital engineering teams."; To Ken Museth, Peter Cucka and Mihai Aldén "for the creation of OpenVDB and its ongoing impact within the motion picture industry.; To Jaden Oh for the concept and development of the Marvelous Designer clothing creation system.; To F. Sebastian Grassia, Alex Mohr, Sunya Boonyatera, Brett Levin and Jeremy Cowles for the design and engineering of Pixar’s Universal Scene Description (USD)." |
| 2024 (97th) | To Jayson Dumenigo for the development of the Action Factory Hydrogels.; To Thijs Vogels, Fabrice Rousselle, David Adler, Gerhard Röthlin and Mark Meyer for the creation of Disney’s ML Denoiser.; To Nir Averbuch, Yair Chuchem and Dan Raviv "for the concept, design and development of the Auto Align Post 2."; To Steve Wagner for the initial concept and software, to Garrett Brown "for the design, and to Jerry Holway and Robert Orf for the engineering of the Steadicam Volt stabilization system."; To Curt O. Schaller for the concept, design and development of the ARRI TRINITY 2 system and to Roman Foltyn for the software and hardware design of its motorized stabilized head; To Dave Freeth for the design, engineering and development of the hand-held Stabileye three-axis motorized camera stabilization system. |
| 2025 (98th) | To Jamie Caliri and Dyami Caliri for "the design, engineering and continuing development of the Dragonframe software suite." |

=== Technical Achievement Award ===
The Technical Achievement Award is an annual achievement recognized for contribution to the progress of the motion picture arts and sciences. Honorees receive an engraved plaque detailing their achievement at the Scientific and Technical Award ceremony.

Technical Achievement Award Recipients
| 2017 (90th) | to Jason Smith and Jeff White, and Rachel Rose and Mike Jutan for work on rigging at Industrial Light & Magic; to Joe Mancewicz, Matt Derksen and Hans Rijpkema for work on rigging at Rhythm & Hues; to Alex Powell, Jason Reisig, Martin Watt and Alex Wells for work on a character animation system at DreamWorks Animation; to Rob Jensen, Thomas Hahn, George ElKoura, Adam Woodbury and Dirk Van Gelder for work on the Presto Animation System at Pixar |
| 2018 (91st) | to Eric Dachs, Erik Bielefeldt, Craig Wood and Paul McReynolds for work on PIX System; to Per-Anders Arvid Edwards for work on "the MoGraph toolset in Cinema 4D"; to Paul Thomas Miller and Marco Paolini for work on Silhouette; to Paul Debevec, Timothy Hawkins and Wan-Chun Ma for "the invention of the Polarized Spherical Gradient Illumination facial appearance capture method" and Xueming Yu for the design and engineering of the Light Stage X capture system"; to Thabo Beeler, Derek Bradley, Bernd Bickel and Markus Gross for work on facial motion capture; to Charles Teorell Loop for his thesis Smooth Subdivision Surfaces Based on Triangles and subsequent theoretical work |
| 2019 | —N/a |
| 2020 (93rd) | to Masato Nakashima, Koichi Ueno, Junji Sakuda and Junro Yonemitsu for work on auto-calibrating monitors at Eizo; to Alejandro Arango, Gary Martinez, Robert Derry and Glenn Derr; Babak Beheshti and Scott Robitille, and Ian Kelly and Dejan Momcilovic for work on systems used in facial capture; to Sven Woop, Carsten Benthin, Attila T. Áfra and Manfred Ernst; and Ingo Wald for work on at Intel's Embree; to Hayley Iben, Mark Meyer, John Anderson and Andrew Witkin, Stephen Bowline, Kelly Ward Hammel, Aleka McAdams, Toby Jones, Maryann Simmons and Andy Milne for work on various systems involved in hair simulation; to Jens-Jørn Stokholm and Ole Moesmann; and Chris Countryman and Omer T. Inan for work on lavalier microphones; to Fredrik Limsäter, Björn Rydahl and Mattias Lagergren for work on ftrack Studio; to Don Parker, Matt Daw, Isaac Reuben, Colin Withers and Neil Brandt for work on Autodesk Shotgun |
| 2021 | —N/a |
| 2022 (95th) | To Howard Jensen and Danny Cangemi "for the concept and creation, and to John Frazier for the development, of the 60- and 100-foot Rain Bars."; To Mark Hills and Jim Vanns "for the design and engineering of the FQ render farm management system.; To Matt Chambers "for his contributions to modern render farm management system design as exemplified in the scheduling architectures of Cue3 and Plow."; To Sébastien Deguy and Christophe Soum "for the concept and original implementation of Substance Engine, and to Sylvain Paris and Nicolas Wirrmann for the design and engineering of Substance Designer."; To David Eberle, Theodore Kim, Fernando de Goes and Audrey Wong "for the design and development of the Fizt2 elastic simulation system." |
| 2023 (96th) | To Bill Beck "for his pioneering utilization of semiconductor lasers for theatrical laser projection systems."; To Gregory T. Niven "for his pioneering work in using laser diodes for theatrical laser projection systems."; To Yoshitaka Nakatsu, Yoji Nagao, Tsuyoshi Hirao, Tomonori Morizumi and Kazuma Kozuru "for their development of laser diodes for theatrical laser projection systems."; To Arnold Peterson and Elia P. Popov "for their ongoing design and engineering, and to John Frazier for the initial concept of the Blind Driver Roof Pod."; To Jon G. Belyeu "for the design and engineering of Movie Works Cable Cutter devices.; To James Eggleton and Delwyn Holroyd for the design, implementation and integration of the High-Density Encoding (HDE) lossless compression algorithm within the Codex recording toolset."; To Jeff Lait, Dan Bailey and Nick Avramoussis "for the continued evolution and expansion of the feature set of OpenVDB."; To Oliver Castle and Marcus Schoo "for the design and engineering of Atlas, and to Keith Lackey for the prototype creation and early development of Atlas."; To Lucas Miller, Christopher Jon Horvath, Steve LaVietes and Joe Ardent "for the creation of the Alembic Caching and Interchange system." |
| 2024 (97th) | To Essex Edwards, James Jacobs, Jernej Barbic, Crawford Doran and Andrew van Straten for the design and development of Ziva VFX.; To Javor Kalojanov and Kimball Thurston for the creation of Wētā FX’s ML Denoiser.; To Neeme Vaino for the development of Fireskin360 Naked Burn Gel.; To Dustin Brooks and Colin Decker for the development of naked burn gel.; To Attila T. Áfra "for the creation of Intel Open Image Denoise, and to Timo Aila for his pioneering work at NVIDIA applying U-Nets to denoising."; To Mark Noel "for adapting and enhancing the safety and reliability of transportable six-degrees-of-freedom motion base technology for motion picture use."; To Su Tie for the development of the sensor analysis and stabilization software, to Bei Shimeng "for the electrical engineering, and to Zhao Yanchong for the mechanical design and engineering of the Ronin 2 gimbal system."; To Tabb Firchau "for the conception and development, to John Ellison and Steve Webb for the attitude control system, to David Bloomfield for the motor design, and to Shane Colton for the motor driver system design of the Mōvi gimbals." |
| 2025 (98th) | Brent Bell, Josef Köhler and Ian Medwell for various work on development of "small lead-free pyrotechnic devices"; Andrea Weidlich and Luca Fascione for work on layered materials at Wētā FX; Vincent Dedun and Emmanuel Turqin and Jonathan Moulin, for work on Lama at ILM; Josh Bainbridge and Nathan Walster for work on a "layered shading system at Framestore"; Bret St. Clair and Marc-Andre Davignon for "the design and engineering of the suite of brushing and patching tools", and Pav Grochola and Edmond Boulet-Gilly for "the design and engineering of the Superdraw and Kismet linework tools" (used for example on Spider-Man: Into the Spider-Verse); Baptiste Van Opstal, Jeff Budsberg, Michael Losure, Jon Lanz and Eszter Offertaler for "their contributions to the stylized animation toolset at DreamWorks Animation"; Benjamin Graf, for work on dxRevive Pro; John Ellwood and Jeff Bloom for work on "the Titan auto-assembly software for digital audio"; Marc Specter for work on the Kraken Dialogue Editors Toolkit; Justin Webster for work on "Matchbox, a system for audio and video matching that enables auto-reconform"; Paul Debevec for "his pioneering work in high dynamic range, image-based lighting techniques" |

== See also ==
- Gordon E. Sawyer Award
- List of engineering awards
