= Fiber simulation =

Branch of mechanics that deals with modeling the dynamics and rheology of fibers

Fiber simulation is a branch of mechanics that deals with modeling the dynamics and rheology of fibers, i.e. particles of large aspect ratio length to diameter. Fiber simulations are used to gain a better understanding of production processes including fibers (textile and paper industry), biological systems or computer graphics.

== Modeling fibers ==
Many of the models used to simulate fibers were developed by researchers in the field of rheology. Rheologically speaking fiber suspensions are non-Newtonian fluids, and can display normal stress differences.

== Simulation techniques ==
Early fiber simulations employed particles which were rigid rods or prolate spheroids, whose equations of motion have analytical solutions. More recent models are able to represent flexible fibers. The models rely heavily on continuum mechanics concepts and the numerical methods employed have some similarities to those employed in molecular dynamics, or in dynamics of multi body systems.

The use of computers facilitates greatly the solution of fiber simulation problems. The complexity of the simulations arise from the system having a large number of degrees of freedom, and from the numerous possible interparticle interactions having place, such as friction, hydrodynamic interactions, and other kinds of interparticle forces such as colloidal forces that exert attractive or repulsive forces.
