= Chakraborty =

Surname list

Origin
- Origin: Bengali Hindu
- Region of origin: Bengal

Chakraborty (spelling variations include Chakraborti, Chakrabarti, Chakravarty, Chakravorty, Chakravarti, Chakrabartty and Chakrabarty) is a surname used by Bengali Hindus and Assamese Hindus of India and Bangladesh, as well as by some communities of southern India. It literally means 'wheels rolling'; metaphorically it denotes a ruler whose chariot wheels roll everywhere without obstruction (čakra 'wheel' + vart- 'to roll'). The surname is mainly used by people of the Bengali Brahmin and Assamese Brahmin communities in Bangladesh and the Indian states of West Bengal, Tripura and Assam. The surname is also used by the Jains of southern India.

== Notable persons with this surname ==
=== Male ===
- Abani Chakravarty (1941–1994?), Indian Assamese poet
- Ajay Chakraborty (born 1943), Indian politician
- Ajoy Chakrabarty (born 1953), Indian singer
- Akinchan Chakrabarty (18th century), Bengali poet
- Amal Chakraborty, Indian paediatric surgeon
- Ambika Chakrabarty (1892–1962), Indian Bengali independence movement activist and revolutionary
- Amiya Chakravarty (1901–1986), literary critic, academic, and Bengali poet
- Amiya Chakravarty (director) (1912–1957), Indian film director, screenwriter and producer
- Ananda Mohan Chakrabarty (1938–2020), Indian microbiologist, party to the U.S. Supreme Court case Diamond v. Chakrabarty
- Animesh Chakravorty (born 1935), Indian chemist
- Aravinda Chakravarti (born 1954), Indian geneticist
- Arindam Chakrabarti, Indian philosopher working in Hawaii
- Arjun Chakrabarty (born 1990), Indian actor
- Arnab Chakrabarty (born 1980), Indian musician and Sarod player
- Arup Chakraborty (born 1961), American engineer
- Bicky Chakraborty (1943–2022), Swedish hotel mogul
- Bikas K Chakrabarti (born 1952), Indian physicist
- Birendra Narayan Chakraborty (1904–1976), Indian politician
- Bonnie Chakraborty, Bengali singer
- Byomkes Chakrabarti (1923–1981), Indian linguist
- Chiranjeet Chakraborty (born 1960), Indian Bengali film actor
- Dhirendra Kishore Chakravarti (1902 – after 1982), Indian geologist and palaeontologist
- Dilip Kumar Chakrabarti (born 1941), Indian archaeologist
- Dipesh Chakrabarty (born 1948), Indian historian
- Gaurav Chakrabarty (born 1987), Indian actor
- George Chakravarthi (born 1969), British-Indian artist
- Ghanaram Chakrabarty (c. 1669-?), Bengali poet
- Haranath Chakraborty (born 1959), Indian Bengali film director
- J. D. Chakravarthy (born 1970), Indian film actor and director in Telugu cinema and Bollywood
- Janardan Chakravarti (1901–1987), Indian professor of Bengali
- K. Chakravarthy (1936–2002), music director in the South Indian film industry
- Keshab Chakravarthy (active 1925), Indian revolutionary
- Khelaram Chakrabarty (16th century), Bengali poet
- Kshitindra Mohan Chakravarty (1900–1988), Indian chemist, fuel technician and teacher
- Kushal Chakraborty (born 1968), Bengali actor and film director
- M. C. Chakrabarti (died 1972), Indian statistician
- Mahaakshay Chakraborty (born 1984), Indian actor
- Manoj Chakraborty (born 1954), Indian politician
- Mithun Chakraborty (born 1950), Indian actor, director and businessman
- Nachiketa Chakraborty (born 1965), Indian Bengali singer-songwriter
- Nirendranath Chakravarty (1924–2018), Bengali poet
- Nripen Chakraborty (1905–2004), Indian politician
- Oliphant Chuckerbutty (1884–1960), English composer and organist of Anglo-Indian descent
- Panchanan Chakraborty (1900–1995), Indian revolutionary
- Phani Bhusan Chakravartti (1898–1981), first Indian Bengali permanent Chief Justice of the Calcutta High Court
- Pramod Chakravorty (1929–2004), Indian film director and producer
- Praveen Chakravarty (born 1973), Indian businessman
- Pritam Chakraborty (born 1971), Indian Bengali music director and composer
- Pritish Chakraborty (born 1984), Indian film actor, director, writer, producer, singer in Bollywood
- Rahi Chakraborty (born 1988), Indian singer, songwriter, programmer and guitarist
- Raj Chakraborty (born 1975), Indian Bengali film director
- Rajorshi Chakraborti (born 1977), Indian writer in English
- Ranajit Chakraborty (1946–2018), Indian geneticist
- Ritwick Chakraborty (born 1977), Indian film actor
- Rupram Chakrabarty (17th century), Bengali poet
- S. S. Chakravarthy (died 2023), Indian Tamil film producer
- Sabyasachi Chakrabarty (born 1956), Indian Bengali TV and film actor
- Saikat Chakrabarti (born 1986), American computer programmer, entrepreneur, and political activist
- Samiran Chandra Chakrabarti, Indian Indologist and scholar of onomastics & Vedic studies
- Samrat Chakrabarti (born 1975), British-American actor and musician
- Sandip Chakrabarti (born 1958), Indian astrophysicist
- Sankar Chakraborti (born 1970), Indian business leader
- Shibram Chakraborty (1903–1980), Bengali writer, humorist and revolutionary
- Shibu Chakravarthy (born 1961), Indian lyricist, screenplay and script writer who mainly works in Malayalam cinema
- Shyam Sundar Chakravarthy (1869–1932), Bengali revolutionary, independence activist and journalist
- Snehasish Chakraborty (born 1989), Indian footballer
- Soham Chakraborty (born 1984), Indian actor, producer, and politician
- Soorjo Coomar Goodeve Chuckerbutty (c. 1826–1874), one of the earliest Indians to practice modern medicine
- Souvik Chakraborty (born 1991), Indian footballer
- Subhas Chakraborty (died 2009), Indian politician, transport minister of West Bengal
- Sugato Chakravarty, Indian marketing academic
- Sujan Chakraborty (born 1959), Indian politician
- Sujit Chakraborty (born 1968) West Bengal politician from Barjora
- Suma Chakrabarti (born 1959), British civil servant, President of the European Bank for Reconstruction and Development
- Sumon K Chakrabarti, Indian journalist
- Supriyo Chakraborty, (born 1995), Indian cricketer
- Swadesh Chakraborty (1943–2024), Indian politician
- Swapan Kumar Chakravorty (1954–2021), Director General of the National Library of India, Kolkata
- Trailokyanath Chakravarty (1889–1970), British Indian revolutionary, East Pakistani politician
- Tulsi Chakraborty (1899–1961), Indian comic actor
- Utpalendu Chakrabarty (1948–2024), Indian film director
- Varun Chakravarthy (born 1991), Indian cricketer
- Vijay C Chakravarthy, Indian cinematographer
- Vinu Chakravarthy (1945–2017), Tamil actor, scriptwriter and director
- Visvanatha Chakravarti (1626? – 1708?), Bengali guru

=== Female ===
- Bijoya Chakravarty (born 1939), Indian politician from Assam
- Dia Chakravarty (born 1984), Bangladeshi-born British political activist and singer
- Gayatri Chakravorty Spivak (born 1942), Indian literary critic
- Ipsita Roy Chakraverti (born 1950), Indian Wiccan priestess
- Jaya Chakrabarti (born 1973), British public figure and scientist
- Kaushiki Chakrabarty (born 1980), Indian classical vocalist
- Lolita Chakrabarti (born 1969), British actor and writer
- Megha Chakraborty, Indian actress
- Meghna Chakrabarti, American radio personality
- Mimi Chakraborty (born 1989), Bengali film actress, singer and a (nominal) Member of Parliament
- Reeta Chakrabarti (born 1964), British television journalist
- Rhea Chakraborty (born 1992), Indian video jockey and actress
- Ritabhari Chakraborty (born 1992), Indian Bengali film actor
- Rushmi Chakravarthi (born 1977), Indian tennis player
- S. A. Chakraborty (born 1985), American fantasy novelist
- Shami Chakrabarti (born 1969), British member of the House of Lords, barrister and civil liberties campaigner
- Sharmila Chakraborty (born 1961), Indian cricketer
- Sumona Chakravarti (born 1988), Bollywood actress and celebrity
- Uthpala Chakraborty, Indian cricketer

== See also ==
- Chakrabarti Inquiry, British Labour Party inquiry into allegations of antisemitism
- Chakravartin, an ancient Indian term used to refer to an ideal universal ruler
- Chakravartin Ashoka Samrat, a 2015 Indian historical drama TV series
- Ravi Chakrabarti, fictional character from the American supernatural procedural drama series iZombie (2015-2019)
