= Chakrabarty =

Chakrabarty is a surname. Notable people with the surname include:

- Ajit Chakrabarty, music composer and music educationalist
- Ajoy Chakrabarty (born 1953), Indian Hindustani classical vocalist
- Akinchan Chakrabarty (c. 18th century), Bengali poet
- Ambika Chakrabarty (1892–1962), Indian Bengali independence movement activist and revolutionary
- Ananda Mohan Chakrabarty (1938–2020), Ph.D., Indian American microbiologist, scientist, and researcher
- Arnab Chakrabarty (born 1980), Hindustani classical musician and sarod player
- Dipesh Chakrabarty, Bengali historian, contributor to postcolonial theory and subaltern studies
- Gaurav Chakrabarty, Indian actor, played Prodipto Lahiri in the Bengali megaserial Gaaner Oparey
- Ghanaram Chakrabarty (born c. 1669), Bengali poet, contributor to the Dharmamangalkavya tradition
- Kaushiki Chakrabarty (born 1980), Indian classical vocalist
- Khelaram Chakrabarty (c. 16th century), Bengali poet, early poet of Dharmamangalkavya tradition
- Mithun Chakrabarty (born 1950), Indian film actor, social activist, entrepreneur
- Rupram Chakrabarty (c. 17th century) Bengali poet, contributor to Dharmamangalkavya tradition
- Subhas Chakrabarty (1942–2009), leader in the Communist Party of India (Marxist)
- Namita Chakrabarty activist surrounding critical race theory in England.

== See also ==
- Diamond v. Chakrabarty, 447 U.S. 303 (1980), United States Supreme Court case dealing with whether genetically modified organisms can be patented
- Chakraborty
- Chakravarti/Chakravartin
