= Ramdas Adak =

Seventeenth century Bengali poet

Ramdas Adak (Bengali: রামদাস আদক; c. 1635–1708) was a 17th-century Bengali and Sanskrit court poet and song composer. He composed a Dharmamangal kavya named Anadimangal. He was one of the most significant poets of the Dharmamangal Kavya. He was the only "non-Brahmin" poet of Dharmamangal. He was one of the earliest known composers of the Dharmamangal Kavya. He was the "Swavakobi" of Raja Pratapnarayan of Bhurishrestha.

== Early life and folk stories ==
He was born in 1635 in a Dakshin-Rarhiya Mahishya family at village Hayatpur under Arambagh subdivision of the Bhursut Kingdom in present-day Hooghly district. After his father's death he settled in a village called Paschimpara in modern-day Bardhaman district. For extreme poverty after his father's untimely death, he was unable to pay taxes and imprisoned by Chaitanya Samanta, an official of Raja Pratapnarayan, the Maharaja of Bhursut, and the son of Raja Rudranarayan and Bhavashankari, after few days an old man in disguise secretly freed Ramdas from the prison.

ভূরসুত রাজা রায় প্রতাপনারাণ।

দানে কল্পতরু তূল্য কর্ণের সমান।।

চৈতন্য সামন্ত ছিল গ্রামের মণ্ডল।

মুখে মধু স্বরসুধা অন্তরে গরল।।

— Ramdas Adak, Anadi Mangal

To escape from the king's soldiers, he constantly changed his place of residence. It is said that one day he being chased by a supernatural guard, he became frightened, exhausted, and thirsty. When he went to a pond to drink water, the water miraculously dried up, and he fell unconscious, at that moment, Dharmathakur appeared before him in the guise of a young Brahmin and offered him Ganges water to drink, and restored his consciousness.

ক্ষুধায় তৃষ্ণায় রাম ক্লেশ পাও তুমি।

তোমার লাগিয়া জল আনিয়াছি আমি।।

এত বলি বদনে দিলেন গঙ্গাজল।

আজি হইতে রামদাসের জীবন সফল।।

জলপানে রামদাস জীবন পেলে তুমি।

ধর্মের সঙ্গীত গাও শুনি কিছু আমি।।

— Ramdas Adak, Anadimangal

After regain consciousness, The Brahmin commanded him to sing a devotional songs in praise of Dharma Thakur. Since Ramdas had no knowledge of worship or devotional songs, he humbly described himself as ignorant. Pleased by his humility, Dharmaraj revealed his divine form as Vishnu and granted Ramdas the boon of supreme wisdom and ordered Ramdas to compose Anadimangal and spread the glory of Dharma Thakur.

আজ থেকে রামদাস কবিবর তুমি।

জারগ্রামের কালুরায় ধর্ম হই আমি।।

আসরে জুড়িবে গীত আমা সোঙরণে।

সঙ্গীত কবিতা ভরা ভাসিবে বদনে।।

সুচ্ছন্দবন্ধন গীত সুশ্রাব্য সবার।

শ্রীধর্মমাহাত্ম্য মর্ত্যে হইবে প্রচার।।

— Ramdas Adak, Anadimangal

ভক্তের বাসনা পূর্ন করিবারে হরি। হইলেন শঙ্খচক্রগদাপদ্মধারী।।

— Ramdas Adak, Anadimangal

Ramdas' only son was Balai Chand. His descendants still reside in Paschimpara village.

== Career ==
Alongside composing Anadimangal, Ramdas began singing various devotional songs on Dharmaraj. Within a short time he got the attention of Raja Jadavchandra Roy, the nephew of Raja Pratapnarayan who was deeply impressed by Ramdas's poetic and musical talent. Because of his talent he was appointed as the Swavakavi in Raja Pratapnarayan's royal court, where he completed the composition of Anadimangal Kavya. Raja Naranarayan, after his succession to the throne, also appointed him as the Dewan of Bhurishrestha.

== See also ==
- Dharmamangal
- Yama (Dharmaraj)
