= Samiran =

Samiran or Semiran (Persian: سميران) may refer to:

== Places ==
- A town founded by the Khazars (circa 650–969) after they assumed control of Transcaucasia
- Samiran, Hamadan in Iran
- Semiran, Kurdistan in Iran
- Semiran Castle, historical fortress in Iran's Tarom County

== People ==
- Samiran Nundy, Indian surgeon
- Samiran Chandra Chakrabarti, Indian academic

== Art ==
- Samiran Barua Ahi Ase, Indian film
