= Pratapnarayan =

- Maharaja of Bhurishrestha
- Reign: 1652–1684
- Predecessor: Bhavashankari
- Successor: Naranarayan
- Spouse: Mahendrani
- Issue: Naranarayan
- Father: Rudranarayan
- Mother: Bhavashankari

Maharaja Pratapnarayan (Bengali: মহারাজা প্রতাপনারায়ণ) was the king of Bhurishrestha who patronized literature and art. His mostly peaceful reign was devoted towards the welfare of his subjects. Bhurishrestha once again flourished in arts & culture and trade & commerce.

== Early life ==
Pratapnarayan was the only child of Rudranarayan and Bhavashankari. His father died when he was just five years of age.

== Reign ==
Pratapnarayan's initial task was to unite the houses of Pendo and Dogachhia. These forts were under the command of two branches of the royal family. He acquired much of their estates and reduced some of their powers. Under a new agreement, they were required to pay a fourth of their income as revenue.

By the beginning of the 17th century, Saptagram had lost its importance and Hooghly emerged as the new centre of trade and commerce. The Portuguese traders based in Hooghly had become so much influential that they began to interfere in the external trade of Bhurishrestha. Pratapnarayan, however, didn't allow them trading rights within the kingdom.

During his reign, Lakshman Sinha, an ambitious Sadgop acquired the estate of Bhanjabhum in Medinipurbhukta. But his brother Shyam Sinha conspired with the Pathans, killed his brother and usurped the throne. At that time the grandsons of Lakshman Sinha, namely Chhattu Ray, Raghunath Ray and Durgadas Ray approached Pratapnarayan for help. They enrolled in the armed forces and by their dedication and hard work, rose to high ranks. Then with the help of the army, they recovered their estate from the tyrant Shyam Sinha.

== Welfare ==
He entrusted the daily worship of Rudreshwar (Shiva) with a pandit named Nigamananda Chakravarti, who was selected by the royal priest. An estate of 100 bighas were granted for the upkeep of the temple. Apart from this he granted numerous brahmottar estates to the Brahmins in the present districts of Howrah, Hooghly and Burdwan.

He was also the chief patron of Kavi Ramdas Adak, and granted him land and estates, and patronises the compilation of Dharmamangal Kavya. He appointed, Ramdas as the "Swavakavi" of the royal court of Bhurishrestha.

According to his mother's last wishes, Pratapnarayan established the temple of Kashinath or Vishwanath (Shiva). Later he also established Bhuvaneshwari and Abhaya, both incarnations of Chandi and both according to Tantric traditions. According to Vaishnava tradition he established Gajalakshmi. Later he erected a two-storeyed temple in Rekh Deul style and housed the idols established by the royal family within the sanctum sanctorum of the temple.

He is also credited with starting the annual Durga Puja in the kingdom.

== Arts and culture ==
Pratapnarayan was a patron of art and culture. Bharat Mallik, the 17th century grammarian and commentator used to adorn his court. He composed Ratnaprabha and Chandraprabha. His commentaries include those on Kalidas's Raghuvamsa and Meghaduta. Ramdas Adak composed the epic Anadimangal. Pratapnarayan established a Sanskrit school at Krishnanagar near Khanakul. Later it became a centre for the studies on Nyaya.

== Legacy ==
The village of Pratapnarayanpur in present Howrah district bears the legacy of his peaceful and prosperous rule.

== Notes ==
Pratapnarayan Bharadwaj Dynasty
Regnal titles
Preceded by Bhavashankari	Maharaja of Bhurishrestha	Succeeded by Naranarayan
