= Hinduism in West Bengal =

Largest religion in West Bengal

Hindus in West Bengal

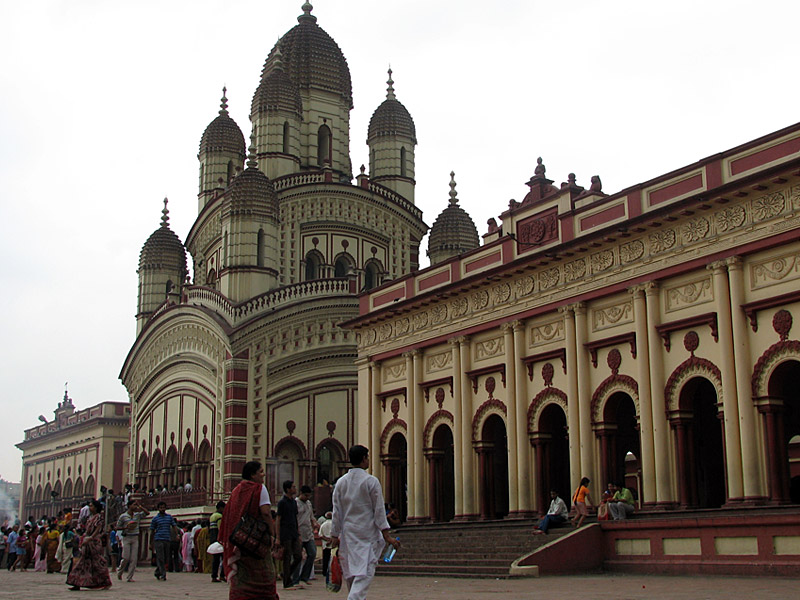
- Dakshineswar Kali Temple in Kolkata

Total population
- c. 64.4 million (2011 Census) ▲ (70.5% of West Bengal's population) ▼ c. 55 million Bengali Hindus

Regions with significant populations
- Majority in all districts except Murshidabad, Uttar Dinajpur and Malda.

Religions
- Hinduism and others

Languages
- Majority: Bengali; Minority: Nepali and Hindi

Hinduism is the largest religious tradition in the Indian state of West Bengal with approximately 70.54% of the population identifying themselves as Hindus (as of 2011). The Hindus in West Bengal mostly belong to the Shakta (the Kalikula tradition), minority to Vaishnavite and a small community belong to Shaivite and other denominations. The vast majority of Hindus in West Bengal are Bengali Hindus numbering around 55 million and comprising 60.2% of the state population of 91.35 million (2011) but a notable section of non-Bengali Hindus also exist, particularly among Marwaris, Biharis, Odias, Gurkhas, Sindhis, Gujaratis and various tribal communities such as Koch, Santals, Munda, Mech people and particularly Adivadis numbering around 9.4 million comprising rest 10.3% of the state population.

Hinduism had existed in the region of Bengal before the 16th century BC and by the 3rd century, Buddhism and Jainism were popular too. Gaur, the first sovereign Hindu kingdom in Bengal with its capital in Karnasubarna in modern-day Murshidabad district, was set up by Shashanka, a Shaivaite king who ruled approximately between 600 AD and 625 AD. The modern structure of Bengali Hindu society was developed during the rule of the Sena dynasty in the 12th century AD. West Bengal has been home to several famous religious teachers, including Sri Chaitanya, Sri Ramakrishna, Rammohan Roy and Swami Vivekananda.

== Culture ==
The language of the Hindus in West Bengal is Bengali. A large number of Hindu religious texts like biographies of Chaitanya Mahaprabhu, Mangal-kavyas, Bratakathas and Panchalis as well as dharmik writings of modern Bengali philosophers and saints have been produced in Bengali for many centuries.

=== Religion ===
Majority of Bengali Hindus follow Shaktism (the Kalikula tradition), minority—Vaishnavism (Gaudiya Vaishnavism, Vaishnava-Sahajiya, Bauls). Shaktas belong to the upper castes as well as lowest castes and tribes, while the lower middle castes are Vaishnavas.

The main devis of the Kalikula tradition are Kali, Chandi which is another form of Durga, Durga, as well as regional goddesses such as Manasa(also known as Bishhori), the snake goddesses, Shashthi, the protectress of children, Shitala, the smallpox goddess, and Umā (the Bengali name for Parvati).

Jagadhatri, Lakshmi and Saraswati, Shiva, Ganesha, Vishwakarma, Krishna, Rama, Jagannath and Vishnu are the other popular and widely worshipped Hindu deities in West Bengal.

Durga Puja is the biggest and most important festival of the Hindus in West Bengal, as well as the most significant festival of the state in general. Kali Puja is the second major festival of the community and it corresponds to the pan-Indian festival of Diwali. Other major festivals include Kojagari Lakshmi Puja, Dolyatra, Jagaddhatri Puja, Rathayatra, Saraswati Puja, Poila Baishakh, Vishwakarma Puja, Gajan, Poush Parban etc.

=== Festivals ===
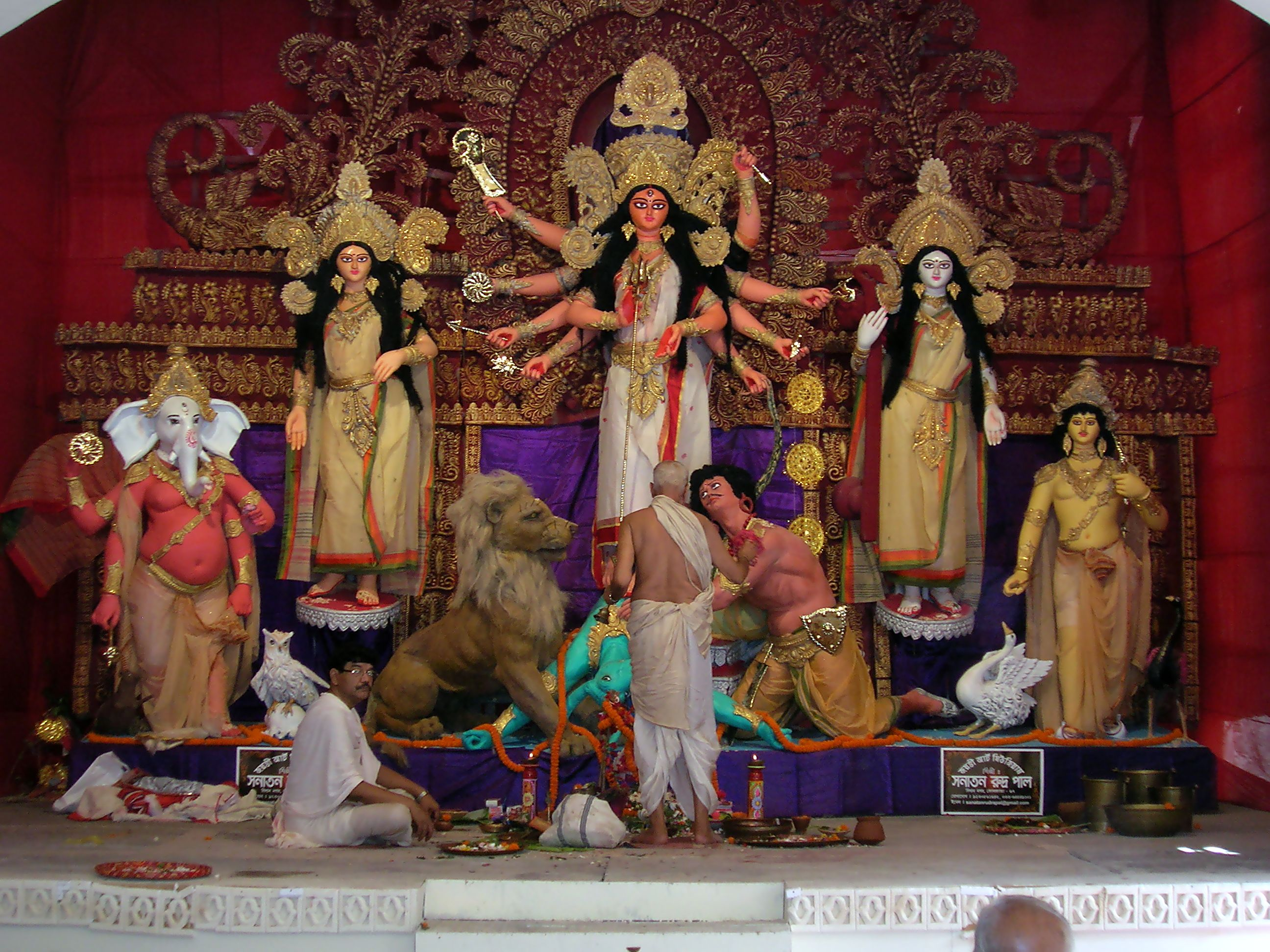
Durga Puja, the biggest festival

Bengali Hindus in West Bengal observe a number of festivals, hence the Bengali proverb Baro Mase Tero Parbon (Bengali: বারো মাসে তেরো পার্বণ, lit. 'twelve months thirteen festivities'). Birth Anniversary of Rabindranath Tagore which is celebrated as one of the major festivals of the state, Rathyatra and Janmashtami before the commencement of the autumnal festival season which starts with Vishwakarma Puja on the last day of Bengali month of Bhadra which is around the middle of September in the English calendar. The annual five-day Durga Puja is the biggest and most widely celebrated Hindu festival in West Bengal. Durga Puja is followed by Kojagari Lakshmi Puja, Kali Puja, Bhai Phonta, Jagaddhatri Puja and Kartik Puja. On 1 January Kalpataru Day is observed as an auspicious day associated with Ramakrishna Paramhansa. The winter solstice is celebrated a Paush Sankranti in mid January, followed by Saraswati Puja. The spring festival of Holi is celebrated in the form of Dolyatra. The year ends with Charak Puja and Gajan.

=== Temples ===
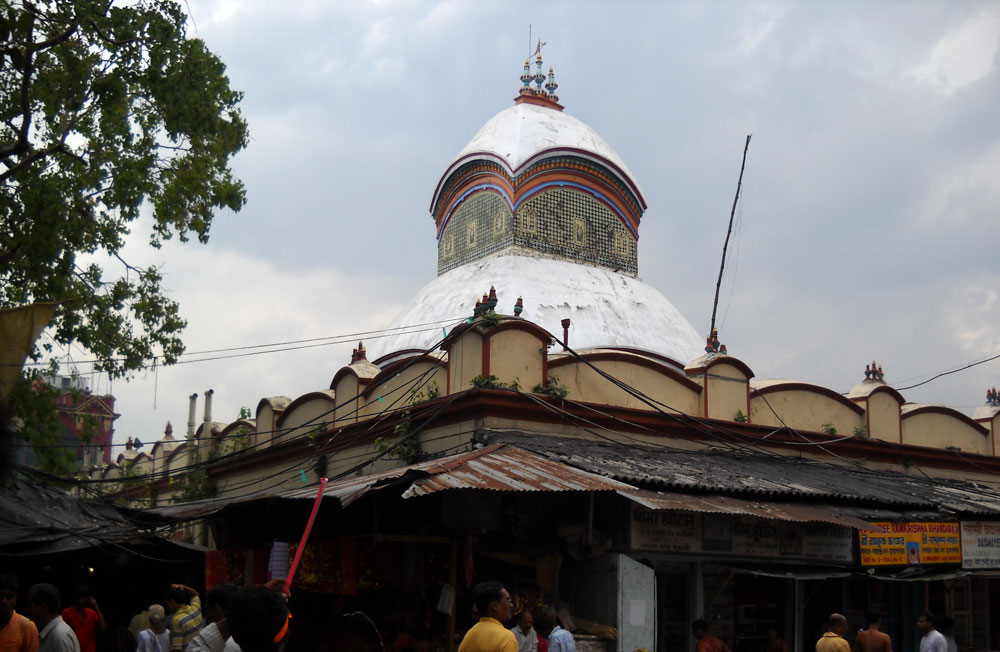
Kalighat Temple.

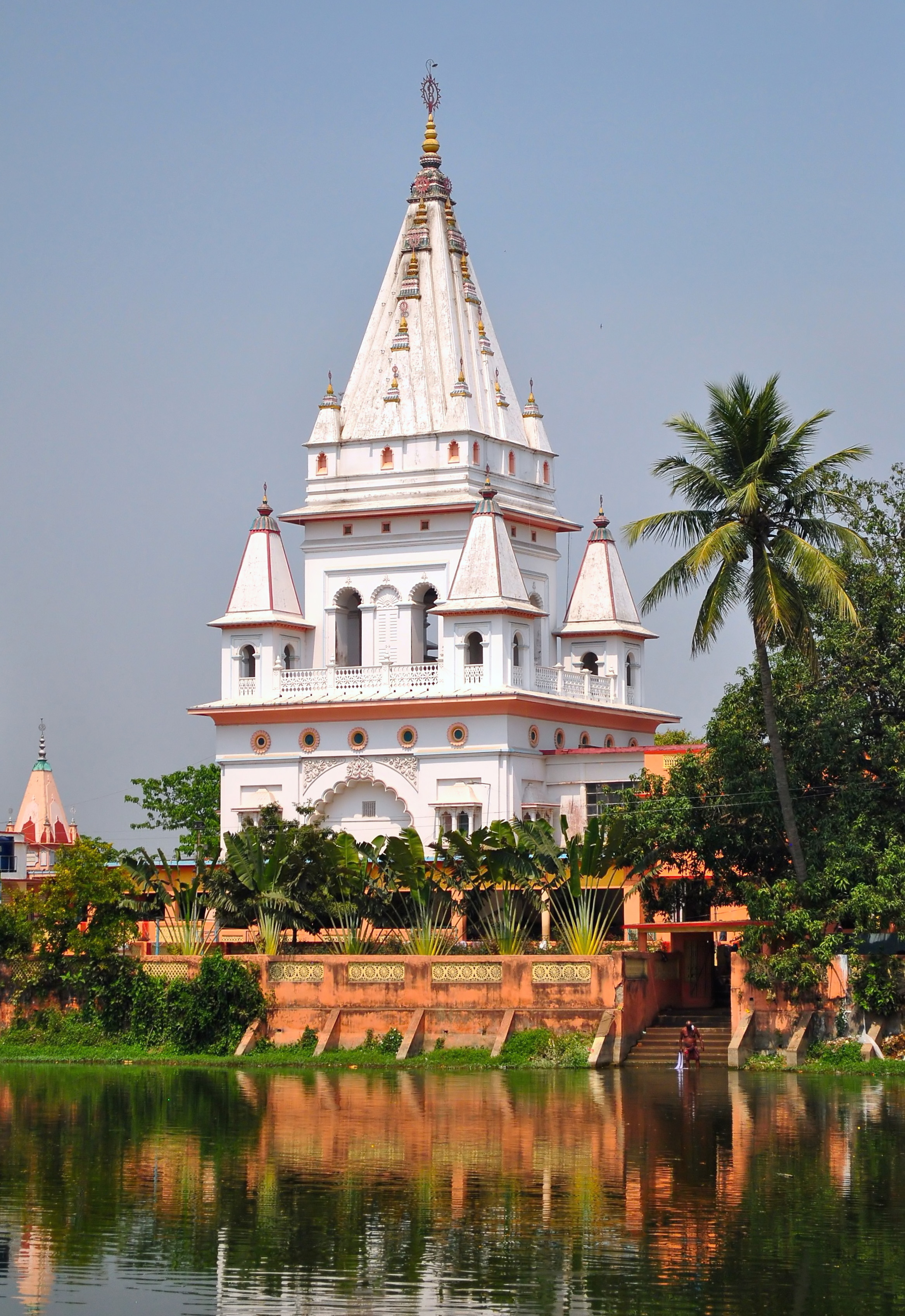
The temple at Caitanya Mahaprabhu's birthplace in Mayapur, Nadia established by Bhaktivinoda Thakur in the 1880s.

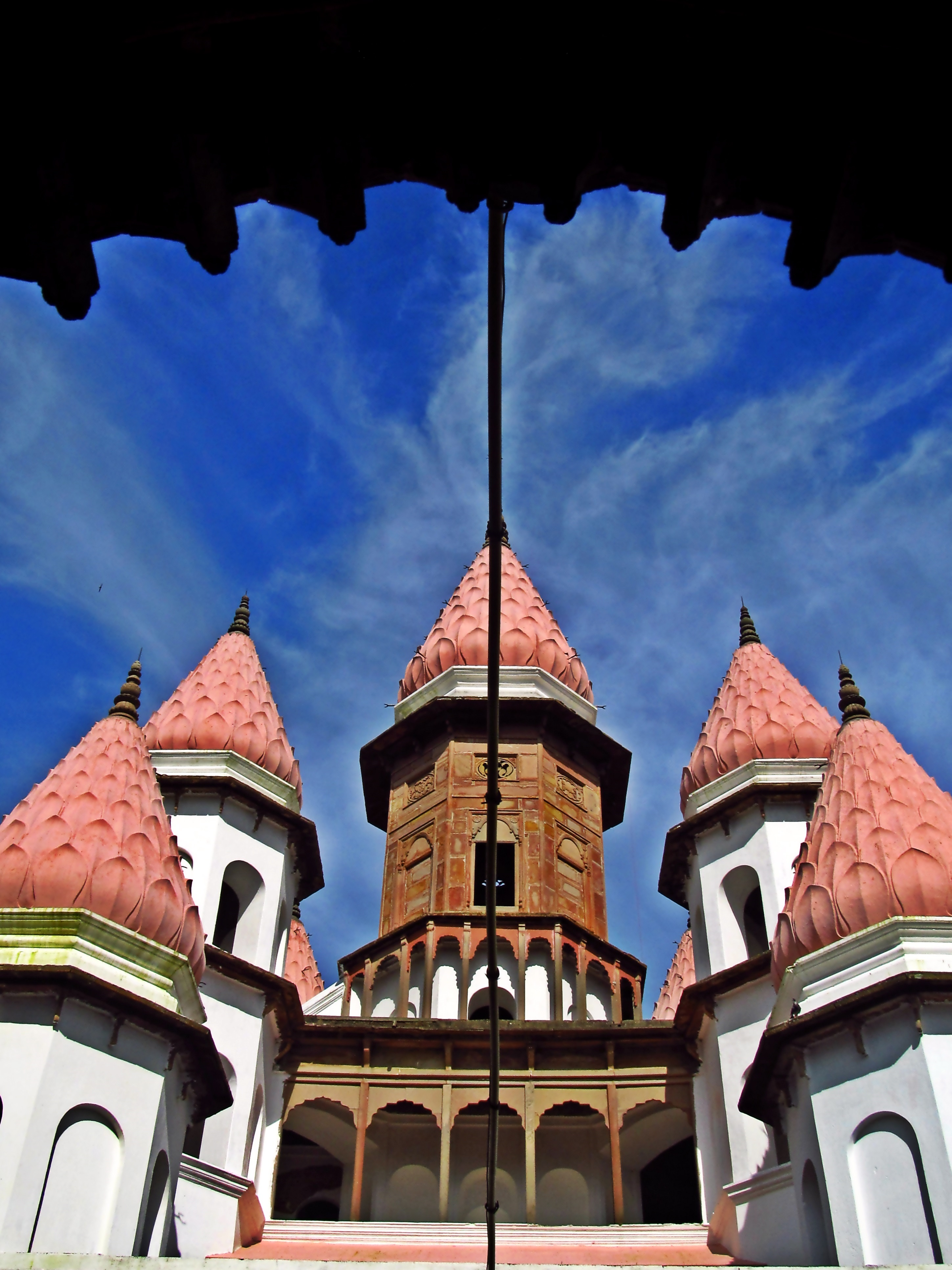
Hangseshwari and Vasudev temple at Hooghly district.

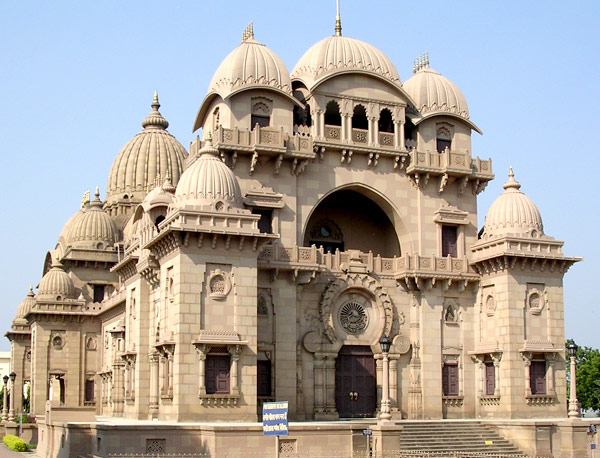
Sri Ramakrishna Temple, Belur Math.

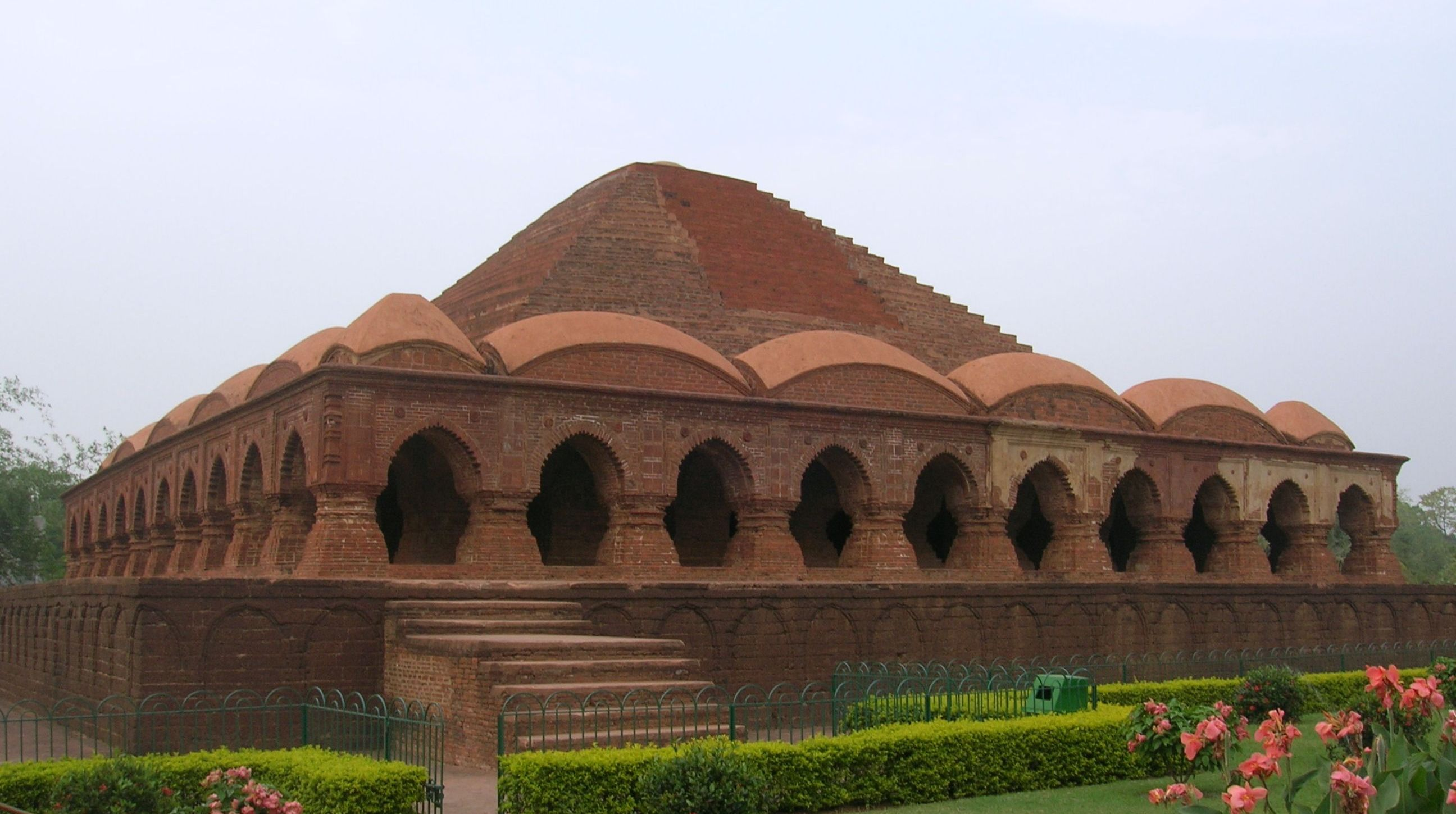
Rashmancha Temple, Bishnupur

Temple architecture in West Bengal architecture has assumed a unique identity and evolved into the Bengali terra cotta temple architecture which is also a very common style of Hindu temples in Bangladesh. Due to lack of suitable stone in the alluvial Gangetic delta, the temple makers had to resort to other materials instead of stone. This gave rise to using terra cotta as a medium for temple construction. Terra-cotta exteriors with rich carvings are a unique feature of Bengali temples. The town of Vishnupur in West Bengal is renowned for this type of architecture. Usually a part of the intended total motif was carved by hand on one side of a brick and then baked. While under construction, these carved bricks were arranged to make up the entire motif.

The Bengali style of temple is not luxurious. Rather, most are modelled on simple thatched-roof earthen huts used as dwellings by commoners. This can be attributed to the popularity of bhakti sects which taught people to view gods as close to themselves. Thus, various styles like do-chala, Jor-bangla Style, char-chala, and aat-chala sprang up. However, there is also a popular style of building known as Navaratna (nine-towered) or Pancharatna (five-towered) in Bengal which is more luxurious than the Chala buildings. A typical example of Navaratna style is the Dakshineswar Kali Temple. The Shiva temples of rural Bengal has significantly impacted on the architectural style of Kalighat Temple, one of the oldest Hindu temples of India. The famous Birla Temple of Kolkata, built in 1996, has a unique blend of temple architecture of Odisha with Rajasthani temple arts. The Mahakal Temple in Darjeeling is a unique and important Hindu temple since 1782.

== Demography ==
Hindus constituted 78.45% of West Bengal's population way back in 1951. As per the 2011 census, 70.54% of the state's population is Hindu. There is sharp decline of 7.91% Hindu population in 6 decades.

Hindus in West Bengal by district (2011)
#	District	Total population	Hindu population	%
1	North 24 Parganas	10,009,781	7,352,769	73.46%
2	Barddhaman	7,717,563	6,008,472	77.85%
3	South 24 Parganas	8,161,961	5,155,545	63.17%
4	Paschim Medinipur	5,913,457	5,056,953	85.52%
5	Hooghly	5,519,145	4,574,569	82.89%
6	Purba Medinipur	5,095,875	4,343,972	85.24%
7	Nadia	5,167,600	3,728,482	72.15%
8	Howrah	4,850,029	3,535,844	72.90%
9	Kolkata	4,496,694	3,440,290	76.51%
10	Jalpaiguri	3,872,846	3,156,781	81.51%
11	Bankura	3,596,674	3,033,581	84.34%
12	Purulia	2,930,115	2,373,120	80.99%
13	Murshidabad	7,103,807	2,359,061	33.21%
14	Birbhum	3,502,404	2,181,515	62.29%
15	Cooch Behar	2,819,086	2,087,766	74.06%
16	Maldah	3,988,845	1,914,352	47.99%
17	Uttar Dinajpur	3,007,134	1,482,943	49.31%
18	Darjeeling	1,846,823	1,366,681	74.00%
19	Dakshin Dinajpur	1,676,276	1,232,850	73.55%
	West Bengal (Total)	91,276,115	64,385,546	70.54%

=== Population growth ===
Decadal Hindu Population in West Bengal
Year	Pop.	±%
1901	10,786,582	—
1911	11,231,845	+4.1%
1921	10,783,197	−4.0%
1931	11,855,510	+9.9%
1941	14,102,633	+19.0%
1951	20,698,627	+46.8%
1961	27,521,688	+33.0%
1971	34,607,685	+25.7%
1981	42,007,159	+21.4%
1991	50,850,000	+21.1%
2001	58,104,835	+14.3%
2011	64,385,546	+10.8%

Percentage of Hindus in West Bengal by decades

Year	Percent	Decrease
1901	70.8%	-
1911	69.6%	-1.2%
1921	68.5%	-1.1%
1931	69.9%	+1.4%
1941	67%	-2.9%
1947	79.2%	+12.2%
1951	78.7%	-0.5%
1961	78.8%	+0.1%
1971	78.1%	-0.7%
1981	76.9%	-1.2%
1991	74.7%	-2.2%
2001	72.5%	-2.2%
2011	70.5%	-2%

After the partition of Bengal, a large section of upper and middle class Bengali Hindus, numbering 2,519,557, from East Pakistan (present-day Bangladesh) migrated across the border. They settled primarily in Kolkata and other district headquarter towns. These were especially in across the state but particularly in Nadia, South 24 Parganas, North 24 Parganas, Howrah, West Dinajpur and Jalpaiguri.

In 1971, during Bangladesh liberation war against Pakistan, a large group of refugees numbering an estimated 7,235,916 have arrived from Bangladesh to India's West Bengal, Out of which nearly 80% of them are Bengali Hindus and after Independence of Bangladesh, nearly 1,521,912 people belonging to Bengali Hindu refugees have decided to stay back in India particularly in West Bengal. The Hindu population in Western part of Bengal i.e West Bengal during first census of 1951 was around 19,462,706 and in 2011 census it had increased to 64,385,546. But the percentage of Hindu population in the state decreased from 78.45% in 1951 to 70.5% in 2011 Census. However, at 1947 just after the partition of Bengal, Hindus have formed nearly 79.2% of West Bengal population.

== Economy and business ==
Economic participation, work roles and distribution across professions for Bengali Hindus is similar to the wider population in the rural areas, where agriculture and related activities remain the primary occupation. In the urban areas, the largest segment of the Hindu population is engaged mostly as services professionals across sectors.

Historically, since the advent of Company rule in India, the upper-caste, landed Bengali Hindu gentry increasingly partnered with the East India Company to trade and supply goods such as silk, tea and jute to Europe. Subsequently, these families amassed massive wealth, increased their land holdings (Zamindaris) further. As the ruling elite of Kolkata, they established huge palaces and made the city a magnet for wealth. Businessmen like Dwarkanath Tagore and Raja Nabakrishna Deb are now recognized as some of India's earliest business tycoons in the modern era.

This continued to the 20th century when luminaries like Prafulla Chandra Ray established Bengal Chemicals and Pharmaceuticals, Rajendra Nath Mookerjee formed engineering firm Martin Burn and Surendra Mohan Bose created the Duckback brand during the Swadeshi movement, among many others.

In India, after independence, large number of Bengali Hindus, both from West Bengal have also settled in the rest of India and abroad. The middle and upper middle class populations (who historically had levels of educational attainment) are now well entrenched in numerous professional fields like law, medicine, academics, engineering, journalism, liberal arts, corporates, banking, tax, etc. On the other hand, most of the rural and semi-rural population are now engaged in contractual agriculture, notably in Punjab and Haryana, construction in Kerala and Karnataka, logistics, manufacturing and small-scale businesses across the country.

Average literacy levels of Bengali Hindus remain higher than other communities in West Bengal. However, the opposite is true for the minority Hindu population in Bangladesh.

Noted West Bengali Hindu industrialists include:

- Gouri Sen
- Gourmohan Dutta of GD Pharmaceuticals-manufacturers
- Hari Ghosh
- Banamali Sarkar
- Gobindram Mitter
- Prasanna Coomar Tagore
- Ramanath Tagore
- Rajen Mookerjee
- Rajat Kumar Gupta
- Alamohan Das
- Dwarkanath Tagore
- Purnendu Chatterjee of The Chatterjee Group & Haldia Petrochemicals
- Prashant Mukherjee
- Sadhan Dutt
- Subrata Roy of Sahara India Pariwar
- Sanjit Biswas
- Amar Gopal Bose of Bose Corporation
- Aveek Sarkar

== See also ==
- Hinduism in India
- Religion in West Bengal
- Hinduism in East Bengal
- East Bengali refugees
- Bengali Hindus

== Further links ==
- Chatterjee, Chandra (2020f). Syama Prasad Mookerjee, the Hindu Dissent and the Partition of Bengal, 1932-1947. Manohar Publishers. ISBN 9-781-000-16378-0. OCLC 1158770381.
