= Ramai Pandit =

Medieval Bengali Hindu poet

- রামাই পণ্ডিত
- Born: possibly end of the 10th century Champaighat, Bankura, Bengal
- Died: Unknown
- Occupation: Poet
- Notable work: Shunya Purana
- Children: Dharmadas

Ramai Pandit (Bengali: রামাই পণ্ডিত Ramai Ponđit, Ramai the Wise) was a medieval Bengali poet from the Rarh region of Bengal. The exact date of his birth is not known, but some scholars believe that he was born in the later half of the 10th century and also lived in the 11th century AD, as he is a contemporary to Mayur Bhatt, the court-poet of King Lausen. Some scholars believe that he lived in the 13th or 14th century AD. He is famous as the author of Shunya Purana, the scripture of Dharma Puja Bidhan, written in the 11th century AD. The extant Shunya Purana refers to events that occurred in the 14th century.

American Sanskrit scholar Edward Washburn Hopkins wrote in his "Origin and Evolution of Religion" in 1923 that,

Thus Ramai Pandit, who, in the Middle Ages, was an earthly expounder of the 19 great void I I doctrine (and was soon afterwards revered as a worker of miracles, a supernatural power), addresses this "form of the void," Shunyamurti, as "sole lord of all the worlds " and begs it as " highest god" to confer boons.

== Upbringing ==
According to a story, Ramai was the son of an unpopular Brahman sage; after his father's death, Ramai was Rama-kathai or Ramavataram Ramapala-charita. According to Ghanaram Chakrabarty's Dharmamangal, he was born in the Baiti caste of Bengal.

According to the traditional accounts preserved by the Bengali Dom caste, as well as Mayur Bhatta's narrative, Ramai Pandit was born to either an unpopular Brahmin family and after having lost his parents at an early age he was brought up by devotees of Dharma Thakur.

He was the priest of King Harishchandra.

== Devotional background ==
Ramai Pandit advocated the worship of God, whom he called Dharma and Shunya. His son, Dharmadas converted a king of Kalinga into the sect of Dharmathakur.

"Shunya" mean void and Ramai Pandit, like many other Hindu philosophers in Bengal and Orissa in the time period advocated worshipping God as void and formless.

Though Ramai Pandit was a devotee of Dharmathakur, in his Dharma Puja Bidhan he praises several other deities. He writes of Jagganath as Vishnu:

In the ninth incarnation Hari dwelt on the sea-coast known by the name Jagannath.

According to the Dharma-Mangala, written by Ghanarama, Ramai Pandit was the first great priest of the Dharma cult, and Dharma Thakura himself manifested during the reign of King Dharmapala's son.

Though he promoted the worship of Dharma Thakur, historically he has been viewed by Dharma Thakur devotees as incarnation himself.

== Works ==
- Dharmapuja Bidhan
- Shunya Purana - Though Ramai Pandit is credited with writing the original Shunya Purana, in the fourteenth century severe modifications were made to the original text, adding to it stories of Muslims in Bengal. It refers to the spread of the Madariya Islamic sect in Bengal founded by Syed Badiuddin who died in 1436 A.D. Sri Niranjaner Rushma chapter of the Sunya Puran states that "the form of Yavana (Muslims)…. assumed the name Khoda (Allah) and so frightened all the ‘high and mighty’ Hindu deities that they converted themselves immediately to Islamic divinities" and that "“Kartika became a Muslim Kazi and Ganesha became a Ghazi (Islamic warrior)". All the converted gods then entered the temples at Jajpur, destroyed the temples and images, while Ramai Pandit held the feet of the Dharma and cried "This is a terrible calamity".
