= Keshabeshwar Temple =

Hindu Temple in West Bengal, India

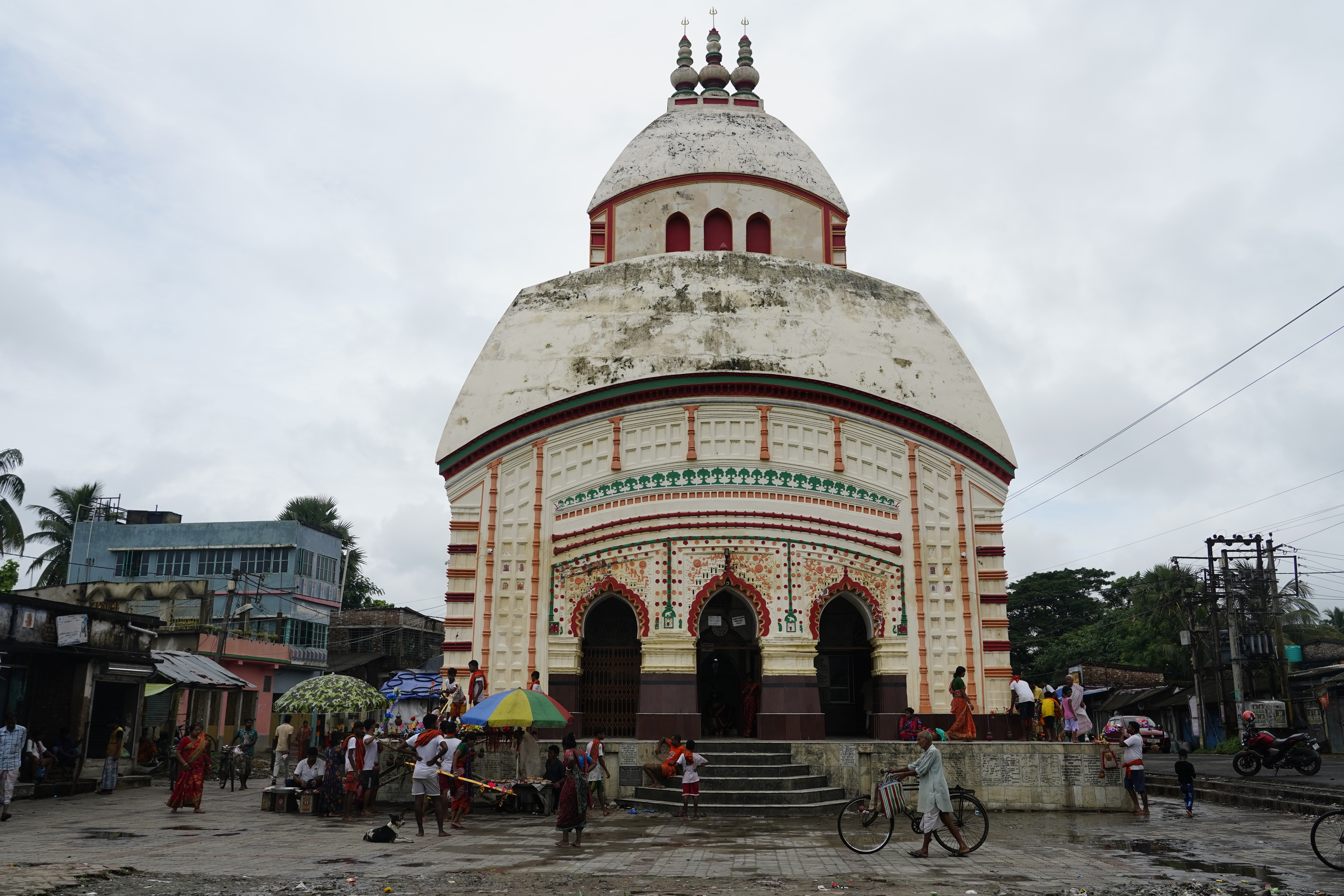

- Location within West Bengal

Religion
- Affiliation: Hinduism
- District: South 24 Parganas
- Deity: Shiva
- Festival: Charak Puja

Location
- Location: Mandirbazar, Ramnathpur
- State: West Bengal
- Country: India
- Interactive map of Keshabeshwar Temple
- Coordinates: 22°9′15.04″N 88°19′19.40″E

Architecture
- Architect: Bashudeb
- Type: Shiva temple
- Style: Atchala (Chala Style)
- Founder: Keshab Roychowdhury
- Funded by: Keshab Roychowdhury
- Established: 1748
- Completed: 1748

Keshabeshwar Temple is a Chala style Hindu temple at Ramnathpur village. It is located on the western side of the road and is dedicated to the Hindu deity Shiva. Charak Puja and fair are held every year in the temple premises.

In the middle of the 18th century, the local zamindar Keshab Roychowdhury started the construction of the temple for the purpose of establishing and worshiping the Shiva-lingam. An architect named Basudeb built the temple, and took 12 years to complete the construction of it. Zamindar Keshab Roychowdhury established the temple in 1748 AD (Shaka era 1670), and named it after himself. The temple was first renovated in 1356 Bangabda at the initiative of the Roychowdhury family and villagers; the temple was last renovated in 1402 Bangabda.

Keshabeshwar Temple is built by locally made bricks. The walls of the temple have terracotta decorations, such as floral and foliage designs. The roof is composed of eight sloping chalas or sheds in two steps—four lower and four upper. Three kalashs with trishuls are placed in the top of the upper chala structure. The main entrance on the south has three pointed arches.

== Architecture ==
=== Style ===
Keshabeshwar Temple is an example of the atchala architectural style—a sub-style of the chala style of temple architectur that originated in Bengal. Architecturally, features of the style include sloping roofs, pointed arches, kalash with trishul at the top; there are corridors on three sides of the garbhagriha. Common decorative elements are flowers, foliage, dancing women, deities and narrative scenes. Other elements of the design have been destroyed over time, or decayed, through neglect and lack of renovation.

=== Features ===
==== Temple structure ====
The temple stands on a high platform. It has a central chura or dome made of stalactite pendentive rising from the four corners of the walls of the nearly square garbhagriha. A wide corridor surrounds the garbhagriha on three sides except the north side. The corridor is connected to the temple premises by arches on three sides—east, south and west. The walls of the corridor and the garbhagriha are joined by sardals to provide additional strength to the temple structure.

==== Decoration ====
Integrated with the architecture of the building, one of the reasons for its fame is its size, height, structure plan and decoration. All the walls except the northern wall have terracotta and limestone decoration. As decoration, the walls mainly bear scenes of gods and goddesses, animals, foliage and dancing women. Apart from the foliated covering above the arch on three sides, there is a terracotta Vishnu in relief style—a sculptural method—at the top of the two pillars in the middle of the south facing arch and two bisected tiles above the two half-pillars attached to the wall. The bisected tile has images of Hanuman on one side and Kali on the other; the two contents are separated by borders.

== Bibliography ==
- Chattopadhyay, Sagar (2005). "পুরাকীর্তি পরিচয় - রামনাথপুর". দক্ষিণ চব্বিশ পরগনা জেলার পুরাকীর্তি (Paperback) (in Bengali) (1st ed.). Kolkata: Directorate Of Archaeology And Museums, Information and Cultural Affairs Department, Government of West Bengal. pp. 257–258.
- Bhattacharya, Ashok; Santra, Tarapada; Majumdar, Hemen; Mukhopadhyay, Sameer kumar; Bose, Debashis; Chowdhury, Indrajit; Mitra, Sumedh; Sengupta, Gautam, eds. (2017). "পুরাবৃত্ত ১". Purabritta (in Bengali). Kolkata: Directorate Of Archaeology And Museums, Information and Cultural Affairs Department, Government of West Bengal: 176–182.
