= Banawadi =

Village in Maharashtra

- Village
- Location in Maharashtra, India Banawadi (India)
- Coordinates: 17.846819°N 74.079328°E
- Country: India
- State: Maharashtra
- District: Satara
- Taluka: Koregaon

Government
  - MP: Shri. Ch. Udayanraje Bhosale
  - MLA: Shri. Shashikant Shinde (NCP)

Population (2011)
  - Total: 1,426

Languages
  - Official: Marathi
- Time zone: UTC+5:30 (IST)
- PIN: 415011
- Telephone code: (+91)2371
- Vehicle registration: MH 11 (Satara)
- Nearest city: Satara
- Lok Sabha constituency: Satara
- Vidhan Sabha constituency: Koregaon

Banawadi is a census village of Satara district in the Indian state of Maharashtra. It is situated near to the Satara Phaltan state highway, about 21 km north of Satara, about 108 km from Pune and 220 km from Mumbai.

== Demographics ==
In the 2011 India census, the village of Banawadi had a population of 1,426. literacy rate of Banawadi village was 91.11% compared to 82.34% of Maharashtra.

These forts are well known as dual forts situated in Banawadi village. Based on historical evidences these forts are built by king Bhoj II ruler from Shilahar Dynasty in 1191-1192 B.C. age of copper-inscriptions (Tamralech). In 1673 Shivaji, founder of Maratha Empire conquered it along with other forts in Satara region Ajinkyatara, Sjjangad, Kalyangad etc. Maratha ruled these forts till Sambhaji's regime, 1689 later Mughals empowered it from Maratha's. After Anglo-Maratha war British took over control of Satara region and hence of Chandan-Vandan.

Chandan-Vandan is also a sacred/famous place for pilgrims. There is a famous durgah and temple of Shiva is situated on top of Chandan fort. Every year urs-e-shareef is celebrated in remembrance of Gaus Paak Mehboob e Subhani (under of sunnatul Muslim jamat trust banawadi) on Chandan fort at banawadi. The post monsoon season is the perfect time to visit these forts. The area features lush greenery and exceptional visibility, which are rare during the monsoon season. This trek is well-suited for travelers seeking a less frequented destination.

== Banawadi Bagad ==
Bagad (Marathi language: बगाड) is a religious festive tradition, where in ceremonial pole from auspicious tree is venerated in some village jatras in honour of local deities in Maharashtra state of India. Bagad is a similar concept to Charak Puja, Gajan (festival) or Indian parallel of Mexican Danza de los Voladores.

Since long ago villagers and devotees of Vadhsidhnath from different places celebrating the traditional bagad (chariot of god) yatra. Bagad is made up of wooden blocks with huge stone wheels and decorated with coconuts and flowers. This annual festival attracts thousands of devotees during Chaitra month as per traditional Hindu lunar calendar.

== Education ==
- Rayat Shikshan Sanstha's New English School, Banawadi
- Z.P. School, Banawadi

== How to reach Banawadi ==
The best way to reach Banawadi is by road from Satara take public transport bus to Banawadi or any bus going towards Phaltan, get down at Ambawade fata and take local transport for near 4 km. The alternate way is You may Board train Koyna Express train number 11029.This train runs daily between Mumbai CST to Kolhapur.It departs from Mumbai CST at 08:40 and get down at Wathar Station, get public or local transport from Wathar Station to reach Banawadi.

Nearby railway stations are Wathar Station, Palashi Station and Mahuli Satara. Nearby airports are Karad and Pune.

== Villages near by ==
- Dudhanwadi
- Arabwadi
- Ibrahimpur
- Ambawade
- Pimpode Khurd
- Deur
- Shivthar
- Bhuinj
- Panchwad
- Palshi Station
- Satara Road
