= Naranarayan of Bhurishrestha =

Naranarayan
- Maharaja of Bhurishrestha
- Predecessor: Pratapnarayan
- Successor: Lakshminarayan
- Spouse: Amritakala
- Issue: Lakshminarayan
- Father: Pratapnarayan
- Mother: Mahendrani

Maharaja Naranarayan (Bengali: মহারাজা নরনারায়ণ) was the king of Bhurishrestha who maintained the integrity and sovereignty of the kingdom by diplomatically averting the occupation of the kingdom by the Mughal forces.

== Reign ==
Naranarayan ascended the throne of Bhurishrestha when he was well past his prime. At that time Aurangzeb was the Mughal emperor and Shaista Khan was the governor of Bengal. At that time the British East India Company was making heavy inroads into the delta and Naranarayan's first task was to strengthen the security of the kingdom. He erected temporary forts on both sides of the Damodar, near the confluence of Damodar and Bhagirathi, and garrisoned his troops there. He enhanced the patrol at the watch towers erected by Pratapnarayan. Prince Lakshminarayan assumed the role of the commander-in-chief of the armed forces of Bhurishrestha. He elected, Ramdas Adak, as the Dewan of Bhurishrestha. The Mughal governor Shaista Khan approached Naranarayan for help against the British. Naranarayan agreed and temporary Mughal outposts and watch towers were established at Bargachhia, Krishnanagar near Khanakul and Dilakash, on the Ron. Bhurishrestha, however, remained unaffected during the course of the Mughal-British conflict.

In the meanwhile, Krishnaram Rai, a Punjabi Khatri merchant obtained the zamindari of Burdwan and few other estates in 1689. But he began to forcefully collect taxes from the northern regions of Bhurishrestha. Naranarayan sent him an official warning regarding the infringement upon the sovereignty of Bhurishrestha. When the warning went unheeded, Naranarayan dispatched the army under the command of prince Lakshminarayan to subdue Krishnaram. In the ensuing battle Krishnaram not only lost much of his resources including men and money, he was forced pay a huge indemnity.

== Welfare ==
Like his father, Naranarayan too was a charitable ruler. He grants huge brahmottar properties to the branch of the royal family based at Pendo. In 1685, he granted Maniray Giri Goswami, the priest of the Maninath Shiva temple a debottar of 101 bighas. During his deeksha, he granted the royal guru, the village of Senpur as pranami and more than 50 bighas of tax free lands. He made a total of more than hundred debottar and brahmottar grants.

== Art and culture ==
Naranarayan, like his illustrious father, too was a patron of art and culture. Under his patronage a commentary on Virata Parva and the story of Nachiketa as mentioned in the Katha Upanishad of Krishna Yajurveda were compiled and rewritten. These two works were significant because they were required during the sraddha ceremony. The other works composed during his times were few smritis and agamas.

== Notes ==
Naranarayan of Bhurishrestha Bharadwaj Dynasty
Regnal titles
Preceded by Pratapnarayan	Maharaja of Bhurishrestha	Succeeded by Lakshminarayan
