= Sumon =

== People ==
- Kabir Sumon previously known as Suman Chattopadhyay, Bengali musician, journalist, writer, actor and a member of the parliament of India.
- Saidus Salehin Khaled Sumon, Bangladeshi musician from Aurthohin band, also known as Bassbaba.
- Sumon Saha, a first class cricketer from Bangladesh.
- Sumon Barua, a first-class and list A cricketer from Bangladesh.
- Sumon K Chakrabarti, former chief national correspondent and one of the founder employee of Indian CNN-IBN.
- Sumon - Bangladeshi child actor.

== Places ==
- Sumon, Niigata, was a village located in Kitauonuma District, Niigata Prefecture, Japan which was later merged to create the city of Uonuma.
- Sum (administrative division) - also known as sumons, a type of administrative district used in China, Mongolia, and Russia.
