= Lakshminarayan of Bhurishrestha =

Lakshminarayan
- Maharaja of Bhurishrestha
- Reign: 1695–1712
- Predecessor: Naranarayan
- Spouse: Himadrija
- Father: Naranarayan
- Mother: Amritakala

Maharaja Lakshminarayan (Bengali: মহারাজা লক্ষ্মীনারায়ণ) was the last ruler of Bhurishrestha. When he was the prince, he had defeated and humiliated Krishnaram Rai, the Raja of Bardhaman in a battle. The latter was subsequently killed by a rebellious feudatory called Shobha Singh, who killed most of Krishnaram's family as well. However one of his grandsons Kirtichand Ray later rose into prominence and earned the favour of Murshid Quli Khan. With the latter's active patronage he conspired to annex Bhurishrestha while Lakshminarayan was away from the capital. Lakshminarayan returned to fight valiantly against Kirtichand, but failed to maintain the sovereignty of the kingdom due to sabotage from within.

== Early life ==
While he was a young prince he rose to the position of commander-in-chief of the armed forces. He was a great soldier and a skilled archer. When Krishnaram Ray infringed upon the territory of Bhurishrestha, he led the royal forces against him. He showed remarkable bravery in the battle and defeated Krishnaram Ray.

== Reign ==
Lakshminarayan ascended the throne of Bhurishrestha some time between 1690 and 1695, after Naranarayan died. The Mughal empire was on the decline, the law and order situation in the province of Bengal was worsening under the governorship of Ibrahim Khan. Taking advantage of the situation in the mid of 1695, Shobha Singh, the zamindar of Chetua-Borda revolted against the Mughal Empire and began to annex the neighbouring estates. He became so powerful, that he decided to attack Bardhaman. Krishnaram, sensing danger, pleaded Lakshminarayan for help. But the latter, irritated with Krisharam's activities and allegiance to the Mughals refused any kind of help and instead allowed Shobha Singh to pass through the Bhurishrestha territory and attack Burdwan. Krishnaram was killed in the conflict. Shobha Singh sacked Bardhaman and took Krishnaram's family members as hostages.

After Murshid Quli Khan became the Naib Nazim of Bengal, he adopted a policy of expansion by which he planned to bring the independent Hindu states like Bhurishrestha and Bishnupur under the standard of Islam. Kirtichand Ray, the successor to Krishnaram's son Jagatram was close to Murshid Quli Khan and he was entrusted with the conquest of Bhurishrestha. Kirtichand conspired with Rajvallabh, the younger brother of Sadashiva, the garhnayak of Pendo to overthrow the kingdom. Rajvallabh managed to get the diwan Radhavallabh Datta on his side with promises of promotions and other benefits. They were waiting for the opportune moment to wreck the kingdom with a sabotage from within. Soon, Lakshminarayan made an alliance with the Raja of Tamluk and planned to perform puja at the Bargabhima temple at Tamluk along with his wife. At that time Rajavallabh engineered a rumour that a band of Bargis were approaching Bhurishrestha and were joined by ferocious dacoits from Telangana. Lakshminarayan deployed his troops to Tamluk leaving the capital under the command of Radhavallabh. In the meantime, Rajvallabh led the forces of Kritichand into the kingdom accompanied by the forces of the Mughal faujdar of Hooghly. After capturing the forts of Chhaunapur and Naskardanga, their combined troops surrounded Garh Bhavanipur. Bamacharan Paladhi, the kotwal held the fort for two days before being killed by an insider. His wife Veermati manned the defence after his death, before being martyred. Lakshminarayan returned with the troops and a heavy battle ensued. Kirtichand's forces had taken control of most of the fort and drove the advantage to victory. Lakshminarayan fled with the royal family to Chandrakona.

== Welfare ==
Lakshminarayan like his father was a patron of art and culture. In 1705, he erected the temple of Gopinath Jiu in Garh Bhavanipur. He granted the village of Bally to the royal priest Ram Kishor. The village of Lakshminarayanpur in Howrah bears the legacy of his rule.

== Notes ==
Lakshminarayan of Bhurishrestha Bharadwaj Dynasty
Regnal titles
Preceded by Naranarayan	Maharaja of Bhurishrestha; 169?-1712	Succeeded by Kingdom abolished
