= Charak Puja =

Hindu folk festival

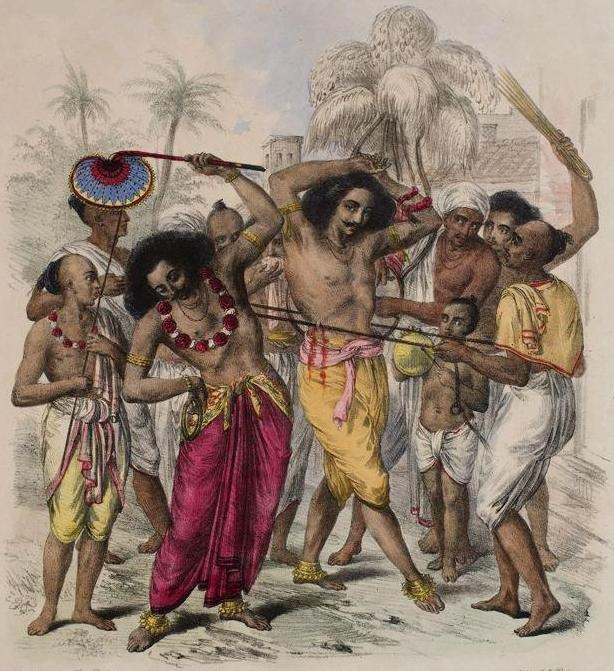
- Illustration of Charak Puja from Twenty-four plates illustrative of Hindoo and European Manners in Bengal (1832) by Sophie Charlotte Belnos (1795–1865)
- Also called: Nil Puja, Hajrha Puja
- Observed by: Hindus
- Type: Hindu
- Related to: Gajan

Charak Puja or Pachamara Mela (also known as Chadak, Nil Puja or Hajrha Puja) is part of the Bengali Hindu folk festival of Gajan, held in honor of the deity Shiva or Dharmathakur. The Gajan festival includes numerous forms of austerities like walking on hot coals or piercing the body with metal rods; Charak refers to the practice of hook-swinging which generally is the last penance performed during the festival.

Gajan and Charak Puja is primarily practiced in the Indian state of West Bengal and in a few parts of Assam among the Bengali Hindu Community and also in Bangladesh, but hook-swinging is traditionally practiced in other parts of India as well like kavadi in Tamil Nadu.

The preparation usually starts a month in advance. The people responsible for the arrangement of the festival go from village to village to procure the necessary components like paddy, oil, sugar, salt, honey, money and other items needed for the ritual. At midnight of Songkranti, the worshippers gather to worship Shiva and Ma Durga for success. Afterwards a puja, the prasad (Items blessed by the deity) are distributed.

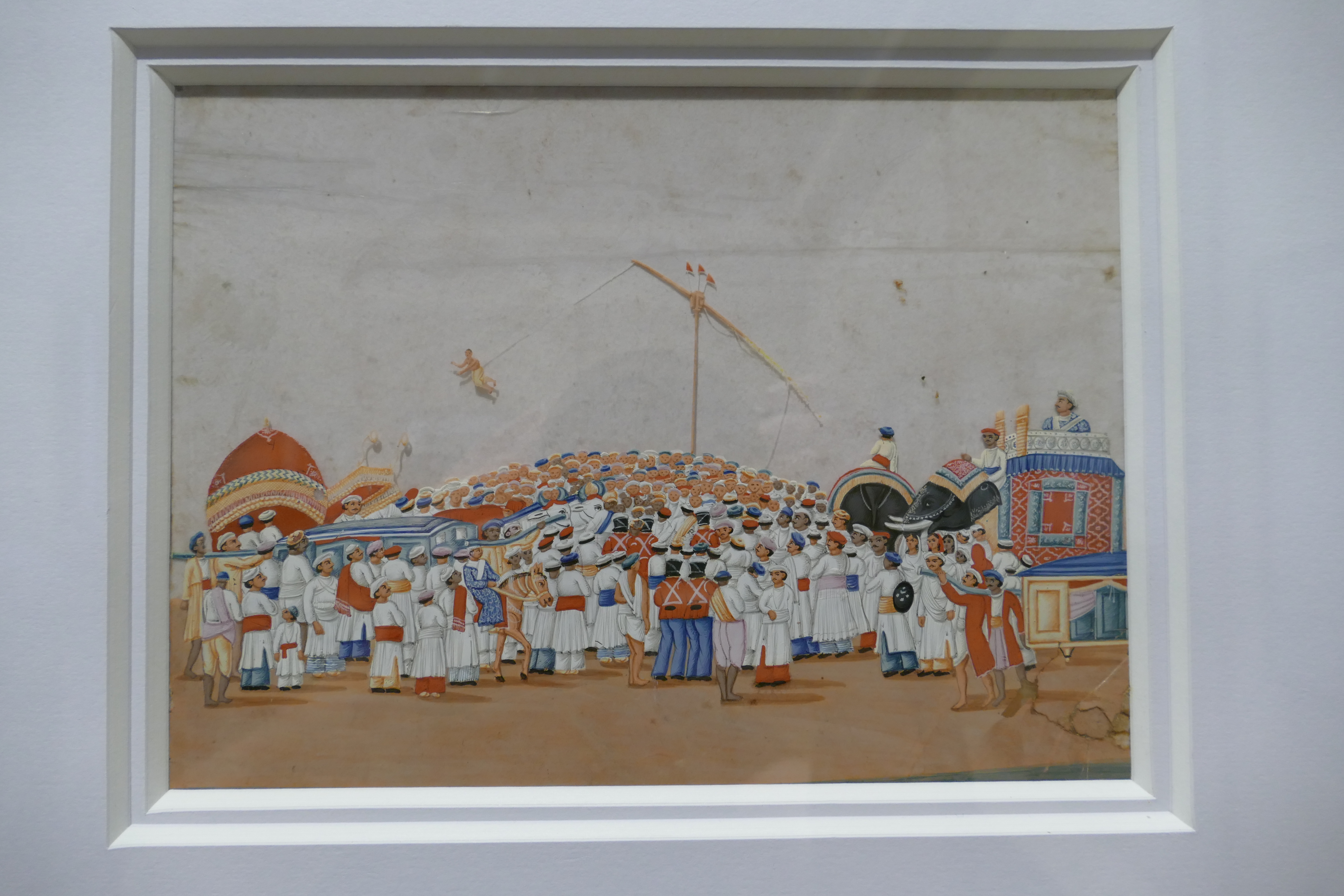
Charak Puja in an East India Company era painting, 19th century CE, at the Indian Museum.

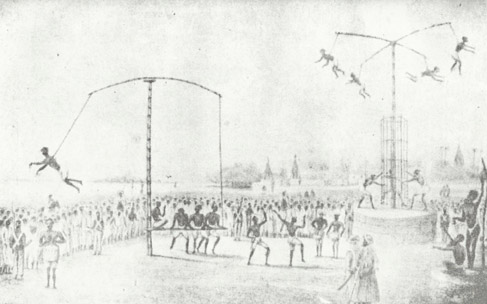
Charak festival in Kolkata in 1849

== Charak Puja in Bangladesh ==
In Bangladesh, it frequently takes place in Moulvibazar, Thakurgaon district, and Galachipa Upazila of the Patuakhali District. Goalkhali, Gabua, Haridebpur, Lalua, Lohalia, and other villages are well known for "Charak Puja". Though the aristocracy and frequency of the festival is being deemed now, it is still being performed regularly by people with an uncommon amount of devotion. For them it's a part of their life. The Most popular festival "Charak Puja" is found at places like Dholar Haat, Akcha, Gorea, Khochabari(Singia), Hothath para at Thakurgaon Sadar, same places of Tripura Dhalai District like Kamalpur and Kulai.

== Bagad and Sirimanu ==
In Maharashtra Bagad (Marathi language: बगाड) in Andhra pradesh Sirimanu festival is a religious festive tradition, where a ceremonial pole from an auspicious tree is venerated. In some villages, jatras in honour of local deities in Maharashtra & Andhra Pradesh are performed. Bagad is a similar concept to Charak Puja, Gajan (festival) or Indian parallel of Mexican Danza de los Voladores.

== See also ==
- Banawadi § Banawadi Bagad
- Gajan (festival)
- Sirimanothsavam
