= Dharmamangal =

The Dharmamangal (Bengali: ধর্মমঙ্গল) is a medieval Bengali narrative poem. Thought to be first performed during the reign of Dharma Pala (circa 775 - 810 AD), it was written by several poets over the years. Orated in folk ceremonies to honor the victory of Lausen, it is an important subgenre of mangalkavya, with narratives of local deities of rural Bengal, the most significant genre of medieval Bengali literature. The texts belong to this subgenre eulogize Dharmathakur, a folk deity worshipped in the Rarh region of Bengal. According to tradition, the earliest poet of Dharmamangal was Mayura Bhatta. The Dharmamangal texts were meant for singing during the twelve-day ritual ceremony, known as Gajan. These texts are part of a larger group of texts associated with the worship of Dharma. In addition to the Dharmamangal texts, this larger group includes a number of works known as the Dharmapurans, which narrate the story of creation and the liturgical works known as the Samjatpaddhatis.

== Dharmamangal ==
The texts of the Dharmamangal comprise two narratives,

- the narrative of the Puranic king Harishchandra, his queen Madana and son Luichandra. With the grace of god Dharmathakur, Harishchandra was blessed with a son Luichandra, with the condition that the son would be given away to the cult of Dharmathakur. Harishchandra forgot about the condition. Later Dharmathakur showed up as a Brahmin, and asked for the cooked flesh of Luichandra. Harishchandra and Madana killed Luichandra and served his flesh. Luichandra was later restored to life after the king and the queen accepted the Dharmathakur cult.
- the narrative of exploits of a folk hero of Bengal, Lausen.

Most significant poets of Dharmamangal were Rupram Chakrabarty (17th century) and Ghanaram Chakrabarty (17th-18th century). Other poets of Dharmamangal include Ramdas Adak, Khelaram Chakrabarty, Shrishyam Pandit, Dharmadas, Sitaram Das, Yadunath or Yadavram Pandit, Maniklal Ganguli, Ramchandra Bandyopadhyaya, Narasimha Basu, Prabhuram Mukhopadhyaya, Hridayram Sau, Shankar Chakrabarty, Ramnarayan and Ramkanta Ray.

== Dharmapuran ==
The texts of Dharmapuran begin with narrative of creation. The other narratives included in these texts are the narrative about Shiva, the hagiographies of Minanatha and Gorakshanatha, the narrative of Ganga, the narrative of Sada Dom and Ramai Pandit, the description of the atrocities of Dharma in Jajpur and the narrative of king Harishcahndra. The significant poets of Dhramapuran or Anilpuran were Ramai Pandit and Sahadeb Chakrabarty.

== Liturgical works ==
The most significant liturgical work is the Dharmapujavidhan, ascribed to Ramai Pandit as well as to Raghunandan. Another liturgical text, the Yatrasiddharayer Paddhati is a recent work.

== See also ==
- Mangalkavya
- Ramdas Adak
