= Bhavashankari =

- Maharani of Bhurishrestha; Raybhagini
- Coronation: 1570
- Predecessor: Rudranarayan
- Successor: Pratapnarayan (1616)
- Spouse: Rudranarayan
- Father: Dinanath Chaudhuri
- Religion: Hinduism

Maharani Bhavashankari (Maharanī Bhavaśaṅkarī) was a ruler of Bhurishreshtha kingdom of Bengal.

== Bibliography ==
- Bhattacharya, Bidhubhusan (2009). Raybaghini O Bhurishrestha Rajkahini. Kolkata: Nababharati Prakashani.
- Ray, Bharat Chandra. Raibaghini.

Bhavashankari Bharadwaj Dynasty
Regnal titles
Preceded by Rudranarayan	Maharani of Bhurishrestha	Succeeded by Pratapnarayan (Jaminder under the Mughal Empire)
