= Samiran, Hamadan =

Samiran سميران
- Village
- Location within Iran
- Coordinates: 34°52′05″N 48°02′51″E
- Country: Iran
- Province: Hamadan
- County: Asadabad
- Bakhsh: Central
- Rural District: Chaharduli

Population (2006)
  - Total: 224
- Time zone: UTC+3:30 (IRST)
  - Summer (DST): UTC+4:30 (IRDT)

Samiran (Persian: سميران, also Romanized as Samīrān, and Semīrān) is a village in Chaharduli Rural District, in the Central District of Asadabad County, Hamadan Province, Iran. At the 2006 census, its population was 224, in 50 families.
