= Sugato Chakravarty =

Sugato Chakravarty is a professor of management at Purdue University. He serves as associate editor of the Journal of Financial Markets.

Sugato completed high school at St. Xavier's School in Calcutta. He graduated from Jadavpur University in Calcutta with a Bachelor of Technology in Chemical Engineering before relocating to the United States for graduate studies. Chakravarty obtained a Master of Science in Mechanical Engineering from the University of Kentucky, and his PhD in Finance from Indiana University.

== Career ==
Over his career, Dr. Chakravarty has taught and researched in interdisciplinary fields of psychology, marketing, finance and mathematics. His primary research areas include market microstructure, banking and asset pricing involving stock, options and fixed income securities, and spans both domestic and foreign markets. He is probably best known for his work on the decimalisation of stock prices, insider trading, and stealth trading.

At Purdue, he is best known for teaching a Personal Finance course that teaches undergraduates the basic skills of money management, credit, insurance and retirement. The course also covers all popular and current topics and relates them back to the basic principles. The class is structured around a football cliché: "Offense wins games but defense wins championships." Professor Chakravarty argues that to win the game of life one needs to have solid offensive and defensive strategies. Investments (including those for retirement) is an offensive strategy while insurance is a defensive strategy. Credit plays the role of good special teams in that a judicious use of credit can move the line of scrimmage from one's 20-yard line to the 45 or 50 yard line and thereby makes it easier to score a personal finance touchdown. The class boasts enrollments of over 400 students every semester and is an elective in almost all majors across the West Lafayette campus.

== Publications ==
Dr. Chakravarty's research has appeared in leading academic journals, including the Journal of Finance, Journal of Financial Economics, Journal of Business, Journal of Financial and Quantitative Analysis, Journal of Empirical Finance, and the Journal of Financial Markets. His work has been written about in leading newspapers like the Wall Street Journal, Barron's, Investor's Business Daily and many others. His research has also been used as evidence in hearings by the US Congress. Professor Chakravarty's research impact is provided in Google Scholar (https://scholar.google.com/citations?user=_A6bNxYAAAAJ) and is upwards of 5732.

== Teaching ==
Dr. Chakravarty has also been a pioneer in the broad area of student learning in large classrooms. At heart is the commonly reported concern that students are distracted in large auditorium lecture formats commonly employed by all major universities in the US and elsewhere to teach popular classes. Accordingly, Dr. Chakravarty has forged new ground by using social media as a vehicle to encourage student participation and learning through the specific use of a technology known as "Hotseat" (a variant of Twitter), by opening a simultaneous back channel of communication among students and between the students and the instructor during classroom lectures. Thus, through HotSeat, his students can ask questions or opine on a topic being discussed in real time and engage in a real interaction with the instructor and among fellow students in the room. The details of this ongoing social experiment have been extensively written up in the USA Today, the New York Times, as well as featured in an article in The Chronicle of Higher Education.

== Awards ==
Professor Chakravarty has won research awards including the Barclay's Global Investors Research Award for the best paper on Australasian Markets (with P. Kalev and L. Pham) and the Best Paper Award (with B. Van Ness and R. Van Ness) at the Eastern Finance Annual Conference. He has also won a Q-group Research award, and won Best Paper Award of 2011 in the Journal of Financial Research, and is listed in the Marquis Who's Who in American Education.

== Professional Service ==
Chair, Purdue University’s Censure and Dismissal Procedures Faculty Committee 2006–. Member, Purdue University’s Censure and Dismissal Procedures Faculty Committee 2005–2006. Director of graduate studies for consumer economics within Consumer Sciences and Retailing. Associate Editor: Journal of Financial Markets. Editorial Advisory Board: The Open Economics Journal.

Referee for: Journal of Finance; American Economic Review; Review of Financial Studies; Journal of Business; Journal of Financial Markets; Journal of Financial and Quantitative Analysis; Quarterly Journal of Economics; Family and Consumer Science Research Journal; Journal of Business and Psychology; Journal of Economic Psychology; Journal of Financial Intermediation; The Journal of Futures Markets; The Journal of Banking and Finance; Journal of Financial Research; Economic Journal; Canadian Research Council, RAND Journal of Economics.

Membership in Academic and Professional Societies: Financial Management Association (also member of Program Committee). Western Finance Association. American Finance Association. American Council on Consumer Interests.
