= K. M. Chakravarty =

Indian scientist

Kshitindra Mohan Chakravarty
- Born: 1 May 1900; Comilla, British India (now Bangladesh)
- Died: 19 February 1988 (aged 87)
- Education: Bachelors of science, Masters of Sciences, D.Sc
- Alma mater: Dacca University

Kshitindra Mohan "K.M." Chakravarty (1 May 1900 – 19 February 1988) was an Indian chemist, fuel technician and teacher.

== Education and career ==
He was born on 1 May 1900 in Comilla, Bangladesh. In 1925, he obtained a Masters in Chemistry at the University of Dacca, and then granted D.Sc from the University of Dacca in 1941 as he researched “catalytic formation of methane from carbon monoxide and hydrogen.”

He was appointed professor at the University of Dhaka and worked there from 1941 to 1947, and dedicated himself to research on fuel technology and industrial catalysts.

In 1945, in response to the demands of the Indian government, he traveled to the United States and Great Britain as a member of the technical mission to understand and choose the process of the Sindri fertilizer plant. He was a chief chemist in the Sindri fertilizer factory and served until stabilizing the operation till 1958. Later, he was appointed principal of the GC College of Silcher until 1960. Under C.S.I.R, he worked as a Retired Scientist for research.

Chakravarty was also a member of Indian Standard Institution (General Council), Indian Science Congress Association, American Institute of Chemical Engineers, Fellow of Institute of Fuel(London) and member of Government of India Board of studies in Chemical Engineering and chemical technology.

== Selected patents ==
- Improvement of the catalytic mass for hydrocarbon synthesis, patent number GB580612, 1946-09-13.
- Primary coating process, process for preparing fertilizer coated with lac, patent number : In 109184.

== Research and publications ==
- X-Ray Diffraction Studies of a Nickel–Thoria–Kieselguhr Catalyst for Fischer–Tropsch Synthesis
- Catalytic Formation of Methane from Carbon Mono-oxide And Hydrogen—A study Of Nickel aluminia catalyst prepared from the hydroxide using potassium, Sodium And aluminium Hydroxides As precipitants
- Zeitschrift für anorganische und allgemeine Chemie, K.M. Chakravarty, 1938
