= Sankar Chakraborti =

Indian financier

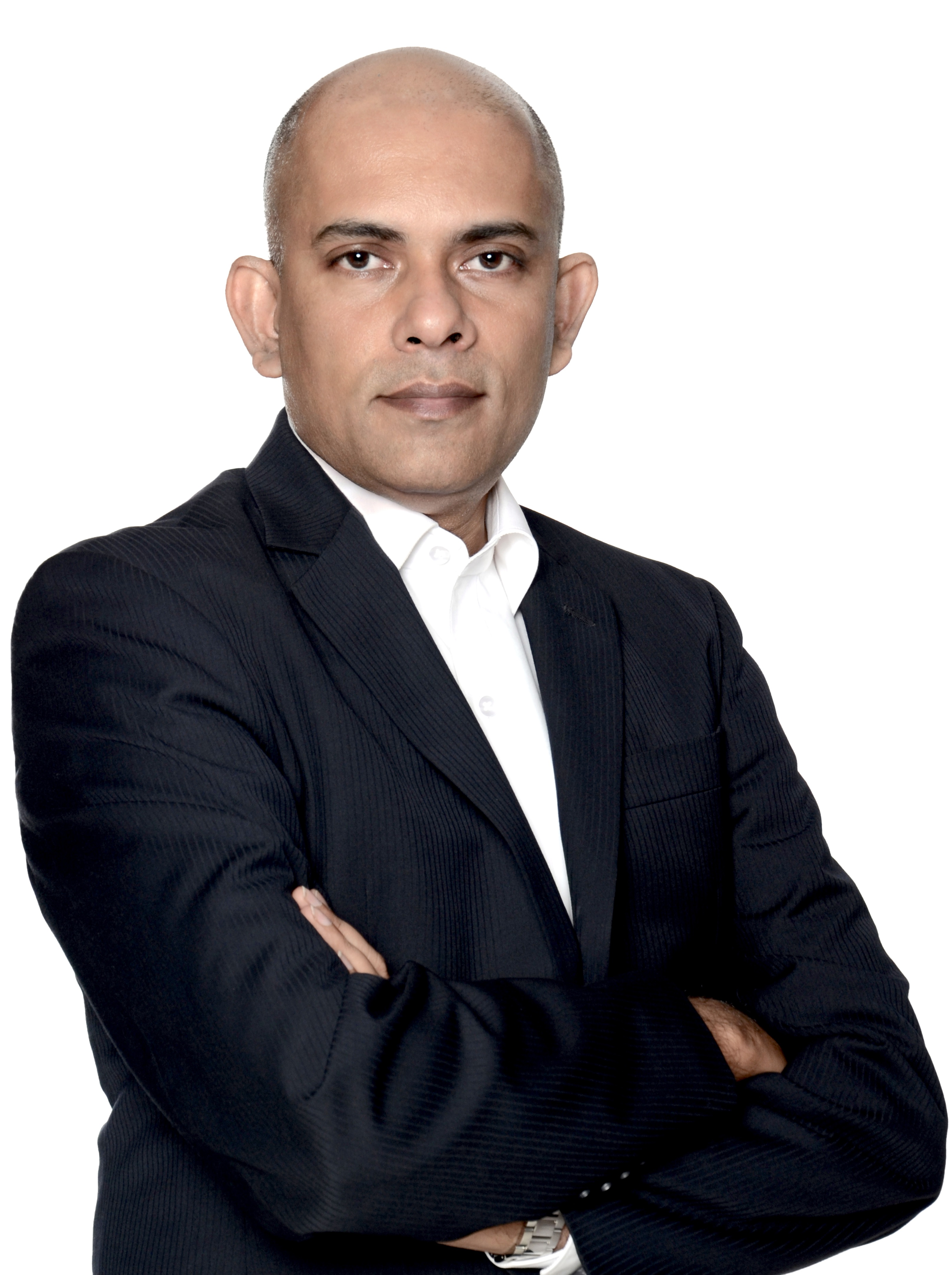
- Born: West Bengal, India
- Education: Centre for Management Studies, BU (M.B.A.)
- Occupations: Group CEO of Acuite Ratings & Research Limited
- Family: Married with two children
- Website: www.acuite.in

Sankar Chakraborti is the Group Chief Executive Officer of Acuité Ratings & Research Limited, a credit rating agency, accredited by Reserve Bank of India as an External Credit Assessment Institution under New Capital Adequacy Framework (Basel II), and registered with Securities and Exchange Board of India. He is also the Chairman of SMERA Ratings Private Limited, and Chairman of ESG Risk Assessments & Insights Limited, India's first ESG Rating Agency.

Acuite Ratings & Research is an initiative of Ministry of Finance, Government of India. Acuite is promoted by Small Industries Development Bank of India (SIDBI), Dun & Bradstreet Information Services India Private Limited (D&B), leading public, private, and foreign banks in India.

Chakraborti is an expert in credit ratings, Indian MSME sector and Environment, Social & Governance issues in investments.

== Early life and education ==
Chakraborti's father was an employee of Indian Railways and his mother is a retired school teacher. The family was based in Asansol, an industrial town in West Bengal. Chakraborti attended Ramakrishna Mission Vidyapith, Purulia, a boarding school, where he pursued science. He graduated and then obtained an MBA from Centre for Management Studies, BU, West Bengal.

== Career ==
After his MBA, Chakraborti joined Capital Market Publishers (I) Ltd. (1995–1997). He also worked for Centre for Monitoring Indian Economy (1997–2000), a provider of macro-economic data and decision support solutions. Chakraborti spent nearly 14 years with CRISIL Limited (2000–2014), a credit rating agency. At CRISIL, he worked in various capacities with CRISIL Research, CRISIL Ratings and (on deputation with) S&P – Tokyo. He helped CRISIL develop its Bank Loan Rating portfolio of 10,000+ ratings customers, and at that time stated that he believes bank loan rating helps inculcate financial discipline in the borrower. Chakraborti joined Acuite Group (at the time known as SMERA Ratings Limited) in July 2014. Since 2014, Chakraborti has led the re-branding of Acuite group, technology adoption, financial restructuring of the Group and founded the ESG Rating subsidiary ESGRisk.ai of Acuite.

Chakraborti is a well known opinion-maker. He frequently speaks at events & seminars and writes articles as an expert on credit ratings and Environment, Social & Governance (ESG) issues related to investments.

He is currently a member of FICCI's Capital Markets Committee and Maharashtra State Council, member of Indian Banks' Association's Standing Committee on MSMEs, and a member of CII's National MSME Council.

From September 2017 to August 2020, Chakraborti served as an Independent Director on the Board of Indian Oil Corporation Limited (IOCL), a Fortune 500 company. He was a member of the Working Group constituted by the Insolvency and Bankruptcy Board of India for recommending the strategy and approach for implementation of the provisions of the Insolvency and Bankruptcy Code, 2016. He was a member of the Board of Studies (Finance) of SIES College of Management Studies (SIESCOMS). He was a jury member for the SME Business Excellence Award 2014 hosted by Dun & Bradstreet, The Times Group and Federal Bank.

== Award ==
Chakraborti is the winner of Indian Achievers' Awards award in 2021 in recognition of outstanding professional achievement and contribution in BFSI sector.
