= Sirimanothsavam =

Grand Procession

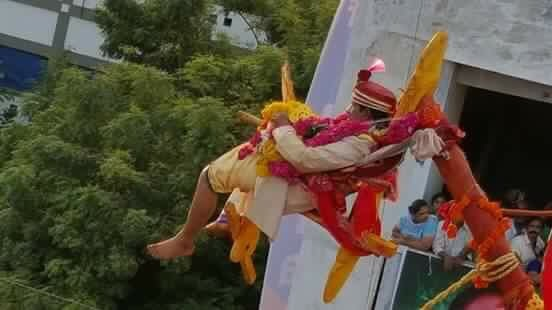
- Sirimanu of Pydithalli Ammavaru
- Official name: Sirimanothsavam
- Observed by: People of Vizianagaram Devotees comes from various parts of Andhra Pradesh and Orissa
- Type: Village festival
- Observances: Tholellu, Sirimanothsavam, Uyyala Kambala, Pydithalli Theppotsavam on Pedda cheruvu
- Date: The first Tuesday after Dussehra
- Related to: P V A V S Bhanu Raja (Asst Commissioner)

Sirimanothsavam, (Telugu: సిరిమాను పండుగ, సిరి మాను ఉత్సవం) (also referred to as Sirimanu Uthsavam, Siri Manu Fete/Festival, Sirimanu Panduga) is a festival organized to propitiate Goddess Pyddithallamma of Vizianagram Town. Siri means "goddess Lakshmi in other words wealth and prosperity " and manu means "trunk" or "log". The priest of the temple, while taking procession between the fort and temple three times in the evening, hangs from the tip of the long, lean wooden staff (measuring 60 feet), raised high into the sky. The priest possessed by the goddess would himself tell a few days before, where this manu would be available. It is from that place only the log has to be procured. Hanging from the upper end of the staff, which is raised high into the sky, is a very risky exercise, but it is believed that the grace of the Goddess protects the priest from falling off. It is held in the month of September or October (Dasara) of every year. It is a great carnival attended by two to three lakhs of people from the neighboring towns and villages. The Rajas of Vizianagaram oversee the arrangements for this event. The APSRTC runs about 250 buses from different parts of the state to facilitate transport of devotees to Vizianagram to attend this festival.

== History ==
It was during 1757, when the king Pusapati Peda Vijaya Rama Raju of Vizianagaram was busy in the Battle of Bobbili, second Anand has taken the charge of crown and died in the year 1760. His wife also died along with him in Sati (practice). Then the wife of Peda Vijaya Rama Raju, Rani Chandrayamma has adopted Vijaya Rama Raju who belonged to Vizianagaram dynasty as per history.

If we go through the history of 104 temples constructed by Vizianagar Sanstan some history of those temples can be known by virtue of their location. But there is no specific history about Sri Pydithalli Ammavaru temple constructed by this sansthan. According to local legend, Pydithalli Ammavaru is the Grama Devata (presiding deity) of Vizianagaram. Some say that this Ammavaru is a sister of Maharanis of Vizianagaram. But there are many evidences that Pydithalli Ammvaru belongs to Vizianagaram dynasty. Even though there are no reliable evidence about birth and other details of Pydimamba, as per the local legend, an idol of Pydimamba was found on the west side of Pedda Cheruvu of Vizianagaram on the first Tuesday, following Vijaya Dasami after completion of battle of Bobbili.

It was in 1750 when the French leader Marquis de Bussy-Castelnau was staying with entire battalion near Hyderabad. Many soldiers died due to Small Pox (Masuchi). He was going through a financial crisis. Peda Vijaya Rama Raju of Vizianagaram helped him to overcome it and rebuild his battalion. In 1756 Bussy visited Rajahmundry. It is rumored that Vijaya Rama Raju gave a warm welcome to Bussy at Rajahmundry.

At that time Bobbili Maharajas were more powerful. There are some differences between Bobbili and Vizianagaram Rajas. Because of those differences and some other reasons Battle of Bobbili started on 23 January 1757. During the battle entire Bobbili fort got destroyed and many Bobbili soldiers died in the battle. The wife of Vijaya Rama Raju and Sister Sri. Pydimamba tried to stop the battle by hearing the news but were not successful. By that time, only Sri Pydimamba, sister of Vijayaramaraju was suffering from Small Pox. While she was in the puja of Goddess she learned that Vijayaramaraju was in trouble. She wanted to inform her brother regarding this and tried to convey the message through Vizianagaram soldiers, but every one was in the battle. She started with Patiwada Appalanaidu to convey the message in a horse cart. But, by that time, she got the news that his brother Vijaya Rama Raju died in the hands of Tandrapapa Rayudu, She became unconscious. Patiwada Applanaidu sprinkled water over her face and she regained consciousness and told Appalanaidu that she will not live anymore and She is going to merge with the village Goddess. Her statue will be found at the west bank of Pedda Cheruvu (A pond located at the heart of Vizianagaram lies to the west of Vizianagaram Fort). The fishermen found the idol of Pydimamba and constructed a temple called Vanam Gudi for goddess, opposite to Vizianagaram Railway Station which was the first temple for Pydimamba, the second temple is located at Three Lanterns junction.

== Procession ==
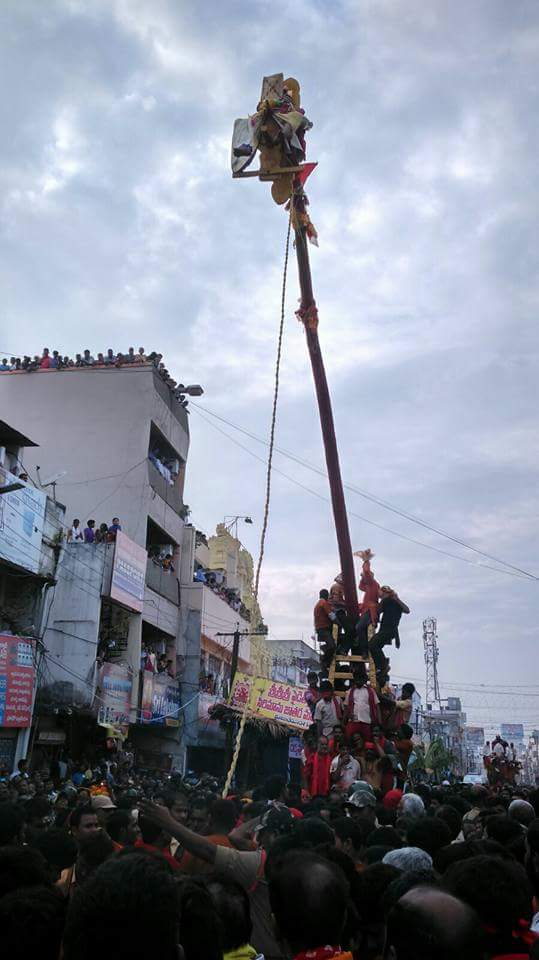
Procession of the Sirimanu

Sirimanu Utsav is being celebrated every year on the first Tuesday following Vijayadasami. Sirimanu means a big trunk. It is believed that approximately 15 days before Sirimanu Utsav, goddess Pydimamba would come in the dream of temple Pujari and tell him where the Sirimanu for that year could be found. Pujari would go in search of Sirimanu and will cut the Sirimanu after performing traditional puja. That Sirimanu can be located anywhere. The owner must agree to cut his tree for Utsav. That tree will be shaped neatly into Sirimanu and will be placed over the chariot. This Sirimanu will be brought to the Three Lanters junction around 2:00 pm. Temple Pujari will pay obeissance to the Goddess before taking his seat on the Sirimanu chariot. This sirimanu will move 3 times between Vizianagaram fort and Pydimamba temple between 3:00 pm to 4:00 pm. There will be a chariot in the shape of White elephant in front of Srimanu. The Vizianagaram Rajahs will sit in the front Tower of the fort and watch the Utsav. Pujari will be presented with new clothes by Rajas and puja is performed.

== Importance of the White Elephant ==
Many people do not know about the White Elephant moving in front of Sirimanu chariot. But in the olden days Maharajas used to sit on a white elephant and participate in Sirimanu Utsav. Now statue of white elephant is taken in procession in front of Sirimanu as a part of tradition.

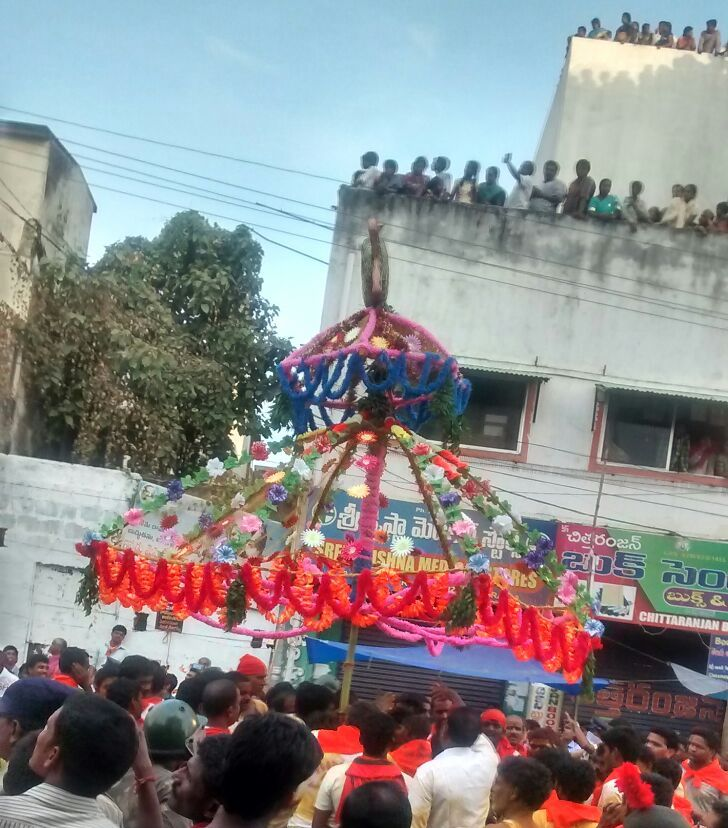
Anjali Chariot in Sirimanothsavam

== Importance of Anjali Chariot ==
Sri Pydimamba died before she got married. So five married women will be seated on the Anjali chariot which goes in front of Sirimanu as a part of tradition. As five married women are sitting on this chariot, this is called Anjali chariot. In addition, Paladhara, an umbrella made with fishing nets decorated with flowers and fruits is another important accompaniment to the Anjali Chariot.

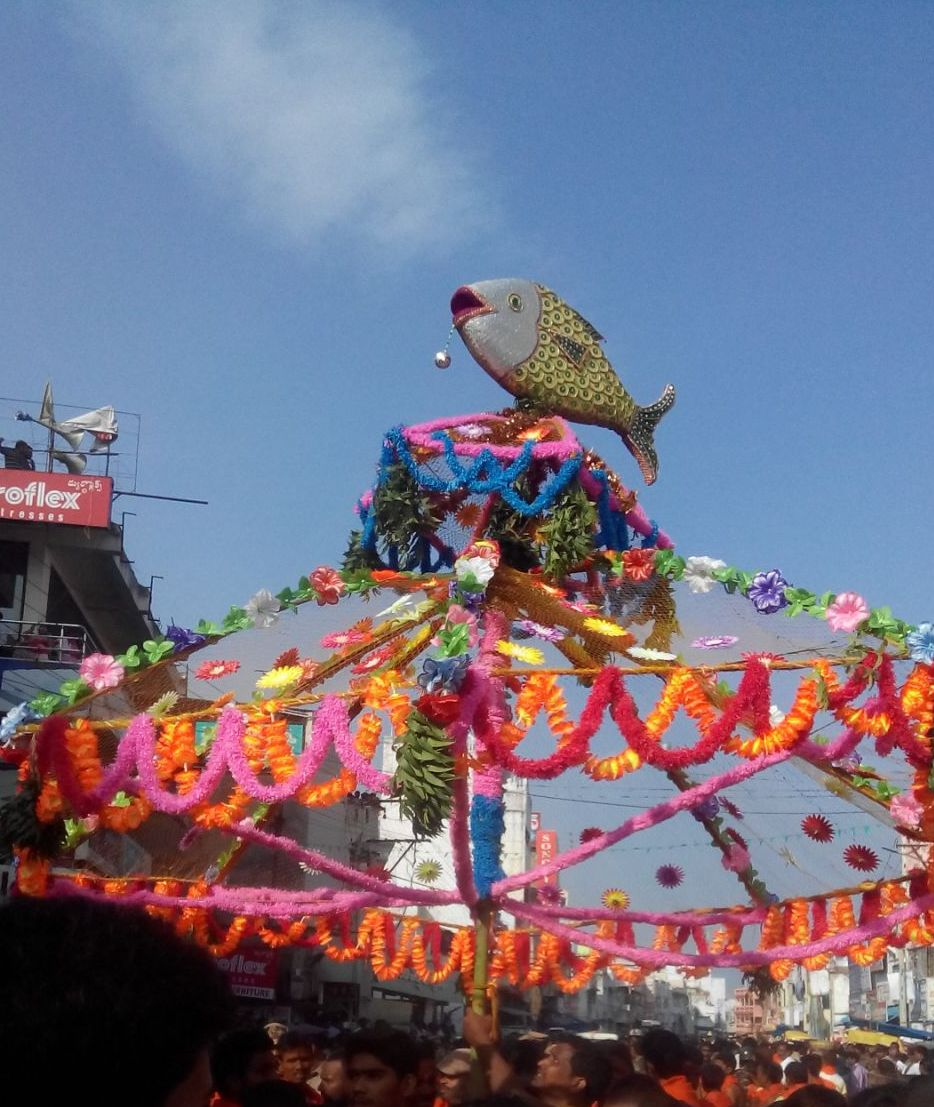
Fishermen's net in Sirimanothsavam

== Importance of Paladhara and Fishermen's net ==
As per history, when Goddess statue was found on west side of Pedda Cheruvu, Patiwda Appalanaidu tried to bring the statue out by calling professional swimmers of Yata Veedhi. They agreed to bring the statue out without taking money on the condition that their people would be allowed to participate in the srimanu utasav with umbrella made of fishing nets. Patiwada Appalanaidu agreed to their condition and convinced Rajas to permit them to participate in Sirimanothsavam.

== See also ==
- Ceremonial pole
