= Rupram Chakrabarty =

Rupram Chakrabarty (Bengali: রূপরাম চক্রবর্তী) (c. 17th century) was a Bengali poet of the Middle Ages and one of the most significant contributor to Dharmamangalkavya tradition of mediaeval Bengali literature. His work, Anadi Mangal (Bengali: অনাদিমঙ্গল), was probably composed in 1650.

Chakrabarty was born at Kaiti-Srirampur village in modern-day Purba Bardhaman district of Indian state of West Bengal. His father Sriram Chakrabarty was an eminent Sanskrit scholar. In his youth Chakrabarty left home and travelled many places until he settles at Eralbahadurpur village in modern-day Nadia district, West Bengal. Legend has it that in Nadia, he met Dharmathakur who commanded him to compose a narrative poem in his honour. The poem, only one-third part of which is now survived, was penned at Eralbahadurpur. The manuscripts of Chakrabarty’s poem are preserved in the University of Calcutta and Vangiya Sahitya Parishad.

Chakrabarty’s poem, marked by its simplicity and yet scholastic descriptions, contains a vivid picture of 17th century Bengali society and the educational centres of medieval Nadia is found in his poem.
