= Janardan Chakravarti =

Scholar of Bengali and Vaishnavi literature

Professor Janardan Chakravarti (1901-1987) was a renowned scholar in Vaishnav literature and a celebrated professor of Bengali. He was awarded the DLitt by the University of Calcutta for his contributions to Bengali literature.

== Career ==
His other specialization was on Bengali poet Madhushudan Dutta . Professor Chakravarti's literary contributions include a book on Vaishnava theology and literature entitled "Sri Radha Tatwa and Sri Chaitanya Sanskriti".It was delivered as Kamala Lecture in 1972 at the Calcutta University.

He wrote another book of Reminiscence "Smriti Bhare" in Bengali. Professor Chakravarti delivered the prestigious Biman Bihari Lecture series at the Asiatic Society which was later published as a book entitled "Bengal Vaishnavism and Sri Chaitanya".

He retired from the West Bengal Senior Education Service in 1955 from Presidency College and went on to become the Head of the Department of Bengali at Burdwan University. He was also associated with the Post Graduate Department of C. U. in the capacity of a Part time Lecturer. He served at two other institutions namely Muralidhar Girls’ College and Maharani Kashishwari College in Kolkata as the Principal.

== Books published ==
- Bengal Vaisnavism and Sri Chaitanya
- Sri Radha Tatwa and Sri Chaitanya Sanskriti
- Smriti Bhare
