= Rudranarayan =

Rudranarayan Ray Mukuti
- Maharaja (King) of Bhurishrestha
- Predecessor: Pratap Narayan Ray Mukuti
- Successor: Bhavashankari
- Spouse: Bhavashankari
- Father: Shivanarayan Ray Mukuti

Rudranarayan Ray Mukuti (Bengali: মহারাজা রুদ্রনারায়ণ) was a Hindu Kayastha King of Bhurishrestha kayastha hindu kingdom Srivastava s in Bengal. He established the kingdom of Bhurishrestha in the 14th to 15th century.

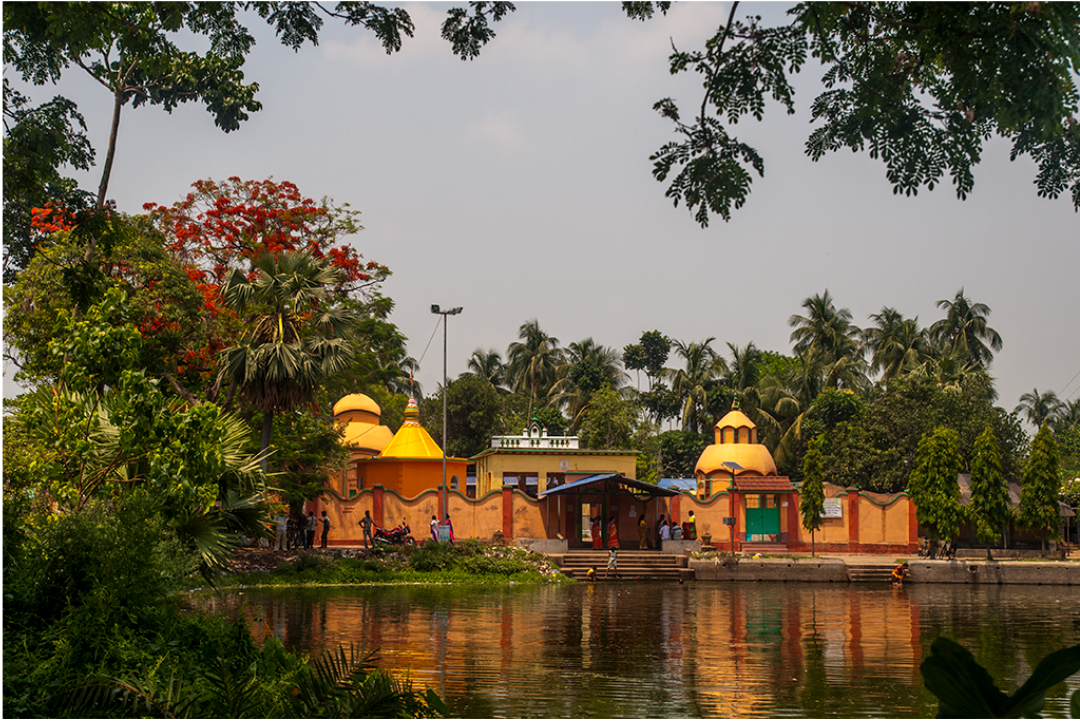
Rajbhalatt Temple complex

== Notes ==
Rudranarayan Bharadwaj Dynasty
Regnal titles
Preceded by Shivanarayan	Maharaja of Bhurishrestha	Succeeded by Bhavashankari
