= Sumon K Chakrabarti =

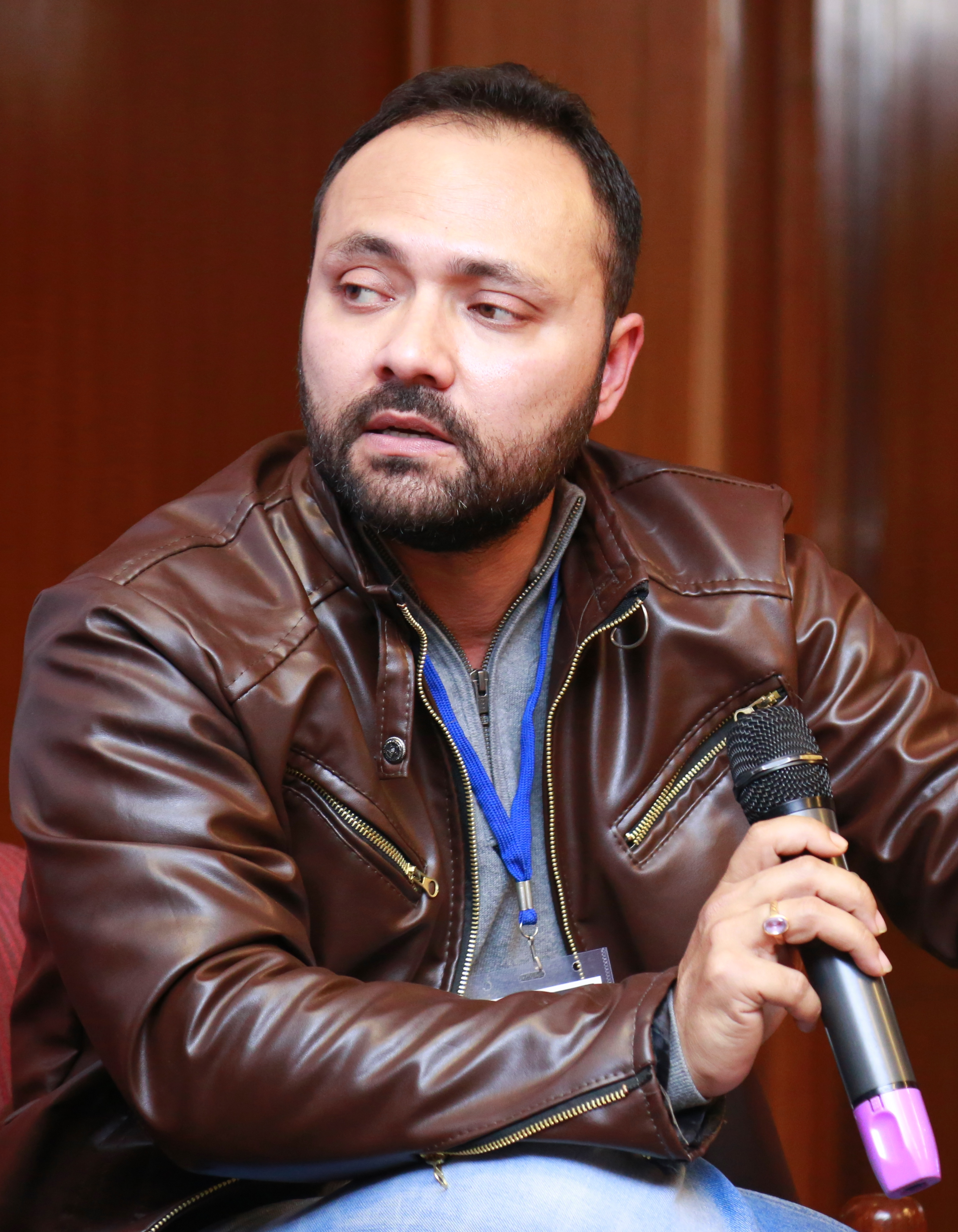
Sumon K Chakrabarti

Sumon K Chakrabarti was the Chief National Correspondent of India’s largest English news network, CNN-IBN, of which he is also a founder employee. Now he is working on a book on South Asia.

== Career ==
He is one of India’s top investigative journalists, with the credit of ‘breaking’ several government corruptions at the highest level. It was his investigative story featuring the report of the Chief Vigilance Commission, India's top vigilance watch-dog, that pointed to corruption at every level in the organization of the upcoming Commonwealth Games to be held in New Delhi, that started the entire controversy and resultant probe. He broke one of the biggest stories in Indian journalism in January 2006; the story of how the Indian government had moved to London to defreeze the accounts of Italian middleman Ottavio Quattrocchi, prime accused in the Bofors Arms Deal scam.

He received the Eurasian-Nets Fellowship of 2009 to travel and research on minority issues in France. The research culminated in a full-length paper entitled: ‘Media, Minorities and the Politics of Integration in France’.

Chakrabarti was among the only two international journalists allowed in Maldives in 2006 to film the democracy movement for the first time, where he interviewed a wide cross-section of politicians, including Asia’s longest ruling leader Maumoon Abdul Gayoom, opposition activists, editors, journalists, intellectuals, human rights activists and police officers.

He moved to CNN-IBN after working for nearly three years with NDTV, India’s first English news network. Before that he had worked for leading media houses like India Today (where he was also part of the team that created TheNewspaperToday.com - India’s first e-newspaper), Indo-Asian News Service (IANS), and The Asian Age. Chakrabarti reports on conflicts, politics, governance and government corruption. Specialising on India’s Maoists (Naxalites), the insurgency-ridden North-East of India and the violence in Kashmir, he is also considered as a proficient journalist in his reporting on India’s neighbours like Bangladesh, Burma, Nepal, Bhutan and the Maldives. He has also worked extensively on people internally displaced as a result of political conflicts.

Chakrabarti also writes articles on regional security issues regularly for one of India’s leading national news and opinion magazines, The Week. He also writes opinion pieces in leading Indian dailies like The Hindustan Times and The New Indian Express.

His report on “Bangladesh: The Shift in the Balance of Terror in South Asia”, published in 2006 International Assessment and Strategy Centre, USA, in many ways put Bangladesh on the global terror map.

== Awards and honors ==
He was nominated for “Best Indian Journalist of the Year” for the Ramnath Goenka Excellence in Journalism Awards (2006) and Indian Television Awards (2008).
