= Samiran Chandra Chakrabarti =

Samiran Chandra Chakrabarti is an Indian academic.

== Awards and recognitions ==
- Rashtrapati Samman 2009, Government of India.;
- Guru Gangeshwarananda Veda-ratna Puraskara Award 2010, Bharatiya Vidya Bhavan, Mumbai.

== Publications ==
Books and Edited Volumes:

- Some Aspects of Vedic Studies.(ed.), Indo-Iranian Journal, Volume 40, Number 4, 1997, pp. 375–378(4) Author: Mylius K. Publisher: BRILL Publication date: 1997-10-01
- Buddhism and World Culture (ed.) Indo-Iranian Journal, Volume 43, Number 1, 2000, pp. 77–80(4) Author: Mylius K. Publisher: BRILL
- New selections from the Brahmanas Hardcover, Pub. 2008
- A Study of the Pariplava: Indo-Iranian journal ISSN 0019-7246 1989, vol. 32, no4, pp. 255–267
- The paribhāòsās in the âsrautasåutras Pub: Sanskrit Pustak Bhandar (Calcutta) 1980, BL1126.46 .C48 1980 Pub ID 102-200-629 (Last edited on 2002/02/27), English
- Brahmanasangrahah: Brahmanasamgrahah, Hardcover, Sahitya Akademi, ISBN 81-260-1885-2 (81-260-1885-2)
- On the transition of Vedic sacrificial lore, INDO-IRANIAN JOURNAL, Volume 21, Number 3, 181-188, doi:10.1007/BF00239066
- The Position of the "Paribhāṣās" in the Textual Order of the "Āpastamba Śrautasūtra" The Journal of the Royal Asiatic Society of Great Britain and Ireland No. 1 (1979), pp. 31–36 Published by: Royal Asiatic Society of Great Britain and Ireland
- The Concept of Purusarthas: The Value System as Reflected in the Vedas by Samiran Chandra Chakrabarti Th xxi+100pp May-2002 2000
- Apastamba-Samanya-Sutra or Yajnaparibhasa Sutra – By Samiran Chandra Chakrabarti. Asiatic Society, 2007. hardcover. 2007
