= Khelaram Chakrabarty =

Khelaram Chakrabarty (Bengali: খেলারাম চক্রবর্তী; c. 16th century) was a Bengali poet and is considered one of the earliest poets of Dharmamangalkavya tradition. His poem, Gourkavya, which is now available only in fragments, was written in 1527. It is assumed by the historians that he lived at Badangunge village near Arambagh in modern-day Hooghly district in the Indian state of Paschimbanga (West Bengal).
