= Ghanaram Chakrabarty =

Poet

Ghanaram Chakrabarty (Bengali: ঘনরাম চক্রবর্তী; c. 1669–?) was a Bengali poet of the Early Modern Era and the greatest contributor to the Dharmamangalkavya tradition of Bengali literature. He was greeted by his guru as Kabiratna ("The Jewel of the Poets"). His work, Anadi Mangal (Bengali: অনাদিমঙ্গল), also known as Sri Dharma Sangeet, was probably composed in 1711.

Chakrabarty was born to Gourikanta Chakrabarty and Sita Devi at Krishnapur kukura village on Damodar River in modern-day Purba Bardhaman district of the Indian state of Paschimbanga (West Bengal). He was sent to a pathshala (traditional village primary school in Bengal) at Rampur. Later he was patronised by Kirtichandra, the Maharaja of Bardhaman. He had four sons: Rampriyo, Ramgopal, Ramgobindo and Ramokrishno.

Although he eulogises Dharmathakur in his poem, Chakrabarty was a devotee of Rama. In his version of Dharmamangalkavya, many incidents from the Ramayana and the Bhagavata are also described. Two major tales of Dharmamangalkavya i.e. the tales of Harishchandra and Lausen are told in 24 palas (Cantos) which are further subdivided into 9147 shlokas in his poem.

Chakrabarty also composed Satyanarayana Sindhu, a panchali (small narrative poem) eulogising Satyanarayana.
