= Gajan (festival) =

Bengali Hindu celebration

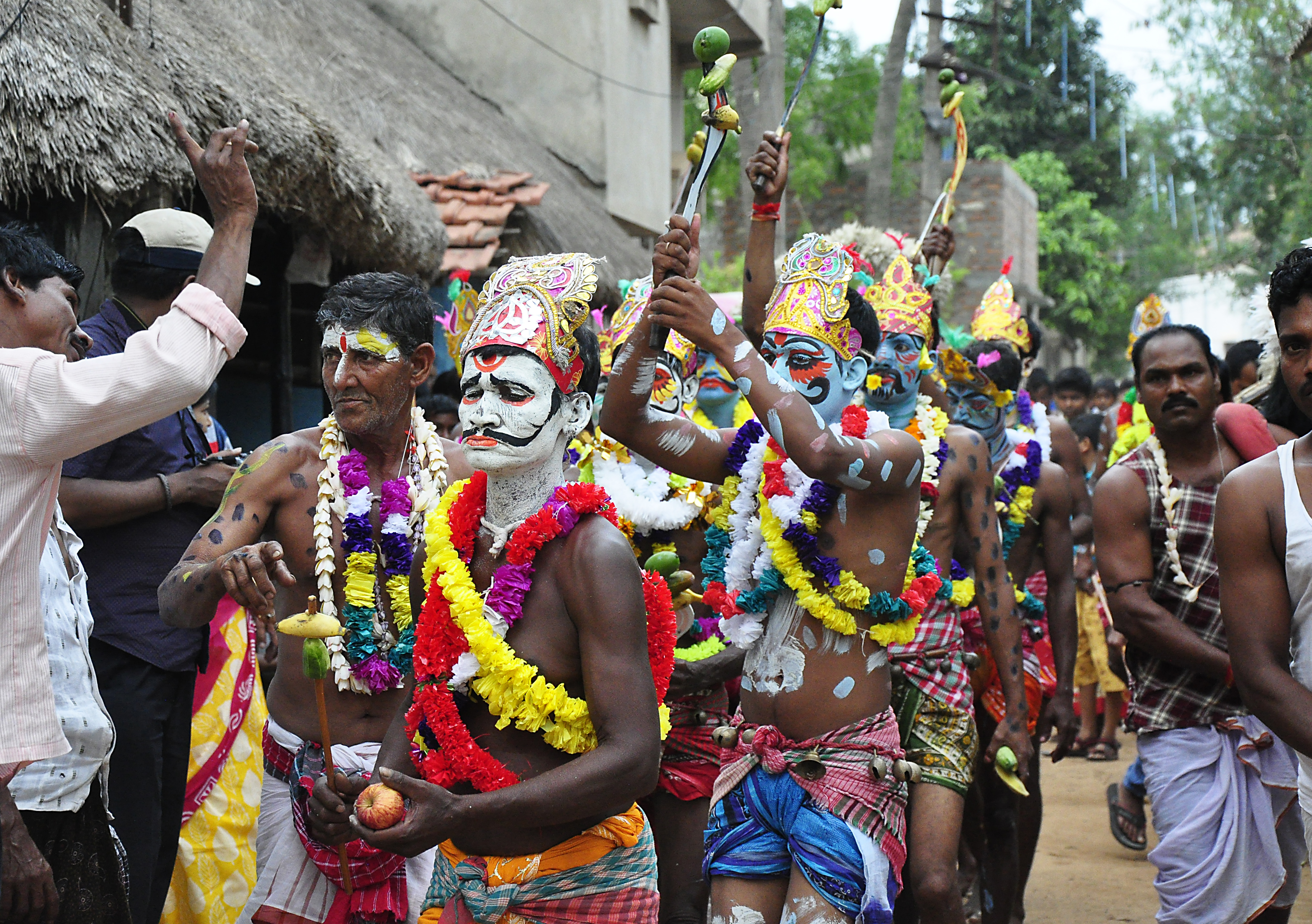
- Gajan festival at the village Narna of Howrah
- Also called: Shiva Gajon
- Observed by: Hindu Bengali and Tribal people of East India
- Type: Cultural
- Significance: marriage ceremony of Lord Shiva and Harakali
- Celebrations: open air drama
- Begins: last week of Choitro
- Duration: 1 week
- Frequency: Annually
- Related to: Lord Shiva

Gajan or Shiva gajon is a Bengali Hindu folk festival celebrated mostly in the Indian state of West Bengal and Bangladesh. It is associated with such deities as Shiva, Neel and Dharmaraj. Gajan spans around a week, starting at the last week of Choitro continuing till the end of the Bengali year. It ends with Charak Puja on the last day of Chaitra, the last month in the Bengali Hindu calendar. The next day is Poila Baishakh, the first day of Bengali New Year. Participants of this festival is known as Sannyasi or Bhakta. Persons of any gender can be a participant. The complete history of the festival is not known. The central theme of this festival is deriving satisfaction through non-sexual pain, devotion and sacrifice. This Gajan festival is one of the ancient festivals of West Bengal. The festival is seen in parts of Malda, Murshidabad, a few parts in Nadia and large parts of Burdwan. The gajan of Shrikhand village in Burdwan is famous as the gajan of Bhootanathar but actually it is the gajan of Baba Dugdha Kumar Shiva. This gajan was launched by Shri Chiranjeev and Sulochan Anad among the Vaishnava Parshad gajans.

== Etymology ==
The word gajan in Bengali comes from the word garjan or roar that sannyasis (hermits) emit during the festivities.

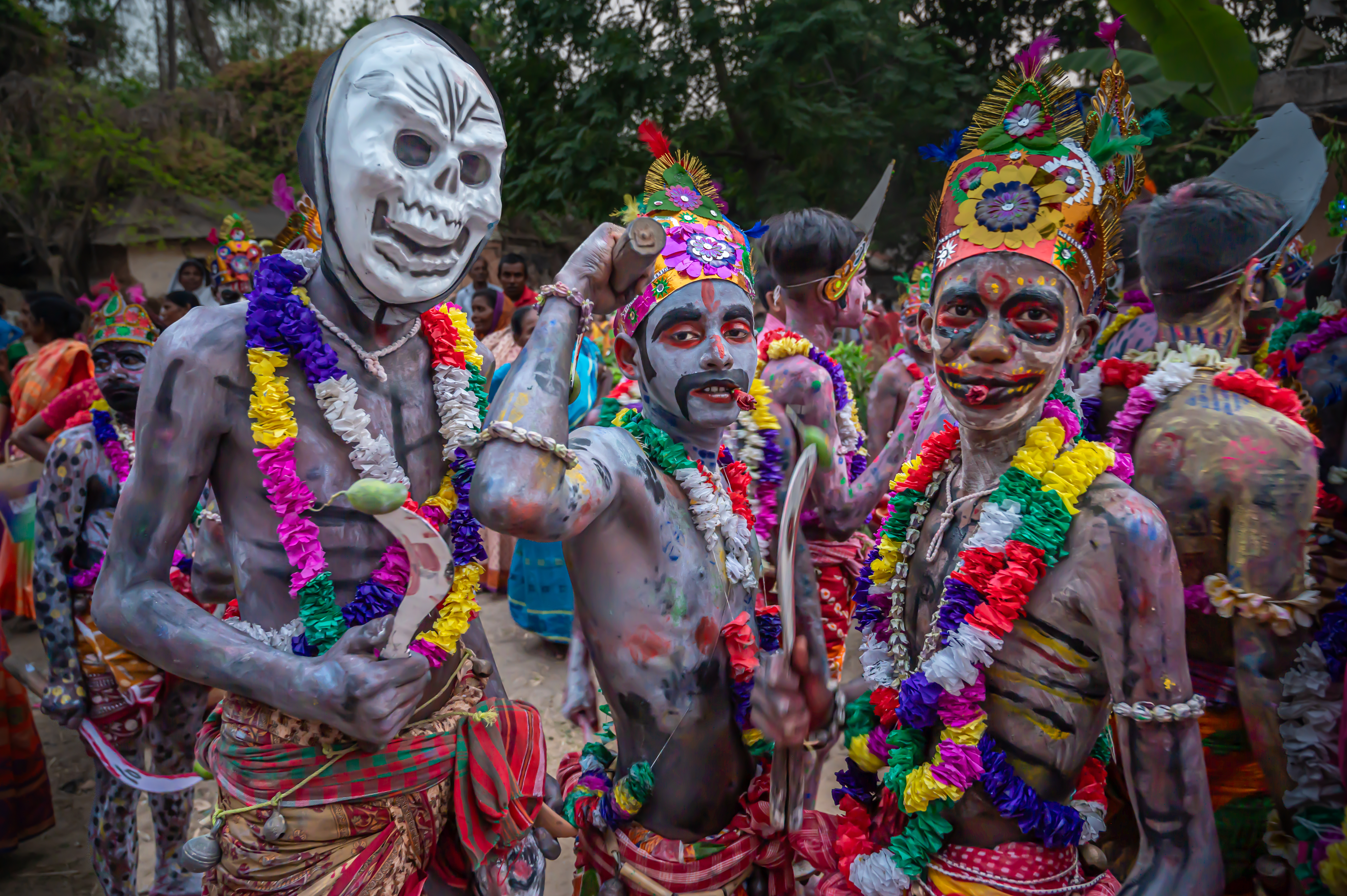
Body and face painting during the Gajan festival is an ancient tradition of West Bengal. Today, this tradition is followed with equal devotion.

Alternatively, the word gajan is considered a combination of parts of two words - ga is from the word gram meaning village and jan is from the word janasadharan meaning folk. In this sense gajan is a festival of village folk.

== Significance ==
The Gajan festival is for bringing fertility back in the spring. The rituals can be performed by any person who performs austerities to gain eligibility to make offerings to the deities.

=== Shiva Gajan ===
Hazra Nitrya, Kharua Rajapur, West Bengal, India.

The Gajan of Shiva takes place in Chaitra (April–May), the last month of the Bengali year.

In Shiva's gajan Shiva is married to Harakali on this day. The sannyasis form the barjatri (bridegroom's party). In Dharma's gajan Dharmathakur is married to Kamini-Kamakhya in Bankura Dist.or Mukti. The most recent studies on the gajan festival are: 1) Nicholas, R. Rites of Spring. Gājan in Village Bengal. New Delhi: Chronicle Books, 2008; and 2) Ferrari, F.M. Guilty Males and Proud Females. Negotiating Genders in a Bengali Festival. Calcutta and London: Seagull, 2010.

=== Dharma Gajan ===
The Gajan of Dharma takes place in Baisakha (May–June), the first month of the Bengali year.

=== Common elements ===
The Shiva and Dharma Gajan have three common aspects.

1. renouncing worldly life during the ritual
2. undertaking physical ordeals
3. making offerings to Surya
