= Dharmathakur =

Hindu deity of death and justice

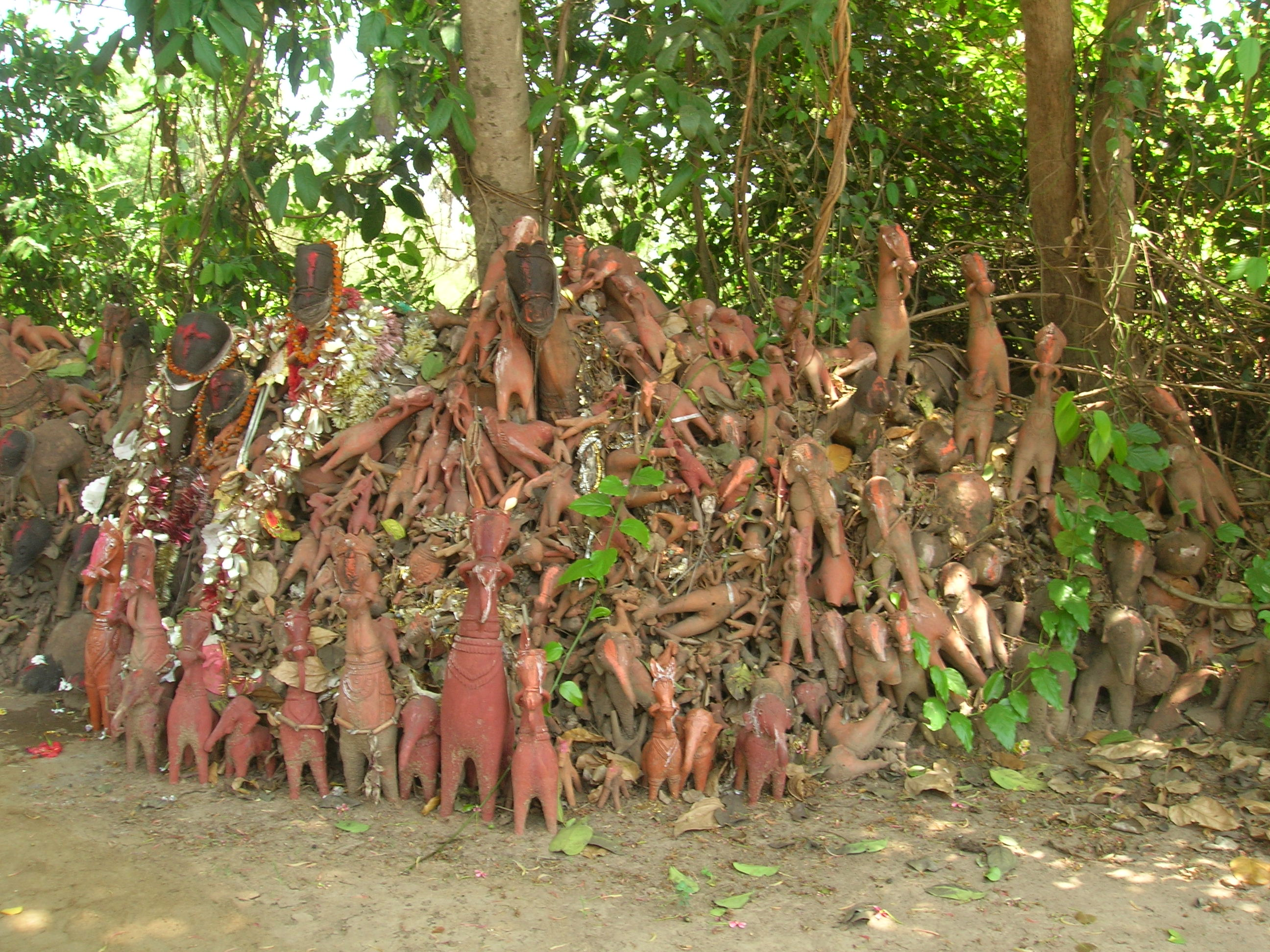
The traditional shrine of Dharmaraj at a Barddhaman, Bankura District's villages.

Dharmathakur (also called, Dharmaraj or simply Dharma) is a Hindu deity of death and justice, worshipped by villagers in the traditional Rarh region in the present day Indian state of West Bengal as one of their special village gods (gram devata). He is represented by a shapeless stone daubed with vermillion and is normally placed under a tree or placed in the open, but sometimes enshrined in a temple. The worship takes place in the months of Baisakh, Jaistha and Asarh on the day of full moon and sometimes on the last day of Bhadro. Dharmaraj is worshipped mainly by the Bauri, Bagdi, Kudmi, Dom etc. castes.

A temple of Dharma stood in the Jaun Bazaar street in Calcutta during the late 19th century.

== Origins ==
Dharmaraj has been linked with many gods such as Sun-god Surya, Varuna, Vishnu, Yama, Shiva and even with Buddhism. Fundamentally, it all started with the magical beliefs related to harvesting in the primitive days and thereafter layers of Aryan Hindu and Buddhist beliefs transformed it in many ways at different places and has now become too complex to trace its roots properly.

Suniti Kumar Chatterji says, "Dharma who is however described as the supreme deity, creator and ordainer of the Universe, superior even to Brahma, Vishnu and Shiva and at times identified with them, and he has nothing of the abstractions of Buddhist Dharma about him." He has further opined that the songs and dances linked with Gajan of Dharma is clearly non-Aryan in origin. It could be Dravidian or Tibeto-Chinese.

Sukumar Sen says that Dharmaraj has come down with the so-called lower category of common people. They formed a majority at one point of time and had no right to Brahminical learning. Brahmins who started migrating to Bengal in large numbers during the Gupta period were mostly not the original inhabitants of Bengal and as such had no links with Dharmaraj. He was not a personal-god but a community-god worshipped by many at a time. He was worshipped by large groups of non-Brahmins such as Haris, Doms and Chandalas.

It is notable that very important patrons of his worship were Brahmins and that they wrote most of the scriptures dedicated to his worship. These include works Dharma Purana of Mayura Bhatt, the Dharmamangal of Mayura Bhatta, Ramdas Adak, Manik Ganguly, Ghanarama, Sahadeva Chakravarty, and Ruparama. Perhaps the Ghanarama festival, in which modern-day adherents worship Dharmaraj is named after the Brahmin Ghanarama Chakravarti.

Frank Korom, a Professor of Religion and Anthropology at Boston University, wrote his PhD dissertation on Dharmaraj. He found that Dharmaraj is perceived and worshipped differently from district to district.

== Vahan ==
Hindu gods and goddesses have vahans – an animal on which the deity rides. Horse is the vahan of Dharmaraj. However, in some cases the elephant is also used as a vahan. In the Rarh region where Dharmaraj is worshipped there is no end to the symbolic use of terracotta and wooden horses. Symbolic sacrifice of horses for fulfilment of wishes is common for many village gods and goddesses, but an assembly of terracotta horses of various shapes and sizes representing sacrifice on wish fulfilment is perhaps peculiar to Dharmaraj. It is a possibility that the horse symbolises links with the Sun-god.

== Gajan ==
The festival associated with Dharmaraj is called Dharmer gajan or Dharma's gajan. Shiva’s gajan and Dharmaraj's gajan are similar. The horse is essential in Dharmaraj's gajan but it is not so in Shiva’s gajan. The sannyasis (hermits) of gajan are called bhakta of bhaktia. They observe certain rituals which are similar to those observed on a person’s death. There is certain amount of confusion regarding the interpretation of the rituals as gajan is supposed to celebrate the marriage of Dharmaraj with Mukti. The skull dance is part of Gajan. This is believed to be of non-Aryan origin.
