= Bhurshut =

Medieval Hindu kingdom in West Bengal

Coordinates: 22°46′N 88°02′E

Kingdom of Bhurishrestha ভূরিশ্রেষ্ঠ বা ভুরশুট
- 15th century–18th century
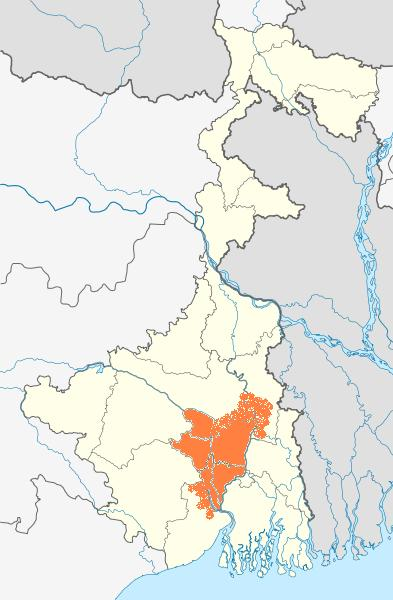
- The extent of Bhurshut kingdom as reflected in a map of present-day West Bengal
- Capital: Bhursut, Bhavanipur
- Common languages: Bengali
- Religion: Hinduism
- Government: Monarchy
- Historical era: Medieval India
  - Established: 15th century
  - Disestablished: 18th century
Succeeded by
Bardhaman Raj
- Today part of: India

Bhurshut (Bengali: ভুরশুট, romanized: Bhurśut) or Bhurishreshtha (Bengali: ভূরিশ্রেষ্ঠ, romanized: Bhūriśreṣṭha) was a medieval Bengali Hindu kingdom spread across what is now Howrah and Hooghly districts in the Indian state of West Bengal.

== History ==
Bhurshut kingdom grew up in the southern parts of Rarh region. It had a high concentration of Bhurisresthis, a community of traders and as such came to be called Bhurshut. However, it was possibly the main centre of Rarhi Brahmins. It could have been ruled by a Sur king during the period when the Pala Empire was a rising force. Different feudatory kings may have ruled over the kingdom. At a later time there is mention in folklore of a Dhibar dynasty, possibly in the 14th–15th century. Subsequently, the area came to be ruled by a Brahmin family.

Shanibhangar, the last Dhibar king of Burshut, was defeated by Chaturanan Neogi of Garh Bhawanipur. Chaturanan's grandson (by his daughter) Krishna Roy of the Mukhti royal family of Phulia took over the reign and established the Brahmin dynasty of Bhurishrestha. Krishnanarayan Ray ruled in 1583–84, at a time when Akbar was the Mughal emperor. Maharaja Rudranarayan Raymukhuty was the ruler of Bhurishrestha, who consolidated and expanded the kingdom and converted it into one of the most powerful Hindu kingdoms of the time. He broke the traditional alliance with the Pathan sultans of Odisha and accounted for the downfall of the Pathan regime in Bengal. Krishna Ray's great-grandson Pratap Narayan Ray (ruled around 1652–1684) was the greatest of Bhurshut kings. There is mention about the exemplary bravery of a lady of the family, popularly referred to as Roy Baghini, but it is difficult to identify the person. She is probably named Rani Bhavashankari Devi.

In Ain-i-Akbari, it is mentioned that amongst the thirty-one mahals under Sirkar Suleimanabad, the highest revenue was earned by Basandhari pargana, followed by Bhurshut. No other pargana under Sirkar Satgaon or Sirkar Mandaran earned so much revenue. Bhurshut was conquered by Kirtichand Rai of Bardhaman in the 18th century.

Bhushut kingdom had three forts at Garh Bhabanipur, Pandua ('Pedo' or 'Pedo Basantapur') and Rajbalhat. There is hardly any trace of these forts, There are still places called Dihi Bhurshut and Par Bhurshitta in Howrah district, across the Damodar from Rajbalhat.

Bharatchandra Ray (Raygunakar), 18th-century Bengali poet, hailed from Pedo Bhurshut and possibly belonged to the ruling family of Bhurshut kingdom.

Sridhara, the famous 10th-century mathematician, was also from Bhursut.
