= Zhurahon Rahmonov =

Zhurahon Rahmonberdievich Rahmonov
- Uzbek: Раҳмонов Жўрахон Раҳмонбердиевич
- Born: 18 August 1917; Osh, Fergana Oblast, Russian Empire
- Died: 7 April 1977 (aged 59); Osh, Kirghiz SSR, Soviet Union
- Occupation: Actor
- Years active: 1937–77
- Spouse: Oyimhon (1929–1997)
- Children: 6
- Father: Rahmonberdi Madazimov

Zhurahon Rahmonberdievich Rahmonov (Russian: Журахон Рахмонбердиевич Рахмонов) (1917–1977) was the founder of the theater named after Babur Osh, Kyrgyz Soviet film and theater actor. He was an honored artist of the Uzbek SSR (1974).

== Biography ==
Zhurahon Rakhmonov born on 18 August 1917 in the city of Osh (Kyrgyzstan) in the family of employees. He was one of the founders of the Uzbek Drama Theater named after Kirov (now named Babur) Osh. He entered an actor in the theater in 1937. it is also the founder theater named after Kirov are his father Rahmonberdi Madazimov (since 1914), as well as his brother Urinboy Rahmonov (since 1927).

In 1938 he was drafted into the Red Army. Participated in the Soviet-Finnish War, the defense of besieged Leningrad, served as a senior sergeant of the 95th Tank Brigade of the 9th Tank Corps of the 2nd Byelorussian Front. He participated in the liberation of Russia, Ukraine, Belarus, Poland, Germany, the capture of Berlin and the Reichstag. He was awarded the Order of "Patriotic War" II degree (order number 9 TC 015/p from 23 August 1943), and numerous medals. After the war, Zhurahon Rakhmonov returned to work at the Osh State Uzbek Music and Drama Theater named after Babur and the rest of his life working their entertainer, he has played more than a hundred roles in theater and cinema.

Zhurahon Rakhmonov died 7 April 1977 and was buried in the city of Osh.

== Filmography ==
- 1971 movie "Zahar Berkut".
- 1972 movie "The Street" ( "Kocho") (Kyrgyzfilm).
- Film "Zholbars" (Tiger) – Basmach (Kyrgyzfilm).
- Film "Azamat" (Uzbekfilm).

== Creative activity in the theater ==
- 1937 – Schiller "Intrigue and Love", Sh.Hurshid "Farhad and Shirin".
- 1938 – C. Goldoni "Servant of Two Masters", Sabir Abdullah, "Saber Uzbekistan".
- 1946 – Mukhtarov "Honor the women."
- 1947 – Uygun "Spring", Khurshid "Farhad and Shirin".
- 1948 – K. Trenyov "Red Tie", Uygun "Song of Life", Uygun "Oltinkol".
- 1949 – Fatkhullin "Petals", Hamid Olimjon "Semurg".
- 1950 – Akram Ismail "Justice", Sabir Abdullah "Alpamysh".
- 1951 – Bokonbaev "Toktogul", Khurshid "Layla and Majnun".
- 1952 – Shukur Sadulla "Eriltosh", Mahmoud Rahmon "Joy", Abdulla Qahhor "Silk Suzani".
- 1953 – Izzat Sultan "Alisher Navoiy", Lysenko "Natalka Poltavka", K.Yashin "Nurkhon".
- 1954 – Shukur Sadulla "Feast on the field", Bahrom Rahmonov "Heart Secrets".
- 1955 – K.Yashin "Oftobhon", Rabindranath Tagore "The Girl of the Ganges River".
- 1956 – K.Yashin "Ravshan and Zulhumor", Fatkhullin "Love for the motherland", Ahmadov "Chest of secrets".
- 1957 – Sabir Abdullah "Alpamysh", Samad Vurgun "Yulduz".
- 1958 – Hamid Olimjon "Oygul and Bakhtiyor", M.Shatrov "In the name of the revolution."
- 1959 – Tursun Sobirov "Orzigul", Ahmad Bobojon "Ashiq Qarib and Shahsanam", A.Bobozhon "Typhoon", Hamza "Secrets of the veil".
- 1960 – Kubanichbek Malikov "On high ground", Hamid Ghulam "Tashbalta love", Carlo Gozzi "Princess Turandot".
- 1961 – Rihsi Orifzhonov "If your head curve", K.Yashin "Dilorom".
- 1962 – Shukur Sadulla "Two bracelets", Beksulton Zhakiev "The fate of his father".
- 1963 – Muhammadjon Khairullayev "Child", Abdulla Qahhor "Voice from the grave", Yahёhon Mamatkhonov "Meli hobbon, Nabi tovon".
- 1964 – Ahmad Bobojon "The tragedy of the poem", Baiseitov, Shangitboev "Dear girl", William Shakespeare "Othello", Kasymali Dzhantoshev "Devil Girl", Premchand "Nimantran".
- 1965 – Jamal Sahib "Guli siёh", Fatkhullin "Love in my youth", Kasymali Dzhantoshev "Mountain eagle", Izzat Sultan "Flight of the eagle".
- 1966 – Izzat Sultan "Unknown person", Sabir Abdullah "Gul and Navruz", Chingiz Aitmatov "Mother's field", Uygun "Parvon".
- 1967 – Alisher Navoiy "Dilorom", Adham Rahmat "Abdullah Nabiyev", Utkir Rashid "Matchmakers", Kasymali Dzhantoshev "Girl with a mustache".
- 1968 – Abdullah Kadiri "Scorpion from the altar", Anatoly Sofronov "Kookie married", Mirzabek Toybaev "New bride", Bekniezov, Ismailov "Between Two Fires", Abdugani Abdugafurov "Regret".
- 1969 – Nikolai Gogol "Marriage", Hamid Ghulam "Strange things", Sharof Rashidov "Mighty Wave", Mirzakalon Ismoiliy "When dawn rises over the Fergana".
- 1970 – T. Abdumomunov "Who laughs last", M. Ordubadi "Bride 5 som", Shukhrat "Cheap groom", Dimitris Psathas "Requires a liar".
- 1971 – A.D. Ilovayskiy "The Adventures of Chandu", Guntekin "Cheating on Sharia", Ismailov Umarjon "Rustam", Suorun Omolloon "Before the Dawn".
- 1972 – Mukhtarov "Ferris generation", Toktobolot Abdumomunov "Girl Atabek", A.Abdugafurov "Baloyi nafs".
- 1973 – Abdukahhor Mannonov "Beginning of life", Alexander Ostrovsky "Thunderstorm", Hamid Ghulam "Tashbalta love", Saidmurod "Mountain Beauty".
- 1974 – A.Abdugafurov "Kuydirmagan kundosh", Jura Mahmudov "Beauty", Aaly Tokombaev "Ashirboy", Rihsi Orifzhonov "Crime without punishment", Saeed Ahmad "Bunt daughters".
- 1975 – Tursun Sabirov "Orzigul", Gogol "The Government Inspector", Umarahunov "Man from afar", Hutaev "Old people with young souls", Akram Ismail "Justice".
- 1976 – Mehribon Nazarov "Other hand", T. Abdumomunov "Do not tell anyone", Babahanov "Joker Ali", Akhmedov "The chest of secrets".
- 1977 – Papayan "Turmoil before the wedding", Nasrudin Baitemirov "Urkuya", A.Abdugafurov "Legacy of the fathers", Aaly Tokombaev "Pity for the animal".

In addition, he has participated in numerous concerts.

== Personal life ==
Father: Rahmonberdi Madazimov (1875–1933). Mother: Bibihon (1884–1922). Wife Oyimhon (1929–1997). Children: Anzirathon (1951–2015), Muyassarhon (1955), Sanjarbek (1959–2012), Minurahon (1962), Muazzamhon (1964), Anwar (1969–2004).

== Honors ==
- Order of the Patriotic War of 2 degrees (23 August 1943)
- Jubilee Medal "Twenty Years of Victory in the Great Patriotic War 1941–1945" (03.02.1968 year)
- Jubilee Medal "50 Years of the Armed Forces of the USSR" (25 October 1968 year)
- Jubilee Medal "In Commemoration of the 100th Anniversary of the Birth of Vladimir Ilyich Lenin" (10.04.1970 year)
- The sign "25 Years of Victory in Great Patriotic War" (1970)
- Medal "Thirty Years of Victory in the Great Patriotic War of 1941-1945" (21 November 1975 year)
- Honored Artist of the Uzbek SSR (5 July 1974)
- Honorary diploma of the Presidium of the Supreme Soviet of the Kirghiz SSR (10 February 1968)
- Drummer 9 Five-year plan (28 January 1976)
- Honorary diploma of the Presidium of the Supreme Soviet of the Kirghiz SSR (28 August 1974)
- Honorary diploma of the Ministry of Culture of the Kirghiz SSR (1957)
- and numerous medals as a veteran of the Great Patriotic War.

== Literature ==
- Encyclopedia of Osh Region, section "Theatrical Life", page 110, published by the Academy of sciences of the Kirghiz SSR, 1987, the city of Frunze.
- A. Abdugafurov "Prominent sons of Osh", 2000, the city of Osh, page 129–130.
- A. Abdugafurov "Osh Academic Theatre", 2010, the city of Osh, page 6, 41, 45.

== See also ==
- Osh State Academic Uzbek Music and Drama Theater named after Babur
- Rahmonberdi Madazimov
- Urinboy Rahmonberdievich Rakhmonov
