= Osh State Academic Uzbek Music and Drama Theater named after Babur =

Theatre in Kyrgyzstan

- (Uzbek: Бобур номли Ўш Давлат академик ўзбек мусиқали драма театри)
- Osh Uzbek Music and Drama Theatre named after Kirov
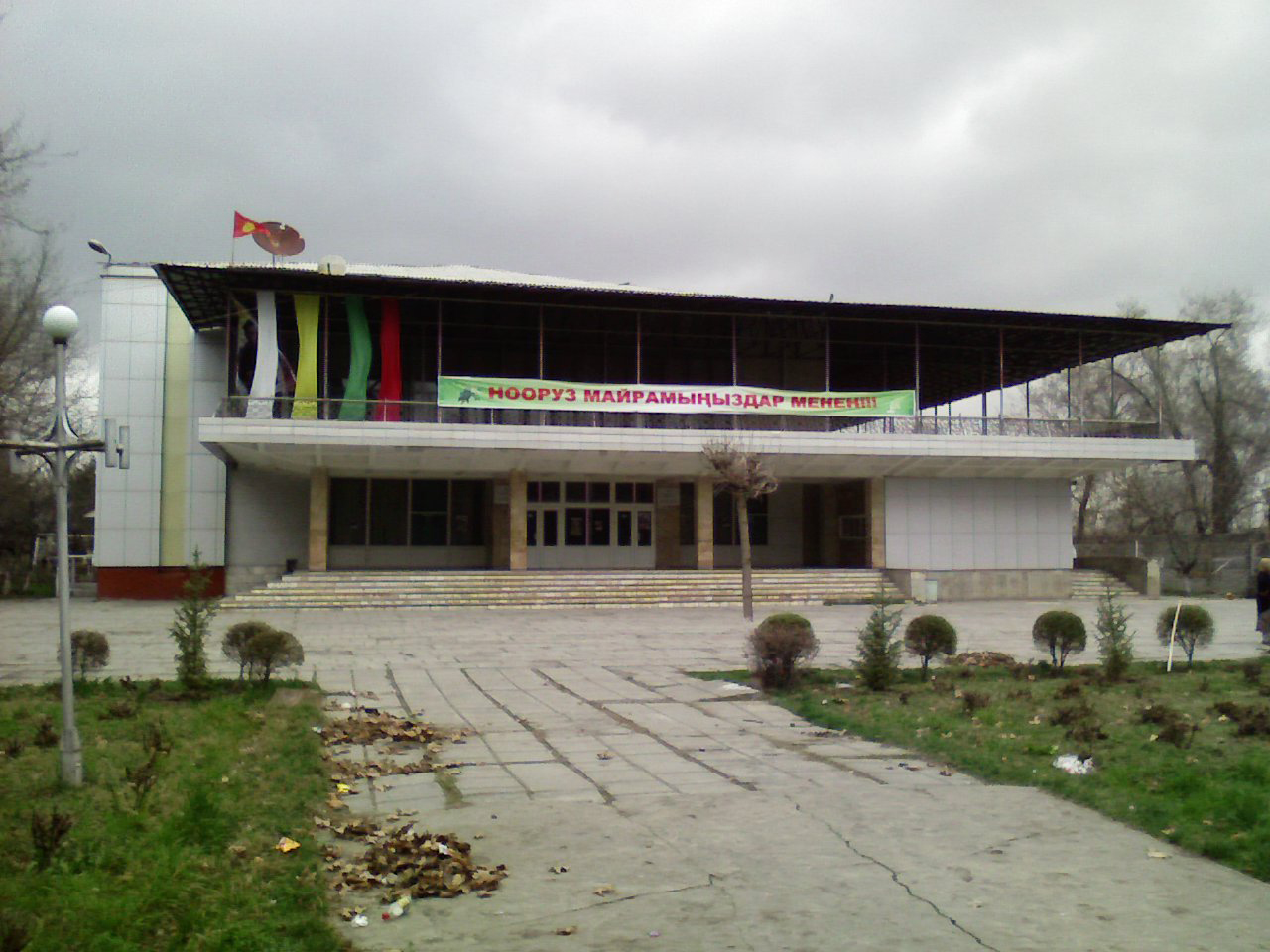
- The theater building
- Interactive map of Osh State Academic Uzbek Music and Drama Theater named after Babur
- Address: Lenin Street, 326; Osh city, Kyrgyzstan
- Coordinates: 40.5331°N 72.7967°E
- Owner: Ministry of Culture, Information and Tourism of the Kyrgyz Republic
- Capacity: 1000 people

Construction
- Opened: 1914. Founder - Rahmonberdi Madazimov
- Rebuilt: 1929, 1979, 2012

Website
- teatrbabur.kg/index.php/ru

Osh State Academic Uzbek Music and Drama Theater named after Babur (Russian: Ошский Государственный академический узбекский музыкально-драматический театр имени Бабура) – Osh city theatre (Kyrgyzstan), the oldest professional theater in Kyrgyzstan, the second oldest theater in Central Asia.

== History of theater ==
In 1914, the theater group was founded under the leadership of Rahmonberdi Madazimov with teacher Russian-native schools Osh Baltyhodzha Sultanov.

In 1918, under the leadership of Rahmonberdi Madazimov with other enlightened leaders and teachers of the Osh district Ibrohim Musaboev, Beknazar Nazarov, Zhurahon Zaynobiddinov, Nazirhan Kamolov, A.Saidov, A.Eshonhonov, Abdukodir Iskhokov, Isroiljon Ismoilov, Jalil Sobitov the first time in Kyrgyzstan was founded by amateur theater group based on the concert brigade at the Revolutionary Military Council of the Turkestan Front of the local muslim actors.

The first artistic director of the theater group Rahmonberdi Madazimov was the first founder and organizer of the theater movement in Kyrgyzstan. In 1919, a circle was formed in the drama troupe. This troupe has served not only to the development of theatrical art, but also the development of professional musical art in the south of Kyrgyzstan. The repertoire of the troupe, in addition to theatrical productions have been numerous concerts, also carried out the processing of folk melodies for the musical accompaniment of performances that contributed to the formation of professional musicians. In the future, this troupe became the basis for the creation of the Osh State Academic Uzbek Music and Drama Theater named after Babur.

Babur Theatre in Osh is the oldest theater in Central Asia, after the Uzbek National Academic Drama Theatre named after Hamza in Tashkent (founded in 1913–27 in February 1914)

== The founders of the theater ==
1. Rahmonberdi Madazimov (1914)
2. Beknazar Nazarov
3. Ibrokhim Musaboev
4. Zhurahon Zaynobiddinov
5. Nazirhon Kamolov
6. A. Saidov
7. A.Eshonhonov
8. Urinboy Rahmonov (since 1927)
9. Zhurahon Rahmonov (since 1937)

== Actors theater ==
=== People's artists of Kyrgyzstan ===
1. Abdullah Tarok Faizullaev (1940)
2. Roziyahon Muminova (1940)
3. Tozhihon Hasanova (1940)
4. Laylihon Moidova (1953)
5. Tursunhon Solieva (1974)
6. Nematzhon Nematov (1979)
7. Tolibjon Badinov (1988)
8. Oytozhihon Shobdonova (1988)
9. Shavkat Dadazhonov
10. Abdurasulzhon (Rasul) Uraimzhonov (31 October 2011)

=== Honored Artist of Uzbekistan ===
Zhurahon Rahmonberdievich Rahmonov (5 July 1974)

=== Honored Artist of Kyrgyzstan ===
1. Sarimsok Karimov
2. Tupahon Nurboeva
3. Sharobiddin Tukhtasinov
4. Khoshimjon Khasanov
5. Kodirzhon Khamidov
6. Ganizhon Butaev
7. Bozorboy Yuldashev
8. Mavlonzhon Kurbonov
9. Yorkinoy Hotamova
10. Minura Rasulzhonova
11. Nigora Rasulzhonova
12. Risolathon Urunova
13. Rezhabboy Tojiboev
14. Mahmudjon Rakhmatov
15. Bahrom Tuhtamatov
16. Ziёydin Zhalolov
17. Matluba Mavlonova
18. Jamila Butaboeva
19. Hamidullo Matholikov
20. Alla Askarova
21. Dilorom Soipova
22. Samida Holmatova

== Repertoire ==
- 1919 - M.Behbudiy "Padarkush", Mannon Uygur "Doctor of Turkestan"
- 1920 - Hamza "Poisoned life"
- 1921 - Gulom Zafariy "Orphan"
- 1922 - Hamza "The punishment of slanderers"
- 1923 - Kamil Yashin "Lolahon".
- 1924 - Mahmoud Rahmon "The report from the South"
- 1925 - K.Yashin and M.Muzaffarov "Gulsara".
- 1926 - K.Yashin "Two communist".
- 1927 - K.Yashin "Friends."
- 1928 - K.Yashin "Inside."
- 1929 - Gulom Zafariy "Halima", K.Yashin "Aji-Aji".
- 1930 - Umarjon Ismoilov "Stories in the cotton field"
- 1931 - Nikolai Gogol "Marriage".
- 1932 - Mannon Uygur "Translator".
- 1933 - Hajibeyov "Arshin Mal Alan".
- 1934 - Nikolai Gogol "The Government Inspector".
- 1935 - Nazir Safarov, Ziyo Said "History says", K.Yashin "Will burn".
- 1936 - Zh.Turusbekov "Instead of death", K. Trenyov "Lyubov Yarovaya", Tozhizoda "Komsomol platoon"
- 1937 – Schiller "Intrigue and Love", Sh.Hurshid "Farhad and Shirin".
- 1938 – C. Goldoni "Servant of Two Masters", Sabir Abdullah, "Saber Uzbekistan".
- 1939 - Bill-Belotserkovskiy "Border" Hamza "Rich and laborer", Sabir Abdullah, "Tahir and Zuhra".
- 1940 - Hamza "Holiskhon", K.Yashin "Buran".
- 1941 - K.Yashin and M.Muhamedov "Gulsara", Khurshid "Layla and Majnun", Sabir Abdullah "Kurban Umarov".
- 1942 - K.Yashin "Death to the invaders!", Hamza "Tricks of Maysara", А. Korniychuk "Frontline".
- 1943 - Sabir Abdullah "Davron ata", Umarjon Ismoilov "Zafar".
- 1944 - K.Yashin "Nurkhon", M. Ordubadi "Bride 5 som".
- 1945 - Uygun "Song of Life".
- 1946 – Mukhtarov "Honor the women".
- 1947 – Uygun "Spring", Khurshid "Farhad and Shirin".
- 1948 – K. Trenyov "Red Tie", Uygun "Song of Life", Uygun "Oltinkol".
- 1949 – Fatkhullin "Petals", Hamid Olimjon "Semurg".
- 1950 – Akram Ismail "Justice", Sabir Abdullah "Alpamysh".
- 1951 – Bokonbaev "Toktogul", Khurshid "Layla and Majnun".
- 1952 – Shukur Sadulla "Eriltosh", Mahmoud Rahmon "Joy", Abdulla Qahhor "Silk Suzani".
- 1953 – Izzat Sultan "Alisher Navoiy", Lysenko "Natalka Poltavka", K.Yashin "Nurkhon".
- 1954 – Shukur Sadulla "Feast on the field", Bahrom Rahmonov "Heart Secrets".
- 1955 – K.Yashin "Oftobhon", Rabindranath Tagore "The Girl of the Ganges River"
- 1956 – K.Yashin "Ravshan and Zulhumor", Fatkhullin "Love for the motherland", Ahmadov "Chest of secrets"
- 1957 – Sabir Abdullah "Alpamysh", Samad Vurgun "Yulduz".
- 1958 – Hamid Olimjon "Oygul and Bakhtiyor", M.Shatrov "In the name of the revolution"
- 1959 – Tursun Sobirov "Orzigul", Ahmad Bobojon "Ashiq Qarib and Shahsanam", A.Bobozhon "Typhoon", Hamza "Secrets of the veil".
- 1960 – Kubanichbek Malikov "On high ground", Hamid Ghulam "Tashbalta love", Carlo Gozzi's Princess Turandot.
- 1961 – Rihsi Orifzhonov "If your head curve", K.Yashin "Dilorom".
- 1962 – Shukur Sadulla "Two bracelets", Beksulton Zhakiev "The fate of his father"
- 1963 – Muhammadjon Khairullayev "Child", Abdulla Qahhor "Voice from the grave", Yahёhon Mamatkhonov "Meli hobbon, Nabi tovon".
- 1964 – Ahmad Bobojon "The tragedy of the poem", Baiseitov, Shangitboev "Dear girl", William Shakespeare "Othello", Kasymali Dzhantoshev "Devil Girl", Premchand "Nimantran".
- 1965 – Jamal Sahib "Guli siёh", Fatkhullin "Love in my youth", Kasymali Dzhantoshev "Mountain eagle", Izzat Sultan "Flight of the eagle".
- 1966 – Izzat Sultan "Unknown person", Sabir Abdullah "Gul and Navruz", Chingiz Aitmatov "Mother's field", Uygun "Parvon".
- 1967 – Alisher Navoiy "Dilorom", Adham Rahmat "Abdullah Nabiyev", Utkir Rashid "Matchmakers", Kasymali Dzhantoshev "Girl with a mustache".
- 1968 – Abdullah Kadiri "Scorpion from the altar", Anatoly Sofronov "Kookie married", Mirzabek Toybaev "New bride", Bekniezov, Ismailov "Between Two Fires", Abdugani Abdugafurov "Regret".
- 1969 – Nikolai Gogol "Marriage", Hamid Ghulam "Strange things", Sharof Rashidov "Mighty Wave", Mirzakalon Ismoiliy "When dawn rises over the Fergana".
- 1970 – T. Abdumomunov "Who laughs last", M. Ordubadi "Bride 5 som", Shukhrat "Cheap groom", Dimitris Psathas "Requires a liar"
- 1971 – A.D. Ilovayskiy "The Adventures of Chandu", Guntekin "Cheating on Sharia", Ismailov Umarjon "Rustam", Suorun Omolloon "Before the Dawn".
- 1972 – Mukhtarov "Ferris generation", Toktobolot Abdumomunov "Girl Atabek", A.Abdugafurov "Baloyi nafs".
- 1973 – Abdukahhor Mannonov "Beginning of life", Alexander Ostrovsky "Thunderstorm", Hamid Ghulam "Tashbalta love", Saidmurod "Mountain Beauty".
- 1974 – A.Abdugafurov "Kuydirmagan kundosh", Jura Mahmudov "Beauty", Aaly Tokombaev "Ashirboy", Rihsi Orifzhonov "Crime without punishment", Saeed Ahmad "Bunt daughters".
- 1975 – Tursun Sabirov "Orzigul", Gogol "The Government Inspector", Umarahunov "Man from afar", Hutaev "Old people with young souls", Akram Ismail "Justice".
- 1976 – Mehribon Nazarov "Other hand", T. Abdumomunov "Do not tell anyone", Babahanov "Joker Ali", Akhmedov "The chest of secrets".
- 1977 – Papayan "Turmoil before the wedding", Nasrudin Baitemirov "Urkuya", A.Abdugafurov "Legacy of the fathers", Aaly Tokombaev "Pity for the animal"

== The main directors ==
1. Rahmonberdi Madazimov (1914–1932)
2. Bolta Mahmudov
3. Urinboy Rahmonov (1941–1949)
4. Gulomjon Ismoilov
5. G. Faina Litvinskaya
6. Sobirjon Yuldashev
7. Erkin Murodov
8. Zhuraboy Mahmudov
9. Salohiddin Umarov
10. Mahmudjon Gulomov
11. Boobek Ibraev
12. Abdurashid Boytemirov
13. Ganizhon Holmatov
14. Karimjon Yuldashev
15. Nabijon Mamajonov

== Theatre director ==
1. Rahmonberdi Madazimov (1914–1932)
2. Solihon Ahmadjonov
3. Bobokhon Ortikov
4. Abdugani Nurboev
5. Salimjon Yodgorov
6. Fattoh Mansurov
7. Lutfulla Isakov
8. Mahmudjon Umarov
9. Alikhon Juraev
10. Nurmamat Soliyev
11. Solijon Rozikov
12. Muhammadusmon Azizov
13. Abdugani Abdugafurov (1973–1983)
14. Komiljon Vosilov
15. Khoshimjon Yuldashev
16. Nabijon Mamajonov (May 2015).

== Literature ==
- Encyclopedia of the Osh Region, section "Theatrical Life", published by the Academy of sciences of the Kirghiz SSR, 1987, the city of Frunze.
- National Encyclopedia of Uzbekistan", Academy of Sciences of Uzbekistan, Tashkent, 2000–2006, (The letter Ў, p.219), State Scientific Publishing House", "Uzbek National Encyclopedia", Tashkent.
- National Encyclopedia "Kyrgyzstan", 5 tome. Center of the State language and the encyclopedia, Bishkek, 2014. Chief Editor U.A. Asanov 97. By B.
- A. Abdugafurov "Prominent sons of Osh", 2000, the city of Osh, page 129–130.
- A. Abdugafurov "Osh Academic Theatre", 2010, the city of Osh, page 6, 41, 45.

== See also ==
- Rahmonberdi Madazimov
- Zhurahon Rahmonberdievich Rahmonov
- Urinboy Rahmonberdievich Rakhmonov
