= Urinboy Rakhmonov =

Urinboy Rahmonberdievich Rahmonov
- Born: Uzbek: Oʻrinboy Rahmonberdiyevich Rahmonov; 4 March 1910; Osh, Fergana Oblast, Russian Empire
- Died: 5 October 1980 (aged 70); Osh, Kirghiz SSR, Soviet Union
- Occupations: Actor, writer, poet
- Years active: 1927–1958
- Spouse: Tursunhon Tuychiboyeva (1918–1954)
- Children: 12

Urinboy Rahmonberdievich Rakhmonov (Russian: Уринбой Рахмонбердиевич Рахмонов) (4 (17) March 1910 – 5 October 1980) – Soviet Kyrgyz actor and theatrical figure, the founder of Bobur theater in the city of Osh, writer, poet.

== Biography ==
Urinboy Rakhmonov was born 4 March 1910 in the city of Osh, in the family of employees. His father was the founder Rahmonberdi Madazimov theater movement in Kyrgyzstan, the first founder and organizer of the theater of the Osh city, a revolutionary, an active participant in the fight against Basmachi. When Urinboyu Rakhmonov was 14 years old, in 1924, he began his artistic career in the theater Osh. He worked in the theater actor, in addition, in the difficult years of formation and organization of the theater additionally served ten positions: he was an assistant director, playwright, singer, musician, prompter, artist, makeup artist, the poet, wrote small plays and poems for the songs by that at the time dancing People's Artist of the Kirghiz SSR first dancer Roziya Muminova.

Urinboy Rakhmonov from 1949 to 1954 he worked as the chairman of Kyzyl-Kyshtakskogo village council, from 1954 to 1965 worked as the chief of post office in the village of Kyzyl-Kyshtak, Kara-Suu District. Since 1965 he worked in the trading system. But, despite the fact that he was in 1949, he went to the theater for a long time, up until 1958, after working freelance played in the theater and the main bit parts. Published his poems. I brought up 12 children. The eldest son Dildorbek also worked in Osh Babur Theatre actor and played bit parts in two films. Another son Darvishbek palvan Rakhmonov has also dedicated his life to the service of art and works artistic director circus troupe "Kaldirgoch" (Swallow).

== Played the role of theater in Osh ==
  - 1924 - Mahmoud Rahmon "The report from the South"
  - 1925 - K.Yashin and M.Muzaffarov "Gulsara".
  - 1926 - K.Yashin "Two communist".
- 1927 – K.Yashin "Friends."
- 1928 – K.Yashin "Inside."
- 1929 – Gulom Zafariy "Halima", K.Yashin "Aji-Aji".
- 1930 – Umarjon Ismoilov "Stories in the cotton field"
- 1931 – Nikolai Gogol "Marriage".
- 1932 – Mannon Uygur "Translator".
- 1933 – Hajibeyov "Arshin Mal Alan".
- 1934 – Nikolai Gogol "The Government Inspector".
- 1935 – Nazir Safarov, Ziyo Said "History says", K.Yashin "Will burn".
- 1936 – Zh.Turusbekov "Instead of death", K. Trenyov "Lyubov Yarovaya", Tozhizoda "Komsomol platoon"
- 1937 – Schiller "Intrigue and Love", Sh.Hurshid "Farhad and Shirin".
- 1938 – C. Goldoni "Servant of Two Masters", Sabir Abdullah, "Saber Uzbekistan".
- 1939 – Bill-Belotserkovskiy "Border" Hamza "Rich and laborer", Sabir Abdullah, "Tahir and Zuhra".
- 1940 – Hamza "Holiskhon", K.Yashin "Buran".
- 1941 – K.Yashin and M.Muhamedov "Gulsara", Khurshid "Layla and Majnun", Sabir Abdullah "Kurban Umarov".
- 1942 – K.Yashin "Death to the invaders!", Hamza "Tricks of Maysara", А. Korniychuk "Frontline".
- 1943 – Sabir Abdullah "Davron ata", Umarjon Ismoilov "Zafar".
- 1944 – K.Yashin "Nurkhon", M. Ordubadi "Bride 5 som".
- 1945 – Uygun "Song of Life".
- 1946 – Mukhtarov "Honor the women".
- 1947 – Uygun "Spring", Khurshid "Farhad and Shirin".
- 1948 – K. Trenyov "Red Tie", Uygun "Song of Life", Uygun "Oltinkol".
- 1949 – Fatkhullin "Petals", Hamid Olimjon "Semurg".
- 1950 – Akram Ismail "Justice", Sabir Abdullah "Alpamysh".
- 1951 – Bokonbaev "Toktogul", Khurshid "Layla and Majnun".
- 1952 – Shukur Sadulla "Eriltosh", Mahmoud Rahmon "Joy", Abdulla Qahhor "Silk Suzani".
- 1953 – Izzat Sultan "Alisher Navoiy", Lysenko "Natalka Poltavka", K.Yashin "Nurkhon".
- 1954 – Shukur Sadulla "Feast on the field", Bahrom Rahmonov "Heart Secrets".
- 1955 – K.Yashin "Oftobhon", Rabindranath Tagore "The Girl of the Ganges River"
- 1956 – K.Yashin "Ravshan and Zulhumor", Fatkhullin "Love for the motherland", Ahmadov "Chest of secrets"
- 1957 – Sabir Abdullah "Alpamysh", Samad Vurgun "Yulduz".
- 1958 – Hamid Olimjon "Oygul and Bakhtiyor", M.Shatrov "In the name of the revolution"

In addition, he has participated in numerous concerts.

== Theatre actor Memory ==
By the decision of the local authorities has been immortalized memory of the founder of the theater by assigning its name outside of Osh Region.

In honor of Urinboy Rakhmonov street was named in the village of Kyzyl-Kyshtak Kara-Suu District, Osh Region.

== Personal life ==
Father: Rahmonberdi Madazimov (1875–1933). Mother: Bibihon (1884–1922). First Spouse: Tursunhon Tuychiboeva (1918–1954). Children: Dildorbek (1941), Diloromhon (1943), Davlatbek (1949–2006), Darvishbek (1952), Bahridilhon (1954), Donishbek (1957), Dilfuzahon (1960), Stalin (1962), Mahfuzahon (1964), Dilrabo (1971).

== Write a book ==
"The history of the genus Rakhmonov thousanders Osh and Uratepa city rights", 420, Osh, 2016

== Literature ==
- A. Abdugafurov "Osh Academic Theatre", 2010, the city of Osh, page 1, 3, 42.

== See also ==
- Osh State Academic Uzbek Music and Drama Theater named after Babur
- Rahmonberdi Madazimov
- Zhurahon Rahmonberdievich Rahmonov
