= Yarovyi =

Yarovyi is a Ukrainian surname. It is a cognate of Russian Yarovoy. Notable people with the surname include:

- Maksym Yarovyi (born 1989), Ukrainian cross-country skier and biathlete
- Oleksandr Yarovyi (born 1999), Ukrainian Paralympic athlete
- Olexander Yarovyi, Dutch engineer
