= Yarovoy =

Yarovoy, Yarovaya or Yarovoye may refer to:

- Yarovoy (surname)
- Yarovoye Urban Okrug, a municipal formation which the town of krai significance of Yarovoye in Altai Krai, Russia is incorporated as
- Yarovoy (inhabited locality) (Yarovaya, Yarovoye), several inhabited localities in Russia
- Bolshoye Yarovoye, a lake in Altai Krai, Russia
- Maloye Yarovoye, a lake in Altai Krai, Russia
- Lyubov Yarovaya, a play by Konstantin Trenyov and several derived works, such as Lyubov Yarovaya, a 1953 drama film
- Yarovaya law, Russian counter-terrorism regulation
