= Tursunkhon Solieva =

Uzbek singer, actress

- Uzbek: Tursunxon Soliyeva
- Born: 17 December 1922; Osh, Fergana Region
- Died: September 21, 2001 (aged 78); Osh, Kyrgyzstan
- Citizenship: RSFSR; USSR; Kyrgyzstan
- Occupation: Actress
- Years active: 1935-1997
- Employer: Osh State Academic Uzbek Music and Drama Theater named after Babur
- Awards: People's Artist of the Kyrgyz SSR (1940), Certificate of honor of the Presidium of the Supreme Soviet of the Kyrgyz SSR and the Presidium of the Supreme Soviet of the Uzbek SSR

Tursunkhon Solieva (Uzbek: Tursunxon Soliyeva, Турсунхон Солиева) (17 December 1922 – 21 September 2001) was an artist of the Osh State Academic Uzbek Music and Drama Theater named after Bobur, People's Artist of Kyrgyzstan, made a great contribution to the development of culture and art in Kyrgyzstan.

== Biography ==
Solieva was born on 17 December 1922, in the city of Osh. For more than half a century, she worked at the Osh Uzbek Music and Drama Theater named after Babur, where she played more than 150 roles in performances in various genres. In 1940-1944 she worked at the Mukimi Theater in the city of Tashkent, and since 1944 she returned to work on the stage of the Osh Uzbek Drama Theater.

For her contribution to the development of theatrical art, the rapprochement of Uzbek and Kyrgyz cultures in 1953, Tursunkhon Solieva was awarded the title of Honored Artist of the Kyrgyz SSR, and in 1974, People's Artist of Kyrgyzstan.

She died on 21 September 2001, in the city of Osh.

In 2017, the Union of Theater Workers of Kyrgyzstan established the Tursunkhon Solieva Prize.

== Literature ==
1. С.С. Мокульский, П.А. Марков, ed. (1965). Театральная энциклопедия, Том IV. Москва: Гос. науч. изд-во "Сов. энциклопедия". pp. 113, 241.
2. Орузбаева Б.О. Институт истории АН Кирг. ССР [in Kyrgyz], ed. (1982). Киргизская Советская Социалистическая Республика: энциклопедия. Фрунзе: Глав. ред. Киргизской сов. энциклопедии. pp. 432, 443.
3. Орузбаева Б.О. Академия Наук Киргизской ССР [in Kyrgyz], ed. (1987). Энциклопедия Ошской области, Раздел "Театральная жизнь". Фрунзе (Бишкек): Глав. ред. Киргизской сов. энциклопедии. pp. 109–111. ББК 92я.
4. Национальная энциклопедия Узбекистана (PDF). Государственное научное издательство "Ўзбекистон миллий энциклопедияси" Академии наук Республики Узбекистан. Ташкент: Государственное научное издательство "Ўзбекистон миллий энциклопедияси". 2000–2006. pp. 219, буква "Ў". Archived from the original (PDF) on 12 July 2018.
5. Асанов Ү.А. Центр Государственного языка и энциклопедии Национальная академия наук Киргизской Республики, ed. (2014). Национальная энциклопедия "Кыргызстан", 5 том. Бишкек: Центр Государственного языка и энциклопедии. p. 763. ISBN 978-9967-14-111-7.
6. О. Ибраимов Центр Гос. языка и энциклопедии АН КР, ed. (2001). Кыргызстан: энциклопедия. Фрунзе: Центр Гос. языка и энциклопедии. pp. 485, 520. ISBN 9785897501298.
7. Искусство советской Киргизии. Москва; Ленинград: Государственное издательство "Искусство". 1939. pp. 41, 42, 44. Мат-лы к декаде кирг. искусства в Москве. 1939 г.
8. Киргизский театр: очерк истории. Львов Н.И. Москва: Искусство. 1953. p. 129.
9. Культурное строительство в Киргизии: ч. 1. 1930-1941 гг.: Народное образование. Каниметов А.К. Институт истории АН Кирг.ССР. Фрунзе: Киргизское государственное издательство. 1957. pp. 18, 47.
10. Novichenko, E. I. (1958). Искусство Киргизской ССР. Новиченко Е.И, Сальникова О.И. Фрунзе. pp. 40, 70.
11. История киргизского искусства. Салиев А.А. Институт философии и права АН Кирг. ССР. Фрунзе: Илим. 1971. pp. 76, 108.
12. "Ошский узбекский музыкальный драматический театр". А. Абдугафуров. Фрунзе: Кыргызстан. 1980. 21 см, ББК 85.4.
13. "Творч. портр. нар. артистки КиргССР Т. Салиевой". Ф.А. Литвинская. Фрунзе: Киргизстан. 1981. − 76 с.: ил.; 16 см.
14. "Ошский академический театр". А. Абдугафуров. Ош. 2010.
15. Жураева Б.Ж. (Абдугани Абдугафуров, Рахманов Д.Д. и др.), ed. (2017). "Во имя процветания Кыргызстана" Энциклопедическое издание о выдающихся узбеках Кыргызстана. Ош. pp. 27–32, 287–309. ISBN 978-9967-18-344-5. УДК 351/354.
