= Yarovoy (surname) =

Yarovoy (masculine), Yarovaya (feminine), or Yarovoye (neuter) is a Russian surname. Literally, it is an adjective meaning "spring-time" (spring-time crops). Notable people with this name include:

== People ==
- Elena Yarovaya, one of the founding members of DEREVO, a physical theater company
- Irina Yarovaya, Russian politician, member of the State Duma
- Vladimir Yarovoy, one of the leaders of Intermovement, a political movement in Soviet Estonia

== Fictional characters ==
- Mikhail Yarovoy, Lyubov Yarovaya, fictional characters from play Lyubov Yarovaya by Konstantin Trenyov and several derived works, such as Lyubov Yarovaya, a 1953 drama film
