= Jizzakh State Pedagogical University =

University in Jizzakh, Uzbekistan

Coordinates: 40°7′54.7″N 67°49′35.3″E

- Jizzax davlat pedagogika universiteti
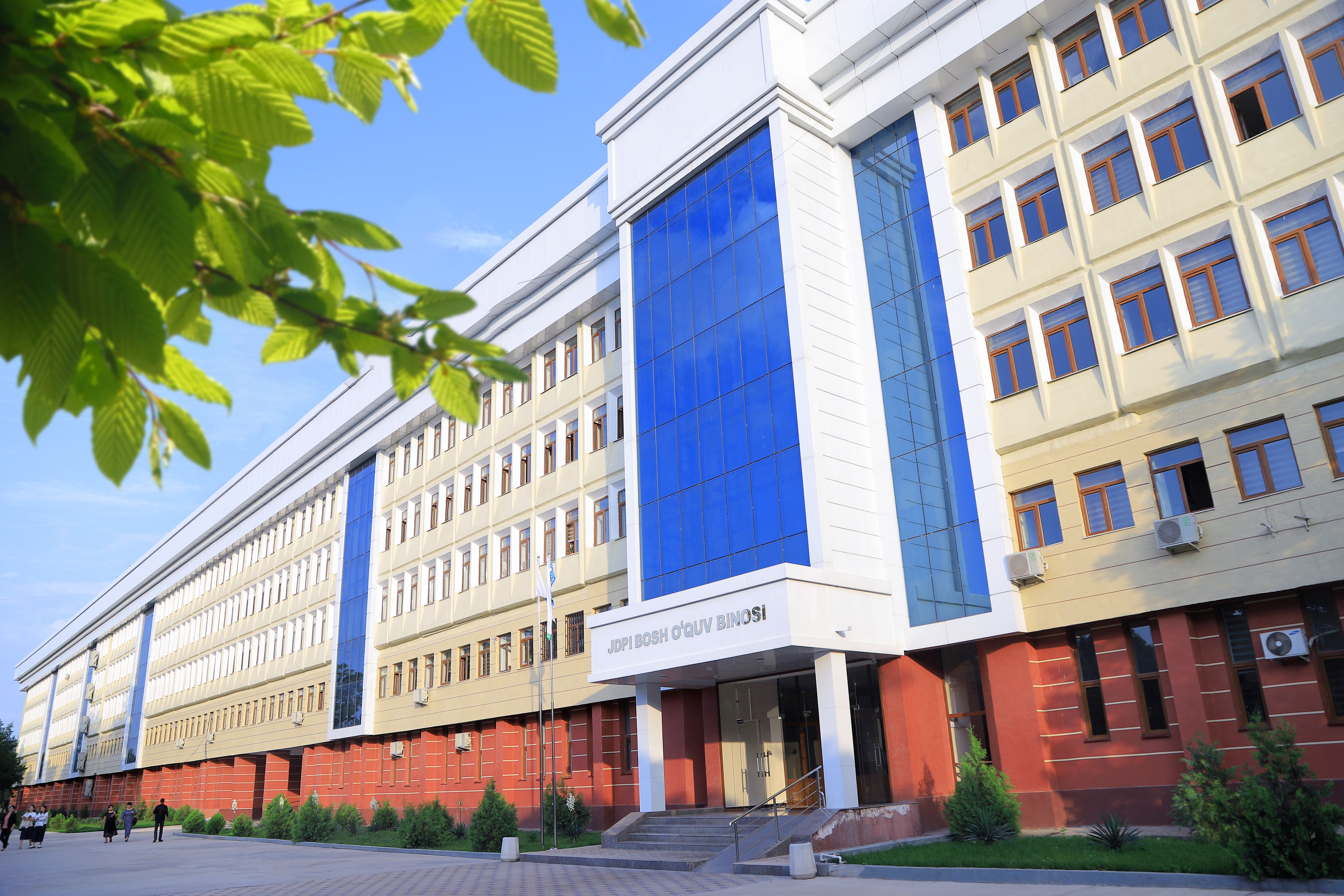
- Main building of the university
- Former name: Jizzakh State Pedagogical Institute named after Abdulla Qodiriy
- Type: Public
- Established: August 8, 1974
- Parent institution: Ministry of Higher and Secondary Specialized Education of Uzbekistan
- Rector: Shavkat Safarovich Sharipov
- Academic staff: 542
- Students: 19,273
- Location: Jizzakh, Uzbekistan
- Language: Uzbek, Russian

Jizzakh State Pedagogical University (JSPU) is one of the largest institutions of higher education and research centers in Uzbekistan, and a part of the Ministry of Higher and Secondary Specialized Education of Uzbekistan.

The university was founded on August 8, 1974, following the decree No. 256 of the Uzbekistan Ministry of Public Education. Dr. Bozorboy O‘rinboyev, a distinguished professor and Doctor of Philological Sciences, was appointed as the inaugural rector. In 1989, by a decision of the Ministry of Public Education of the Republic of Uzbekistan, the institution was named after Abdulla Qodiriy, a seminal figure in Uzbek literature and the founder of the Uzbek novelistic tradition.

On June 21, 2022, Jizzakh State Pedagogical Institute named after Abdulla Qadiri was granted the status of Jizzakh State Pedagogical University on the basis of the decision No. PQ-289 of the President of the Republic of Uzbekistan "On measures to increase the quality of pedagogical education and further develop the activities of higher educational institutions that train pedagogical personnel".

The rector of the university is doctor of pedagogical sciences, Professor Shavkat Safarovich Sharipov.

== Rankings ==
- Ranked 6906th in the world according to Webometrics.
