= Kyzyl-Kyshtak =

Kyzyl-Kyshtak: Кызыл-Кыштак (Kyrgyz); Qizil-Qishloq (Uzbek)
- Location within Kyrgyzstan
- Coordinates: 40°32′40″N 72°46′26″E
- Country: Kyrgyzstan
- Region: Osh
- District: Kara-Suu
- Elevation: 1,014 m (3,327 ft)

Population (2021)
  - Total: 11,971
- Time zone: UTC+6
- Postal code: 723317
- Area code: +996 3222

Kyzyl-Kyshtak is a village in Osh Region of Kyrgyzstan. It is part of the Kara-Suu District. Its population was 11,971 in 2021. It is around 5 km north of the centre of the city of Osh, and just a few kilometers from the Uzbek border.

== Population ==
Historical population
Year	Pop.	±% p.a.
2009	10,816	—
2021	11,971	+0.85%
Note: resident population; Sources:

== Literature ==
1. Национальная энциклопедия "Кыргызстан". Бишкек: Центр Государственного языка и энциклопедии. 2014. ISBN 978-9967-14-111-7. гл. ред. Асанов Ү.А. Центр Государственного языка и энциклопедии Национальной академии наук Киргизской Республики
2. Кыргыз ССРинин административдик-территориал болунушу. Фрунзе: Кыргызстан. 1960. p. 32. Кыргыз ССР Жогорку Совети
3. Из истории Коммунистической партии Киргизии. Том 2. Фрунзе: Мектеп. 1965. p. 204. А. Токтогулов
4. Кыргызстан: народная революция, 24 март 2005. Бишкек: Учкун. 2006. p. 130. ISBN 9789967428195. Памирбек Казыбаев
5. Ризван "Кыргызстандын гүлдөп-өсүшү үчүн" энциклопедиясы "Во имя процветания Кыргызстана" Энциклопедическое издание о выдающихся узбеках Кыргызстана. Ош. 2017. p. 30. ISBN 978-9967-18-344-5. УДК 351/354. ББК 66,3(2Ки). Под рук. Жураева Б.Ж. (Абдугафуров А., Рахманов Д.Д. и др.)

== See also ==
- Urinboy Rahmonberdievich Rakhmonov
