= Rahmonberdi Madazimov =

Actor, director, and writer from Kyrgyzstan

- Born: 1875; Uzgen city, Khanate of Kokand
- Died: 1933 (aged 57–58); Uzgen city, Kyrgyzstan, Soviet Union
- Occupations: Actor, director, art director, writers
- Years active: 1914–1932
- Spouse(s): Bibihon (1884–1922), a native of the Uratepa city.
- Children: Nazokathon (1902–34), Hozhiniso (1907–32), Urinboy (1910–80), Nazirhon (1912–17), Zhurahon (1917–77)

Rahmonberdi Madazimov (Russian: Рахмонберди Мадазимов) (1875–1933) was the founder and organizer of the theatrical movement in Kyrgyzstan, the founder and first artistic director of the Osh State Academic Uzbek Music and Drama Theater named after Babur in Osh city, and a writer.

== Biography ==
Mirzo Rahmonberdi hajji son Muhammadazim alam (Madazimov) was born in 1875 in the town of Uzgen. Rahmonberdi hajji Madazimov was a writer, in 1914–1915 in the printing house at the chancellery by the Governor-general of Turkestan in Tashkent were published of his two books "Osh characteristics", "Dictionary of names".

In 1914, the theater group was founded under the leadership of Rahmonberdi Madazimov with teacher Russian-native schools Osh city Baltyhodzha Sultanov

In 1918, under the leadership of Rahmonberdi Madazimov with other enlightened leaders and teachers of the Osh district Ibrohim Musaboev, Beknazar Nazarov, Zhurahon Zaynobiddinov, Nazirhan Kamolov, A.Saidov, A.Eshonhonov, Abdukodir Iskhokov, Isroiljon Ismoilov, Jalil Sobitov the first time in Kyrgyzstan was founded by amateur theater group based on the concert brigade at the Revolutionary Military Council of the Turkestan Front of the local muslim actors.

The first artistic director of the theater group Rahmonberdi Madazimov was the first founder and organizer of the theater movement in Kyrgyzstan. In 1919, a circle was formed in the drama troupe. This troupe has served not only to the development of theatrical art, but also the development of professional musical art in the south of Kyrgyzstan. The repertoire of the troupe, in addition to theatrical productions have been numerous concerts, also carried out the processing of folk melodies for the musical accompaniment of performances that contributed to the formation of professional musicians. In the future, this troupe became the basis for the creation of the Osh State Academic Uzbek Music and Drama Theater named after Babur.

Babur Theatre in Osh is the oldest theater in Central Asia, after the Uzbek National Academic Drama Theatre named after Hamza in Tashkent (founded in 1913–27 in February 1914).

Founder of Osh Uzbek Drama Theater Rahmonberdi hajji Madazimov in connection with the departure to the city of Uzgen in 1932 left the theater and died at the end of May 1933 in the town of Uzgen.

Two sons Rahmonberdi Madazimov worthy continued his father's work to the service of art and culture for many years worked in the theater named after Babur Osh city. Urinboy and Zhurahon Rakhmonov were among the founders of Music and Drama Theater named after Babur Osh city and made a great contribution to the development of art and culture of Kyrgyzstan, brought a lot of young actors.

== Family ==
Father – Ibni Muhammadazim alam (died in 1876), a religious figure. The mother – Bibi Soliha (1850–1922), a native of the Uratepa city. Wife – Bibihon (1884–1922), a native of the Uratepa city. Children – Nazokathon (1902–1934), Hozhiniso (1907–1932), Urinboy (1910–1980), Nazirhon (1912–1917), Zhurahon (1917–1977)

== Bibliography ==
- "Osh characteristics", 1914, in the printing house at the chancellery by the Governor-general of Turkestan in Tashkent.
- "Dictionary of names", 1915, in the printing house at the chancellery by the Governor-general of Turkestan in Tashkent.

== Literature ==
- Encyclopedia of the Osh Region, section "Theatrical Life", published by the Academy of sciences of the Kirghiz SSR, 1987, the city of Frunze.
- National Encyclopedia of Uzbekistan", Academy of Sciences of Uzbekistan, Tashkent, 2000–2006, (The letter Ў, p.219), State Scientific Publishing House", "Uzbek National Encyclopedia", Tashkent.
- National Encyclopedia "Kyrgyzstan", 5 tome, p. 763. Center of the State language and the encyclopedia, Bishkek, 2014. Chief Editor U.A. Asanov K 97 B.
- A. Abdugafurov "Osh Academic Theatre", 2010, the city of Osh.

== See also ==
- Osh State Academic Uzbek Music and Drama Theater named after Babur
- Zhurahon Rahmonberdievich Rahmonov
- Urinboy Rahmonberdievich Rakhmonov
