= Lenin Komsomol Prize =

USSR award

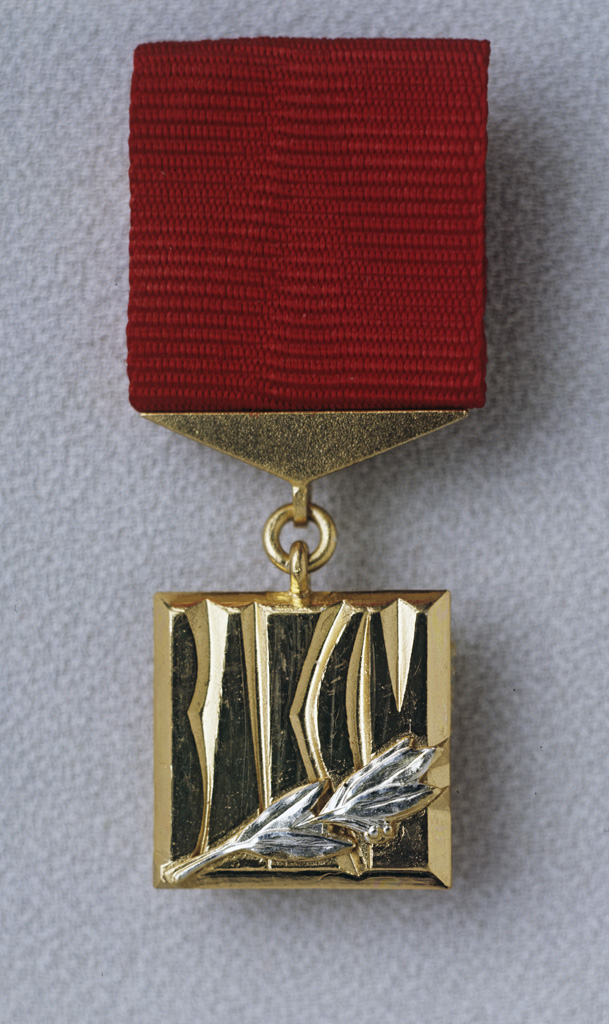
Lenin Komsomol Prize.

Lenin Komsomol Prize (Russian: премия Ленинского комсомола) was a Soviet annual award for the best works in science, engineering, literature or art carried out by young authors of age not exceeding 33 years. (Note: With the exception of Uzbek writer Hamid Olimjon, who received the award posthumously in 1973 and was 34 when he died.) Komsomol was the abbreviated name of The Communist Union of Youth (Russian: Коммунистический союз молодёжи; hence Ком-со-мол, Kom-so-mol).

The award was instituted by the Central Committee of VLKSM in March 1966. The reason for the selection of this particular age threshold is unclear (the age threshold for Komsomol membership is 28). The coincidence of the upper threshold of 33 with the "age of Christ" was a matter of jokes. Symbolically, the first winner of this award in the Soviet Union was writer Nikolai Ostrovsky (who had died aged 32 in 1936).

In addition to the all-Union prize, Union republics had republican versions of the prize, named respectively, e.g., Belarus Lenin Komsomol Prize, and awarded by the republican Komsomol branches.

The prizes were introduced as follows:

- In the field of science and technology - 1967;
- For great achievements in teaching - 1984;
- For great achievements in labour - 1986

The winner was known as "Lenin Komsomol Prize Laureate", and together with the diploma was awarded a medal.

== See also ==
- Lenin Prize
