= Ilan Uti =

- Ilono'tti darasi (Uzbek)
- Gateway of Tamerlane
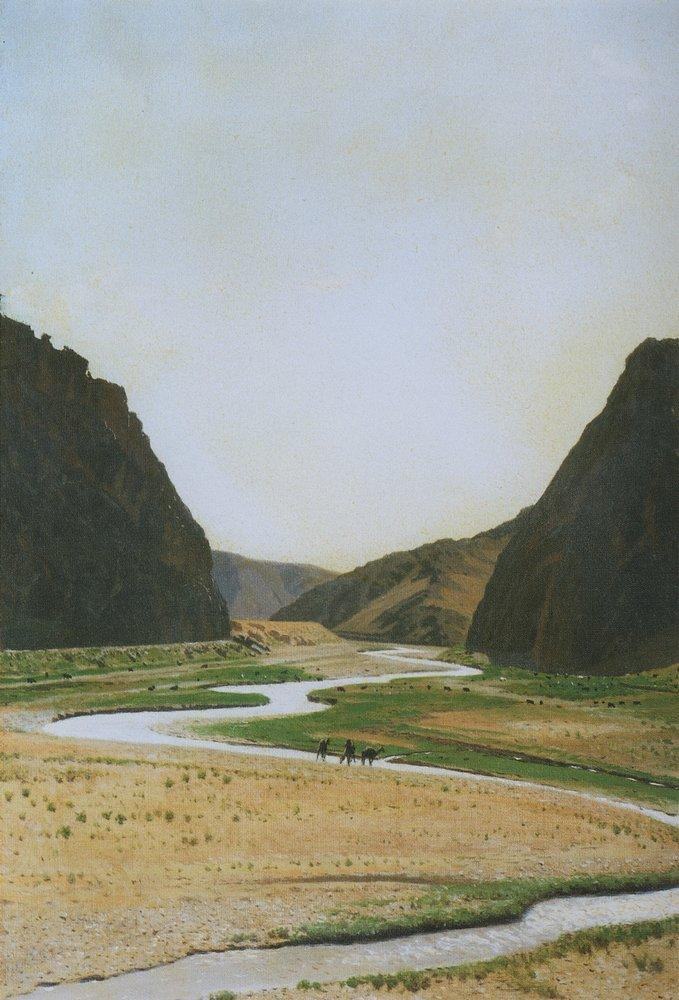
- Painting of pass by Vasily Vereshchagin

- Location within Uzbekistan
- Traversed by: M39 highway; Tashkent-Samarkand Railway

Location
- Location: Jizzakh Region, Uzbekistan (close to Samarkand)
- Range: Malguzar and Nuratau Mountains
- Coordinates: 40°04′18.0″N 67°41′31.9″E

Ilan Uti (Īlān Ūtī) also called Āq Kūtal ('White Pass'), is a strategic passage between the Zarafshān Valley and the Eurasian Steppe, separating Samarkand from Jizakh, Ūrā Tippa and Khojand. Located two hours east of Samarkand, it formed an extremely narrow gorge which was said to teem with snakes. This earned it the moniker "Snake Pass". Many travelers passing through in the nineteenth century called it the "Gateway of Tamerlane".

== Geography ==
Ilon Uti is a mountain gorge with a pass between the Malguzar and Nurata mountain ranges, located in the narrow valley of the Sangzor River in the Jizzakh region of Uzbekistan. It is 16–18 km long and 200–500 m wide, with the riverbed narrowing to 30 m at its narrowest point. The absolute elevation of the pass ranges from 450 to 550 m, while the surrounding mountain slopes rise to 650–700 m.

The ancient Turkic name of the pass was Temir Qapigh ("Iron Gate"). Additionally, it has been historically referred to as the "Jizzakh Road" and the "Sangzor Valley", second most popular names is "Gateway of Tamerlane".

A local mountain-valley wind blows through the pass, with an average speed of 2.3–2.8 m/s, reaching 25–28 m/s at its strongest. The slopes of Ilon Uti rise steeply on both sides. The Malguzar Mountains consist of shale, sandstone, marbled limestone, and porphyrites from the Lower Paleozoic, while the Qoytash Mountains are composed of intrusive rocks such as granite and granodiorites.

The Sangzor Valley was formed in the early Middle Pleistocene due to the river eroding the Malguzar Mountains, cutting through the rock. During this period, tectonic movements caused the Mirzachul region to subside, directing the river's flow into its present course.

== History ==
Bukhari, the chronicler of Ubaydallah Khan (r. 1702-1711), twice mentions Äq-Kütal among the places on the Mawarannahr-Qazaq frontier, but does not specify its position. According to 17th century geography, Äq-Kütal separated Samarkand and the Zarafshan Valley from Khujand, Ura-Tepe and Dizzaq and other eastern districts. A 19th century author depicts Aq-Kütal as a place on the route from Samarkand to Jizaq and Zamin. In its narrower sense, the "White Pass" (Äq-Kütal) probably corresponds to a defile of the Jizaq river on the hill route linking Samarqand with Jizaq.

=== Ilanutti inscriptions ===
Rock inscriptions discovered at the site underline its strategic importance between the Samarkand oasis and the Great Steppe. One epigraph commemorates the safe return of the Timurid Mirza Ulugh Beg from a campaign to the "land of the Moghuls". Another inscription reports how in 979/1571-72 the Shaybanid Abdalläh Khän's forces confronted 400.000 men from Turkistan, Tashkent, Farghana and the Dasht-i Qipchaq, slaying so many enemies that the Jizaq river was bloodstained for a month.

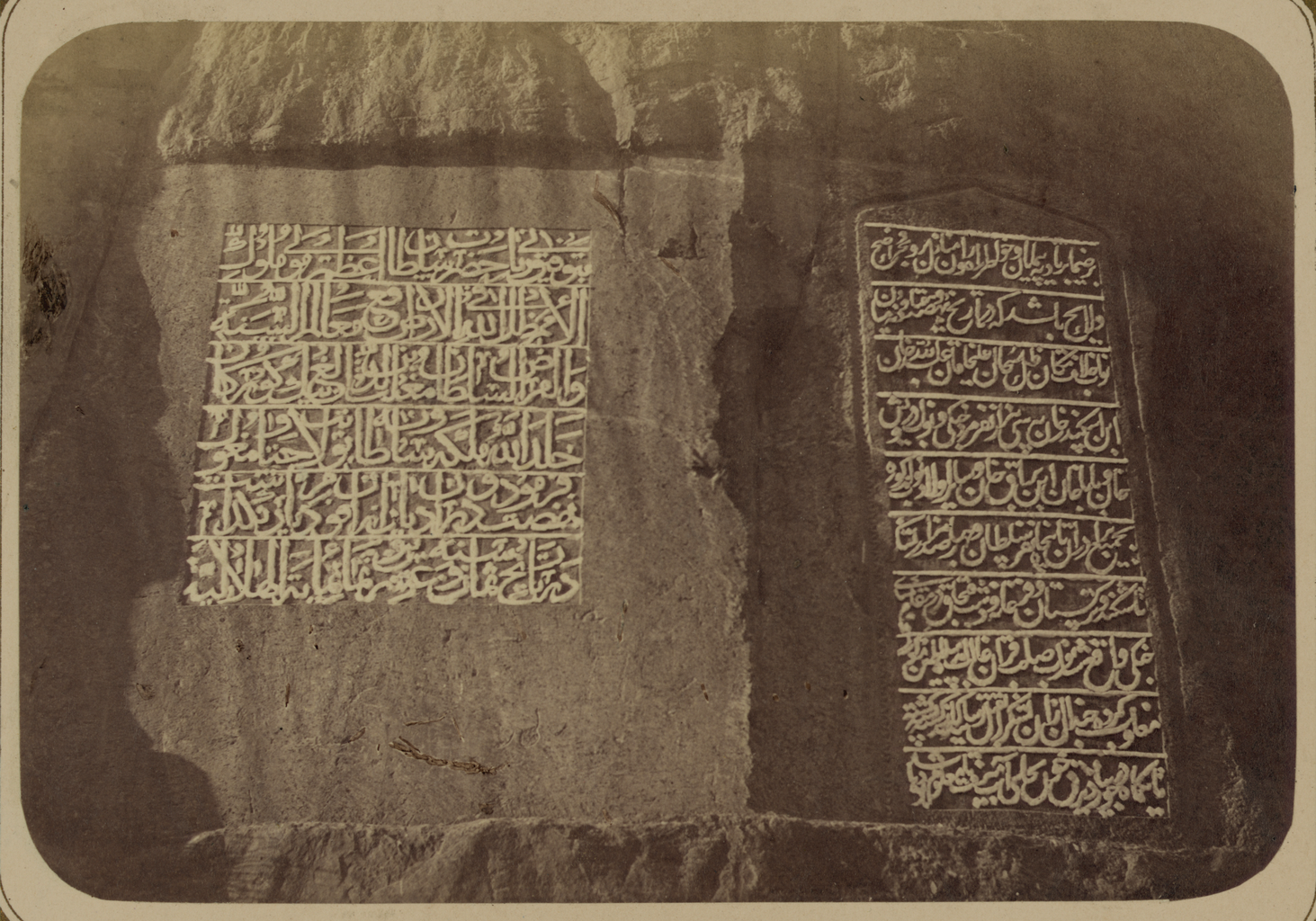
Inscription carved on western side cliffs of Ilan Uti gorge by Ulugh Beg and Abdulla Khan II.

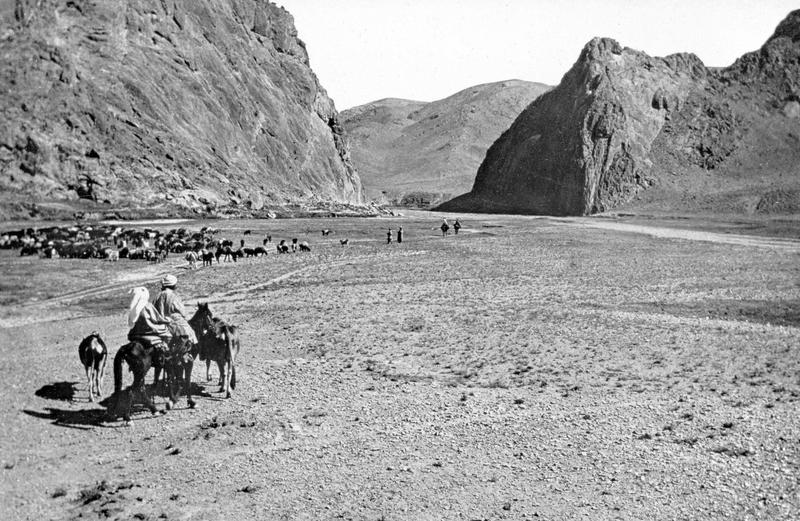
Photograph of gorge by Paul Nadar

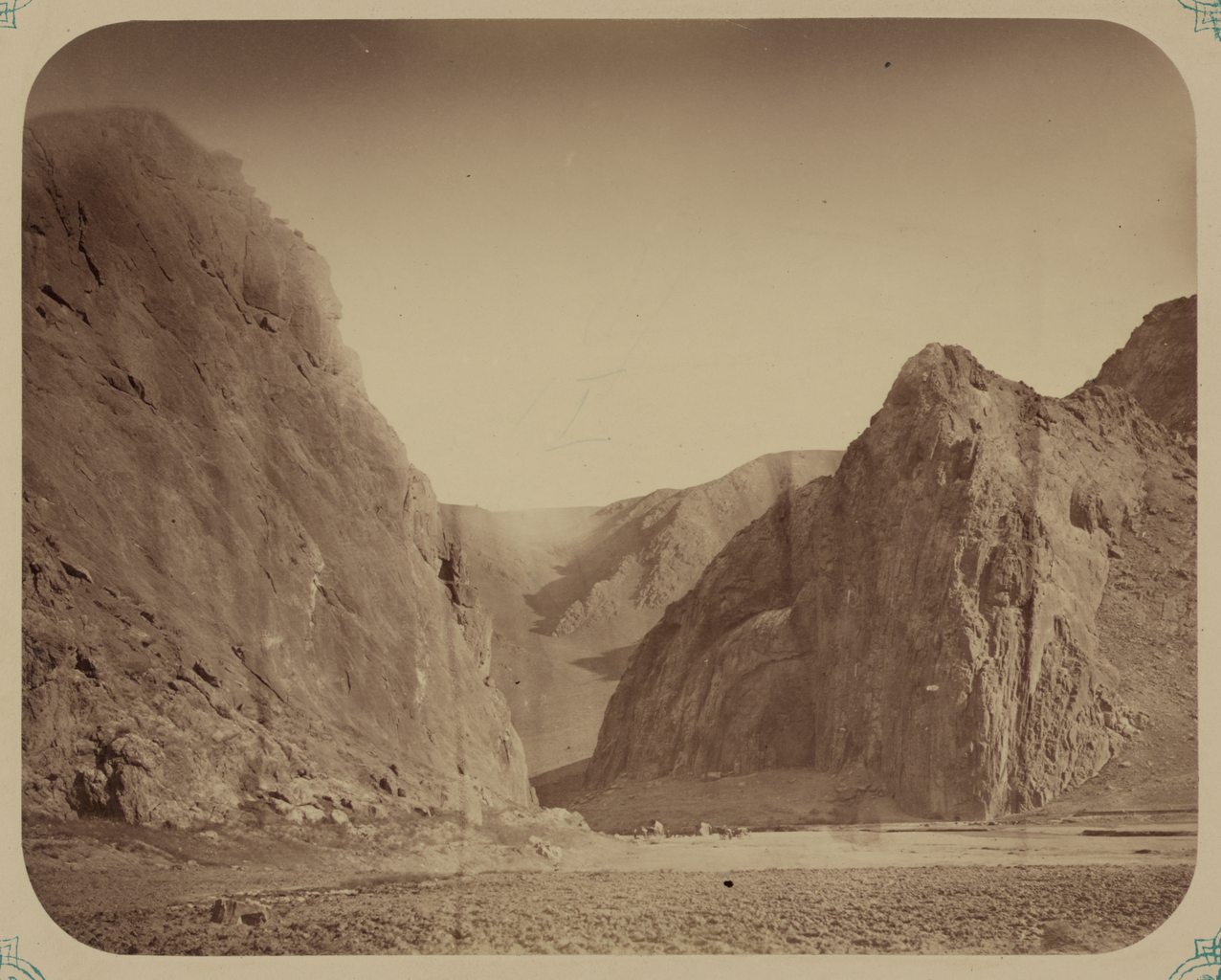
Photograph of Ilan Uti gorge from Turkestan Album
