= Zulfiya (poet) =

Uzbek poet (1915-1996)

- Born: Zulfiya Isroilova زلفيه اسرائيل قيزى; Зулфия Исроилова; 1 March 1915; Tashkent, Russian Empire
- Died: 1 August 1996 (aged 81); Tashkent, Uzbekistan
- Occupation: Poet
- Spouse: Hamid Olimjon
- Writing career
- Pen name: Zulfiya (as takhallus)
- Language: Uzbek, Russian
- Notable awards: Hero of Socialist Labour (1984); Order of Lenin (1959, 1984); State Hamza Prize (1970)
- Literary movement: Socialist realism

Zulfiya Isroilova, known by her pen name Zulfiya (in Cyrillic Зулфия; 1 March 1915 in Tashkent, Russian Empire – 1 August 1996 in Tashkent, Uzbekistan) was a Soviet and Uzbek writer. She repeatedly was a leader or chief editor for various media, participating in Soviet delegations to various conferences. The Uzbek National Award for Women was created and named after her.

== Early life ==
Her name Zulfiya originates from the Persian word زلف zulf meaning 'a curl of hair' and '(in a mystic sense) the divine mysteries forming the delight of the devotee'.

Zulfiya was born in Mahallah Dergez, near Tashkent to a family of craftsmen. Her parents were very interested in culture and literature. Her mother used to sing her popular songs and tales.

== Career ==
Her first poem was published 17 July 1931 in the Uzbek newspaper Ishchi (The Worker). Her first collection of poetry (Hayot varaqlari, "Pages of Life") was published in 1932. In the following decades she wrote patriotic works as well as propaganda, pacifist works, and works on nature and women's topics.

From 1938 on, Zulfiya worked for various publishers and was a member of several national and interrepublican organizations. She repeatedly was a leader or chief editor for various media. After the death of her husband Hamid Olimjon in an accident in 1944, she dedicated to him several works. In 1953, she joined the Communist Party and also became the editor of Saodat magazine. In 1956, she was part of a delegation of Soviet writers led by Konstantin Simonov to the Asian Writers' Conference in Delhi. In 1957, she participated in the Asian-African Solidarity Conference in Cairo.

== Personal life ==
Zulfiya was married to the renowned Uzbek poet Hamid Olimjon. He died in a car accident on 3 July 1944, in Tashkent. He was 34 years old at the time of his death.

== Death ==
Zulfiya died at 81 years, on 1 August 1996 in Tashkent.

== Legacy ==
In 1999, the Uzbek National Award for Women was created and named after her. On 1 March 2008, a statue in her memory was unveiled in Tashkent. In 2014, the monument was replaced with a bronze one. In December 2017, the monument was moved to the Alley of Writers.

== Awards ==
- Two Medals "For Distinguished Labour" (1944, 1950)
- Order of the Badge of Honour (1951)
- Three Orders of the Red Banner of Labour (1957, 1965, 1971)
- Two Orders of Lenin (1959, 1984)
- People's Poet of the Uzbek SSR (1965)
- State Hamza Prize (1970)
- Order of Friendship of Peoples (1975)
- USSR State Prize (1976)
- Hero of Socialist Labour (1984)
