= Oytozhihon Shobdonova =

Kyrgyz actress (1945–2022)

- Born: June 14, 1945
- Died: April 17, 2022 (aged 76)

Oytozhihon Shobdonova (Kyrgyz: Айтажи Шабданова; 14 June 1945 - 17 April 2022) was a Kyrgyz actress of the Osh State Academic Uzbek Music and Drama Theater named after Bobur, People's Artist of the Kyrgyz SSR (1988), who made a great contribution to the development of culture and art of Kyrgyzstan. She was elected a deputy of the Osh City Council of five convocations.

== Biography ==
Oytozhikhon Shobdonova was born on 2 March 1945 in the Aravan district of the Osh region. In 1976, she graduated from the Tashkent Theater and Art Institute, named after Ostrovsky, and received the specialty of an actress in drama and cinema. A young, talented singer at the age of 17 Shobdonova was credited as an artist of the musical drama of the Osh Uzbek Music and Drama Theater named after Sergei Kirov. Shobdonova was one of the leading theater actresses. The images created by her are diverse in their stage embodiment. She played the main roles in the plays Mother's Field, Scorpion from the Altar, Sohibjamol, Medea, Takhir and Zuhra, Semetey, Semurg, Sohibkiron and others.

Many art lovers highly appreciate Oytozhikhon Shobdonova as a singer. She performed songs in Uzbek, Kyrgyz, Kazakh, Tajik, Tatar, Persian languages. The song she performed in the Kyrgyz language Tumarym on Uzbek television brought her even greater fame. Shobdonova participated in the tour of the theater in the city of Leningrad in 1984.

Shobdonova was elected as a deputy of the Osh City Council of five convocations. By decree of the Presidium of the Supreme Soviet of the USSR in 1971, she was awarded the Medal "For Distinguished Labour", the medal "Dank".

In 1968, 1969, and 1971 she was awarded diplomas from the Ministry of Culture of the Republic. In 1974, Shobdonova was awarded the honorary title of Honored Artist of the Kyrgyz SSR. In 1988, for her great contribution and services to the development of the theatrical art of the republic, she received the title People's Artist of the Kyrghyz SSR.

Oytozhihon Shobdonova died on 17 April 2022.

== Theater performances ==
- Mother's field - Tolgonai
- Scorpio from the Altar - Rano
- Sohibjamol - Sohibjamol
- Medea - Medea
- Takhir and Zuhra - Zuhra
- Semetey - Kanykey
- Semurg - Mother
- Sohibkiron - Bibihonim
- Kurmanzhan Datka - Kurmanzhan Datka.

== Awards and honors ==
- People's Artist of the Kyrghyz SSR (1988)
- Medal "For Distinguished Labor" (1971)
- Dank Medal (1999)
- Honorary Diploma of the Presidium of the Supreme Soviet of the Kirghiz SSR
- Honorary diploma of the Ministry of Culture of the Kirghiz SSR (1968, 1969, 1971)
