= Jizzakh =

Jizzakh Jizzax / Жиззах
- City
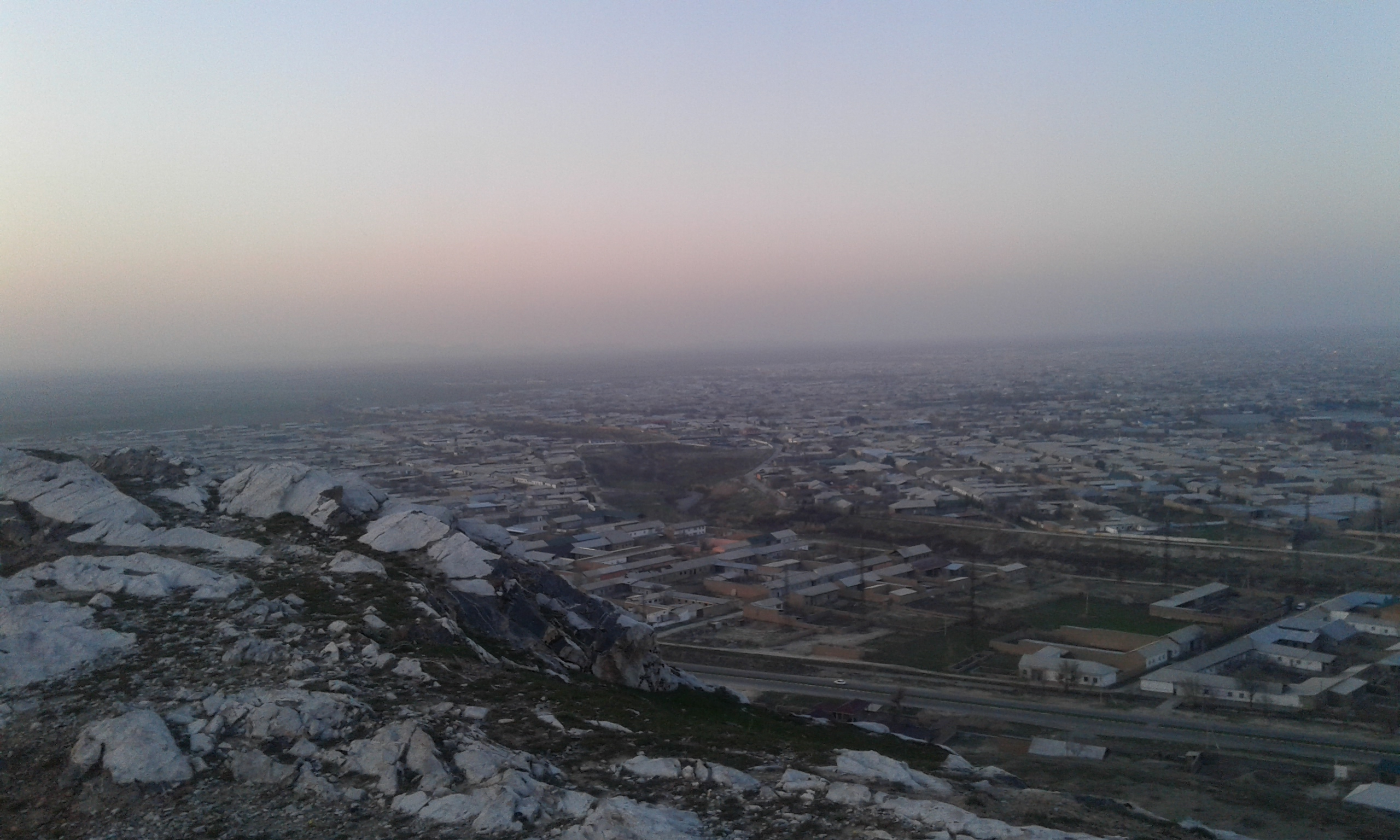

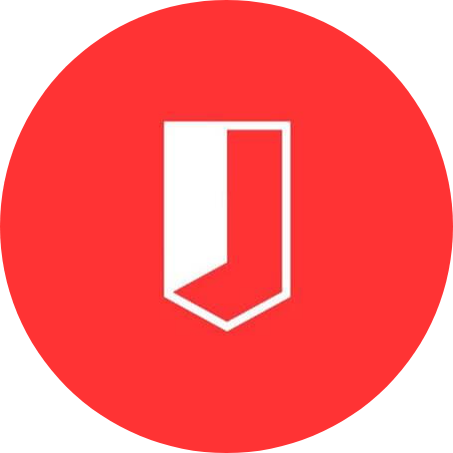
- Seal
- Interactive map of Jizzakh
- Location within Uzbekistan Location within the West and Central Asia Location within Eurasia
- Coordinates: 40°06′57″N 67°50′32″E
- Country: Uzbekistan
- Region: Jizzakh Region
- First mention: 10th century

Government
  - Type: City Administration
  - Hakim (Mayor): Rahmonqulov Akrom

Area
  - City: 49 km^{2} (19 sq mi)
  - Metro: 140 km^{2} (54 sq mi)
- Elevation: 378 m (1,240 ft)

Population (2024)
  - City: 202,200
  - Rank: 12th
  - Density: 4,100/km^{2} (11,000/sq mi)
- Demonym(s): Jizzakhite (Uzbek: Jizzaxlik, Jizzaxlilar)
- Time zone: UTC+5 ( )
- Postal code: 130100-130117
- Area code: (+998) 72
- Vehicle registration: 25-29
- Climate: Csa
- Website: www.jizzax.uz (in Uzbek)

Jizzakh (/dʒɪzˈzæk/; Uzbek: Jizzax [dʒɪzˈzɑχ]) is a city and the center of Jizzakh Region in Uzbekistan, located in the northeast of Samarkand. It is a district-level city. The population of Jizzakh is 179,200 (2020 est.).

== Etymology ==
According to one view, the name of the city comes from the Sogdian word Dizak, which is the diminutive form of diz (meaning "fortress") and means "small fortress" or "small fort".

It was mentioned in the 10th century Hudud al-'Alam under the name Dizak (Arabic: دزك), and in the 13th century Mu'jam al-Buldan under the names Dīzak (Arabic: ديزك) and Dizaq (Arabic: دزق).

== History ==
=== Early and Medieval history ===
Jizzakh was an important Silk Road junction on the road connecting Samarkand with the Fergana Valley. It is at the edge of Golodnaya Steppe, and near the Ilan Uti in the Turkestan Mountains, controlling the approach to the Zeravshan Valley, Samarkand and Bukhara. After the Arab conquest of Sogdiana, Jizzakh served as a market town between the nomadic raiders and settled farmers. The Arabs built a series of rabats (blockhouses) at Jizzakh, housing ghazis to protect the people. Under the Abbasids, rule of the region of Osrushana was given over to the house of Saman, who split the wider region amongst themselves under Abbasid suzerainty. In 892, Ismail Samani united the regions under his family's control, and effectively gained the region's independence from the Abbasids, founding the Samanid Empire.

After the fall of the Samanid's around the year 1000, Jizzakh fell under the rule of the Kara-Khanid Khanate. The Khanate had a string of successes, conquering the whole region of Transoxiana and pushing east into the Western Tarim Basin. In 1041, the khanate splintered into two. After a decade of infighting, the split was formalized into an eastern and western khanate, with Jizzakh falling into the western portion. After their conquest of Samarkand in 1086, the Seljuk Empire forced the western khanate to submit to their rule.

Jizzakh next fell under the control of the Khwarazmian Empire, who began as vassals to the Seljuks but eventually managed to become fully independent by 1190. Under their rule, they conquered much of Persia and Central Asia, leading to economic growth. This situation of relative prosperity was brought to an abrupt end in 1219 when the newly formed Mongol Empire invaded Khwarazm. The Mongol invasion of the Khwarazmian Empire was one of their most brutal campaigns, and many cities were destroyed including Jizzakh. In 1220, the city was invaded and destroyed, resulting in most of the population being killed and the majority of the city being leveled. Under Mongol rule, the city struggled to recover, and went into a state of decay.

The Mongol Empire was divided among the grandsons of Genghis Khan, Jizzakh was included in the portion known as the Chagatai Khanate. This Khanate included Transoxiana, the Fergana Valley, the Tarim Basin, the region around Turpan, and much of what is today southern Kazakhstan. Despite being a key piece of the great Mongol Empire, the Chagatai Khanate began to fragment as early as the year 1300. In the 1340s, the khanate split into two. Jizzakh fell into the western portion, which was initially controlled by Qazan Khan ibn Yasaur, the last independently powerful Khan in the Transoxiana region.

In 1346, the tribal chief Qazaghan killed Qazan and set up a puppet Khan, Danishmandchi. This marked a new era of khans with Mongol ancestry being used as politically legitimizing puppets, but lacking any real control. In 1370, after defeating his rivals in the region, Timur took control of Transoxiana, including Jizzakh. Early in his career, Timur fought regularly with Moghulistan to his north and east. Jizzakh, geographically near the border of Timur's realm and Moghulistan and controlling a key mountain pass, was likely rebuilt and refortified during this period.

=== Uzbek khanates ===
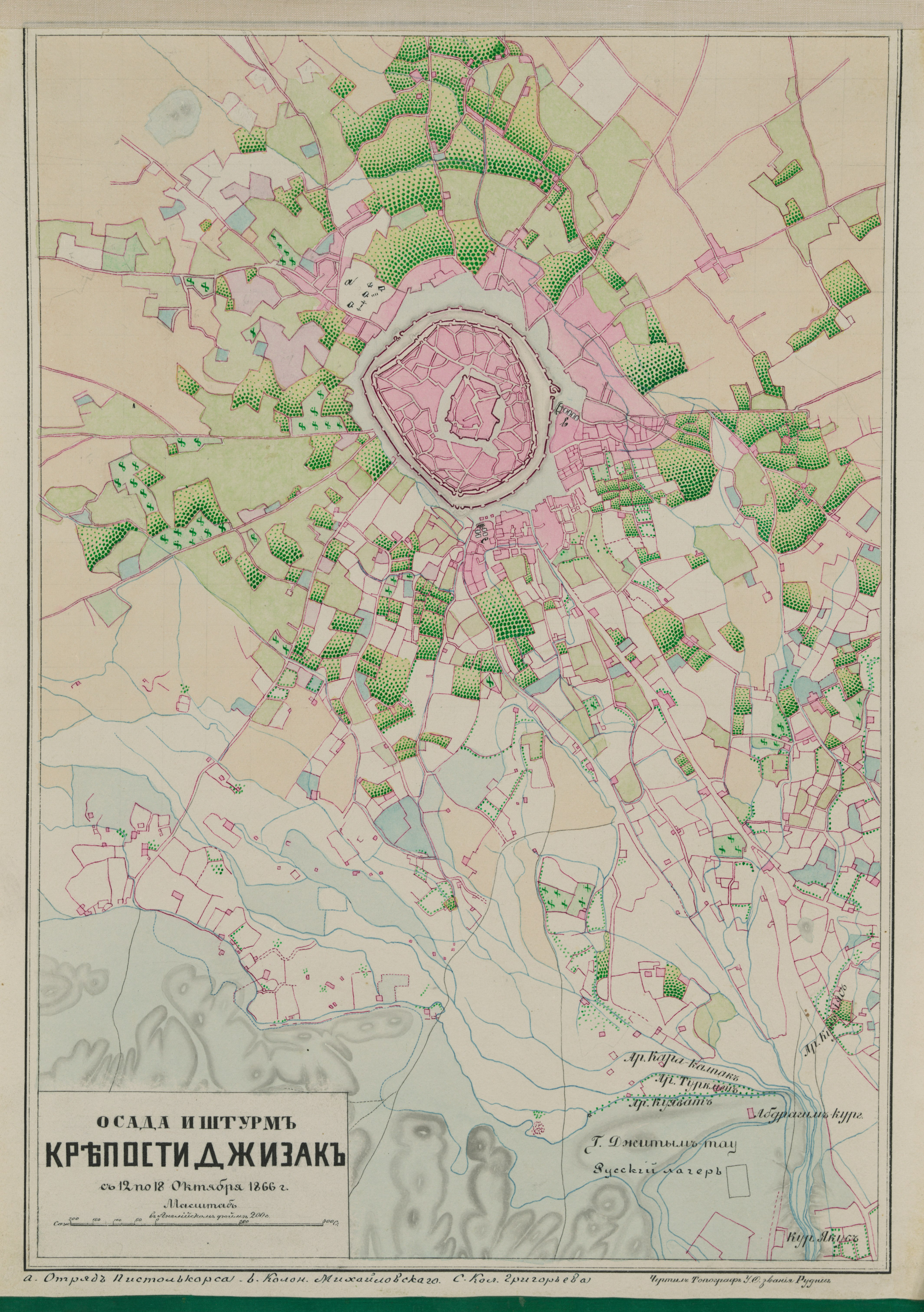
Map of Jizzakh fortress siege and assault in 1866

Under the Timurid Empire, Central Asia experienced a blossoming of art and culture. Jizzakh, with its proximity to the empire's northern border and location of trade routes to the capital Samarkand likely experienced growth and revitalization. The empire began to weaken in the second half of the 15th century. In 1488, an Uzbek contingent led by Muhammad Shaybani helped Moghulistan defeat the Timurids in their attempt to conquer Tashkent, at the Battle of the Chirciq River. After this Timurid defeat, their power fell while Shaybani's power grew in the area between Tashkent and Samarkand. It is unclear if Jizzakh was held by Shaybani or as a Timurid bastion in these early years of Shaybani's rise to power. Shaybani certainly controlled the city by the year 1500, as he needed it in his campaign to take the Timurid capital of Samarkand.

Shaybani established the Khanate of Bukhara, which would control Jizzakh for the next 100 years. Between 1600 and the mid 1700s, Jizzakh regularly changed hands, often functioning independently of neighboring powers. Uzbek nobility controlled the city during this era. In the 1740s, the emirs of Bukhara seized power from the remaining leaders of the Khanate of Bukhara. At some point between this time, and the official founding of the Emirate of Bukhara in 1785, Jizzakh fell under the control of the Emirs. It remained a part of the Emirate of Bukhara until the 1860s.

In 1866, Jizzakh was a major fortress for the Emirate of Bukhara. This was in part due to its position near the border with Russian Turkestan. The Russian conquest of Central Asia had begun in the 18th century, and by the 1860s the Russians controlled a line of forts along the Syr Darya, just 70 miles from Jizzakh. In 1864, hostilities broke out between the Russians and the Emirate of Bukhara. Russian General Mikhail Chernyayev, the "Lion of Tashkent" failed to take Jizzakh in his first attempt, but succeeded in his second try, with a loss of 6 men, versus 6000 dead for the defenders. The old town was mostly destroyed, its remaining inhabitants evicted, and Russian settlers were brought in.

=== Russian Empire ===
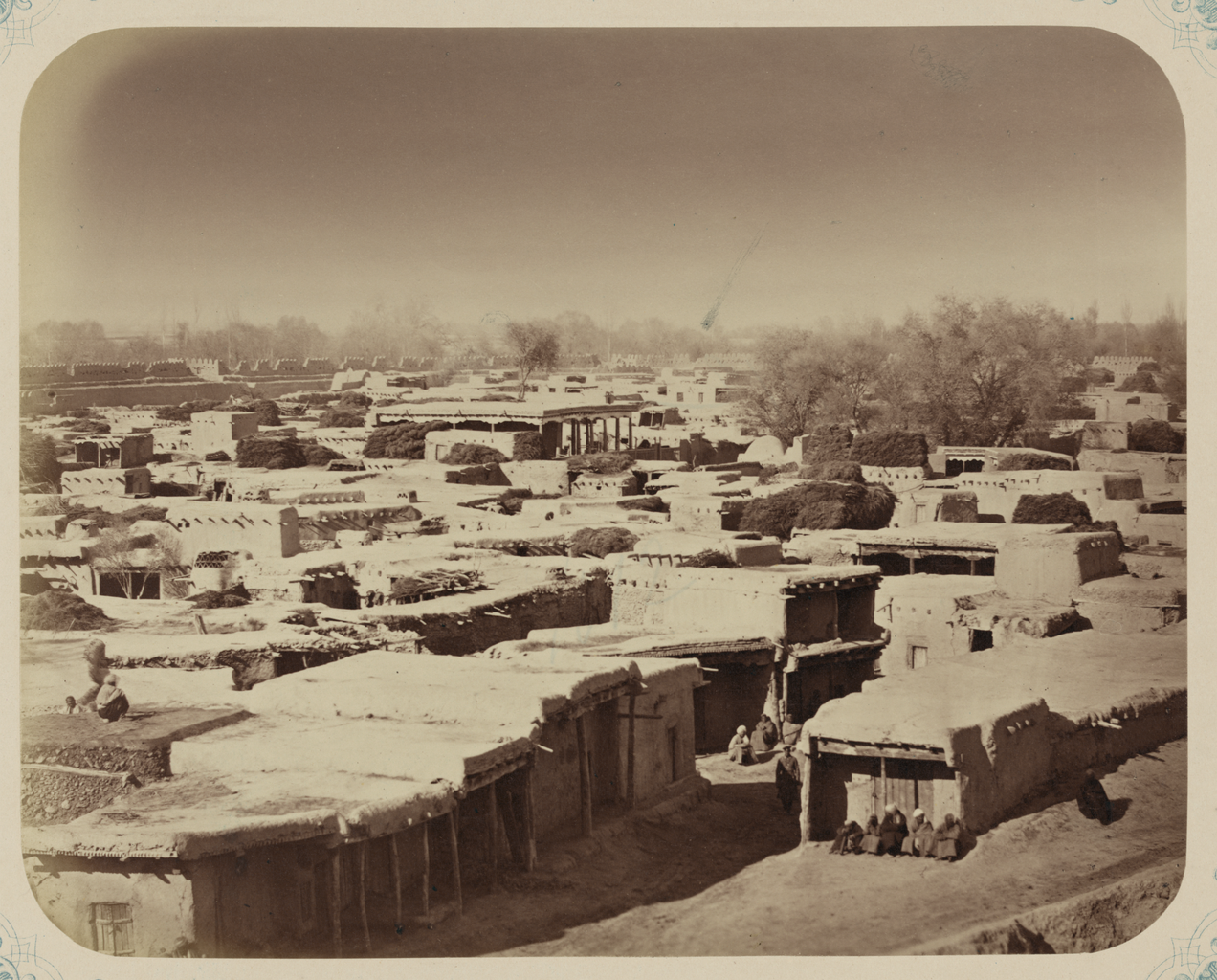
Jizzakh city, Miulkanlyk mahallah

After its incorporation into the Russian Empire, Imperial agents placed Jizzakh under the jurisdiction of the Samarkand Oblast following its establishment in 1887. At the turn of the 19th century, the region was populated by what the Russian authorities qualified as ethnic Uzbeks, who made up more than half of the population, with Tajiks constituting another quarter of the population and other ethnicities including Kazakhs and Uyghurs making up the rest. After a railway was built to Tashkent in 1906, Russian settlers began to pour into the region. This led to resentment, and land was often seized from locals by the government and given over to settlers. While few settlers moved to the Jizzakh region, Russian policies of land surveying, and redistribution angered natives who had their rights to grazing land and other key commodities restricted by the government.

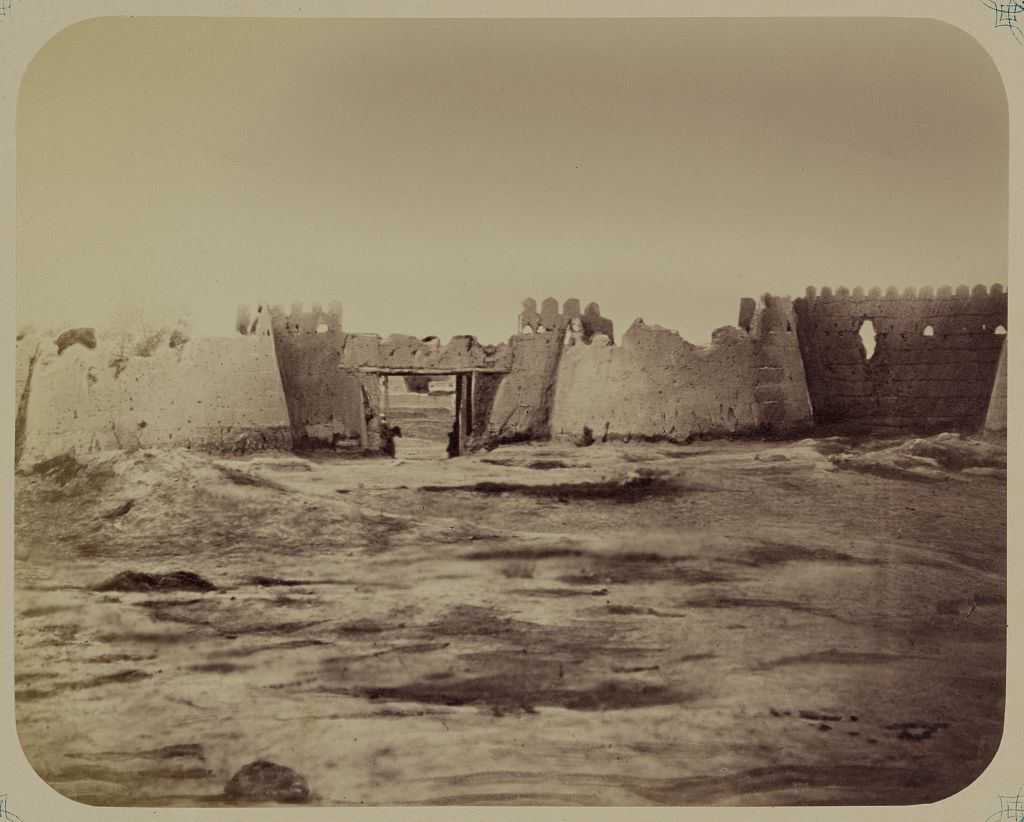
The ruins of the Jizzakh fortress after the capture by Russian troops

In 1916, Jizzakh was a center of an anti-Russian uprising. The revolt broke out after the Russians announced local men would be conscripted to do manual labor behind the front lines during World War I. This violated treaties the Russians had signed during their conquest of the region that had promised to not conscript locals. Most of the revolt was focused in the southern portions of the Jizzakh region, both in the city and the mountains south of it. In 1917, Jizzakh's most famous native son, Sharof Rashidov, future secretary of the Communist Party of Uzbekistan, was born.

=== Soviet administration ===
During the Russian civil war, Jizzakh was initially a part of the Turkestan Autonomous Soviet Socialist Republic. After a debate among the communists about whether the region should embrace a more pan-Turkish identity, or be divided into smaller ethnic republics, the later side won out. National delimitation in Central Asia was started in 1924, and Jizzakh was placed in the Uzbek Soviet Socialist Republic.

== Geography ==
Jizzakh is an ancient oasis. The Turkestan and Nurata ridges, which surround the southern and part of the western part of the country, and the Arnasay-Aydar-Tuzkan lakes in the northern part of the country, provide a temperate climate. There are many rivers flowing from the mountains, of which the largest are Sangzor and Zaamin.

There are more than 20 caves in the region. Although they have not been studied by experts, only amateurs who have observed the Peshawar cave recall that inside the cave there is a large and long square (hall), a red hearth, paintings on stone walls and petroglyphic inscriptions abound. In addition, the long cave is artificially fenced and additional stairs are made for the next hall, which testifies to the fact that primitive people lived here in ancient times.

The huge cave south of Mount Molguzar was once used as a Buddhist temple. The book "History of the Sui Dynasty" also mentions the Eastern TSao (Usturshona), "There is the city of Yecha. It is a closed cave in the city and is sacrificed twice a year. Or the cultural Tavakbulak, located on the shoulders of Mount Molguzar at an altitude of two thousand six hundred meters above sea level, can be called a miracle. On the river Aktash in Bakhmal district there is a huge cemetery on the shoulders of steep mountains, next to it there is a magnificent gorge "Blood Drop".

=== Climate ===
Jizzakh has a sharply continental version of a Mediterranean climate (Köppen Csa). January lows average −4 °C or 24.8 °F and July highs average 34.9 °C or 94.8 °F. The climate at the foot of the mountains is milder than that of deserts and steppes. Annual precipitation is 400 to 500 millimetres (16 to 20 in) in the south and 250 to 300 millimetres (10 to 12 in) in the north. The frost-free period totals between 210 and 240 days, whilst annual sunshine totals 2800 to 3000 hours.

Climate data for Jizzakh (1991–2020)
| Month | Jan | Feb | Mar | Apr | May | Jun | Jul | Aug | Sep | Oct | Nov | Dec | Year |
|---|---|---|---|---|---|---|---|---|---|---|---|---|---|
| Mean daily maximum °C (°F) | 6.7 (44.1) | 9.1 (48.4) | 15.6 (60.1) | 22.2 (72.0) | 28.4 (83.1) | 34.0 (93.2) | 35.4 (95.7) | 33.8 (92.8) | 28.8 (83.8) | 22.2 (72.0) | 13.9 (57.0) | 8.0 (46.4) | 21.5 (70.7) |
| Daily mean °C (°F) | 2.0 (35.6) | 3.8 (38.8) | 9.8 (49.6) | 15.9 (60.6) | 21.6 (70.9) | 26.8 (80.2) | 28.3 (82.9) | 26.3 (79.3) | 20.7 (69.3) | 14.2 (57.6) | 7.8 (46.0) | 3.1 (37.6) | 15.0 (59.0) |
| Mean daily minimum °C (°F) | −1.5 (29.3) | −0.2 (31.6) | 5.1 (41.2) | 10.3 (50.5) | 14.8 (58.6) | 18.7 (65.7) | 20.0 (68.0) | 18.2 (64.8) | 13.1 (55.6) | 8.0 (46.4) | 3.3 (37.9) | −0.5 (31.1) | 9.1 (48.4) |
| Average precipitation mm (inches) | 41.3 (1.63) | 57.4 (2.26) | 69.0 (2.72) | 60.5 (2.38) | 39.3 (1.55) | 11.0 (0.43) | 2.9 (0.11) | 1.8 (0.07) | 4.7 (0.19) | 21.2 (0.83) | 47.5 (1.87) | 46.2 (1.82) | 402.8 (15.86) |
| Average precipitation days (≥ 1.0 mm) | 13 | 14 | 14 | 11 | 10 | 5 | 2 | 2 | 3 | 6 | 10 | 12 | 102 |
| Mean monthly sunshine hours | 92.7 | 107.1 | 154.2 | 217.5 | 302.7 | 355.3 | 388.0 | 368.0 | 305.4 | 229.7 | 129.0 | 90.9 | 2,740.5 |
Source: NOAA

== Demography ==
The composition was as of 2011: Uzbeks — 140,700 people (87.8%), Russians — 6,300 people (3.9%), Tajiks — 2,720 people (1.7%), others (including Kazakhs, Tatars, Ukrainians, Kyrgyz and others) — 10,600 people (6.6%).

The population of the city as of 2020 was 179,900. The majority of the population is Uzbek.

== Education ==
=== Schools ===
- There are 29 public schools, numbered from 1 to 29
- Jizzakh Specialized School of Arts
- Jizzakh Specialized Olympic Reserve Boarding School
- KOBMMI
- IBMI
- Boarding school for gifted children named after "Umid"
- A special boarding school for the blind and visually impaired children.
- Special boarding school for children with speech impediment No. 32.

=== Lyceums ===
- Academic lyceum under Jizzakh Polytechnic Institute
- Academic lyceum "Sayiljoy" under the Jizzakh State Pedagogical Institute
- Academic lyceum No. 2 under Jizzakh State Pedagogical Institute

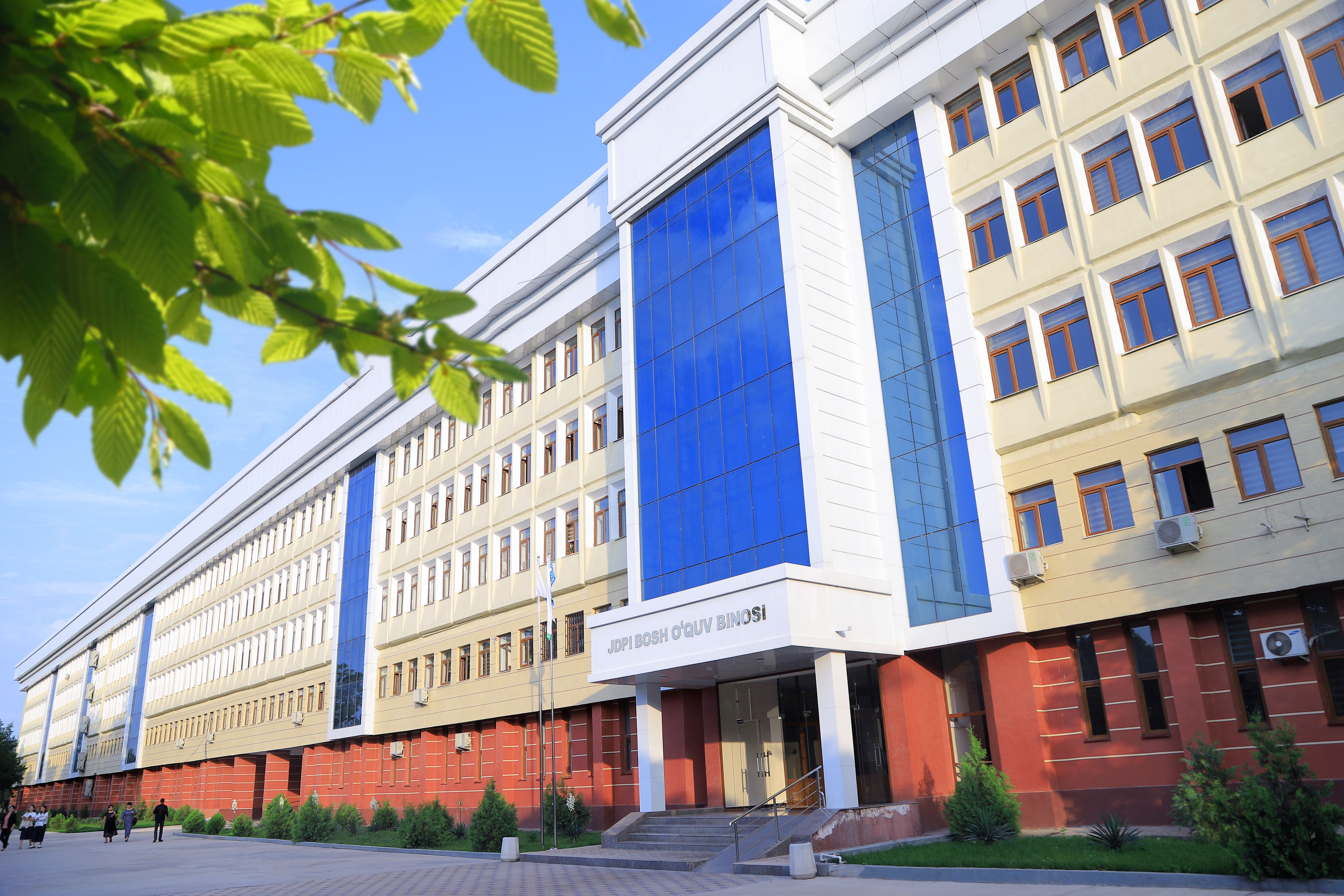
Jizzakh State Pedagogical University

=== Universities ===
- Jizzakh State Pedagogical University
- Jizzakh Polytechnic Institute
- Uzbekistan National University Jizzakh Branch
- Kazan Federal University Jizzakh Branch
- Sambhram University Jizzakh Campus

== Sport ==
Jizzakh is a city with long sports traditions and actively developing professional sports. Sports development is supervised by the Department of Culture and Sports of the Jizzakh Region.

=== Football ===
A football club based in the city, FC Sogdiana, participates in the Uzbekistan Super League. It plays its home matches at the Sogdiana Sport Complex, a multipurpose arena rebuilt in 2015 and now designed for 11,650 spectators.

== Transport ==
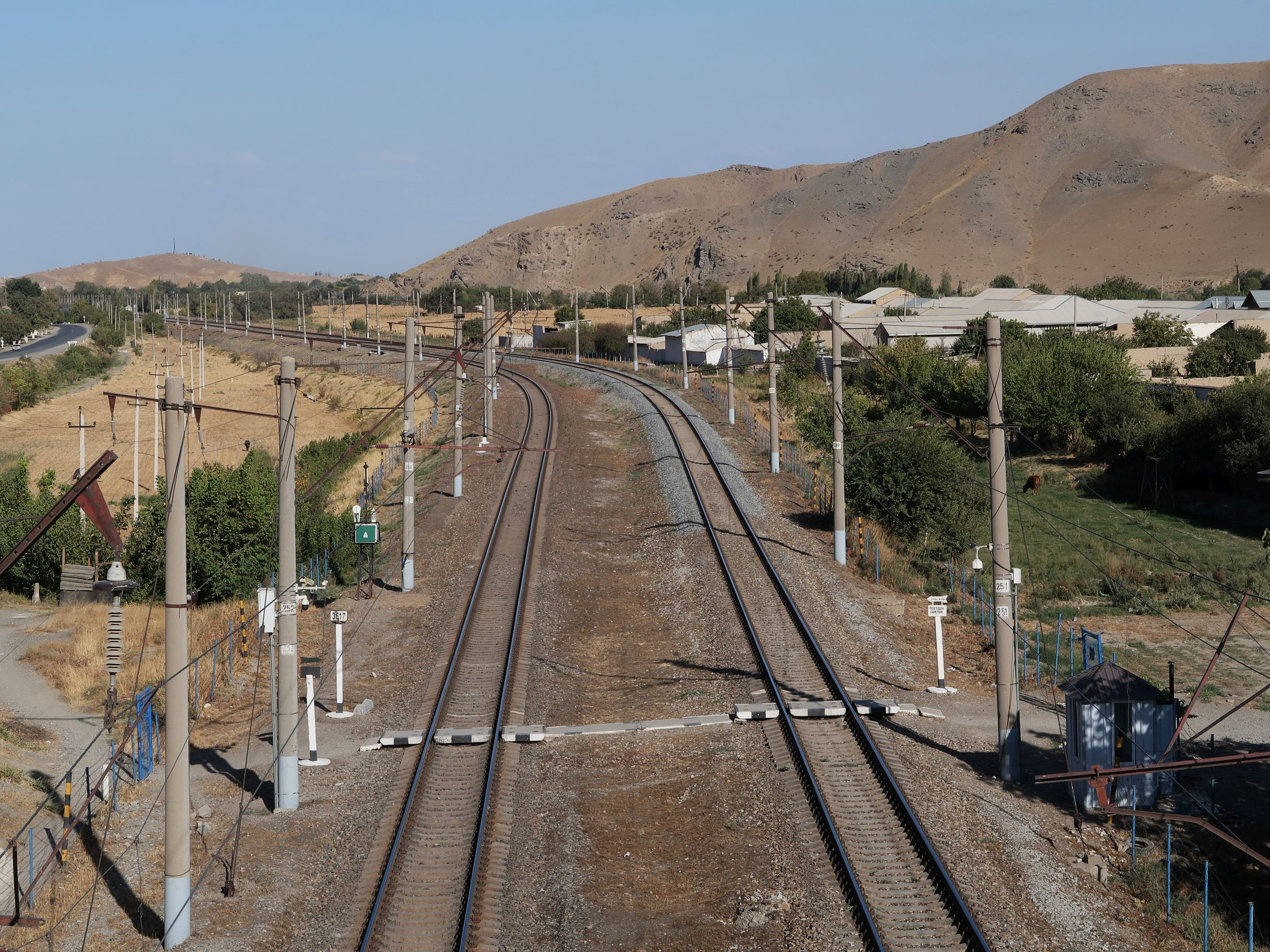
Trans-Caspian railway

Along the valley of the Sangzor River runs the highway "Big Uzbek Route", connecting the two largest cities in Uzbekistan, Tashkent and Samarkand.

An electrified railroad line connecting the cities of Tashkent and Samarkand passes through the city of Jizzakh, passing through the city of Xovos. Previously, there was also a non-electrified railroad line passing through Syr Darya station, which ceased to function in the 1990s.

Until 2010, a trolleybus transportation network operated in the city. Trolleybuses were replaced by buses produced by the SamKochAvto on Isuzu chassis, as well as shuttle buses based on Daewoo Damas microcars.

== Notable people ==
- Patokh Chodiev
- Hamid Olimjon
- Sharof Rashidov
- Sardor Rashidov
