= Olexander Yarovyi =

Olexander Yarovyi from the Delft University of Technology, Delft, The Netherlands was named Fellow of the Institute of Electrical and Electronics Engineers (IEEE) in 2015 for leadership in ultra-wideband imaging for ground penetrating radar and microwave scanners.
