= Yarovoy (inhabited locality) =

Yarovoy (Russian: Яровой; masculine), Yarovaya (Яровая; feminine), or Yarovoye (Яровое; neuter) is the name of several inhabited localities in Russia.

== Urban localities ==
- Yarovoye, Altai Krai, a town in Altai Krai; 52°56′N 78°35′E

== Rural localities ==
- Yarovoy, Orenburg Oblast, a settlement in Priuralsky Selsoviet of Orenburgsky District in Orenburg Oblast
- Yarovoy, Samara Oblast, a settlement in Krasnoyarsky District of Samara Oblast
- Yarovoye, Kaliningrad Oblast, a settlement under the administrative jurisdiction of the town of district significance of Gusev in Gusevsky District of Kaliningrad Oblast
- Yarovoye, Kurgan Oblast, a selo in Yarovinsky Selsoviet of Polovinsky District in Kurgan Oblast; 54°53′N 66°13′E
- Yarovoye, Leningrad Oblast, a settlement in Sevastyanovskoye Settlement Municipal Formation of Priozersky District in Leningrad Oblast; 61°2′N 29°49′E
- Yarovoye, Tyumen Oblast, a selo in Armizonsky Rural Okrug of Armizonsky District in Tyumen Oblast
