= Lyubov Yarovaya =

1953 film by Yan Frid

Lyubov Yarovaya Любовь Яровая
- Directed by: Yan Frid
- Written by: Konstantin Trenyov (play)
- Cinematography: Apollinari Dudko; Aleksandr Sysoyev
- Music by: Venedikt Pushkov
- Production company: Lenfilm Studio
- Release date: 13 March 1953
- Running time: 155 minutes
- Country: Soviet Union
- Language: Russian

Lyubov Yarovaya (Russian: Любовь Яровая) is a 1953 Soviet drama film directed by Yan Frid as film adaptation of the original stage production at Leningrad Bolshoi Drama Theater premiered in 1951. Both the stage production and its film adaptation were based on a 1926 play of the same name by Konstantin Trenyov, which was later adapted a second time as a 1970 film made at Lenfilm studios and starring a new generation of actors. The 1953 film was the most popular film released in the Soviet Union that year, with attendance of more than 46 million.

== Plot ==
Set during the Russian Civil War in Crimea, the film follows the tensions and betrayals within a small town under Red control. The local authority is led by Commissar Roman Koshkin (Vitaly Polizeymako), a tough but naive leader surrounded by secret adversaries, including his assistant Elisatov (Efim Kopelyan), a corrupt opportunist masquerading as a journalist, and his secretary-typist, Pavla Panova. The city also hosts Commissar Vikhor, a "radical" known for his disdain for intellectuals and military specialists. Vikhor causes unrest by defiling a professor's library and scrawling threats against the bourgeoisie in blood. Despite resolving the professor's complaints, Koshkin takes no action against Vikhor. Meanwhile, a schoolteacher, Lyubov Yarovaya (Zinaida Karpova), tries to warn Koshkin about the advancing White Army, but Panova blocks her, citing the commissar's preoccupation.

When reports confirm the White Army's approach, Koshkin orders a detachment, led by Vikhor, to destroy a key bridge. The mission fails, and the Reds retreat, leaving Koshkin and a small group to organize an underground resistance. Soon after, the White Army, led by Colonel Malinin, occupies the town, prompting celebrations. At a church service, Lyubov recognizes Vikhor—now disguised as Lieutenant Mikhail Yarovoy (Alexander Mazaev)—as her long-lost husband, presumed dead since World War I. Their emotional reunion is interrupted when a resident accuses Yarovoy of being a former Red commissar, though Colonel Malinin defuses the situation by affirming Yarovoy's allegiance to the Whites. However, Lyubov becomes estranged from her husband after learning of his betrayal. Meanwhile, Koshkin and the underground plan to rescue captured comrades slated for execution, but they need information about the location and timing. Both Koshkin and Lyubov fail to extract details from Panova, who is entangled in her own web of manipulation involving rival officers.

As tensions rise, Lyubov attempts to retrieve crucial documents but is caught in the act by a snitch. Her husband intervenes, saving her by concocting a story about jealousy. Despite his efforts to reconcile, Lyubov is resolute in her mission to save the prisoners. With Panova's tip, Lyubov identifies an officer who might hold the orders but is misled, resulting in his death without finding the needed information. Koshkin arranges a meeting for the underground, but Yarovoy, leading a White detachment, intercepts them, arresting everyone, including his wife. While the Reds breach the frontlines and the Whites hastily retreat, Yarovoy delays to execute the prisoners. Overwhelmed by his wife's plea to spare them, Yarovoy falters, allowing the prisoners to be freed. As the Red Army enters the city, Yarovoy attempts to escape but is betrayed by Lyubov, who identifies him to the Red authorities.

== Cast ==
- Zinaida Karpova as Lyubov Yarovaya
- Igor Gorbachyov as Shvandya
- Elena Granovskaya as Elena Ivanovna Gornostaeva
- Valentina Kibardina as Panova
- Aleksandr Mazayev as Yarovoy
- Yefim Kopelyan as Officer
- Lyudmila Makarova as Maiden
- Vladislav Strzhelchik as Dancer

== Bibliography ==
- Goble, Alan. The Complete Index to Literary Sources in Film. Walter de Gruyter, 1999.
- Rollberg, Peter. Historical Dictionary of Russian and Soviet Cinema. Scarecrow Press, 2008.
