= Aaly Tokombaev =

Kyrgyz writer and composer (1904–1988)

Aaly Tokombaev Аалы Токомбаев
- Born: November 7, 1904; Kayyngdy, Semirechye Oblast, Russian Empire
- Died: June 19, 1988 (aged 83); Bishkek, Kyrgyz SSR, USSR
- Citizenship: Russian Empire, Soviet Union
- Education: National University of Uzbekistan
- Occupations: Writer, poet
- Children: 4
- Writing career
- Pen name: Balka
- Language: Kyrgyz
- Period: 1923–1927
- Notable awards: Hero of Socialist Labour; Order of Lenin; Order of the Red Banner of Labour; Order of the Badge of Honour

Aaly Tokombaev (Kyrgyz: Аалы Токомбаев; November 7, 1904 – June 19, 1988) was a poet, composer, and a famous novelist who greatly influenced the Kyrgyz nation. In 1927 he graduated from the Middle Asian Community University (presently National University of Uzbekistan, in Tashkent. After graduation, he fully devoted himself to Soviet Kyrgyz literature.

In the following years of 1927 through 1940 he began to write a collection of poems. Tokombaev published the collections Lenin (1927), Flowers of Labor (1932), and Early Poems (1934) and the novellas The Dnieper Empties into the Deep Sea (1939) and The Wounded Heart (1940). Throughout the Great Patriotic War (1941–1945) he wrote patriotic and narrative poems through which he expressed his opinions, ideas, and beliefs.

In his time Kyrgyzstan was the scene of a struggle between tsarism and Soviet rule. He wrote such novels as Before the Dawn, Part 1; Bloody Years (1935); Before the Dawn, Part 2 (1947). Through those books he expressed opinions on the unfair rule and treatment of the Kyrgyz people.

He died in 1988.

== Major works ==
(Russian/Kyrgyz titles in parentheses)

- About Lenin ("Ленин тууралу", 1927)
- Mirror of a woman ("Зеркало женщины", 1929)
- Flowers of work ("Эмгек гүлү", 1932)
- Attack ("Атака", 1932)
- Early verses ("Абалкы ырлар", 1934)
- Dnestr flow into deep sea ("Днестр терең деңизге куят", 1939)
- Wounded heart ("Жараланган жүрөк", 1940)
- With my own eyes ("Өз көзүм менен", 1952)
- My birth certificate ("Менин метрикам", 1955)
- Face to Face ("Лицом к лицу", 1957)
- Time flies ("Время летит", 1958)
- Investigation is going on ("Тергөө жүрүп жатат", 1962)
- Melodies of komuz ("Мелодии комуза", 1962)
- We were soldiers ("Мы были солдатами", 1974)
- Master ("Мастер", 1982)
- Toktogul ("Токтогул", 2014)

== Honours and awards ==
- Hero of Socialist Labour (27 September 1974)
- Order of Lenin (28 February 1946, 27 September 1974)
- Order of the October Revolution (6 November 1984)
- Three Order of the Red Banner of Labour (14 April 1955, 1 November 1958, 11 January 1964)
- Order of the Badge of Honour (31 January 1951)
- State Prize of the Kirghiz SSR named after Toktogul Satylganov (1967).

== Legacy ==
=== Eponyms ===
- Prospect after Aaly Tokombaev, a street in southern part of Bishkek, named in 1990.

=== Memorials ===
- Aaly Tokmbaev's memorial near Bishkek Opera and Ballet Theater.

=== Museums ===
- Museum after A.Tokmbaev in Bishkek
