= Hamid Olimjon =

Hamid Olimjon Хамид Алимджан
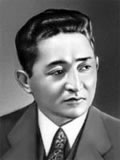
- Born: Hamid Olimjonov; 12 December 1909; Jizzakh, Russian Turkestan
- Died: 3 July 1944 (aged 34); Tashkent, Uzbek SSR, Soviet Union
- Occupations: poet, playwright, scholar, and literary translator
- Writing career
- Notable awards: Lenin Komsomol Prize (1973); Order of Outstanding Merit (2004)

Hamid Olimjon (sometimes spelled Hamid Alimjan in English; Uzbek: Ҳамид Олимжон; Hamid Olimjon; Russian: Хамид Алимджан; Khamid Alimdzhan; 12 December 1909 – 3 July 1944) was an Uzbek poet, playwright, scholar, and literary translator of the Soviet period. Hamid Olimjon is regarded as one of the finest 20th‑century Uzbek poets. The Uzbek Soviet Encyclopedia describes him as "one of the founders of Uzbek Soviet literature". In addition to writing his own poetry, Hamid Olimjon translated the works of many celebrated foreign authors – including Alexander Pushkin, Leo Tolstoy, Maxim Gorky, Vladimir Mayakovsky, Taras Shevchenko, and Mikhail Lermontov – into the Uzbek language.

Hamid Olimjon was married to the renowned Uzbek poet Zulfiya. He died in a car accident in Tashkent on 3 July 1944, at the age of 34.

== Life ==
Hamid Olimjon was born on 12 December 1909 in Jizzakh. His father died when Hamid Olimjon was only four years old. From 1918 to 1923, he studied at Narimonov Elementary School in Jizzakh.

From 1923 to 1928, he studied at Samarkand Pedagogical University, and from 1928 to 1931 at the Uzbek Pedagogical Academy. He became a member of the Communist Party of the Soviet Union in 1942.

In 1935, he married the renowned Uzbek poet Zulfiya. He died in a car accident in Tashkent on 3 July 1944.

== Work ==
Hamid Olimjon began writing poetry during his student years. In 1926, he published his works in the Zarafshon newspaper. In 1927, he became an editor of that newspaper.

Hamid Olimjon's first collection of poems, Koʻklam (The Spring), was published in 1929. He also published many other collections of poetry, including Tong shabadasi (Morning Breeze) (1930), Olov sochlar (Fiery Hair) (1931), Oʻlim yovga (Death to the Enemy) (1932), Poyga (The Race) (1932), Daryo kechasi (The River's Night) (1936), Chirchiq sohillarida (On the Banks of Chirchiq) (1937), Sheʼrlar (Poems) (1937), Oʻlka (Country) (1939), Baxt (Happiness) (1940), Qoʻlingga qurol ol! (Take up a Weapon!) (1942), Ona va oʻgʻil (Mother and Son) (1942), and Ishonch (Trust) (1943). In 1928, he wrote two collections of short stories, namely Tong shabadasi (Morning Breeze) and Haqiqat izlab (Seeking Truth).

Hamid Olimjon also wrote many epic poems such as Ikki qizning hikoyasi (The Story of Two Girls) (1937), Oygul bilan Baxtiyor (Oygul and Baxtiyor) (1937), Zaynab va Omon (Zaynab and Omon) (1938), and Semurgʻ yoki Parizod va Bunyod (Semurg or Parizod and Bunyod) (1939). He also collected and published the Uzbek epic poem Alpomish for the first time in 1938.

Hamid Olimjon also authored plays that remain popular to this day in Uzbek theatres. Among his most famous plays are Muqanna and Jinoyat (The Crime).

In addition to writing his own poetry, Hamid Olimjon translated the works of many celebrated foreign authors, such as Alexander Pushkin, Alexander Serafimovich, Konstantin Simonov, Leo Tolstoy, Lord Byron, Maxim Gorky, Mikhail Lermontov, Mikhail Svetlov, Nikolai Ostrovsky, Oleksandr Korniychuk, Pavlo Tychyna, Taras Shevchenko, Vera Inber, and Vladimir Mayakovsky into the Uzbek language. Hamid Olimjon's works have in turn been translated into many other languages.

Hamid Olimjon extensively studied Uzbek classical literature. In 1943, he became a corresponding member of the Academy of Sciences of the Uzbek SSR. As a member of the committee established to celebrate the 500th anniversary of Ali-Shir Nava'i's birth, Hamid Olimjon studied Nava'i's life and work and published numerous scholarly articles on the subject. He also played an important role in translating Nava'i's works into Russian. Hamid Olimjon became executive secretary of the Writers' Union of the Uzbek SSR in 1939 and held this position until his death in 1944.

== Translations of literary works ==
Hamid Olimjon translated many works into the Uzbek language. He translated Pushkin's "Kavkaz asiri" and "Suv parisi", Mikhail Lermontov's story "Bela" from his narrative "Zamonamiz qahramoni", Gorky's "Chelkash" stories, N. Ostrovsky's novel "Poʻlat qanday toblandi", A. Korneychuk's play "Platon Krechet", and also some poems by poets such as Byron, Pushkin, Shevchenko, P. Tichina, M. Bezimenskiy, M. Svetlov, K. Simonov, and V. Inber.

== Family ==
Zulfiya Isroilova (1915–1996) was a poet, journalist, translator, and public figure. She was named the People's Poet of Uzbekistan in 1965 and received the title of Hero of Socialist Labour in 1984.

Daughter: Hulkar

Brother: Sarvar Azimov (1923–1994) was a Soviet and Uzbek writer, a state figure, and a diplomat.

== Heritage and legacy ==
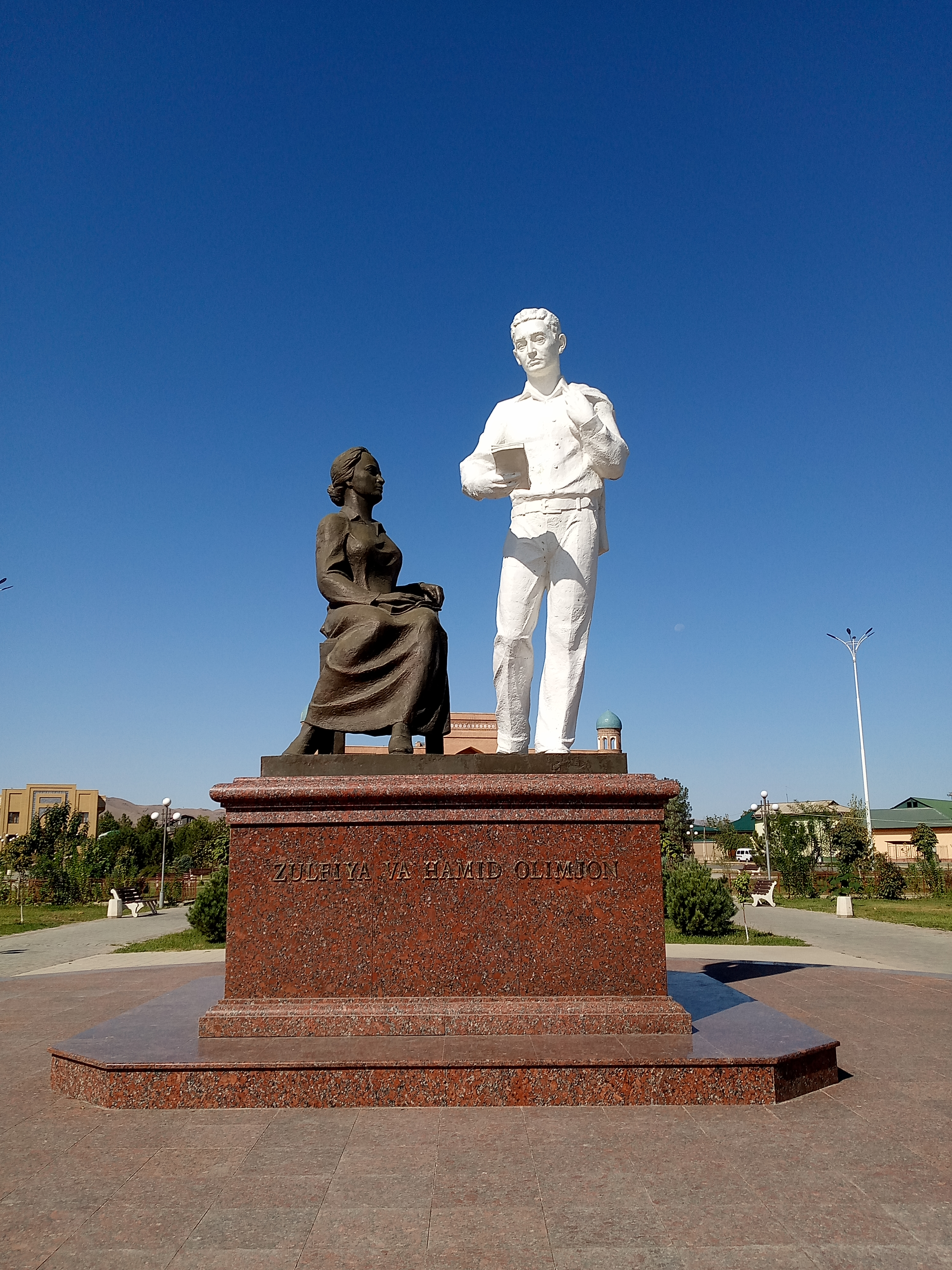
Statue of the renowned Uzbek poets Zulfiya (left) and Hamid Olimjon (right)

Hamid Olimjon died at the age of 35 as a result of a car accident. One of the Tashkent Metro stations, the Literary House of the Writers' Union, and the Regional Theatre in Samarkand were named after Hamid Olimjon. In the city of Tashkent, a square was dedicated to him in the poet's name (in 1990), and a neighbourhood in the vicinity of this area was also named in his honour. He was posthumously awarded the Order of Outstanding Merit on 23 August 2004.

== Published works ==
Collection of complete works (5 volumes). Tashkent, "Fan", 1975–1984.

== Bibliography ==
- Allworth, Edward (1964), Uzbek Literary Politics, The Hague: Mouton & Co.
- Azimov, A. (1955), Hamid Olimjon, Tashkent.
- Azimov, A. (1966), Hamid Olimjon adabiyoti, Tashkent.
