= Alpamysh =

Ancient Turkic epic

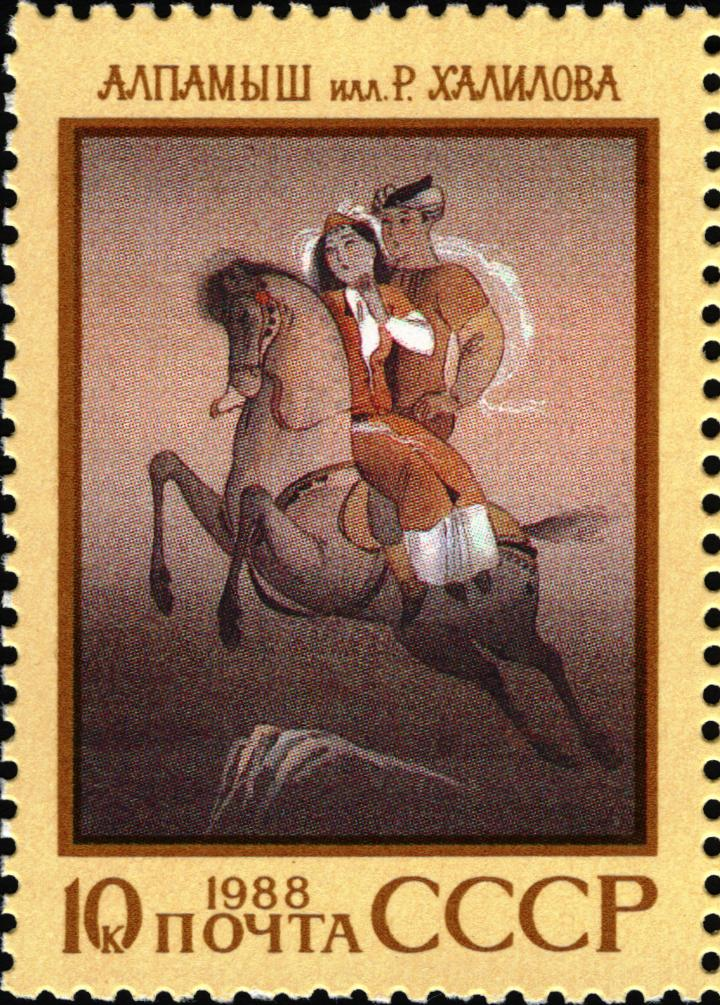

Alpamysh, also spelled as Alpamish or Alpamis (Uzbek: Alpomish, Kazakh: Alpamıs, Turkish: Alpamış, Bashkir: Алпамыша, Russian: Алпамыш, Azerbaijani: Alpamış, Kazan Tatar: Аlpamşa, Altay: Аlıp Мanaş), is an ancient Turkic epic or dastan, an ornate oral history, generally set in verse, and one of the most important examples of the Turkic oral literature of Central Asia, mainly the Kipchak Turks.

== History ==
Among the Uzbeks the epic is known as "Alpomish", Kazakhs and Karakalpaks as "Alpamis", Altay mountaineers as "Alip-Manash", Bashkirs as "Alpamisha and Barsin khiluu", and Kazan Tatars as the tale of "Alpamşa". It is also known among other Turkic people, as well as Tajiks. According to scholars Borovkov, Hadi Zarif and Zhirmunskiy, as well as earlier writings by academician Bartold, all specialists in Oriental and Turkic studies, the dastan Alpamysh "existed probably in the foothills of the Altai as early as the sixth-eighth centuries at the time of the Turkic Khaganate." The tale of Alpamish was supplanted in ninth-tenth centuries from Altay mountains to Syr-darya river by the Oghuz Turks, where the story line continued on independently and became part of the Salor-Kazan tale, one of the main characters in the Book of Dede Korkut. The epic acquired its final form between the fourteenth and seventeenth centuries. Alpamish is one of the best known Turkic epics from among a total of well over 1,000 recorded epics among the Mongolian and Turkic language families by international scholars.

According to Turkish historian Hasan Paksoy, the dastan Alpamysh, like other dastans (e.g., Book of Dede Korkut) were suppressed and otherwise discouraged from studying in the Soviet Union, culminating in the 1950s in what has come to be known as the "Trial of Alpamysh". Despite all the repressions, Alpamysh was printed no less than 55 times between 1899 and 1984. For example, it was published in the Soviet Union in 1939, 1941, and 1949, 1957, 1958 and 1961. The entry in the Great Soviet Encyclopedia, second edition (1952), praises the epic as "a national saga of valour, courage and detestation of the enemies", "one of the best examples of Uzbek heroic epos", "rich in aphorisms, expressive metaphors and proof of the wealth of the Uzbek popular poetic language".

In 1999, at the request of Uzbekistan delegation to the UNESCO, the "Thousandth anniversary of the popular epic Alpamysh" was held.

== Versions ==
The Alpamys dastan, in its Uzbek variant of ashiq Fazil Yuldashogli, which is the largest recorded version with 14 thousand verses, consists of two parts (other scholars have divided the epic into four parts). There are regional variations of this story. The first part deals with the hero's wooing, the second (much longer) with the vicissitudes which he undergoes as a result of attempting to assist his father-in-law and his return home after seven years just as his wife is about to be forced to marry a usurper.

== Brief synopsis of the story ==
=== Part 1 ===
The first part tells about Alpamys and his bride Barchin (sometimes known as Gulibairsen in the Siberian and Mongolian variants), with whom he has been engaged since childhood. Their fathers, Bayburi and Baysari, were from the Konirat tribe and were childless for a very long time, until their pleas were heard by God, and Baysari had one daughter, whilst Bayburi had a daughter and a son. After an argument, Baysari and his family moved to the Kalmyk country. There Barchin, by then a very pretty young lady, attracted the attention of the pehlivans (strongmen) of Kalmyk shah, Taycha-khan. In order to avoid an involuntary marriage to any of the hated by her pehlivan, Barchin declares that she will marry anyone, who wins all four contests: horse race ("bayga"), archery skills, target shooting from a bow, and wrestling.

Barchin is secretly hoping that the winner will be her beloved Alpamys, after whom she sends several people (ambassadors). One of the Kalmyk pehlivans, Karajan, turns from an opponent and enemy to a friend of the hero. Karajan outruns all the competitors on Alpamysh's horse, Baychibare, despite all the tricks by Kalmyks, who initially tie him in ropes and maim his horse by inserting nails into the horse's hooves. Karajan enters the wrestling competition with Kalmyk pehlivans, after which Alpamysh emerges victorious by beating the strongest of pehlivans, Kokaldash.

Together with Barchin, who is now his wife, they return to Konirat. The only person to stay in Kalmyk country is Baysari, who is still angry at Bayburi.

=== Part 2 ===
In the second part, Alpamysh, finding out about the hardships caused to Baysari by the Taycha-khan, once again travels to the Kalmyk country, and falls captive to his tricky enemies.

He then spends seven years in the dungeon of the Kalmyk khan. He is being fed by a choban (shepherd) Kaykubat, who accidentally discovered his location. The daughter of the Kalmyk khan visits Alpamysh in his cell, falls in love with him and helps to free him from captivity. The freed Alpamysh then confronts Taycha-khan, kills him, and puts shepherd Kaykubat on the throne.

During his seven-year absence, the leader of the Kongrat tribe becomes his youngest brother Ultantaz. The new ruler is persecuting his people, dishonors the old father of Alpamysh, and harasses the young son Yadgar, whilst forcing Barchin to marry him. Alpamysh, by switching clothes with his old shepherd servant Kultay, undetected, comes to the marriage celebration of Ultantaz, frees his wife Barchin and kills Ultantaz. The epic ends with Barchin's father, Baysari, returning from voluntary exile and re-unification of the previously divided Kongrat tribe under the leadership of heroic Alpamysh.

The Siberian Turkic nations' version of the epic can be summarized as follows:

"Alpamis, recounts the story of its hero’s life and the events before his birth with rich description and intriguing stories. Its basic plot, however, can be classified into four parts. First, Alpamis’ parents pray for a son, make a pilgrimage, and experience the miraculous pregnancy of Alpamis’ mother. Alpamis is eventually born and grows up. Second, Alpamis marries the beauty Gulibairsen after a heroic battle. Third, after returning home with his wife, Alpamis fights his enemy Taishik Khan, who has ransacked his herds and property; Alpamis kills him and recovers everything that was lost. Fourth, after returning home again, Alpamis conquers Urtan—a very destructive demon and son of the charwoman of Alpamis’ family—who attempted to possess his wife Gulibairsen."

=== Sequel ===
There is also a lesser-known sequel to Alpamish, about the heroic adventures of Yadgar (Yadigar), the son of Alpamish and Barchin (Gulibairsen).

=== Adaptations ===
Yerkegali Rakhmadiyev’s national opera Alpamys, dedicated to the 30th anniversary of Kazakhstan’s independence, was named premiere of the year at the Astana Opera in 2021.

== See also ==
- Book of Dede Korkut
- Epic of Köroğlu
