= Konstantin Trenyov =

Soviet Russian writer and playwright

- Константин Андреевич Тренёв
- Born: 2 June 1876; Baksheevka, Kharkov Governorate, Russian Empire
- Died: 19 May 1945 (aged 68); Moscow, USSR
- Writing career
- Genres: Drama, short stories
- Notable work: Lyubov Yarovaya
- Notable awards: Stalin Prize; 1941

Konstantin Andreyevich Trenyov (Russian: Константи́н Андре́евич Тренёв, 2 June [O.S. 19 May] 1876 – May 19, 1945) was a Soviet Russian writer and playwright, USSR State Prize laureate (1941), best known for his Russian Civil War history drama Lyubov Yarovaya (1926).

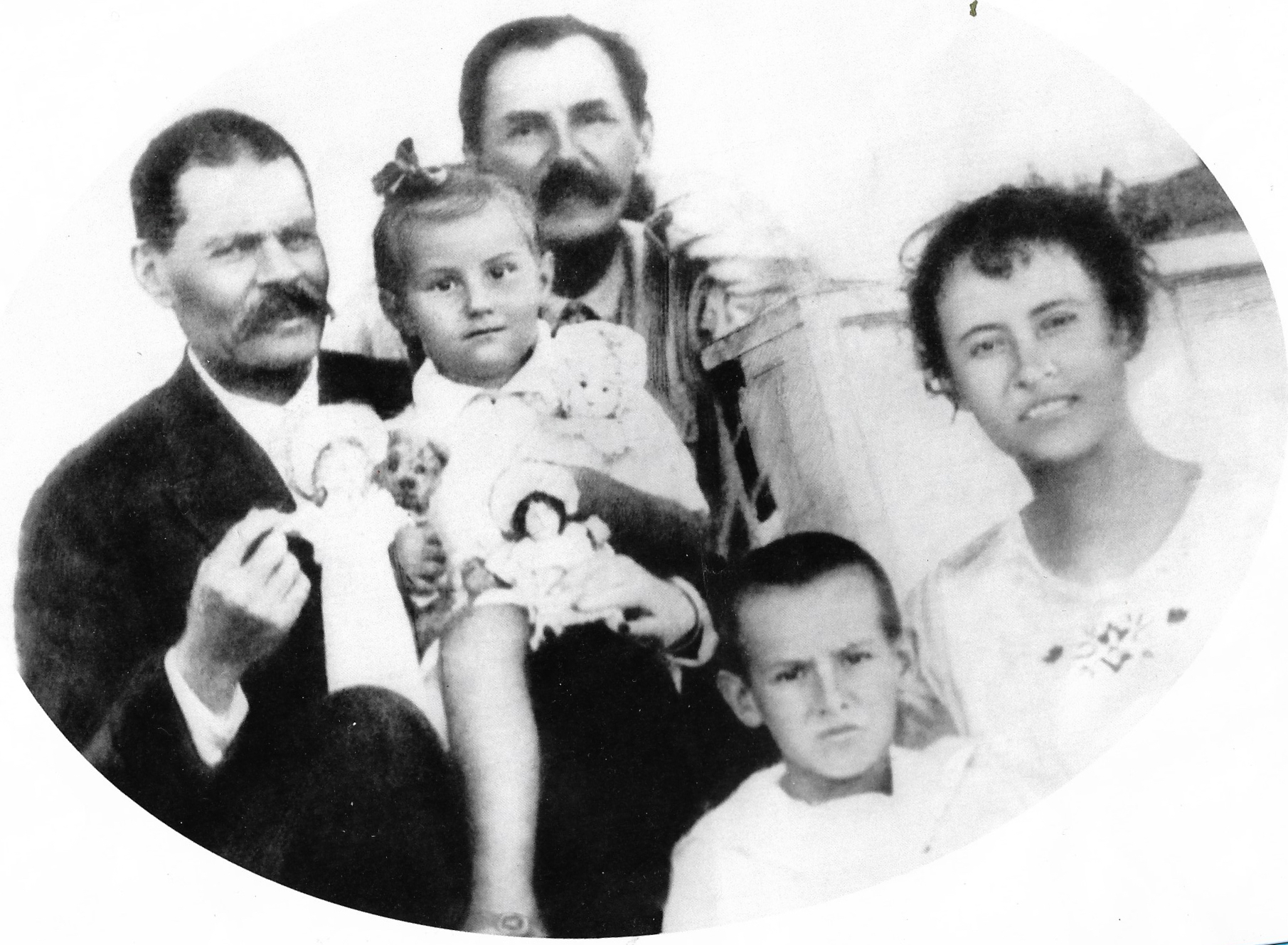
The Trenev family and Maxim Gorky

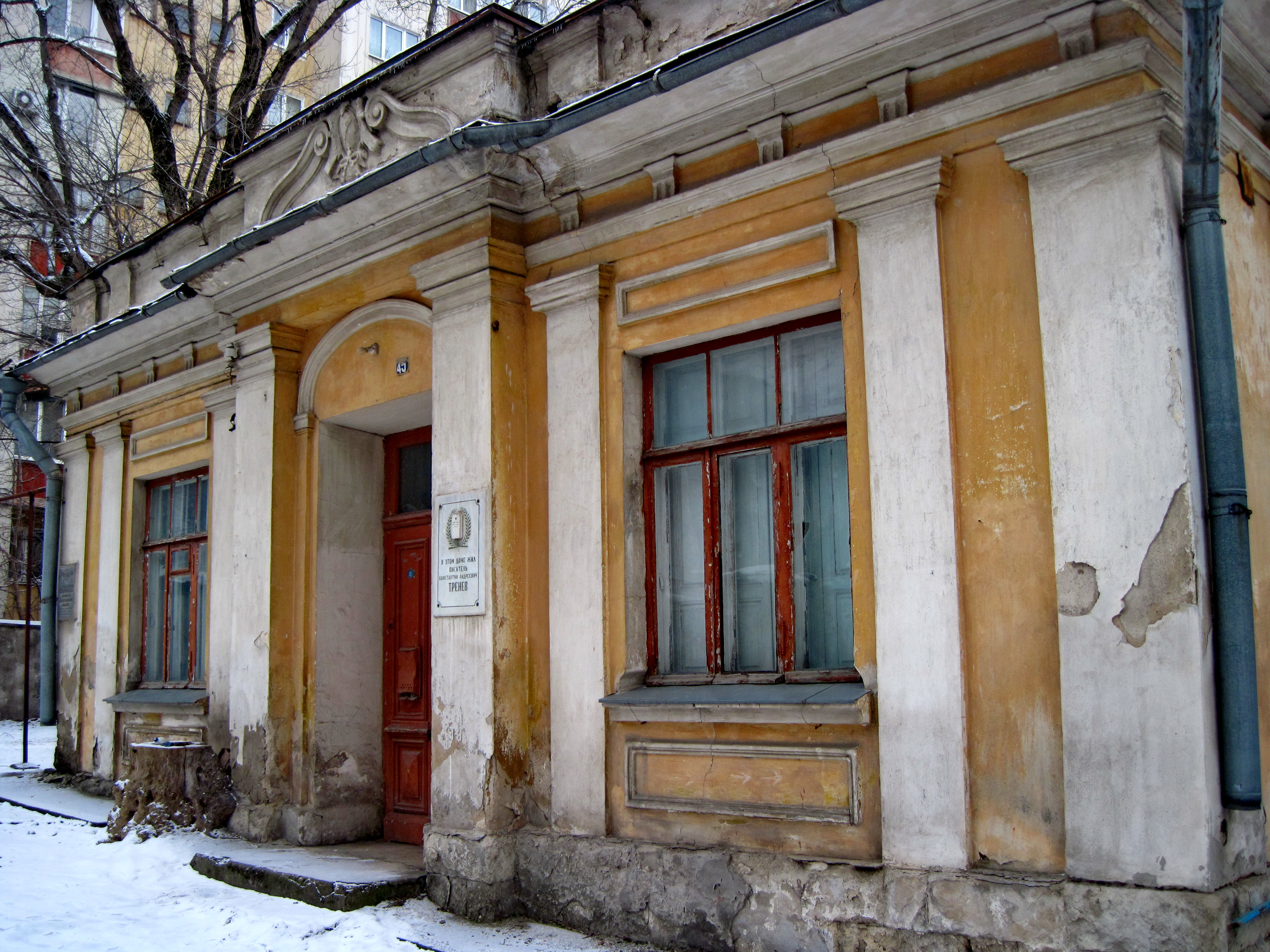
The house where Trenev lived in Simferopol in 1926-1931

== Selected bibliography ==
- Doroginy (Дорогины, 1910, play)
- Vladyka (Владыка, 1915, short stories)
- Pugachovschina (Пугачёвщина, 1924, play)
- Lyubov Yarovaya (Любовь Яровая, 1926, play)
- Gymnasists (Гимназисты, 1936, play)
- On Neva Banks (На берегу Невы, 1937, play)
