= Punjabi Muslims =

Ethnic Punjabis who are adherents of Islam

Punjabi Muslims پن٘جابی مُسلمان
Regions with significant populations
- Pakistan: 112,807,000
- India: 535,489
- United Kingdom: 500,000
- United States: 263,699

Religions
- Islam (Sunni majority, Shia & Ahmadiyya minority)

Languages
- Punjabi (Shahmukhi script), Urdu

Related ethnic groups
- Punjabis and other Pakistani Muslims

Punjabi Muslims (Punjabi: پن٘جابی مُسلمان) are Punjabis who are adherents of Islam. With a population of more than 112 million, they are the third-largest predominantly Islam-adhering Muslim ethnicity in the world, after Arabs and Bengalis.

The majority of Punjabi Muslims are adherents of Sunni Islam, while a minority adheres to Shi'a Islam. A majority is primarily native to the Pakistani province of Punjab, although a large proportion derives ancestry from the wider Punjab region. Punjabi Muslims speak or identify with the Punjabi language (using Shahmukhi script) as their mother tongue.

== Identity ==
The coalescence of the various tribes, castes and the inhabitants of the Punjab region into a broader common "Punjabi" identity initiated from the onset of the 16th century CE. However, Punjab as a linguistic, geographical and cultural entity had existed for centuries prior. Integration and assimilation are important parts of Punjabi culture, since Punjabi identity is not based solely on tribal connections. Islam spread in the region via missionary Sufi saints whose dargahs dot the landscape of the Punjab region, thereby becoming the faith of many by the 16th century. This contributed to the formation of a Punjabi Muslim identity.

== History ==
=== Early period ===
At the advent of Islam in the 7th century, Punjab was part of Takka kingdom. By then, Buddhism had declined in Punjab after the fall of the Kushans, and had largely disappeared by the turn of the 10th century. Several scholars have identified Takka kingdom with the kingdom of al-Usaifan, whose king is reported by al-Baladhuri to have converted to Islam during the reign of Caliph al-Mu'tasim (r. 833–842). However, Islam as a political power got introduced via southern Punjab only after the 8th century Umayyad conquest of Sindh. The first Muslim state based in Punjab was the Emirate of Multan, established in 855 after the disintegration of the Abbasid Caliphate. In the 11th century, Muslim conquered northern Punjab when Ghaznavids defeated the Odi Shahi dynasty. The city of Lahore became a cosmopolitan city, rivalling Ghazni and acting as a second capital of the empire.

In Punjab, conversion to Islam occurred mostly amongst pastoralist or agricultural groups that were not integrated into the Hindu varna social class hierarchy, such as Jats, known in Arabic as Zuṭṭ. Jat communities got established in Iraq and Syria, and they played role in the regional trade, agriculture and warfare. Sufi mystics played a major role in the propagation of Islam among the tribes of the Bar region, albeit in a syncretic form. The Gakhars of Pothohar were noted for their martial capabilities and gradually converted to Islam.

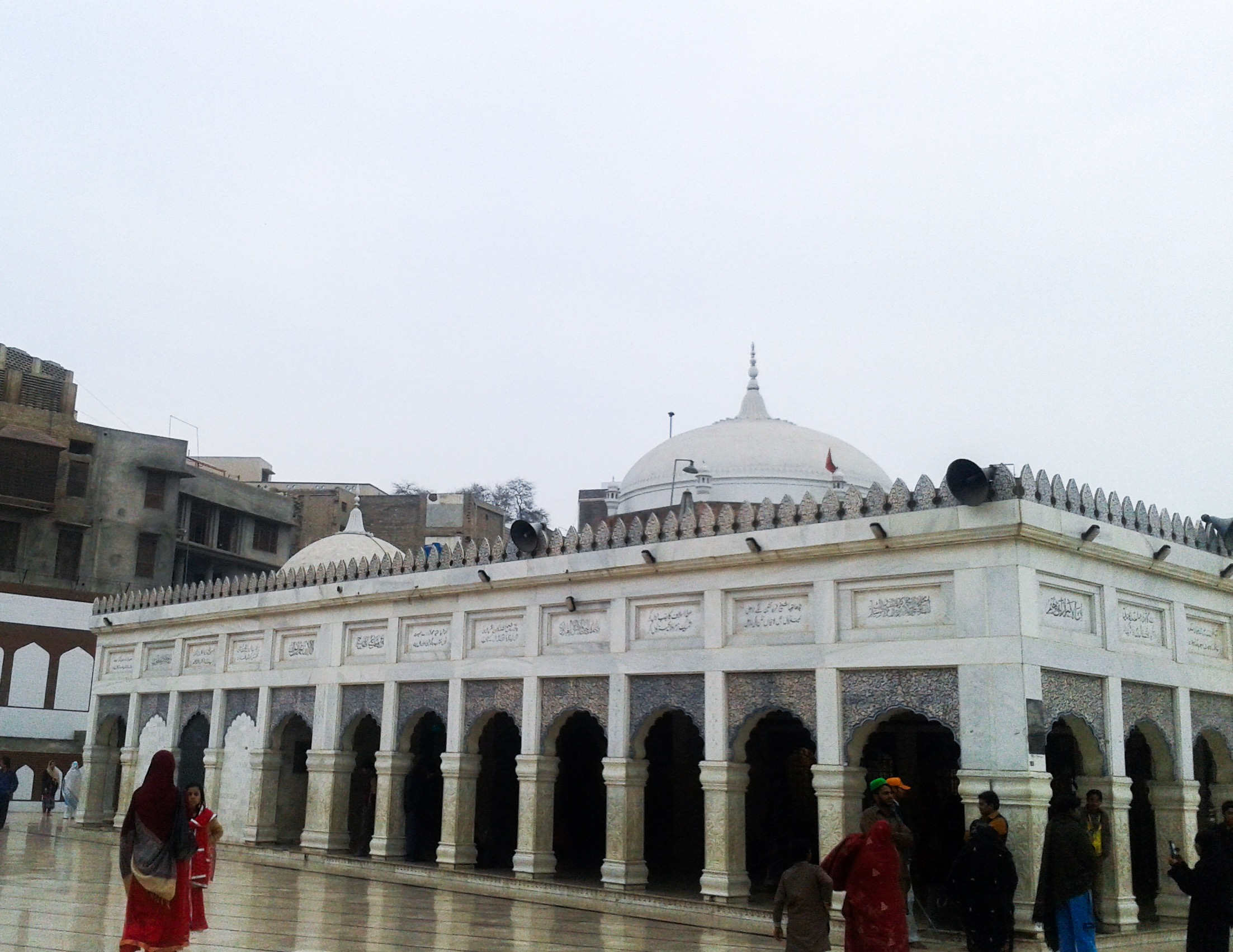
The Shrine of Baba Farid, one of the early Punjabi Sufi saints

=== Medieval period ===
In 1161, the Ghurids conquered the city of Ghazni, forcing the Ghaznavids to shift their capital to Lahore. Soon, however, Muhammad Ghori invaded Punjab as well, and conquered Lahore and Multan in 1186, marking end of the Ghaznavids. In 1206, he was assassinated at Damiak by Isma'ilis or Khokhars. One of his Mamluk slaves, Qutb ud-Din Aibak, established the Delhi Sultanate, with Lahore being the first capital of the sultanate. The early period of the Delhi Sultanate saw several Mongol invasions of Punjab. Ultimately, Mongols were defeated during the rule of the Khalji dynasty.

Islam became firmly established in Punjab during the era of Delhi Sultanate, with local playing an important role in the inter-dynastic struggle. In 1320, Ghazi Malik, the former governor of Multan, rebelled against the Khalji rule. With the support of various factions including Khokhars, he established the Tughlaq dynasty. Some of the earliest mentions of Punjabi language date to this period.

The Multan-born Tughlaq governor, Ayn al-Mulk Mahru made early geopolitical references to the realm of Punjab. By the late 14th century, however, the Tughlaq dynasty had declined, and the sultanate was divided among various warlords. The city of Lahore was intermittently captured by Khokhars. Taking advantage of the prevailing anarchy, Timur led a brutal invasion of Delhi sultanate in 1398. Lahore had been under control of Shaikha Khokhar since 1394, who resisted Timur but was defeated and killed. Afterwards, Timur plundered Delhi and massacred its inhabitants. Tughlaq power crumbled and resulted in nobles asserting formal independence. In 1414 the Tughlaq dynasty was itself replaced by Sayyid dynasty of Khizr Khan, a Punjabi chieftain. Much of the time of Sayyid sultans was spent fighting against Jasrat, who was the most formidable opponent of Delhi sultans in Punjab. Southern Punjab became independent from Delhi when Langah Sultanate broke away in 1445. The rulers of medieval Gujarat Sultanate in western India also had Punjabi Khatri origins.

=== Early modern period ===
==== Mughal Empire ====
By the early 16th century, the Lodi dynasty which succeeded Sayyids had control over little more than the region around Lahore in Punjab. In 1525, the Mughal emperor Babur invaded Delhi Sultanate and conquered it by defeating Ibrahim Lodi in the first battle of Panipat. The Gakhars of Potohar remained loyal to the house of Babur after Sher Shah Suri overthrew the Mughals under Humayun. This caused Sher Shah Suri to invade Pothohar and the local chief Sarang Khan died fighting against him. However, Gakhars continued their resistance, even after Sher Shah Suri's Khatri minister Todar Mal constructed the Rohtas Fort in the region. Gakhar chiefs such as Kamal Khan were part of Mughal nobility when Humayun regained Delhi after defeating Sur dynasty in the second battle of Panipat.

According to the Ain-i-Akbari written during the reign of Akbar, Punjab region was divided into subahs of Lahore and Multan. One of Akbar's generals, Shahbaz Khan Kamboh hailed from Lahore. Muslims had majority in southern Punjab by the 16th century, and a definitive Punjabi identity had formed as the inhabitants of Punjab started to be addressed as Punjabis by the outsiders during the 17th century. Several Punjabi Muslims rose to high ranks during Mughal period, such as the grand vizier Sa'adullah Khan Chinioti (1645–1656). Sa'adullah Khan oversaw construction of several Mughal monuments including Taj Mahal under the supervision of architect Ustad Ahmad Lahori, who was also from Punjab, and led the Mughal army to Balkh in 1646 during Shah Jahan's war against the Safavids in the region. Wazir Khan of Chiniot was also a governor of Lahore and a great patron of arts and architecture; he built the Wazir Khan Mosque complex in Lahore.

The death of Aurangzeb in 1707, began the decline of Mughal power in the 18th century. Between 1712 and 1719, Barhas, a dynasty of kingmakers of peasant origins from Punjab, exercised de facto control over the Mughal Empire. Mughal authority in Punjab remained in the hands of Nawabs who gave nominal allegiance to the Mughal emperor in Delhi; however it collapsed in Punjab after Mir Mannu died in 1753. The last Nawab of Punjab, Adina Beg Arain attempted to make Punjab independent but after his untimely death in 1758, Ahmad Shah Durrani directly annexed the region. Punjab suffered from the eight invasions of the Durrani Afghans between 1748 and 1767, which ravaged the region.

During these centuries of Mughal rule, Punjabi Muslims established great institutions of Islamic civilization in cities and towns such as Lahore and Sialkot. Punjabi Muslim scholars were "in high demand", teaching the Islamic sciences as far as Central Asia, in cities such as Bukhara, even being considered there as Awliya' within their lifetimes. The Kamboh clan of Lahore also produced many notable scholars and administrators. Other influential Muslim scholars born in Punjab during Mughal era include Abdul Hakim Sialkoti and Ahmad Sirhindi. Between 1761 and 1799, the south Indian kingdom of Mysore was ruled by Hyder Ali, a Punjabi adventurer in the army of Mysore, and his son Tipu Sultan. Tipu Sultan, who is widely hailed as a freedom fighter in South Asia, led Mysore during Anglo-Mysore Wars and also pioneered modern rocketry.

==== Sikh Empire ====
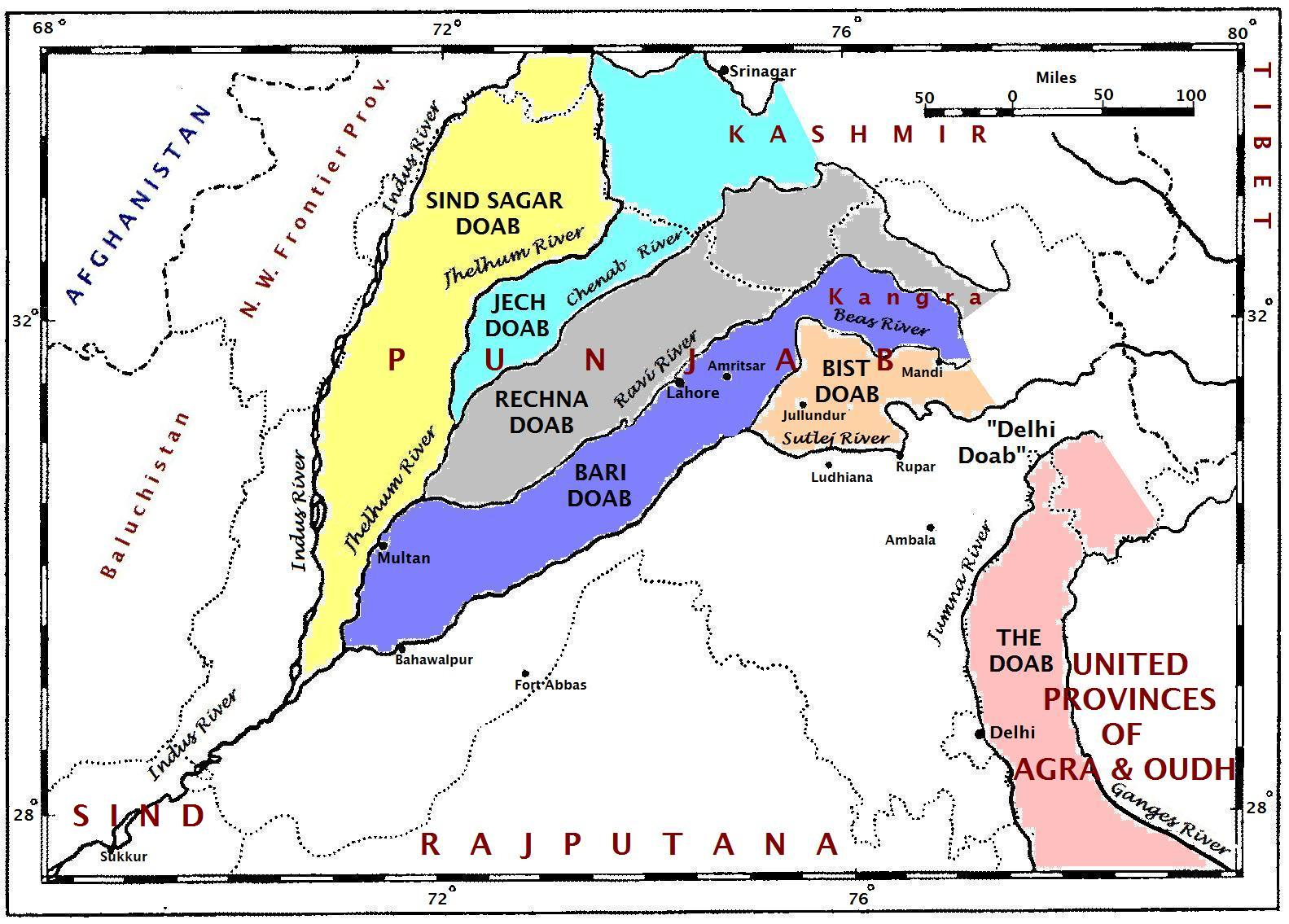
Map of Doabs in Punjab

Ahmad Shah Durrani and his successors failed to maintain control of Punjab except in Attock, Kasur and Multan where large Afghan colonies were based. Punjab was divided into petty Muslim and Sikh chieftaincies. The situation remained as such till Ranjit Singh took Lahore in 1799.

The two important Punjabi Muslim states that existed in 18th century Punjab were those of the Sials and the Gakhars. Gakhars under Sultan Muqarrab Khan (r.1738–1769) established rule over Potohar and the Chaj Doab whilst the Sials with their capital at Jhang conquered the Lower Rachna and Sindh Sagar Doabs under their chief Inayatullah Khan (r.1747–1787). However, Sikhs, who originated in central Punjab, gradually expanded westwards. Owing to their superior European-style military training and discipline, the Sikhs under Ranjit Singh not only gained control of most of Punjab but also conquered Kashmir (1818), Multan (1818) and Peshawar (1833) from Durrani Afghans. Only the Bahawalpur state, then under Daudpotra Jat Nawabs, remained independent from Sikh regime. With Ranjit Singh's death in 1839, Sikh power declined. After suffering defeat in the Anglo-Sikh wars, their territory was annexed in 1849 by the British East India Company.

Views of the Sikh Empire rule, are mixed amongst different Punjabi Muslim groups. Ranjit Singh is seen favourably by a section of Punjabi activists in Pakistan but remains overall largely negative. The mid 19th-century Punjabi Muslim historians, such as Shahamat Ali who experienced the Sikh Empire first hand, presented a different view on Ranjit Singh's empire and governance. According to Ali, Ranjit Singh's government was despotic, and he was a mean monarch in contrast to the Mughals. His account portrays Ranjit Singh as leading his Khalsa army's "insatiable appetite for plunder", their desire for "fresh cities to pillage", and eliminating the Mughal era "revenue intercepting intermediaries between the peasant-cultivator and the treasury". As a symbolic assertion of power, the Sikhs regularly desecrated Muslim places of worship, including closing of the Jamia Masjid in Srinagar and the conversion of the Bad shahi Mosque in Lahore to an ammunition store and horse stable, but the empire still maintained Persian administrative institutions and court etiquette; the Sikh silver rupees were minted on the Mughal standard with Persian legends.

Historian Robina Yasmin, on the other hand, argues against the stereotypical narratives of claimed anti-Muslim oppression by the Sikh Empire. After researching contemporary sources held in the Fakir Khana archives in Pakistan and England, she concluded that the Sikh rulers were secular and allowed their Muslim subjects to freely practice their religion. She also points out the fact that during the reign of the Sikh Empire in Punjab, there was never a single case of rebellion against the Sikh authorities by Muslims. She further claims any beliefs of maltreatment of Muslims is based upon misunderstandings of the condition of the Muslim community during the Sikh Empire.

=== Colonial period ===
==== Religious syncretism ====
During the colonial era, the practice of religious syncretism among Punjabi Muslims and Punjabi Hindus was noted and documented by officials in census reports:

"In other parts of the Province, too, traces of Hindu festivals are noticeable among the Muhammadans. In the western Punjab, Baisakhi, the new year's day of the Hindus, is celebrated as an agricultural festival, by all Muhammadans, by racing bullocks yoked to the well gear, with the beat of tom-toms, and large crowds gather to witness the show, The race is called Baisakhi and is a favourite pastime in the well-irrigated tracts. Then the processions of tazias, in Muharram, with the accompaniment of tom-toms, fencing parties and bands playing on flutes and other musical instruments (which is disapproved by the orthodox Muhammadans) and the establishment of Sabils (shelters where water and sharbat are served out) are clearly influenced by similar practices at Hindu festivals, while the illuminations on occasions like the Chiraghan fair of Shalamar (Lahore) are no doubt practices answering to the holiday-making instinct of the converted Hindus."

— Excerpt from the Census of India (Punjab Province), 1911

==== War of Independence (1857) ====
The news of the Rebellion of 1857 reached Punjab quite late. Jhelum in Punjab saw a rebellion in which 35 British soldiers were killed on 7 July 1857. Among the dead was Captain Francis Spring, the eldest son of Colonel William Spring. On 9 July, most of the brigade of sepoys at Sialkot rebelled and began to move to Delhi. They were intercepted by John Nicholson with an equal British force as they tried to cross the Ravi River. After fighting steadily but unsuccessfully for several hours, the sepoys tried to fall back across the river but became trapped on an island, they were defeated by Nicholson in the Battle of Trimmu Ghat. However, the main opponent of British rule in Punjab was Rai Ahmad Khan from Kharral clan who waged war against it for three months in central Punjab. He was killed on 21 September 1857 in a skirmish with British colonial forces while inflicting heavy losses to the British.

==== From Punjabi to Punjabi Muslim identity ====
Before British annexation of Punjab, the consciousness of a Punjabi identity was at its zenith. Writing in the 1840s, the Punjabi Muslim poet Shah Mohammad viewed Anglo-Sikh wars as war between the Punjab and Hind (India).

However, during the colonial period, communal identity began to slowly supersede a more regional one, and Punjabi Muslims increasingly disowned Punjabi language in the favour of Urdu in Persian script as an indication of rising Islamic nationalism. As a sign of a growing sense of Muslim self-identity, it has been estimated that out of the 70,000 to 80,000 books and pamphlets printed in Punjab from 1867 to 1914 some 25,000 to 30,000 "were written by a Muslim or published to meet the needs of the [Muslim] community."

Historian Farina Mir estimates that out of the 413 periodicals and newspapers published in Punjab between 1880 and 1905, 343 or 82% were in Urdu. She also shows that books were mostly published in Urdu, with a lowest of 35% of all the books from Punjab being in Urdu in 1870-1871 (followed by Hindi with 18%) and a highest of 51% in 1885-1886 (followed by Hindi with 15%). Of all the years surveyed (from 1870-1871 to 1902-1903), in 1875-1876 Arabic was the second most popular language (9%) while Punjabi was the second most popular language during the following years: 1879-1880 (18%), 1889-1890 and 1895-1896 (both 23%) and 1902-1903 (28%).

==== Industrial and technical workforce ====
During the late colonial period, Punjabi Muslims were significantly represented in technical occupations, particularly in railway workshops. The Mughalpura Railway Workshops near Lahore, established in 1874, were among the largest in British India and by 1947 contained over 4,000 machine tools. Additional workshops in regions that later became Pakistan held a further 1,000 to 1,500 machine tools. These facilities expanded during the Second World War to support military production, while bridge-building workshops in Jhelum contributed to railway and road infrastructure. Skilled labor in these sectors included turners, fitters, machinists, and foundry workers, alongside engineering staff at various levels. Contemporary accounts note that occupational patterns, influenced in part by the caste system, contributed to a strong presence of Muslim workers in certain technical trades. By 1947, over 14,000 skilled Muslim workers were employed in the Mughalpura workshops alone. As summarized in one account, "Therefore, one profession where Punjabi Muslims had an edge over Punjabi Hindus and Sikhs was in engineering skills."

==== In the British Indian Army ====
Punjabi Muslims, classified as a "martial race" by the British colonialists, made a substantial part of the British Indian Army. British academic David Omissi called them the single largest group in both World Wars, at the eve of World War II accounting for around 29% of its total numbers. Due to these reasons, another British academic, Kate Imy, writes that "Punjabi Muslims were the true backbone of the Indian Army." Most were recruited from the Pothohar Plateau.

However, there was also a history of popular resistance from Punjabi Muslims against British colonialism, including during the 1857 Indian Rebellion with the likes of Rai Ahmad Khan Kharal, facts which historian Turab-ul-Hassan Sargana says have been undermined because the elites of Punjab who collaborated with the British are those who still rule Pakistan today.

Due to their heavy involvement with the British Indian Army, the Punjabi Muslims would know a form of social mobility and economic empowerement that would differentiate them from non-Punjabi Muslims of the region, Indian defence analyst Colonel RSN Singh writing that "the economic and social hiatus between Punjabi Muslims and the Muslims of the Indian heartland widened to the extent that the latter had ceased to be a force of any consequence."

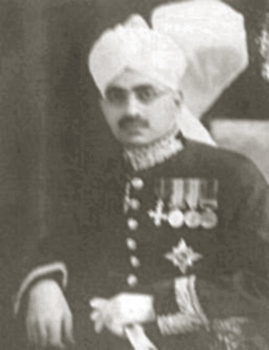
Sir Sikandar Hayat Khan was the first Premier of the Punjab

==== Administrative reforms ====
The Government of India Act 1935 introduced provincial autonomy to Punjab replacing the system of dyarchy. It provided for the constitution of Punjab Legislative Assembly of 175 members presided by a Speaker and an executive government responsible to the Assembly. The Unionist Party under a Punjabi Muslim, Sir Sikandar Hayat Khan formed the government in 1937. Sir Sikandar was succeeded by Malik Khizar Hayat Tiwana in 1942 who remained the Premier till partition in 1947. Although the term of the Assembly was five years, the Assembly continued for about eight years and its last sitting was held on 19 March 1945.

==== Majlis-e Ahrar-e Islam ====
During the 1930s and the 1940s, the Majlis-e Ahrar-e Islam, an anti-colonial Islamist political party founded in 1929 as an offshoot of the Khilafat Movement and a close collaborator of the Indian National Congress, became the dominant political force among Punjabi Muslims, especially among the lower middle echelons and the artisan classes, the Ahrar's having a diversity of Islamic schools but generally subscribed to a Deobandi interpretation with an Islamic socialist approach as well.

=== After independence ===
During the Partition of 1947, millions also migrated from East Punjab to West Punjab to escape violence from Hindu and Sikh militias. After independence, Bengalis formed the majority ethnicity of Pakistan, followed by Punjabis. After 1971, Punjabis became the majority ethnicity.

A 2009 Pew Research Center report found that 96% of Punjabis in Pakistan identified primarily as Pakistani when choosing between national and ethnic identities, the highest proportion among all surveyed groups, surpassing both Pashtuns and Muhajirs, who each stood at 92%.

== Culture ==
=== Sufism ===
Sufism has also played a major role in the history of Punjab. Many prominent Sufi saints were born in Punjab, including Fariduddin Ganjshakar, Waris Shah and Bulleh Shah.

=== Language ===
Punjabi Muslims had a major contribution in the development of Punjabi language. Fariduddin Ganjshakar (1179–1266) is recognised as the first major poet of the Punjabi language. Roughly from the 12th century to the 19th century, many great Sufi saints and poets preached in the Punjabi language, the most prominent being Bulleh Shah. Punjabi Sufi poetry also developed under Shah Hussain (1538–1599), Sultan Bahu (1630–1691), Shah Sharaf (1640–1724), Ali Haider (1690–1785), Waris Shah (1722–1798), Saleh Muhammad Safoori (1747–1826), Mian Muhammad Baksh (1830–1907) and Khwaja Ghulam Farid (1845–1901).

=== Literature ===
The Punjabi language is famous for its rich literature of qisse, most of which are about love, passion, betrayal, sacrifice, social values and a common man's revolt against a larger system. The qissa of Heer Ranjha by Waris Shah (1706–1798) is among the most popular of Punjabi qissas. Other popular stories include Sohni Mahiwal by Fazal Shah, Mirza Sahiban by Hafiz Barkhudar (1658–1707), Sassui Punnhun by Hashim Shah (c. 1735–c. 1843), and Qissa Puran Bhagat by Qadaryar (1802–1892). In contrast to Persian poets, who had preferred the ghazal for poetic expression, Punjabi Sufi poets tended to compose in the Kafi. Popular modern-era writers and poets include Sahir Ludhianvi and Irshad Kamil.

=== Music ===
Punjabi music is used by western musicians in many ways, such as mixing with other compositions. Sufi music and Qawali, commonly practiced in Punjab, Pakistan; are other important genres in the Punjab region.

Folk music of Punjab is the traditional music of Punjab produced using traditional musical instruments like Tumba, Algoza, Dhadd, Sarangi, Chimta and more. There is a wide range of folk songs for every occasion from birth to death including marriage, festivals, fairs and religious ceremonies.

== Demographics ==
Punjabi Muslims are found almost exclusively in Pakistan with 98% of Punjabis who live in Pakistan following Islam, in contrast to Punjabi Sikhs and Punjabi Hindus who predominantly live in India. Around 221,000 Muslims in the Indian state of Punjab are ethnic Punjabis, located around—Malerkotla and the towns of Qadian and Sirhind and in smaller numbers in Mumbai and Delhi. Thus religious homogeneity remains elusive as a predominant Sunni population with Shia, Ahmadiyya and Christian minorities.

=== Numbers and trends ===
While the total population of Punjab is 127 million as noted in the 2023 Pakistan census, ethnic Punjabis comprise approximately 44.7% of the national population, estimated at 252,364,571 as of 2024. Ethnic Punjabis, that is, discounting the local Kashmiris, Pashtuns and Baloch residents, thus number approximately 112,807,000 million in Pakistan; this makes Punjabis the largest ethnic group in Pakistan by population.

As per a 2025 Dawn News report, based on data compiled by research organisation Population Council, UK Aid and the United Nations Population, Pakistan's Punjab had an annual growth rate of 2.53%. According to demographic projections, if the province’s current total fertility rate of 3.4 children per woman remains unchanged, Punjab’s population could more than double to approximately 253 million by 2050.

=== Tribes and clans ===
Punjabi Muslim society is centered around the concept of biraderi (برادری), social brotherhood within the tribe and clan.

The major tribes and clans among Punjabi Muslims are the Jats, Rajputs, Arains, Ansari, Sheikh, Gujjars and Awans.

In his 1911-book The Armies of India, British major Sir George Fletcher MacMunn would write that Muslims of Punjab "are of many mixed races, but who largely consist of Rajput tribes converted to Islam at various times in the past."

== See also ==
- History of Punjab
- List of Punjabi Muslims
- List of Punjabi Muslim tribes
- Jat Muslim
- Punjabi people
- List of rulers of Pothohar Plateau
- Islam in Pakistan
- Anjuman-i-Himayat-i-Islam, Punjabi Muslim organisation active in colonial Punjab
- Shahmukhi alphabet, the script used by Punjabi Muslims to read and write Punjabi
- Muslim Khatris
- Qanungoh Shaikh
