= Dobhashi =

Variety of Bengali

- দোভাষী دوبھاشي
- Region: Bengal, Arakan
- Era: 18th-19th century
- Language family: Indo-European: Indo-Iranian; Indo-Aryan; Eastern; Bengali-Assamese; Middle Bengali; Dobhashi
- Writing system: Eastern Nagri; Perso-Arabic

Language codes
- ISO 639-3: –
- Glottolog: vang1242 Vanga

Dobhashi (Bengali: দোভাষী, دوبھاشي, romanized: Dōbhāṣī, lit. 'Bilingual') is a neologism used to refer to a historical register of the Bengali language which borrowed extensively, in all aspects, from Arabic and Persian. It became the most customary form for composing puthi poetry predominantly using the traditional Bengali alphabet. However, Dobhashi literature was produced in the modified Arabic scripts of Chittagong and Nadia. The standardisation of the modern Bengali language during the colonial period, eventually led to its decline.

== Name ==
No name has been recorded for this register during its development and practice. In the 19th century, an Anglican priest called James Long coined the term Musalmani Bengali, which was also adopted by linguists such as Suniti Kumar Chatterji in the early 20th century. Sukumar Sen referred to it as Muslim Bengali. In 1921, the Islam Darshan monthly published an article on Bengali Muslim literature which referred to the register as Islami Bangla and considered its literature to be the "national literature" of Bengali Muslims. In 1968, Muhammad Abdul Hye and Syed Ali Ahsan published their History of Bengali literature where they coined the name Dobhashi, meaning 'bilingual', which came to be the most popular name for the register. Kazi Abdul Mannan was an advocate for the name Dobashi, as he opines that the register's usage was "not limited to Muslims".

== Structure ==
Article 1 of the Universal Declaration of Human Rights in Dobhashi Bengali.

Dobhashi Bengali was highly influenced by Arabic and Persian and in poetry, could grammatically change to adapt to Persian grammar without sounding odd to the reader. Arabic and Persian words in the register accounted for the majority of its vocabulary. As in most other foreign languages of Islamic communities, the Arabic borrowings were borrowed through Persian, not through direct exposure of Bengali to Arabic, a fact that is evidenced by the typically Persian phonological mutation of the words of Arabic origin. Dobhashi was also used for forms of story-telling like Puthi, Kissa, Jangnama, Raag, Jarigan, Hamd, Naʽat and Ghazal. Educated Bengalis would be multilingual and multi-literate enabling them to study and engage with Persian, Arabic and Bengali literature. Dobhashi manuscripts are paginated from right to left, imitating the Arabic-tradition.

The following is a sample text in Dobhashi Bengali of Article 1 of the Universal Declaration of Human Rights by the United Nations:

Dobhashi Bengali in the Bengali script

দফা ১: তামাম ইনসান আজ়াদ হইয়া সমান ইজ্জত আর হক লইয়া পয়দা হয়। তাঁহাদের হুঁশ ও আকল আছে; তাই একজন আরেক জনের সাথে বেরাদর হিসাবে সুলূক করা জ়রূরী।

Dobhashi Bengali in a modified Arabic script

دفا ١: تَمام اِنسان آزاد ھَئیا شَمان عِزّت ار حَقّ لئیا پَیدا ھَئي۔ تاهَدير ھوش و عَقل اچھے؛ تائي ايكجَن ارِك جَنير شاتھے بِرادَر حِسابے سُلوك كَرا ضَروري۔

Dobhashi Bengali in phonetic Romanization

Dôfa ek: Tamām insān āzād hôiyā shômān izzôt ār haq lôiyā payda hôy. Tãhāder hũsh ō āql āchhe; tāi ekjôn ārek jôner shāthe berādôr hisābe sulūk kôra zarūrī.

Gloss

Point 1: All humans free manner-in equal dignity and right taken birth be. Their conscience and intelligence exist; thus one-person another person's with brother as behaviour do important.

English Translation

Article 1: All human beings are born free and equal in dignity and rights. They possess conscience and reason. Therefore, everyone should act in a spirit of brotherhood towards each other.

== History ==
=== Influence on Bengali ===
The arrival of merchants, traders and missionaries from Arabia, Persia and Turkestan to the Buddhist Pala Empire from as early as the 7th century led to Islamic influence in the modern-day Bengal region. After Bakhtiyar Khalji's conquest in the 13th century, subsequent Muslim expeditions to Bengal encouraged the migration of Arabic and Persian-speaking Muslims, who settled among the native population and greatly influenced the local language. Thus Bengali derived a large number of words from Persian and Arabic, which then seeped into its literature. Bengali was practised and taught culturally among households, and was also promoted and supported by the Muslim dynasties who ruled over Bengal. Under the Sultanate of Bengal, Bengali was established as an official language, contrary to previous states which had exclusively favoured Sanskrit, Pali and Persian.

The 14th-century Bengali Islamic scholar Nur Qutb Alam composed poetry in both Persian and Bengali using only the Persian alphabet. The late 14th-century Sultan of Bengal, Ghiyathuddin Azam Shah, Turco-Persian in origin, was a patron of literature and poetry. His court poet, Shah Muhammad Saghir, was reportedly the first to use Islamic terminology such as Allah, Rasul and Alim in the native Bengali native script. His best known work is Yusuf-Zulekha. From as early as the 14th century, the use of Persian loanwords in Bengali literature became common, such as the works of Zainuddin, Syed Sultan, Bahram Khan Abdul Hakim and Heyat Mahmud. The influence also reached Bengali Hindu writers too, with medieval authors such as Bipradas Pipilai and the Chandimangal poets implementing a large quantity of loanwords, as well as the courts of Arakan through the likes of Alaol and Daulat Qazi.

Bharatchandra Ray, referred to the newly common language as "jabônī miśal", meaning Yāvanī-mixed. He says:

মানসিংহ পাতশায় হইল যে বাণী, উচিত যে আরবী পারসী হিন্দুস্থানী;

পড়িয়াছি সেই মত বৰ্ণিবারে পারি, কিন্তু সে সকল লোকে বুঝিবারে ভারি,

না রবে প্রসাদ গুণ না হবে রসাল, অতএব কহি ভাষা যাবনী মিশাল।

mansingh patshay hôilô je baṇī, uchit je arôbī, parsī, hindustanī
poriyachhi shei môtô bôrṇibare pari, kintu she shôkôl loke bujhibare bhari
na rôbe prôshad guṇ na hôbe rôshal, ôtôeb kôhi bhasha jabônī mishal

This translates to: "The appropriate language for conversation between Mansingh and the Emperor are Arabic, Persian and Hindustani (especially in the Urdu form). I had studied these languages, and I could use them; but they are difficult for people to understand. They lack grace and juice (poetic quality). I have chosen, therefore, the Yāvanī-mixed (language)". The term "Yāvanī" literally referred to the Greeks, however was later repurposed to indicate Muslims.

=== Literary culture ===
Dobhashi literature is not considered to merely be the use of Persian loanwords in Bengali literature, but rather represents a phenomenon which developed much later, in the 18th century with the British Raj. Shah Faqir Gharibullah of Howrah is considered to be the pioneer of this new strand of Bengali literature, which actively utilised Perso-Arab vocabulary as opposed to only using established loanwords. He initiated the trend of Muslim puthis with the puthi Amir Hamza and his successors even transcribed his Bengali works using the Arabic script. Another notable example of the use of Arabic script is a late 19th-century Bengali theological work, which is now kept in the Bangladesh National Museum.

Medieval tales of Persian origin such as Gul-e-Bakavali were being translated to Dobhashi and being popularised in Bengal. Dobhashi puthis about the latter tale were written by the likes of Munshi Ebadat Ali in 1840. Muhammad Fasih was also a renowned Dobhashi puthi writer who was known to have written a 30-quatrain chautisa (poetic genre using all letters of the alphabet) using Arabic letters, totalling 120 lines.

The famous Bangladeshi academic, Wakil Ahmed, states that Jaiguner Puthi (Puthi of Jaigun), written by Syed Hamzah of Udna, Hugli-Chuchura in 1797, is "one of the finest examples" of puthis in Dobhashi. It took inspiration from earlier Bengali Muslim works such as Hanifar Digbijoy by Shah Barid Khan and Hanifar Lorai by Muhammad Khan (1724). Muhammad Khater was a late Dobhashi writer who wrote a puthi about ill-fated lovers in 1864, taking inspiration from the 16th century Bengali poet Dawlat Wazir Bahram Khan.

=== Decline ===
The English Education Act 1835 banned the use of Persian and Arabic in education. Nathaniel Brassey Halhed, an employee of the East India Company, worked towards standardising modern Bengali and considered the Arabic and Persian loanwords as pollutants and dismissed them from his work. Dobhashi is considered to have lost popularity as a highly Sanskritised form of Sadhu bhasha was institutionalised by the British, who worked alongside the educated Brahmins that had chosen to accept English as the official language. In reaction to Sanskritisation, many Bengali Muslims that refused to learn English took to the initiative to continue Dobhashi literature hoping to maintain their identity and linguistic traditions. It was during this time that the register came to be known as Musalmani Bengali by the Christian Missionaries in Bengal, who had begun translating the Bible in order to reach the Bengali-speaking Muslim community. This was achieved by William Goldsack who composed the first Mussalmani Bengali-English dictionary. In the mid-nineteenth century, printing houses in Calcutta and across Bengal, were producing hundreds and hundreds of Musalmani Bengali literature. On the other hand, many Hindus such as Rabindranath Tagore also opposed the highly Sanskritised variant and opted for a standard based on the colloquial dialect of Nadia. In 1863, Nawab Abdul Latif founded the Mohammedan Literary Society, which also rejected the idea of a single Standard Bengali and promoted the separation of Bengali based on religious background.

Nowadays, traditional Dobhashi is mostly used for research purposes though it is sometimes used to achieve particular literary effects. Remnants of the register are present in regional Bengali dialects, in particular amongst rural Muslim communities in eastern Bengal. The 20th century educationist and researcher, Dr. Kazi Abdul Mannan (d. 1994), wrote his thesis on The Emergence and Development of Dobhasi Literature in Bengal (up to 1855 AD) for his PhD from University of Dhaka in 1966.

== See also ==
- Abdul Karim Sahitya Bisharad, historian who discovered hundreds of lost medieval literature and writers
- Bengali Kissa, popular genre found in Dobhashi literature
- Bengali poetry
- Puthi, popular genre found in Dobhashi literature
- Yusuf-Zulekha, an early Dobhashi work
