= Jangnama =

jangnama, is an epic or heroic poem in the Bangladeshi, Indian, Irani and Pakistani literatures. The word is of Persian origin. In Kashmiri, jangnama refers to epic poetry generally; but jangnama also identifies a specific genre of poetry that deals with Islamic conquests. The genre also exists in many Muslim-influenced Indo-Aryan languages.

== Different jangnamas ==
A variety of different jangnamas were written in the years before 1850; they include:

- Janganama Zainab's Chautisa by Sheikh Faizullah (16th century)
- Janganama by Dawlat Wazir Bahram Khan (16th century)
- Jangnama Muqtal Husayn by Mohammad Khan Islamabadi (1645)
- Jangnama by Abdul Hakim (1723)
- Zari Jangnama Maharamparba by Heyat Mahmud (1723)
- Qasim-er Lodai O Fatima-r Suratnama by Sherbaz (18th century)
- Shahid-e-Karbala O Sakina-r Bilaap by Zafar (18th century)
- Shongram Husayn by Hamid (18th century)
- Janganama Amir Hamza by Gharibullah
- Jangnama Hanifa (Zaiguner Pathi) by Sayad Hamza
- Jangnama by Radhacaran Gop
- Jangnama by Nasrullah Khan

== Punjabi jangnamas ==
- Jangnama by Hamid Shah, it was written in the 18th century
- Jangnama by Maulvi Ghulam Mustifa
- Jang Ahd by Ahmad Yar
- Jang Badan by Ahmad Yar
- Jangnama Lahore by Kahan Singh
- Jangnama Hari Singh by Ram Dayal
- Jangnama Delhi Khazan Singh
- Jangnama Kabul Kandhar by Siam
- Jangnama Kabul by Karam Singh
- Jangnama Khaibar by Mirza Abdul Hamid
- Jang Europe by Havinder Nand Singh
- Jang Chitral by Kahan Singh
- Jang Singhaan te Angrezan by Shah Mohammad

as well as the anonymous Jang Chitral, Jang Chin, Jang Tiraj, and Jang Zaitun. Jangnamahs were also written in more recent times; one example is Jangnamah Europe by a Sikh soldier, Nand Singh, who fought in the First World War.

== See also ==
- Dobhashi
- Bengali Kissa
- Punjabi Qisse
- Vaar
