= Qissa =

Qissa (Arabic: قِصَّة), meaning fable, could refer to:

- Bengali Kissa, a tradition of Bengali language oral story-telling
- Punjabi Qisse, a tradition of Punjabi language oral story-telling
- Qissa (film), a 2013 Indian-German film in Punjabi by Anup Singh
- Qissa Khawani Bazaar, a bazaar in Peshawar, Pakistan
- Qissa-i Sanjan, an account of the early years of Zoroastrian settlers on the Indian subcontinent
- Qissa-e Parsi: The Parsi Story, a 2014 Indian documentary film about Parsis
