= Bengali Kissa =

A Bengali Kissa (Bengali: বাংলা কিসসা/কিচ্ছা, romanized: Bangla Kissa/Kiccha), also known as Keccha (Bengali: কেচ্ছা), is a genre of Bengali poetry and prose as well as a tradition in the Bengali language of oral story-telling. It started flourishing in Bengal with the fusion of local Bengali folklore and stories from the Arab and Turco-Persian immigrants. The art form remains popular amongst the rural Muslim communities of Bangladesh.

Where Kissa reflect an Islamic and/or Persian heritage of transmitting popular tales of love, valour, honour and moral integrity amongst Muslims, they matured out of the bounds of religion into a more secular form when it reached Bengal and added the existing pre-Islamic Bengali culture and folklore to its entity.

== Etymology and pronunciation ==
The word Kissa originates from the Arabic word Qissa (قصه) meaning ‘epic legend’ or ‘folk tale’. It has influenced many languages of the Indian subcontinent and occurs as a regular common noun in Indo-Aryan languages like Bengali, Gujarati, Urdu and Hindi. If used informally, the word means an ‘interesting tale’ or ‘fable’.

== History ==
Kissa is said to have gained immense popularity in Bengal from the 15th century onward. Bengali Muslim writers would mix Perso-Arab themes of love, war, religion and valour into their Kissas. The Dobhashi dialect of Bengali was a popular standard for writing. It was heavily influenced in vocabulary by Persian, the official language of Mughal Bengal and the Bengal Sultanate (which preceded British colonial Bengal). The nineteenth century hosted the establishment of many Kissa publishing companies across Bengal, in particular the printing presses at Battala. Literary societies were being founded such as the Mussalmani Kissa Sahitya in Howrah. Towards the start of the twentieth century however, Kissa had lost its popularity. It is considered to have lost popularity alongside the Dobhashi dialect as the Standard variant of Bengali (Shadhu-bhasha), which was highly Sanskritised, became more institutionalised. This is evident in later Kissas such as Mir Mosharraf Hossain's Bishad Shindhu, based on the traditional Bengali kissa about the Battle of Karbala, which he wrote in the late 19th century in Sanskritised Shadhu-bhasha instead of Persianised Dobhashi.

== Notability ==
Written Bengali kissas became household items in Bengali Muslim families. Shah Muhammad Sagir's Yusuf-Zulekha from the 15th century was considered to be the greatest work of medieval Bengali literature. Bahram Khan of Chittagong made his own version of Laila and Majnun which he called "Laily-Majnu". In nearby Satkania, the poet Nawazish Khan, son of Muhammad Yar Khandakar, wrote Gule Bakawali which was also about love and included creatures such as fairies. Many different versions of the stories mentioned were written by the poets of Bengal. Other famous Kissas include Amir Hamza, Madhumalati, Farhad and Shirin, Tutinama, Hatemtai, Sakhi Sona, Jangnama, Alif-Laila wa Laila and Gule Tarmuz. Notable writers, other than those listed above, included Syed Hamza, Naser Ali, Roushan Ali and Fakir Shah Garibullah.

== See also ==
- Punjabi Qisse
