= Ahmad Yar =

Punjabi poet and historian (1768–1845)

Aḥmad Yār (1768–1845) was a Punjabi poet and historian from Gujrat, Punjab. He served as a court poet for Maharaja Ranjit Singh.

== Biography ==
Ahmad Yar was born in 1768 at Islamgarh in Gujrat District. His date of birth is based on his own comment that he was seventy when he was appointed to write Shāhnāma-yi Ranjīt Singh in 1838. At his youth, he left Islamgarh to live in Murala, where he spent most of his life and died in 1845.

== Literary works ==
Ahmad Yar was a prolific writer, producing more than forty Punjabi Qisse during his lifetime. He was also a polyglot, and wrote in Punjabi, Arabic, Persian and Braj Bhasha on a variety of subjects including medicine (Ṭibb-i Aḥmad-Yārī), history (Shāhnāma, a Persian chronicle of Ranjit Singh’s court), Islam (Jang-e-Aḥmad), and romance (Hīr Rānjhā, Sohńī Mahīṃwāl, Laila-Majnun and Sassī Punnūṃ, among others). Although he wrote a number of devotional poems such as Sharḥ duʿā suryānī, Ḥulya mubārak Rasūl-i maqbūl and Miʿrāj-nāma, there is no evidence that Ahmad Yar was affiliated to any Sufi order.

== Bibliography ==
- Shackle, Christopher (2007). "Aḥmad Yār". In Fleet, Kate; Krämer, Gudrun; Matringe, Denis; Nawas, John; Rowson, Everett (eds.). Encyclopaedia of Islam (3rd ed.). Brill Online. doi:10.1163/1573-3912_ei3_SIM_0246. ISSN 1873-9830.
- Khan, Pasha Mohamad (2013). "Panegyric". The Broken Spell: The Romance Genre in Late Mughal India (Thesis). Columbia University. pp. 141–175. doi:10.7916/d8bg2w2c.
- Mir, Farina (2010). The Social Space of Language: Vernacular Culture in British Colonial Punjab. South Asia across the Disciplines. Berkeley: University of California Press. ISBN 978-0-520-26269-0.
- Kanwar, P. S. (1987). "Ahmad Yar". In Datta, Amaresh (ed.). Encyclopaedia of Indian Literature. Vol. I: A to Devo. Sahitya Akademi. ISBN 978-0-8364-2283-2.
