= Hashim Shah =

Punjabi writer and Sufi poet

- ہاشم شاہ
- Born: 1735 or 1752; Jagdev Kalan, Amritsar, Punjab
- Died: 1843 (aged 108) or 1823; Ajnala village Jagdev Kalan in Amritsar district, Punjab
- Resting place: Tharpal, Narowal District, Punjab, Pakistan
- Relatives: Muhammad Sharif (father); Rajni Mai (mother)
- Writing career
- Notable works: Sassui Punnhun, Sohni Mahiwal, and Shirin Farhad

Syed Hashim Shah (Punjabi ہاشم شاہسید (Shahmukhi), ਹਾਸ਼ਿਮ ਸ਼ਾਹ (Gurmukhi); 1735–1843) was a Punjabi writer and Sufi poet, best known for his Sassi Punnun (or Sassi Panhu). In his poetic compositions his prosody is Punjabi though his vocabulary abounds in Hindi, Persian and Arabic words.

== Biography ==
Syed Hashim Shah was born in Jagdev Kalan in 1735 and lived in that village his entire life. He wrote three stories "Kissa Kaw" named Sassi Punnu, Sohni Mahiwal, and Shirin Farhad.

Hashim, besides following the family tradition of hikmat (physician), copunselling and Piri-Muridi, also worked as a carpenter for sustenance. He left the profession of carpentry when Maharaja Ranjit Singh and his courtiers extended their patronage to Hashim. Thereafter, he devoted his entire life to spiritual attainments and composing Sufistic (mystic) poetry.

Syed Hashim Shah died in Ajnala, 1843 or 1823 and was buried in Tharpal village in Narowal District where every year Urs was held on or about 21st of Jeth (end May – early June).

== Style ==
His poetry has a certain style reverberating with description and sometimes sadness. Sufism ran in Hashim's family. He, his father and grandfather practised piri-muridi. He took Sufism as an established belief. His Punjabi poetry reverberates with mysticism of high order and can be allegorically interpreted for Love Divine.

== Works ==
He has written the following books:

- Qissa Shirin Farhad
- Qissa Sohni Mahiwal
- Qissa Sassi Punnun
- Gyan Prakash
- Gyan Mala
- Bara Mah (Farsi)
- Dohre
- Bayad Hashim
- C Harfiyan
- Chintahar (Hindi)
- Qulyat e Hashim
- Dewan Hashim
- Faqar Nama
- Ghazaliat (Farsi)
- Ilm ul Ramal
- Khazain ul Asrar (چہار بہار)
- Kutab e Tib
- Masnavi Hashim
- Masnavi Yousaf Zulaikha
- Manajat
- Panj Granthi (Hindi)
- Pothi Hikmat
- Qasaid (Farsi)
- Raj Neeti (Hindi)
- Shalook (Gurmukhi)
- Tapka (Hindi) & many more
