= Fazal Shah Sayyad =

19th-century Punjabi poet (1827–1890)

Fazal Shah Syed (Note: Punjabi: فضل شاہ سید) (1827–1890) was a 19th-century Punjabi poet known for his qissas (long poems) on tragic romances, most notably Sohni Mahiwal, Sassi Pannu, Heer Ranjha and Laila Majnu. Among his literary works, Sohni Mahinwal is considered to be the best. He was based in Lahore.

He was born in 1827 in Punjab during the Sikh rule and resided in Nawan Kot, a suburb of Lahore (present-day Punjab, Pakistan) where he died in 1890.
