= Shah Muhammad Saghir =

Shah Muhammad Sagir
- শাহ মুহম্মদ সগীর
- Born: 14th century (Note: exact date unknown); Chittagong, Sultanate of Bengal (now Bangladesh)
- Died: 15th century (Note: exact date unknown); Sultanate of Bengal (now Bangladesh)
- Occupation: Poet
- Era: 14th–15th century
- Known for: One of the earliest Bengali Muslim poets; pioneer of Bengali Islamic literature

Shah Muhammad Sagir (Bengali: শাহ মুহম্মদ সগীর) was a 15th-century Bengali poet. Notable for being one of the earliest Bengali Muslim poets, if not the first.

== Life ==
Shah Muhammad Sagir was a poet of the 14/15th century, during the reign of the Sultan of Bengal Ghiyasuddin Azam Shah. He was born to a Fakir family in Chittagong, the then cultural capital of Arakan.

His best-known work is Yusuf-Zulekha, which contains laudatory verses dedicated to Ghiyasuddin Azam Shah. He was the court poet of Azam Shah and wrote the volume at his request. Although it has praise for the parents and teachers of the poet, it does not mention their names or residence. Shah Muhammad Sagir is considered to be the first writer to introduce Perso-Arabic vocabulary into Bengali poetry.

Yusuf-Zulekha excerpt

ওস্তাদে প্রণাম কঁরো পিতা হন্তে বাড়
Ostade prônam kôro pita hônte baṛ
দোসর জনম দিলা তিহঁ সে আহ্মার
Dosôr jônôm dila tĩho she ahmar
(I respect my teacher more than my father;/ He has given me the second birth of knowledge)

== His works ==
- Yusuf-Zulekha
