= RSN Singh =

Indian army officer and writer

Col.RSN Singh

Colonel RSN Singh (Ravi Shekhar Narayan Singh) is a former Research and Analysis Wing (R&AW) officer and also a former Indian Army officer. He has written several books and has given talks on geopolitical defense and strategic issues, particularly from an Indian perspective.

== Videos ==
- Nepal Crisis

== Literary works ==
- Asian Strategic and Military Perspective (2005).
- Military Factor in Pakistan (2008).
- Know the Anti-Nationals (2021).
- The Jihadis Plus - Know the Anti-Nationals (2024), is a followup to Know the Anti-Nationals.
