= Khosrow and Shirin =

Persian tragic romance by Nizami Ganjavi

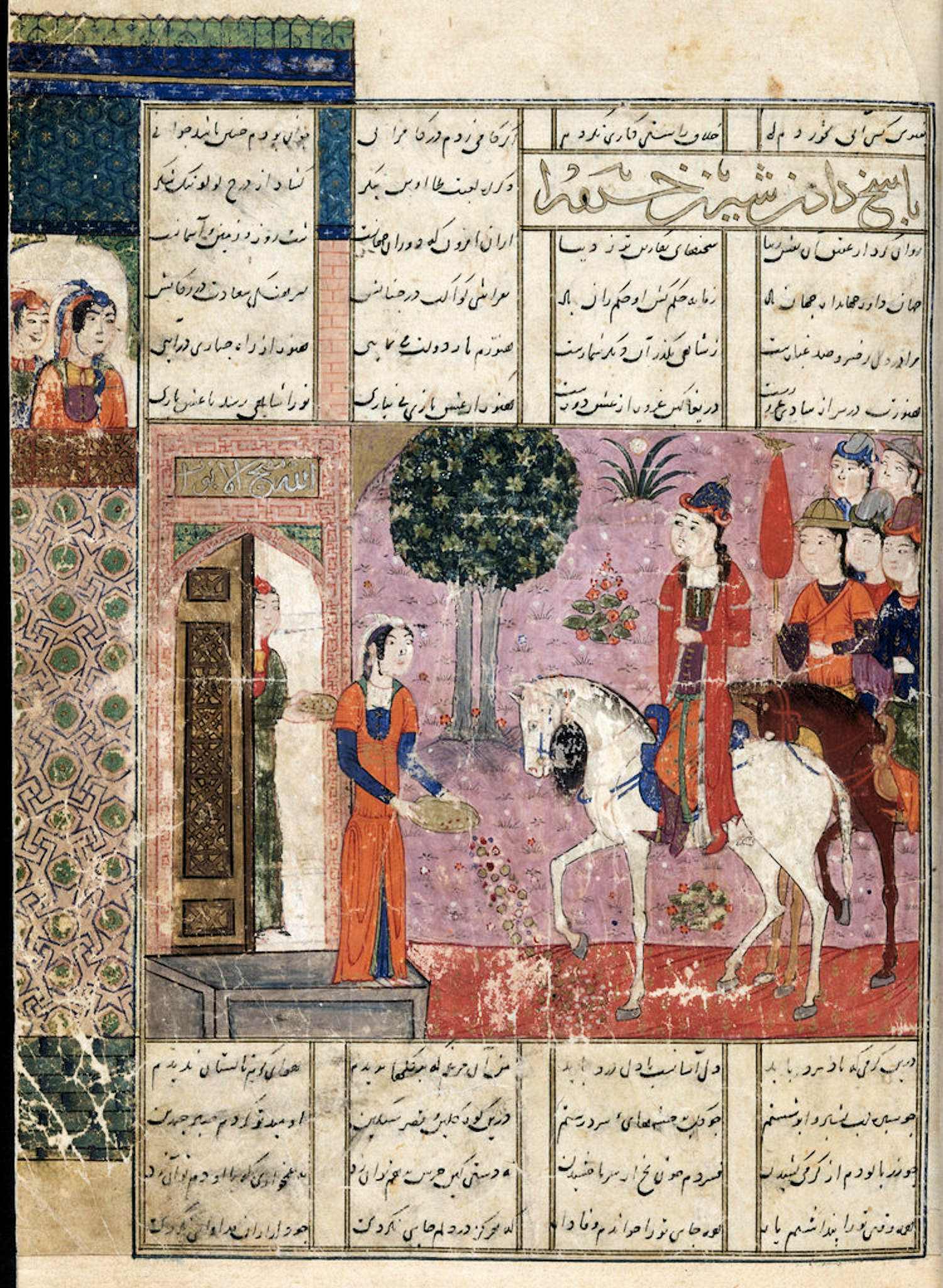
Khusrau at Shirin's castle in the earliest known illustrated Khamsa of Nizami: the Jalayirid manuscript British Library, Or.13297, created in Baghdad in 1386–88.

Khosrow and Shirin (Persian: خسرو و شیرین, romanized: Xusraw u Šīrīn) is a romantic epic poem by Nizami Ganjavi (1141–1209). It is the second work of his set of five poems known collectively as Khamsa. It tells a highly elaborated fictional version of the story of the love of Khosrow II for the Christian Shirin, who became the queen consort of the Sasanian Empire. The essential narrative is a romantic tale of Persian origin which was already well known from the great historical epic poem, the Shahnameh, as well as Persian writers and popular tales; other works have the same title. Variants of the story were also told under the title Shirin and Farhad (شیرین و فرهاد).

== Plot ==
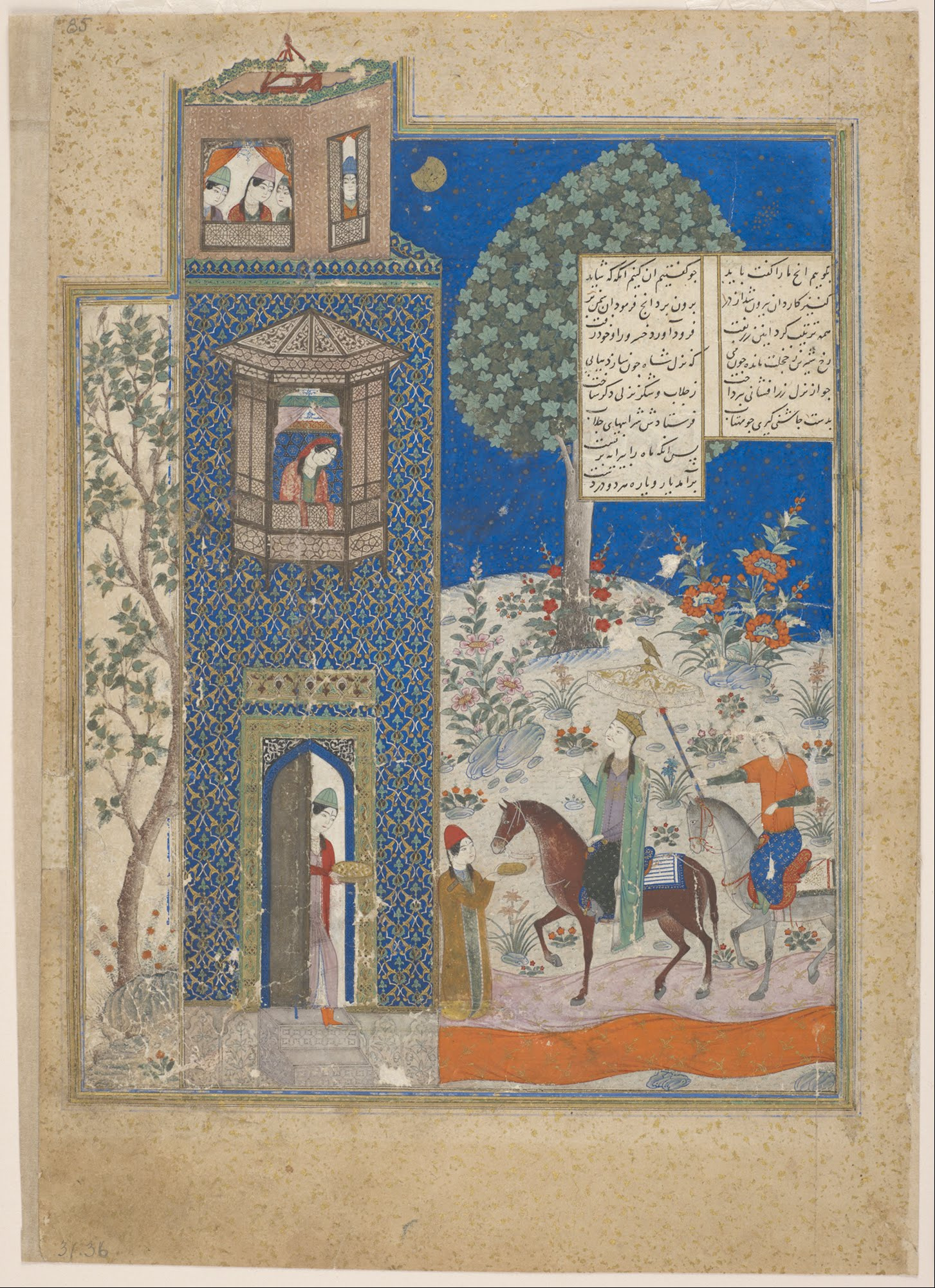
Khosrow Parviz and Shirin in a miniature. Jalayirid, circa 1400

Nizami's version begins with an account of Khosrow's birth and his education. This is followed by an account of Khosrow's feast in a farmer's house, for which Khosrow is severely chastised by his father, King Hormizd IV. Khosrow asks forgiveness and repents his offence. Hormizd IV, who is now pleased with his son, forgives him. That very night, Khosrow sees his grandfather Anushirvan in a dream. Anushirvan gives him glad tidings of a wife named Shirin, a steed named Shabdiz, a musician named Barbad, and a great kingdom, that is Iran.

Shapur, Khosrow's close friend and a painter, tells Khosrow of the Armenian queen Mahin Banu and her niece Shirin. Hearing Shapur's descriptions of Shirin's flawless features, the young prince falls in love with the Armenian princess. Shapur travels to Armenia to look for Shirin. Shapur finds Shirin and shows her an image of Khosrow. Shirin falls in love with Khosrow and escapes from Armenia to Khosrow's capital Mada'in. Meanwhile, however, Khosrow coincidentally also flees from his father's anger and sets out for Armenia in search of Shirin.

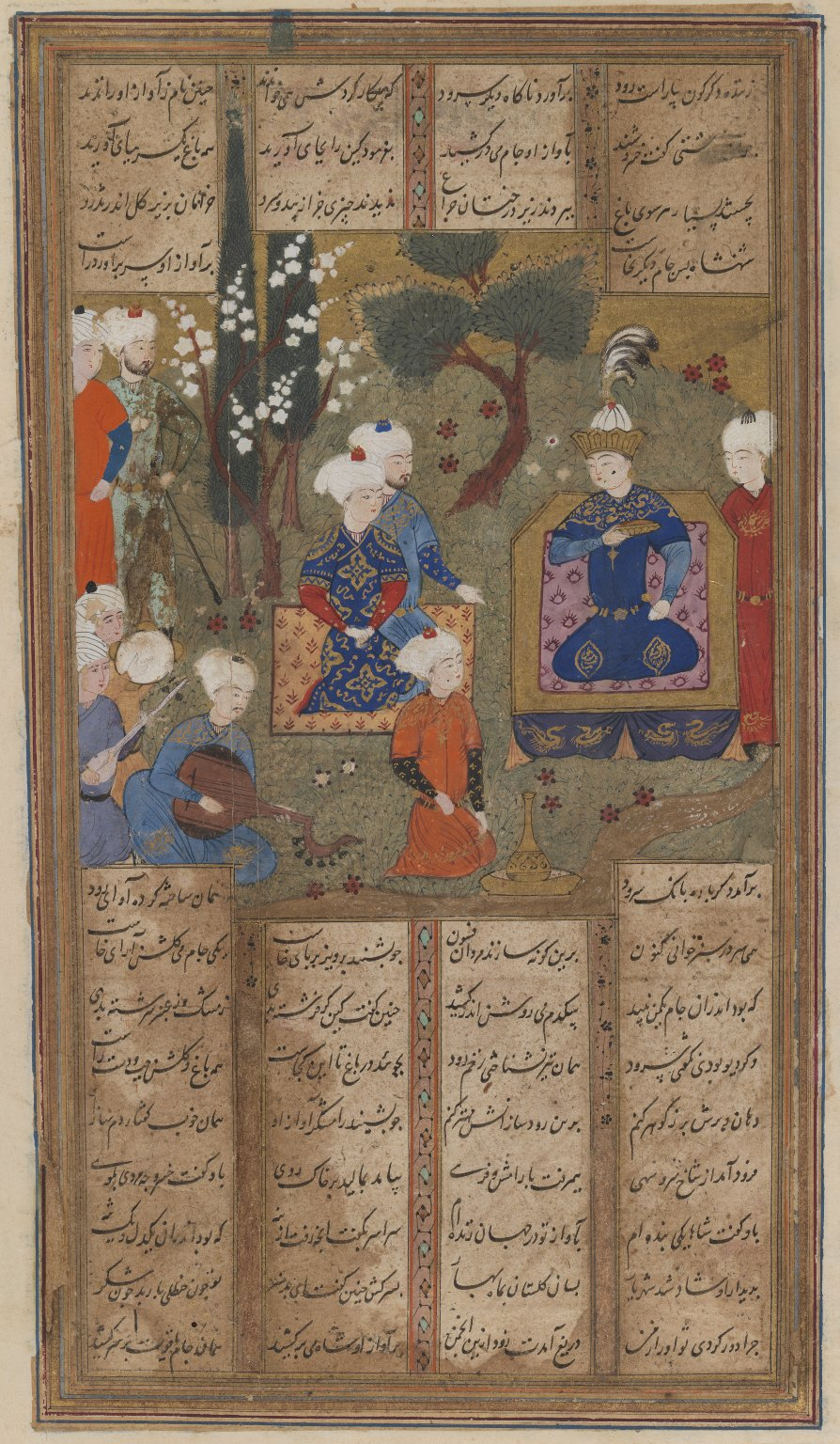
The Sasanian shah Khosraw and Courtiers in a Garden, Page from a manuscript of Ferdowsi's Shahnameh, late 15th-early 16th century. Brooklyn Museum.

On the way, he finds Shirin bathing and washing her flowing hair. Shirin also sees Khosrow, but since he was traveling in peasant clothes, they do not recognize one another. Khosrow arrives in Armenia and is welcomed by Shamira – and he finds out that Shirin is in Mada'in. Again, Shapur is sent to bring Shirin. When Shirin reaches Armenia, Khosrow – because of his father's death – has to return to Mada'in. The two lovers keep travelling to opposite places until Khosrow is overthrown by a general named Bahrām Chobin and flees to Armenia.

In Armenia, Khosrow finally meets Shirin and is welcomed by her. Shirin, however, will not agree to marry Khosrow unless he first claims his country back from Bahrām Chobin. Thus, Khosrow leaves Shirin in Armenia and goes to Constantinople. The Caesar agrees to assist him against Bahrām Chobin on condition that he marry his daughter Mariam. Khosrow is also forced to promise not to marry any one else as long as Mariam is alive. Khosrow succeeds in defeating his enemy and reclaims his throne. Mariam, out of jealousy, keeps Khosrow away from Shirin.

Meanwhile, a sculptor named Farhad falls in love with Shirin and becomes Khosrow's rival in love. Khosrow cannot abide Farhad, so he sends him as an exile to Behistun mountain with the impossible task of carving stairs out of the cliff rocks. Farhad begins his task hoping that Khosrow will allow him to marry Shirin. Yet, Khosrow sends a messenger to Farhad and gives him false news of Shirin's death. Hearing this false news, Farhad throws himself from the mountaintop and dies. Khosrow writes a letter to Shirin, expressing his regret for Farhad's death. Soon after this incident, Mariam also dies. According to Ferdowsi's version, it was Shirin who secretly poisoned Mariam. Shirin replies to Khosrow's letter with another satirical letter of condolences.

Khosrow, before proposing marriage to Shirin, tries to get intimate with another woman named Shekar in Isfahan, which further delays the lovers' union. Finally, Khosrow goes to Shirin's castle to see her. Shirin, seeing that Khosrow is drunk, does not let him into the castle. She particularly reproaches Khosrow for his intimacy with Shekar. Khosrow, sad and rejected, returns to his palace.

Shirin eventually consents to marry Khosrow after several romantic and heroic episodes. Yet, Shiroyeh, Khosrow's son from his wife Mariam, is also in love with Shirin. Shiroyeh finally murders his father and sends a messenger to Shirin conveying that after one week, she would have to marry him. Shirin, in order to avoid marrying Shiroyeh, kills herself. Khosrow and Shirin were buried together in the same grave.

== Popularity in Persian literature ==
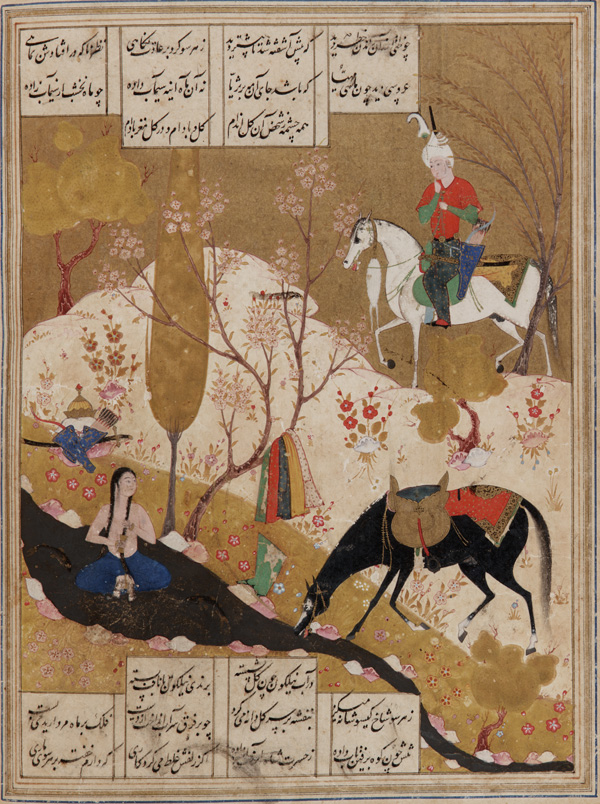
Khosrow Parviz's first sight of Shirin, bathing in a pool, in a manuscript of Nezami's poem. This is a famous moment in Persian literature. Safavid, mid 16th century

There are many references to the legend throughout the poetry of other Persian poets including Farrokhi, Qatran, Mas'ud-e Sa'd-e Salman, Othman Mokhtari, Naser Khusraw, Anwari and Sanai. Nizam al-Mulk mentioned that the legend was a popular story in his era.

=== Nizami's version ===
Although the story was known before Nizami, it was brought to its greatest romantic height by him. Unlike the Shahnameh, which focuses on the history, kingship and battles of Khosrow, Nizami decided to focus on the romantic aspect of the story.

Nizami Ganjavi (1141–1209) himself considered it the sweetest story in the world:

The tale of Khosraw and Shirin is well known
And by Truth, there is no sweeter story than it.

It is believed to be one of the best works of Nizami. His first wife Afaq died after it was completed. Many versions of Nizami's work have been retold. The story has a constant forward drive with exposition, challenge, mystery, crisis, climax, resolution, and finally, catastrophe.

Besides Ferdowsi, Nizami's poem was influenced by Asad Gorgani and his "Vis and Rāmin", which is of the same meter and has similar scenes. Nizami's concern with astrology also has a precedent in the elaborate astrological description of the night sky in Vis and Ramin. Nizami had a paramount influence on the romantic tradition, and Gorgani can be said to have initiated much of the distinctive rhetoric and poetic atmosphere of this tradition, with the absence of the Sufi influences, which are seen in Nizami's epic poetry.

== Influence ==
According to the Encyclopædia Iranica: "The influence of the legend of Farhad is not limited to literature, but permeates the whole of Persian culture, including folklore and the fine arts. Farhad's helve supposedly grew into a tree with medicinal qualities, and there are popular laments for Farhad, especially among the Kurds (Mokri)."

In 2011, the Iranian government's censors refused permission for a publishing house to reprint the centuries-old classic poem that had been a much-loved component of Persian literature for 831 years. While the Iranian Ministry of Culture and Islamic Guidance offered no immediate official explanation for refusing to permit the firm to publish their eighth edition of the classic, the Islamic government's concerns reportedly centered on the "indecent" act of the heroine, Shirin, in embracing her husband.

Orhan Pamuk's novel My Name Is Red (1998) has a plot line between two characters, Shekure and Black, which echoes the Khosrow and Shirin story, which is also retold in the book. The novel uses the Turkish spelling of Khosrow's name, Hüsrev.

== Other versions ==
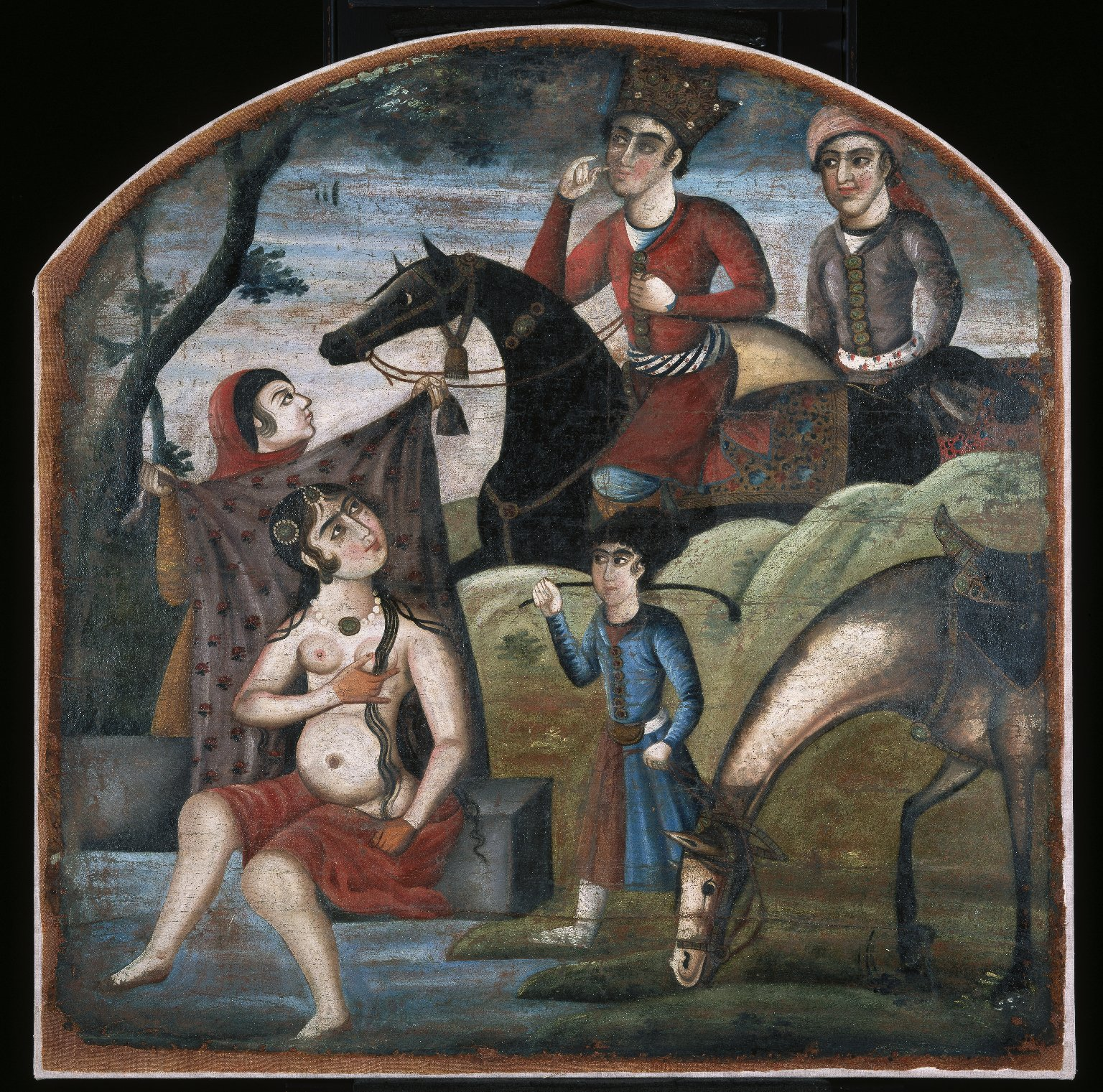
Khosraw Discovers Shirin Bathing, From Pictorial Cycle of Eight Poetic Subjects, mid 18th century. Brooklyn Museum

The tale has been retold by countless Sufi poets and writers in areas which were previously part of the Persian Empire or had Persian influences, such as the northern parts of the neighbouring Indian subcontinent. In Europe, the story was told by Hungarian novelist Mór Jókai. However, the story is usually told under the name of "Shirin Farhad". The story has also become a standard tale in traditional Punjabi Qisse and Bengali Kissa. The story has been filmed numerous times, including: 1926, 1929, 1931, 1934, 1945, 1948, 1956 (starring Madhubala and Pradeep Kumar), 1970, 1975 and 1978.

The tale was used as the inspiration for a 2008 Iranian film, Shirin, made by Abbas Kiarostami. In this formally unusual film, the story is told via the reactions of an audience of Iranian women as they sit watching the film in a cinema. The viewer has to divine the story by only ever seeing these emoting faces and listening to the film's soundtrack.

The story was also referenced in the Jonathan Richman and the Modern Lovers song "Shirin & Fahrad".

The tale was also an inspiration for the 2012 Bollywood romantic comedy film, Shirin Farhad Ki Toh Nikal Padi.

== Illustrations ==
Depictions of Khosrow and Shirin take many different forms, with many depictions coming from adapted versions of Nizami's story that have achieved great popularity. These other illustrations are influenced by European styles of art and the variations in text to picture interpretations are reflections of previous artistic deviations from Nizami's story.

=== Illustrated Adaptations ===
The story was especially popular at the Ottoman court during the reign of Bayezid II. There were five illustrated copies produced by the artist Şeyhi titled Hüsrev ve Şirin, one of which was produced in 1498 CE. Nizami's illustrations for Khosrow and Shirin were likely the inspiration for these copies as Şeyhi's plot was closely related to Nizami's.

Another illustrated copy is a poem by Hatifi with illustrations by Sūzī. Although Hatifi's plot does not closely follow Nizami's or Şeyhi's, the illustrations are typical of Nizami's story. Sūzī's depictions showcase a mixture of Persian and Ottoman artistic style. It is one of the few manuscripts that researchers are confident was made during Bayezid II's reign (1481–1512).

An adaptation that also gained widespread popularity is the Khamsa of Amir Khusrau Dihlavi. Dihlavi composed his Khamsa around the 13th to 14th century. The Khamsa follows the plot of Nizami's story, but deviates from the original in some parts.

=== Hatifi's Poem and Ottoman influence ===
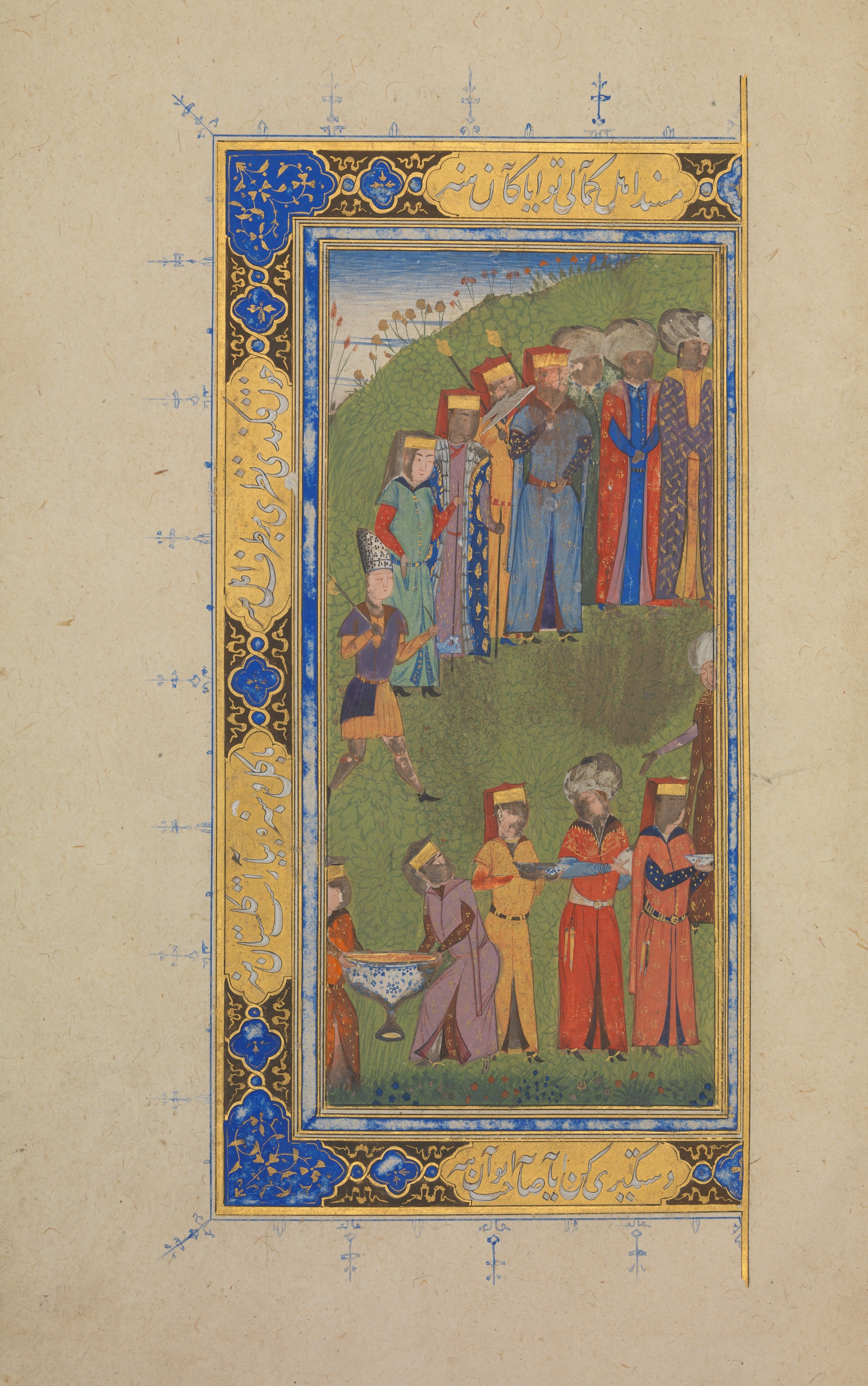
Fig.1. Kusraw and Shirin frontispiece by Suzi. 1498–99, Islamic Art at the Met

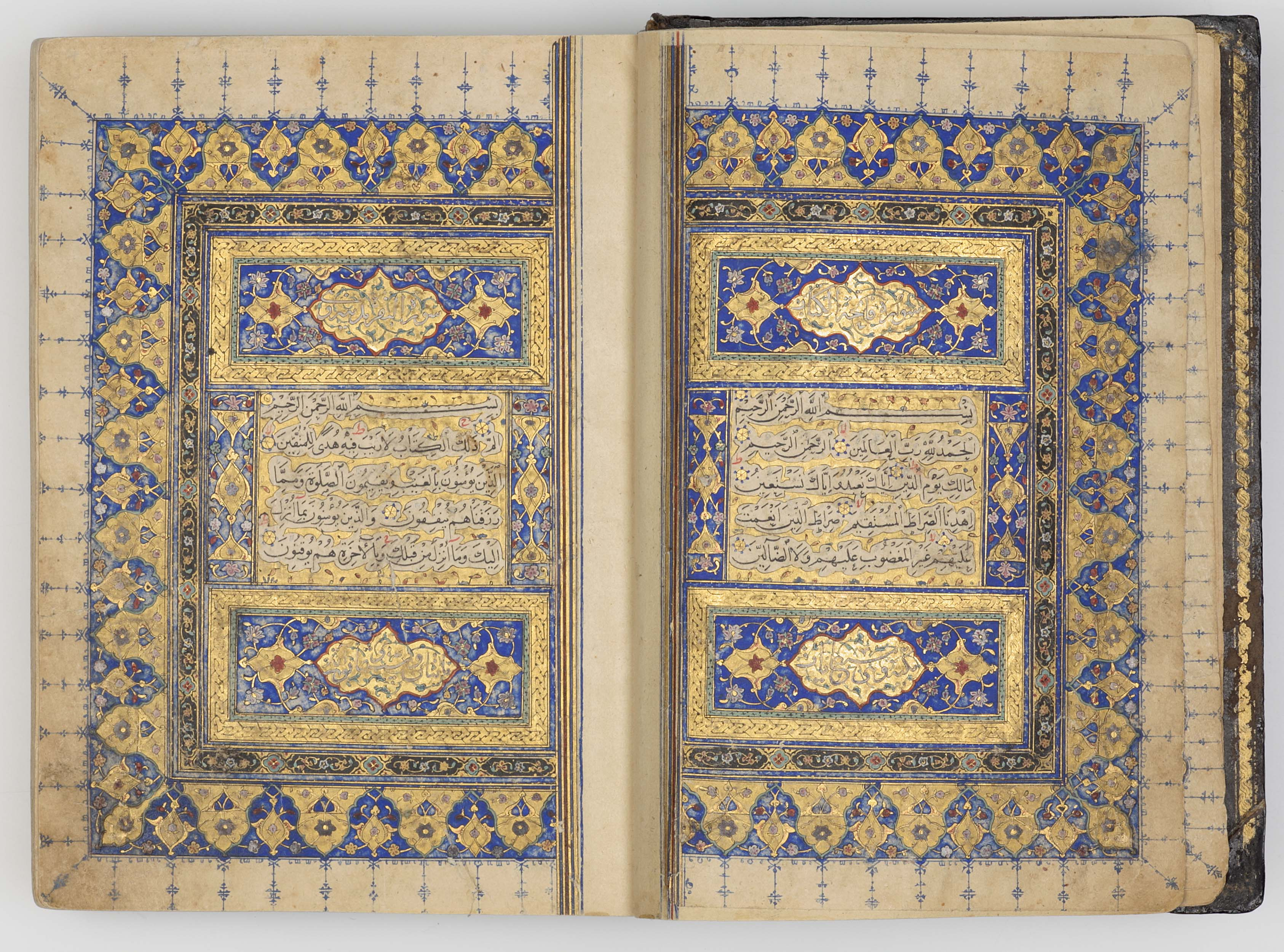
Single-volume Qur'an. 1480-1500. The Khalili Collections

Hatifi's poem takes inspiration from Nazimi's story, but with some new scenes added in and some other scenes cut out. The illustrated copy of Hatifi's poem dates from the reign of the Ottoman sultan Bayezid II, a celebrated patron of the arts. There are a total of 6 miniatures in the manuscript. The colophon indicates that the author, who went by the pseudonym Sūzī, meaning "burning one", copied the entire text as well as painted the illustrations by themselves.

Early Ottoman artistic influence is visible in the illustrated miniatures. The manuscript starts with a double frontispiece that resembles the first pages in luxury Qur'ans produced at the time, albeit less elaborate (figure 1). Within the bands, there are 8 medallions, each of which contains a verse from the text. Between each gold medallion are clouds, which were typical of the Ottoman artistic style of the period.

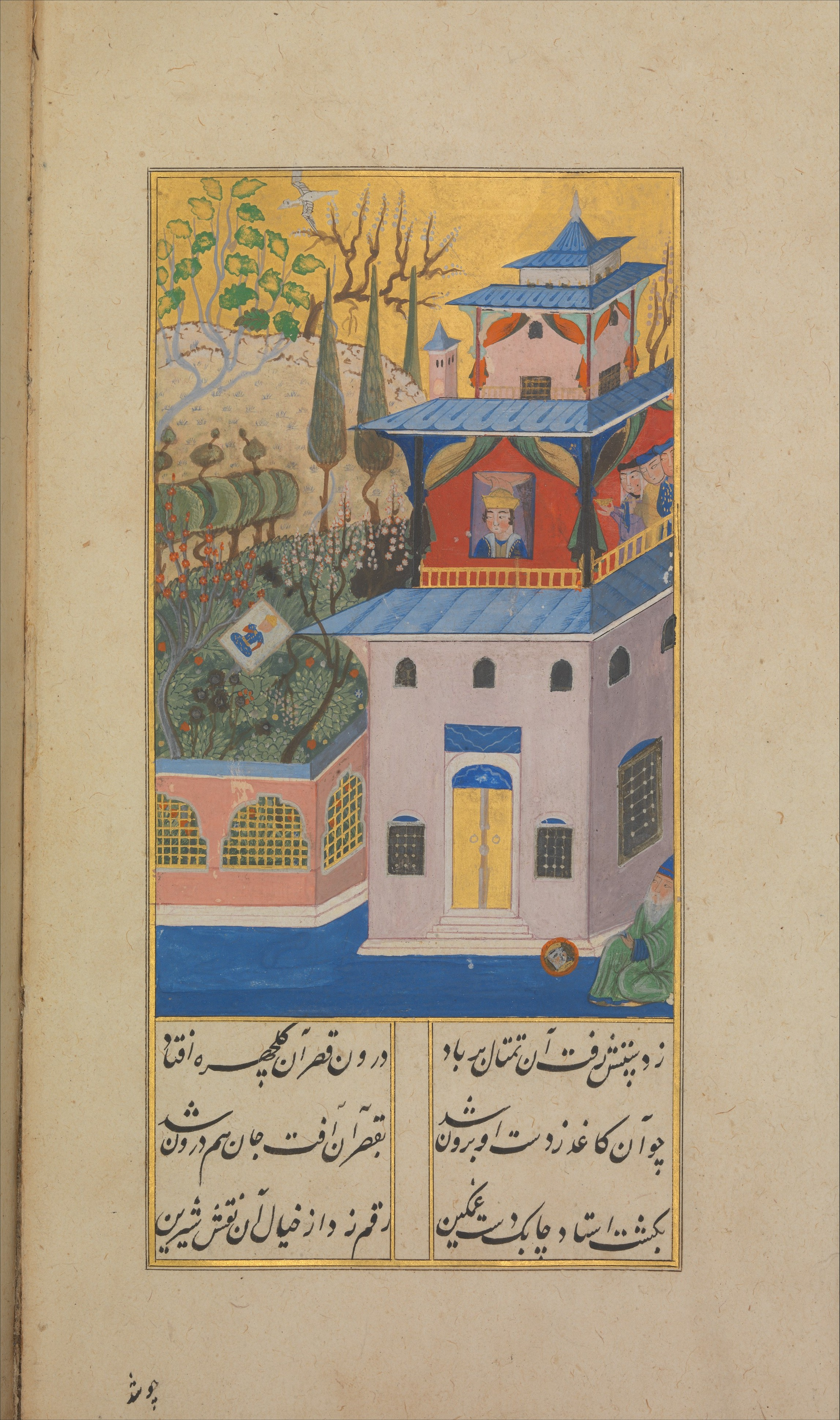
Fig.2 .Shirin looks at Khusraw's image by Suzi. 1498–99. Islamic Art at the Met

Ottoman court influences are further seen in the depiction of Shīrīn viewing Khosrow's picture from her room (figure 2). The balconies and curved, leaded roofs of the palace building exemplify the Ottoman architectural style, as do the arched openings and iron grilles on the garden walls. Furthermore, although not consistent throughout all the miniatures, this scene has demonstrations of perspective and shadowing. The right wall and roof of the palace is slightly darker than that of the left side wall, implying that light must be coming from the left side of the painting. This incorporation of realism is distinctly Ottoman, with Persian art styles typically foregrounding idealism and romanticism.

=== Amir Khusrau Dihlavi's Khamsa ===
Dihlavi's Khamsa was produced in Iran in the year 1599 CE. Mu'izz al-Din Husayn Langari was the scribe that copied the manuscript. After the 16th century, it was widely copied and illustrated in Iran and India. One scene that was illustrated differently in Persia and India was that of Shirin visiting Farhad at work.

In the Persian depiction of Dihlavi's manuscript, Farhad wants Shirin to visit him but is simultaneously tormented by her visits due to his love for her. In the illustration, Farhad crouches on the left side of the illustration while Shirin is placed on the right side, riding in on her famous black horse. She dons a headdress and an orange coat over her blue gown.

In the Mughal illustration, Shirin rides in on her black horse from the left side of the illustration while Farhad stands on the right side. Although different in structure, slight details remain the same between the Persian and Mughal illustrations. For example, the outfit Shirin wears in the Persian illustration, headdress, orange robe, and blue gown, is also present in the Mughal illustration. However, it is not Shirin that dons this outfit, but rather her attendant that does. The similarity in details between the Mughal and Persian copies gives insight into the kind of access that the Mughal painters had to the Persian illustration. Such specific details regarding Shirin's outfit could not have been passed between artists via verbal communication. Thus, it is possible that the Mughal artists were able to view the Persian illustrations in a library before starting their own adaptations.

One scene that deviates from Nizami's story is that of Khusrau giving false news to Farhad. Khusrau hears of Farhad's love for Shirin and devises a plan to tell him that Shirin is dead. In both versions, this message causes Farhad to commit suicide. In Nizami's version, Khusrau already knows Farhad's intentions and sends the messenger with the false news. However, in Dihlavi's version, Khusrau is unsure of Farhad's love and visits him while disguised as a shepherd. Only after the visit does Khusrau send the false news of Shirin's death. In the illustration of this scene, there are similarities between the Persian illustration of Dihlavi's version and Nizami's illustrations. Dihlavi's illustration shows Khusrau dressed in a bonnet and with a walking stick. The structure of this scene is very comparable to Nizami's. Khusrau is in such a similar outfit and position as that of the messenger in Nizami's illustration that one could mistake him for a messenger.

=== Variations In Common Scenes Illustrated ===
==== Illustrations of Shirin Bathing ====
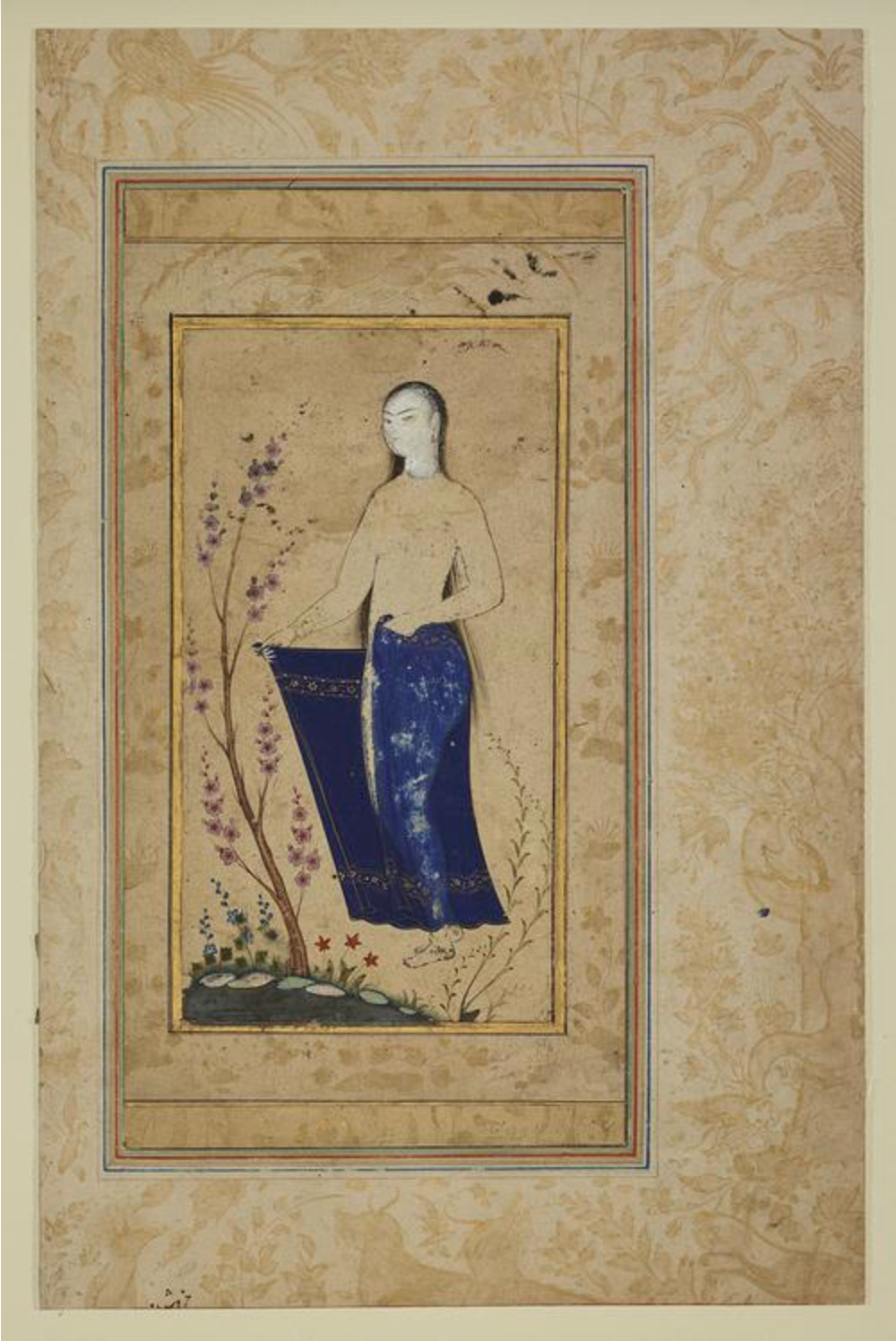
Figure 5.Shirin Before her Bath by Kamal. Medium: watercolor, ink, gold on paper. Date: 1580–90. Collection: The Aga Khan Museum

There are a few common scenes from the epic love story that are chosen by artists to illustrate over and over. One particular scene is that of Khosrow stumbling upon Shīrīn bathing. The variations in depictions of the same scene demonstrate influences of other art styles and stylistic choices of each illustrator. The type of body of water Shīrīn bathes varies across different artists. In Nizami's text, Khosrow accidentally sees Shīrīn bathing when he rides by a pool of water in disguise. Shīrīn is alone aside from her famous black horse.

One depiction of the scene hangs in the Seattle Art Museum and is titled Khusraw Discovers Shirin Bathing in a Pool. The painting comes from calligrapher Murshid al-Shirazi from the mid-16th century (figure 3). Staying faithful to Nizami's text, her horse is black and she is unaccompanied. In this depiction, Khusraw has a hand up to his mouth to showcase his awe of Shīrīn's beauty. Although now tarnished to a dull grayish black, the water was originally a bright silver color. There is a sense of intimacy in this scene due to the languid way Shīrīn's clothes hang from the tree branch. The materials used, watercolor, ink, gold, and paper, were typical of Persian illustrations. In this version, Murshid al-Shirazi decided to place Shīrīn in a river.

A second illustration, titled Khusrau Catches Sight of Shirin Bathing, by Shaikh Zada is from 1524 CE (figure 4). Made in present-day Afghanistan, its materials include watercolor, ink, and gold on paper. Shīrīn is alone aside from her horse while Khusrau has his hand raised to his mouth. Her clothes are left hanging on a tree branch. Art historian, Abolala Soudavar, believes that Khusrau is actually a portrait of Hosayn Khān, the patron of the manuscript for which this illustration was produced. In this illustration, Shīrīn is shown bathing in a stream rather than a river.

A third depiction, titled Shirin Before Her Bath, comes from an artist named Kamal from 1580 CE. It centralizes Shīrīn by not including Khosrow at all (figure 5). This stylistic choice reflected the common practice in the late 16th and 17th century to show Shīrīn alone. Its materials are similar to Murshid al-Shirazi's illustration and include watercolor, ink, and gold on paper. In this illustration, Shīrīn is preparing for a bath at a pond rather than a stream or river.

A fourth painting of the scene, titled Khusraw Discovers Shirin Bathing, comes from an unknown artist from the 18th century. Khosrow is in his princely attire, rather than in disguise, and Shīrīn's horse is silver and brown, instead of black (figure 6) . These deviations from Nizami's text are all perpetuations of previous miniatures. However, the painter of this miniature decided to add three extra people to the scene, disrupting the intimacy between the two lovers in the text. Although the lack of perspective in the illustration is a sign of Persian miniature art style, the muted colors, use of chiaroscuro, and materials (oil on canvas) all show the influence of European artistry. In this illustration, the painter decided to portray Shīrīn bathing in a pond.

==== Illustrations of Shirin visiting Farhad ====
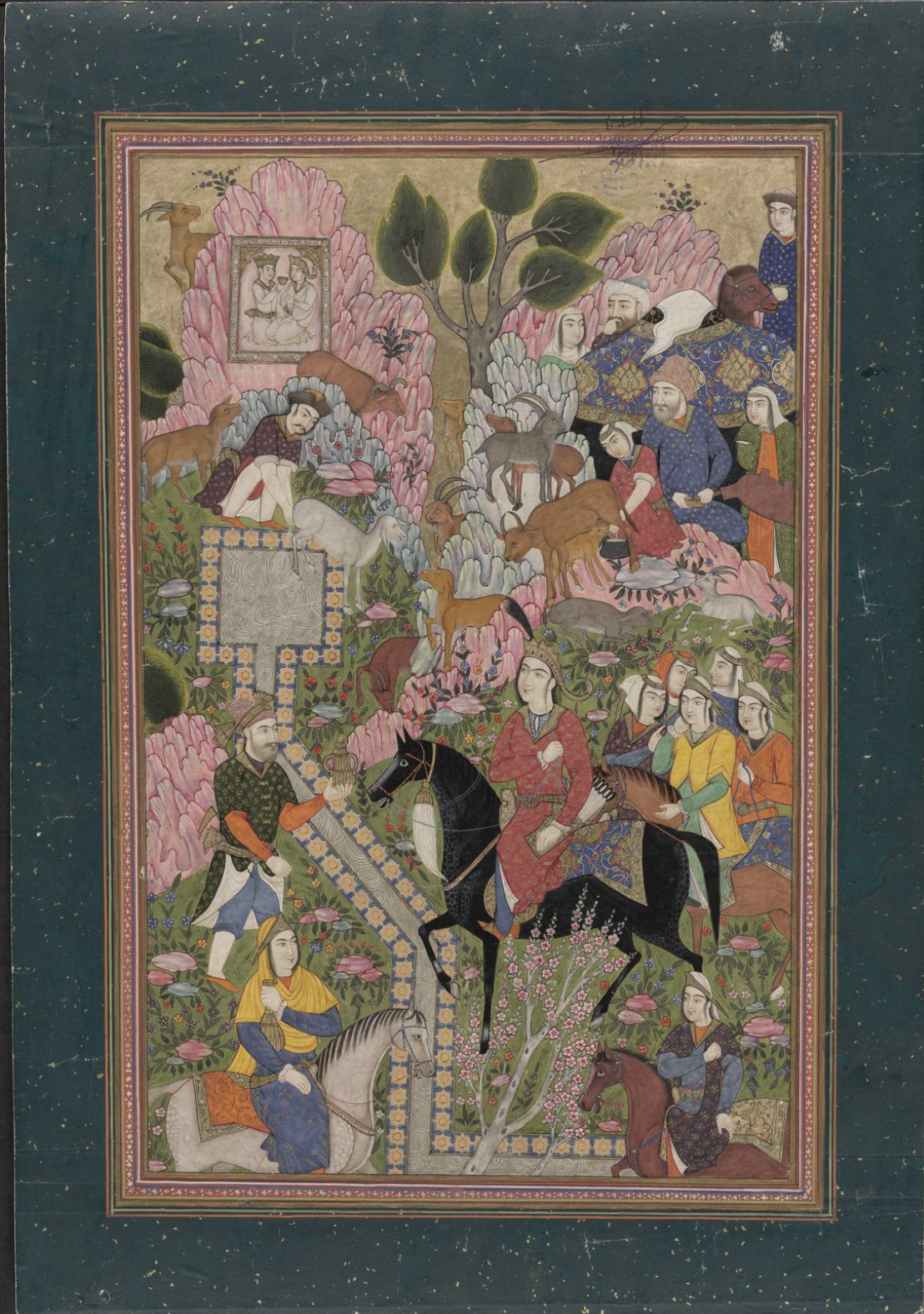
Figure 7.Shirin Visiting Farhad/ Lewis P 265. Date: Early 20th Century. Collection: Free Library of Philadelphia

Another scene that is commonly illustrated is that of Shirin visiting Farhad in the mountains. As mentioned above, the scenes from Nizami and Dihlavi's stories were widely illustrated. One such illustration is located in the Princeton University Special Collections. This illustration is part of a manuscript by Dihlavi from 1524. In this version the color palette is dull and almost monochrome aside from a few colorful patches. Shirin rides visits Farhad on a black horse and wears a white headdress. The milker (Farhad was creating a channel of milk to Shirin's palace) wears a turban. Shirin is depicted with lush hair and a round face. She seems to be staring right at Farhad.

A depiction of the same scene, from the rare books department of the Free Library of Philadelphia, has the same overall structure as that of the Princeton illustration (figure 7). This illustration is from the early 1900s and was an imitation of a Safavid painting. However, there are differences in color and dress. The use of color in this illustration is bountiful and not at all monochromatic. Shirin rides in on a dappled horse and instead of a headdress, she wears a golden crown. The milker, who is also present in this illustration, wears a cap instead of a turban. Shirin is depicted slightly slimmer in this version and seems to be looking above Farhad, rather than right at him.

An illustration of a similar scene is from a manuscript of Nizami's story. Titled Shirin Visits Farhad at Mount Bisutun, it was created in 1527 in Iran. Its materials include the typical Persian tools of watercolor, gold, ink, and paper. The scene depicts the moment before Khusrau delivers the false news of Shirin's death to Farhad. Shirin is astride a black horse and hands Farhad a jug of milk.

== See also ==
- Persian literature
- Persian mythology
