= Shah Mohammad =

Punjabi poet (1780–1862)

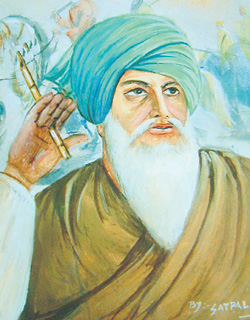
- Born: 1780; Wadala Viram, Amritsar, Bhangi Misl (present-day Punjab, India)
- Died: 1862 (aged 81–82); Amritsar, Punjab, British India (present-day Punjab, India)
- Occupation: Poet
- Writing career
- Notable work: Jangnama (Book of War) about the First Anglo-Sikh War
- Literary movement: First Anglo-Sikh War

Shah Mohammad (Punjabi: شاہ محمّد (Shahmukhi); ਸ਼ਾਹ ਮੁਹੰਮਦ (Gurmukhi); 1780–1862), was a Punjabi poet who lived during the reign of Maharaja Ranjit Singh (1801 – 1839) and is best known for his book Jangnama (Book of War) written around 1846, which depicts the First Anglo-Sikh War (1845 – 1846) that took place after the death of Maharaja Ranjit Singh in 1839.

Shah Muhammad was a Muslim poet of the united India. He was born in Amritsar and his father was Abdul Qureshi.His notable work was the "Sikhan di war" which is a descriptive account of the first Anglo-Sikh War.He wrote this Magnus opus on the request of his friends "Hira Khan" and "Noor Khan". His other notable works include: 1)dowry (2)Qissa Sassi Punu (3)Ghazal (4) Naat It is widely believed by historians that Shah Mohammad had gathered his book material from many eye-witness accounts of his relatives employed in Maharaja Ranjit Singh's army which is how he could piece together a complete picture of the battle between the Punjabis and the British. Therefore, Shah Mohammad's book explains reasons for the fall of Sikh rule in the Punjab.
