= Yusuf-Zulekha =

Story by Shah Muhammad Sagir

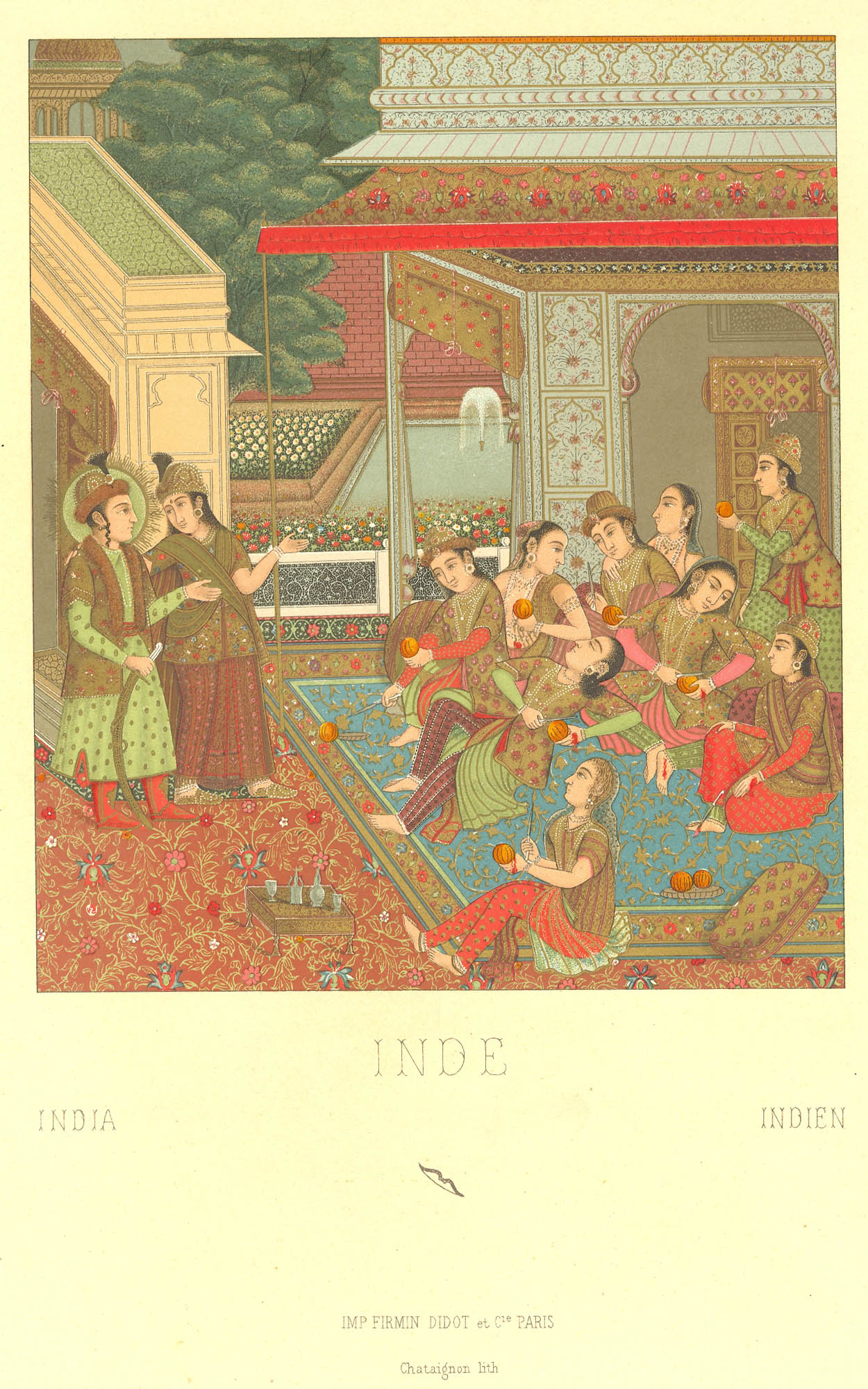
A miniature Mughal painting depicting the tale of Yusuf and Zulaikha

Yusuf-Zulekha (Bengali: ইউসুফ-জুলেখা) is a 15th-century Bengali romantic story in verse written by Shah Muhammad Sagir, which is considered one of the greatest literary works of medieval "golden era" of Bengali literature; when Sagir was a court-poet of the Sultan of Bengal, Ghiyasuddin Azam Shah. Sagir wrote the story at the request of the Sultan.
