= Farina Mir =

- Occupation(s): Professor, Historian
- Known for: History of the Punjab, British colonialism
- Notable work: The Social Space of Language; Punjab Reconsidered; Genre and Devotion in Punjab's Popular Narratives

Farina Mir is a historian and a professor at the University of Michigan. She has a keen interest in the history of colonial and postcolonial South Asia, with a particular interest in the social, cultural, and religious history of late-colonial north India.

== Education ==
In 1993, Mir received her B.A. in English literature and Asian & Middle Eastern Cultures from Barnard College and in 2002, she received her Ph.D. in History with distinction from Columbia University.

== Notable works ==
- Farina Mir, The Social Space of Language: Vernacular Culture in British Colonial Punjab, University of California Press, Wikidata Q60813396
- Punjab Reconsidered: History, Culture, and Practice, ed. Anshu Malhotra and Farina Mir. (New Delhi: Oxford University Press, 2012).
- Genre and Devotion in Punjab's Popular Narratives: Rethinking Cultural and Religious Syncretism," Comparative Studies in Society and History 48.3, July, 2006: 727–758.

== Awards ==
- John F. Richard Prize in South Asian History from the American Historical Association (2011)
- Bernard Cohn Prize from the Association of Asian Studies (2012)
