= Punjabi Qisse =

Story-telling tradition in South Asia

Punjabi Qisse

A collection of Punjabi Qisse in Shahmukhi

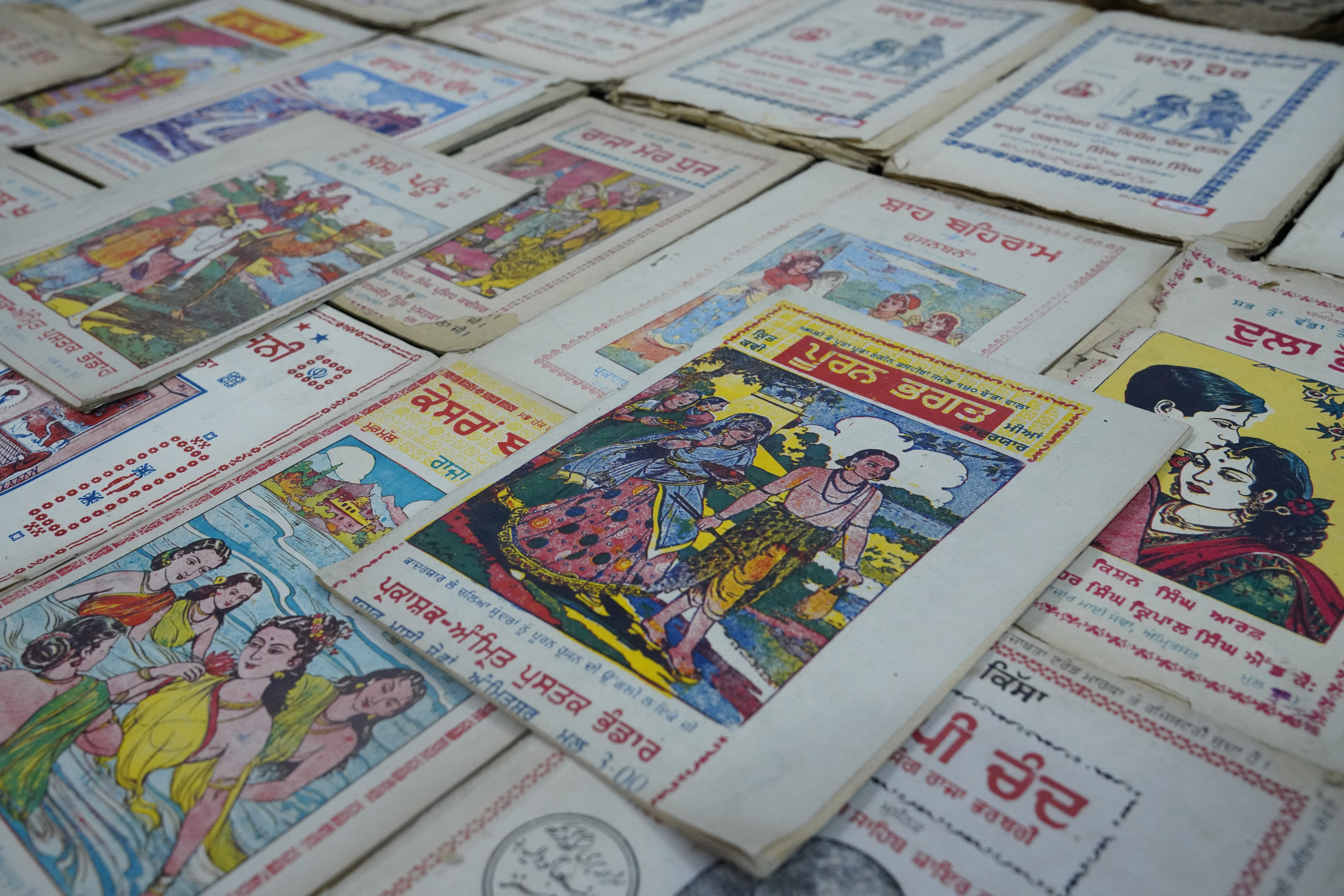
A collection of Punjabi Qisse in Gurmukhi

A Punjabi Qissa (plural: Qisse) is a tradition of Punjabi language oral story-telling that emerged in Punjab region of eastern Pakistan and northwestern India, with the fusion of local Punjabi people and migrants from the Arabian peninsula and contemporary Iran. They are love-ballads based upon the common theme of love between a man and a woman, with influence from Sufi doctrines.

Where Qisse reflect an Islamic and/or Persian heritage of transmitting popular tales of love, valour, honour and moral integrity amongst Muslims, they matured out of the bounds of religion into a more secular form when they reached India and added the existing pre-Islamic Punjabi culture and folklore to its entity.

== Etymology ==
The word Qissa (pronounced Punjabi pronunciation: [kɪssɑː]) is an Arabic word meaning "epic legend" or a "folk tale". It occurs as a regular common noun in Indo-Aryan languages like Punjabi, Bengali, Gujarati, Urdu and Hindi. If used informally, the word means an ‘interesting tale’ or ‘fable’.

== History ==
According to Christopher Shackle, the Punjabi qissa genre of literature developed initially under the Muslim Sufi poets, such as Waris Shah and Hashim Shah, while Sikh writers came later. The Punjabi qissa genre arose due to the influence of Sufi poetry and is a fundamental aspect of Punjabiyat ("Punjabi-ness"). The qissa tradition of Punjab was not the only literary genre of this type in India and the Islamic word, with there also existing the masnavi in Persian literature and the premakhyana in Braj literature. While the Sufi works were lyrical-based, the qissas became narrative-based, with them being accompanied by musical tunes. Each qissa had a particular musical tune associated with it that was chosen by the poet, such as the qissas of Mirza Sahiban, Heer Ranjha, and Sohni Mahiwal. Particular tunes would become associated with a certain story where it was employed. Most of the qissas involve romance between men and women, as this kind of love was viewed as a primitive form of spiritual love between mankind and the divine. Gurus and sants were seen as symbolizing the love involving jivatma and paramatma, which the genre likens to the romantic love a man and woman share for one another. Farid put forth the idea that from birth, mankind is wedded to God, a type of "bridal mysticism". This viewpoint is what kicked-off the desire by authors to produce a qissa, involving spiritual and sensual love together, sourcing their stories from the corpus of Punjab's indigenous folk-tales, but also stories from Persian, Arabic, Sanskrit, and Pali literature. The authors of the qissas used three types of metres: doha, baint, and dawayya, which was also used by the Sufis.

The stories all involve the main hero being a homeless character, who had either migrated away from their ancestral home or been kicked-out. According to Harbhajan Singh, the homelessness motif was due to the demographic situation in the contemporary Punjabi society at the time, where many foreigners had settled in and intermingled with the indigenous population. The youth advocated for an intermingling of culture and blood, while the elders opposed such an affair, leading to a conflict. It may be possible that the qissas about Heer, Sohni, and Sassi may be about actual historical events that occurred, where there was a widespread unconscious acceptance of the dynamics involved but society still disciplined such occurrences, a dynamic of the conflict between desire/personal freedom and societal/social pressure, which makes the Punjabi qissas differ from other traditions outside of Punjab, particularly the premakhyans, which lack this motif. Rather than being purely love stories, all the Punjabi qissas fundamentally are about spiritual love, as the Sufis taught the idea that love was the basis for creation and the heterodoxical idea that worldly love led one to divine love. In-fact, many of the main characters in the qissas become part of religious traditions, such as the fakirs, jogis, even a prophet, or they adopt their garbs and practices, especially mendicants. Therefore, the qissas were able to become accepted in Punjabi society at-large despite social sanction.

The ending of the plot of qissas is open-ended despite being romantic stories, so they lack a hypothetical final plot with a marriage between the lovers. This is an allusion to the Sufi belief that no matter how much a person may love God, even at the highest possible level, they can never possess God. Rather, they can only become one with God, known as wahadatul wajud, a type of non-dualism or existential-monism, destroying any sense of individualism in the process. That is why in the qissa tales, the characters both meet their end and end up destroyed. They find spiritual intimacy by rising above their physical confines. Thus, to truly comprehend the message of the qisse, one needs to consider the underlying spiritual message being told. Thus, the qisse and the Sufi kafis are comparable to one another.

During the colonial period between c. 1870–1914, Sikh publishers printed qissas,

== Qisse and the Punjabi culture ==
The Punjabi language has a rich literature of qisse, most of which are about love, passion, betrayal, sacrifice, social values and a common man's revolt against a larger system. In the Punjabi tradition, friendship, loyalty, love and qaul (verbal agreement or promise) are given utmost importance and most of the stories in the qisse hinge on these critical elements.

Qisse are attributed to have inspired folk music in Punjabi and have added depth and richness to its delivery. These traditions were passed down generations in oral or written forms and were often recited, told as bedtime stories to children or performed musically as folk songs.

Each qissa, if performed, has its unique requirements. A person able to sing or recite one may not necessarily transmit another. The vocal ranges of the musical scale and accurate pauses, if not performed well, leave a performer breathless and unable to continue. Most of the beats used in modern Punjabi music (often misleadingly labelled Bhangra), originated from qissa tradition and recitations in old times. Qisse also boast to be among the best poetry every written in Punjabi.

== Poetry based on Qisse ==
Waris Shah's (1722–1798) qissa of ‘Heer Ranjha’ (formally known as Qissa ‘Heer’) is among the most famous Qisse of all times. The effect of Qisse on Punjabi culture is so strong that even religious leaders and revolutionaries like Guru Gobind Singh and Baba Farid, etc., quoted famous Qissas in their messages. It will not be wrong to say that popularity and nearly divine status of Qisse in Punjabi actually inspired many generations of spiritual leaders and social activists to combine the message of God with teenage love tales. This gave rise to what is known as the Sufi movement in Punjab region.

The most popular writer/poet to have written Punjabi Sufi Qisse was Bulleh Shah (c.1680-1758). So popular are his Kalams (poems) that he is frequently quoted by young and old alike with same respect and on matters of both love and God. In recent times, South Asian singers have sported these folklores on their albums, for instance, the most famous folklore duo like Kuldeep Manak and Dev Tharike Wala wrote and sang about almost every Qissa, and recently, Rabbi by (Rabbi Shergill) contained ‘Bulla Ki Jaana Main Kaun’, translated in English as ‘I know not who I am’, written by Bulleh Shah. A few years back another singer, (Harbhajan Maan), a Canada-based Punjabi singer rejuvenated the story of ‘Mirza Sahiban’, a work by Peelu. Daim iqbal Daim from Mandi Bahauddin District, Pakistan also wrote many qissas in Punjabi language like Laila Majnu, Mirza Sahiban, Sohni Mahiwal, Bilal Biti, etc. Daim got popularity by writing "Shah Nama Karbla" and "Kambal Posh".

== Notable Qisse ==
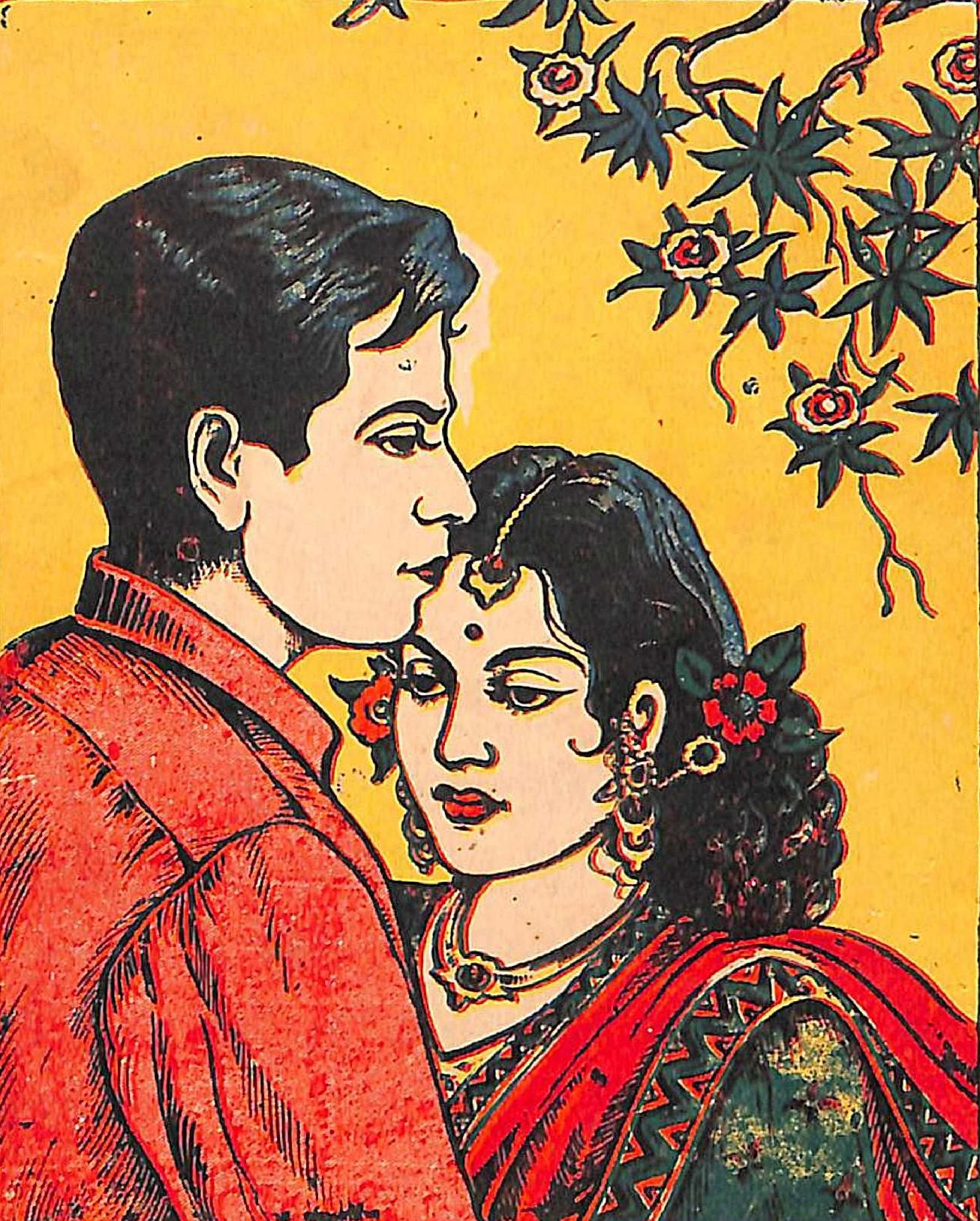
Cover image of Qissa Dulla Bhatti by Kavi Kishan Singh Arif

Most of the Punjabi qisse were written by Muslim poets who wandered the land. The oldest were usually scripted in the Shahmukhi script. Some of the most popular qisse are listed below:

- ‘Mirza Sahiban’ by Peelu
- ‘Heer Ranjha’ by Waris Shah
- ‘Sassi Punnun’ by Hashim Shah
- ‘Pooran Bhagat’ by Qadir Yar
- ‘Shirin Farhad’ by Hashim Shah
- ‘Sohni Mahiwal’ by Fazal Shah Sayyad
- ‘Laila Majnu’ by Fazal Shah Sayyad
- ‘Dhol Sammi’
- ‘Dulla Bhatti’
- ‘Kaulan’
- ‘Yusuf and Zulaikha’ by Hafiz Barkhurdar
- ‘Saif al-Mulūk and Badīʿ al-Jamāl’ by Mian Muhammad Bakhsh

== Gallery ==
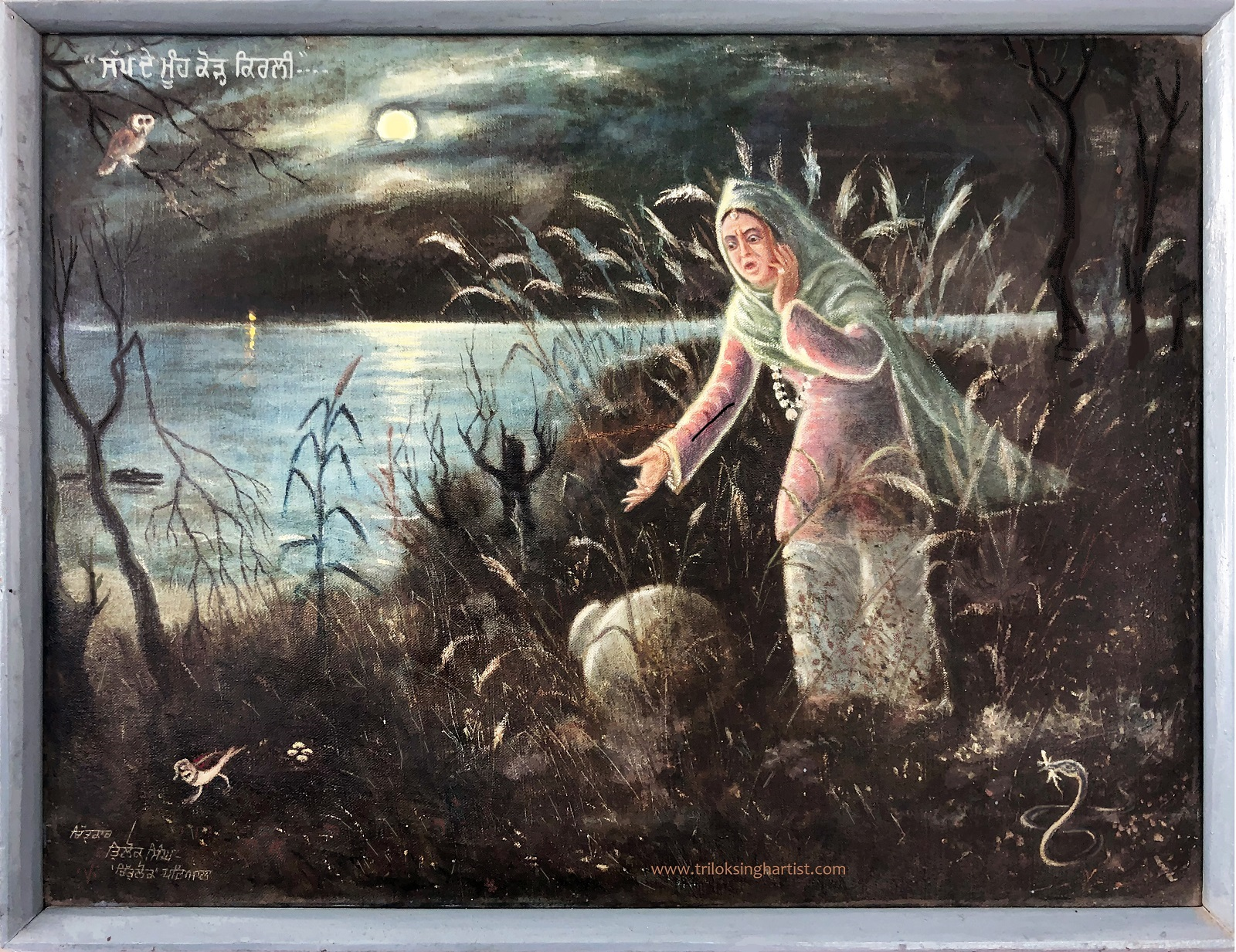
Sohni Mahiwal

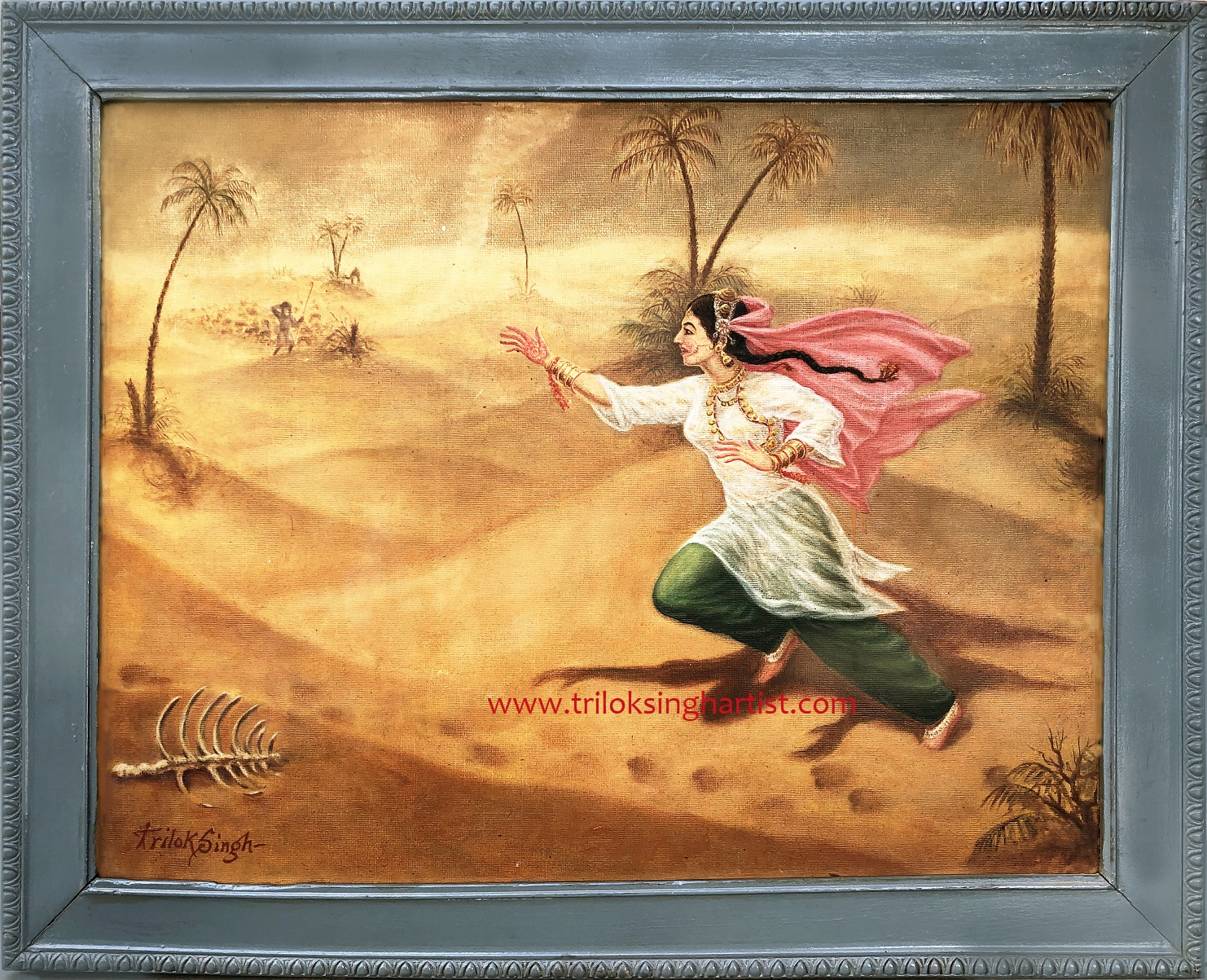
Sassi Punnun

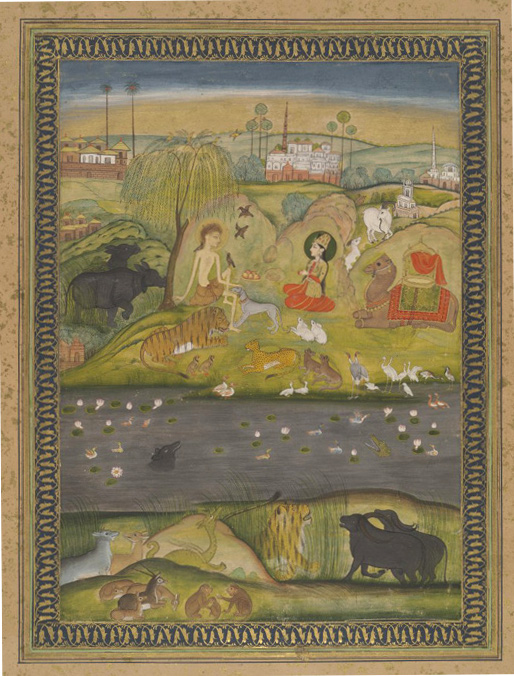
Layla visits Majnun in the wilderness

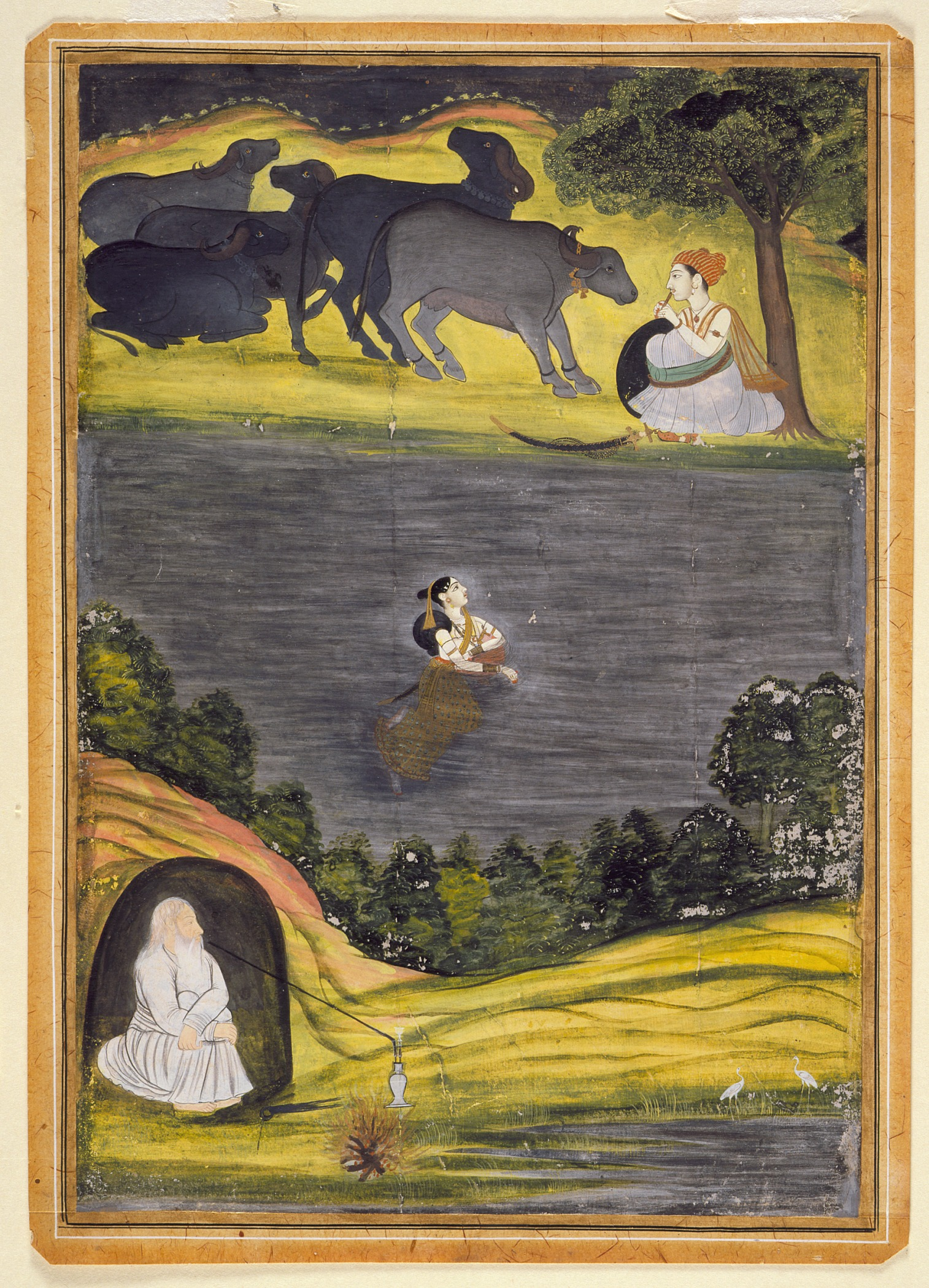
Sohni swims to meet her lover Mahiwal

== See also ==
- Punjabi literature
- Punjabi folklore
- Vaar
- Bengali Kissa
