= Dawlat Wazir Bahram Khan =

- Born: Asaduddin; Chittagong, modern-day Bangladesh
- Other name: Daulat Ujir
- Occupation: Writer
- Notable work: Laily-Majnu, Imam Bijoy

Dawlat Wazir Bahram Khan (Bengali: দৌলত উজির বাহরাম খান, romanized: Doulot Uzir Bahram Khan), born as Asaduddin, was a 16th-century medieval Bengali poet and the Wazir of Chittagong in southeastern Bengal.

He is best known for his magnum opus Laily-Majnu which is a thematic Bengali adaptation of Jami's version of the classic tale. Among his other notable works are long poems such as Imam Bijoy which was a retelling of the 7th-century Battle of Karbala that had taken place in Iraq.

== Career ==
Laily-Majnu excerpt (p. 93)

বালেমু সুবদনী
Balemu shubdoni
দোহঁ মিলি নিরজনি
Doho mili nirojoni
খেলত রঙ্গে ধামাল।
Khelto ronge dhamal

— Bahram Khan

Asaduddin was born into a wealthy Bengali Muslim family in the city of Chittagong. It is thought that he was either from the neighbourhood of Jafrabad or Fatehabad. His father, Mubarak Khan, was the Vizier of the city's governor Nizam Sur. His ancestor, Hamid Khan, was a minister for the Sultan of Bengal Alauddin Husain Shah (r. 1494-1519) and was granted two parganas in Chittagong where he settled with his family.

After his father's death, Bahram was made the next Vizier of Chittagong by its governor, Nizam Sur, at a young age. It is thought that he wrote Laily-Majnu between 1560 and 1575.

== Legacy ==
Bahram Khan remains one of the most well-known Bengali poets of the medieval era. Currently funded by the Government of Bangladesh, the Bangla Academy is the regulatory body for the research and promotion of the Bengali language. The first book that was published by the academy was Bahram Khan's Laily-Majnu, edited by Ahmed Sharif.
