= List of Bengali poets =

This List of Bengali poets includes poets who write in Bengali language who produce Bengali poetry. This list classifies poets into three groups based on geographical location. These are poets from Bangladesh, poets from West Bengal of India and poets from other parts of the world including Bengali Diaspora and non-Bengali people writing poetry in Bengali. However, the list starts with early Bengali poets to be followed by those who are identified not only with Indian sub-continent before partition in 1947, but also as founders of Bengali poetry. The list also contains separate sub-lists of "rhyme composers" and "song writers". Finally, there are two sub-sets of woman poets and poets in exile.

== Early poets ==
=== Siddhacharyas (6th to 12th CE) ===
The poets of the Charyāpada (Bengali: চর্যাপদ, Corjapod), known as the Siddhacharyas, lived in eastern India and Nepal. Prior to each pada (verse) are mentioned the names of the Siddhacharyas in Sanskrit (or its Tibetan language equivalent), as well as the raga in which the verse was to be sung. The surviving 50 manuscripts contains the name of 24 Siddhacharyas including Lui Pa, Kukkuri Pa, Birua Pa, Gundari Pa, Chatil Pa, Bhusuku Pa, Kanha Pa, Kambalambar Pa, Dombi Pa, Shanti Pa, Mahitta Pa, Bina Pa, Saraha Pa, Shabar Pa, Aryadeb Pa, Dhendhan Pa, Darik Pa, Bhade Pa, Tadak Pa, Kankan Pa, Ja’anandi Pa, Dham Pa, Tanti Pa and Loridombi Pa. Most of these names were pseudonyms as the poets rejected Vedic Hinduism and profess Sahajayana Buddhism. Lui Pa is considered as the earliest poet of Charyapadas. Kanha Pa's 11 surviving poems constitute the largest number among these poets.

The poets and their works as mentioned in the text are as follows:

Poet	Pada (verse)
Luipāda	1,29
Kukkuripāda	2, 20, 48
Virubāpāda	3
Gundaripāda	4
Chatillapāda	5
Bhusukupāda	6, 21, 23, 27, 30, 41, 43, 49
Kānhapāda	7, 9, 10, 11, 12, 13, 18, 19, 24, 36, 40, 42, 45
Kambalāmbarapāda	8
Dombipāda	14
Shantipāda	15, 26
Mahidharapāda	16
Vināpāda	17
Sarahapāda	22, 32, 38, 39
Shabarapāda	28, 50
Āryadevapāda	31
Dhendhanapāda	33
Darikapāda	34
Bhādepāda	35
Tādakapāda	37
Kankanapāda	44
Jayanandipāda	46
Dhāmapāda	47
Tantripāda	25

== Medieval Poets ==
Poet	Pen Name	Era	Work
Ramai Pandit		c. 13th century	Best known for his work named Shunyapurana in Middle Bengali.
Chandidas		c. 14th century	Chandidas was the first humanist in Bengali poetry. He asserted "Shobar upor manush shotto tahar upore nai" ("Above all is humanity, none else").
Nur Qutb Alam		14th century	Nur Qutb Alam wrote poetry in Middle Bengali using the Persian alphabet.
Krittibas Ojha		c. 1381-1461 CE	He first translated Indian epic the Valmiki Ramayana into Bengali. The Bengali version is known as Krittivasi Ramayana.
Shah Muhammad Saghir		c. 14th century	Considered as the earliest Bengali Muslim poet. His best known work is Yusuf-Zulekha.
Maladhar Basu		c. 15th century	Composed a tale titled Sri Krishna Bijay in Bengali.
Zainuddin		c. 15th century	Composed a fictional tale titled Rasul Bijay, the source of which is said to have been a novel in the Persian language.
Vijay Gupta		c. 15th century	Best known for his version of Manasamangal Kavya.
Parameshwar Das	Kavindra (Great Poet)	c. 16th century	He translated the Hindu epic Mahabharata into Bengali language.
Kashiram Das		c. 16th century	He translated the famous Hindu epic Mahabharata into Bengali language. His version of Mahabharata is known as Kashidasi Mahabharata
Afzal Ali		c. 16th century	Best known for his magnum opus, Nasihatnama.
Dawlat Wazir Bahram Khan		c. 16th century	Best known for his magnum opus Laily-Majnu which is a thematic Bengali adaptation of Jami's version of the classic tale.
Syed Sultan		c. 16th century	Best known for his magnum opus, the Nabibangsha, which was one of the first translations of the Qisas Al-Anbiya into the Bengali language.
Chandravati		c. 16th century	Considered as the first known female poet of Bengali language. Best known for her women-centered epic Ramayana.
Khelaram Chakrabarty		c. 16th century	One of the earliest poet of Dharmamangal kavya tradition.
Manik Datta		c. 16th century	Earliest poet of the Chandimangal kavya
Dwija Madhab or Madhabacharya		c. 16th century	One of the most significant contributor to Chandimangal kavya tradition.
Mukundaram Chakrabarti	Kabikankan (Bracelet of Poets)	c. 16th century	His work, known as the Abhayamangal
Daulat Qazi		1600-1638 CE	The first Bengali poet to write under the patronage of the Arakan court during the Mrauk-U dynasty.
Alaol	Pandit Kabi (Pandit of Poets)	1607-1680 CE	Well known work is Padmavati, which depicts the story of Padmavati, the Sinhalese princess.
Abdul Hakim		1620-1690 CE	Most notable work was Nur Nama (Story of Light), a depiction of the life of Muhammad.
Rupram Chakrabarty		c. 17th century	His work, Anadimangal
Muhammad Muqim		c. 18th century	
Rahimunnessa		1763–1800 CE	Notable works of her Bengali translation of the Persian Laily Majnu and the poem Payar Chanda.
Heyat Mahmud		1693–1760 CE	
Akinchan Chakrabarty	Kavindra (Great Poet)	c. 18th century	
Ghanaram Chakrabarty		c. 1669-?	
Ramprasad Sen		c. 1723 – 1775	His bhakti poems, known as Ramprasadi
Aju Gossain		c. 18th century	
Bharatchandra Ray		1712–1760 CE	Mostly known for his poetic work, Annadamangal or Annapurnamangal

== Founders of modern Bengali poetry ==
Poet	Image	Pen Name	Era	Work
Iswarchandra Gupta			1812–1859 CE	Known for satire and revival of medieval style in Bengali poetry.
Michael Madhusudan Dutta			1824–1873 CE	Introduced blank verse in Bengali poetry; author of Meghnad Badh Kavya.
Nabinchandra Sen			1847–1909 CE	Historical epics like Palashir Juddha and Raivatak.
Kazem Ali Quereshi		Kaykobad	1857–1951 CE	Wrote Mahashmashan; noted for Islamic and nationalistic themes.
Girindramohini Dasi			1858–1924 CE	One of the first notable female Bengali poets.
Akshay Kumar Baral			1860–1919 CE	Known for romantic and devotional poetry.
Rabindranath Tagore		Gurudev, Kabiguru, and Biswakabi	1861–1941 CE	Bengali polymath—Poet, Novelist, Playwright, Short-story writer, Music composer, Essayist, Philosopher, Literary critic, Social reformer, Politician, Painter. First non-European to win the Nobel Prize in Literature (1913).
Dwijendralal Ray			1863–1913 CE	Known for patriotic songs and plays like Mewar Patan.
Jatindramohan Bagchi			1878–1948 CE	Lyric poet known for his emotional tone and simplicity.
Satyendranath Dutta			1882–1922 CE	Known as the "wizard of rhyme"; focused on classical themes and metres.
Jatindranath Sengupta			1887–1954 CE	Satirical and humanist poet; part of modernist movement.
Mohitlal Majumdar			1888–1952 CE	Romantic and philosophical poet; literary critic too.
Kazi Nazrul Islam			1899–1976 CE	Bidrohi Kobi; wrote revolutionary poetry like Bidrohi, patriotic and Islamic songs.
Jibanananda Das			1899–1954 CE	Pioneer of modernism; famous for Banalata Sen and Ruposhi Bangla.
Amiya Chakravarty			1901–1986 CE	Poet, scholar, and companion of Tagore; known for philosophical depth.
Sudhindranath Dutta			1901–1960 CE	Modernist poet; known for intellectual and complex verse.
Jasimuddin			1903–1976 CE	Polli Kobi; author of pastoral poems like Nakshi Kanthar Math.
Buddhadeva Bose			1908–1974 CE	Key figure in modern Bengali literature; editor of Kavita.
Bishnu Dey			1909–1982 CE	Modernist and Marxist poet; known for combining art and ideology.
Ahsan Habib			1917–1985 CE	Known for humorous and lyrical poems in post-Tagore era.
Farrukh Ahmad			1918–1974 CE	Islamic and anti-colonial themes; called Saimum Kobi.
Syed Ali Ahsan			1922–2002 CE	Poet, critic, and academic; translated Bengali literature into English.
Sukanta Bhattacharya			1926–1947 CE	Socialist poet; known for poems like Chharpatra written during youth.
Shamsur Rahman			1929–2006 CE	Major modern poet of Bangladesh; explored urban life, politics, love.
Al Mahmud			1936–2019 CE	Blended romanticism and rural life; known for Sonali Kabin.
Abul Hasan			1947–1975 CE	Lyrical and melancholic poetry; noted for early death and deep emotion.
Rudra Mohammad Shahidullah			1956–1991 CE	Revolutionary and romantic poet; known for intense emotional expression.

== Bengali poets from other parts of the world ==
Poet	Image	Pen Name	Era	Work
Abdul Gaffar Choudhury			1934–2022 CE	Best known for writing the lyrics of the famous song "Amar Bhaier Rokte Rangano" during the Bengali Language Movement.
Shamim Azad			1952–present	Bangladeshi-British poet and storyteller. Writes in both Bengali and English, known for fusion of cultural themes.
Taslima Nasrin			1962–present	Renowned for her feminist and secularist writings, often in exile. Author of Lajja and other influential works.
Abid Azad			1952–2005 CE	Poet, literary critic, and editor known for his contributions to modern Bangladeshi poetry.

== Hungryalist poets ==
Poet	Image	Pen Name	Era	Work
Shakti Chattopadhyay			1933–1995 CE	Major poet of the Hungryalist movement; known for Hey prem, hey naishyabda.
Binoy Majumdar			1934–2006 CE	Mathematician-turned-poet; known for Phire esho, Chaka and unique scientific style.
Samir Roychoudhury			1933–2016 CE	Co-founder of the Hungryalist movement; wrote experimental and subversive poetry.
Malay Roy Choudhury			1939–present	Founder of the movement; wrote the manifesto; famous for poem Prachanda Baidyutik Chhutar (Stark Electric Jesus).
Subimal Basak			1940–present	Known for surreal and absurdist poetry and fiction; active participant in the movement.

== Metrical poets ==
Poet	Image	Pen Name	Era	Work
Annada Shankar Ray			1904–2002 CE	Essayist, poet, and satirist; known for rhymed essays and classical poetic style.
Sukumar Ray			1887–1923 CE	Famous for children's rhymed verse like Abol Tabol; pioneer of literary nonsense.
Farrukh Ahmad			1918–1974 CE	Islamic romanticism and metrical structure; known as Saimum Kobi.
Shamsur Rahman			1929–2006 CE	Blended modern free verse with traditional metre; widely influential in Bangladesh.
Motiur Rahman Mollik			1950–2010 CE	Islamic metrical poetry; established Bangladeshi rhymed modern verse.
Abu Zafar Obaidullah			1934–2001 CE	Known for poems like Kono Ek Ma-key; used strong traditional metres.
Rafiqul Haque			1937–2021 CE	Also known as Dadu Bhai; popular for children's poetry in rhymed form.
Fayez Ahmed			Dates unknown	Poet of rhyme and metrical storytelling; known for educational children's poems.
Ekhlasuddin Ahmed			1940–2014 CE	Renowned for rhymed children's literature and humorous poetry.
Abdur Rahman			1918–1981 CE	Known for metrical poetry with spiritual and political themes.
Nirmalendu Goon			1945–present	Popular for simple, lyrical, metrical poems on love and politics.
Asad Chowdhury			1943–present	Known for lyricism, rhyme, and recitation; key modern metrical voice.
Bimal Guha			1952–present	Prominent in post-70s poetry; uses rhythmic techniques with modern themes.
Shahabuddin Nagari			1955–present	Writes in musical metre with romantic and political imagery.

== Song composers ==
Composer	Image	Era	Work
Lalon Shah		1774–1890 CE	Baul mystic-songwriter renowned for the oral tradition of Baul songs.
Rabindranath Tagore		1861–1941 CE	Composed over 2,000 songs (Rabindra Sangeet); influential in modern Bengali music.
Dwijendralal Ray		1863–1913 CE	Known for patriotic and devotional songs like "Krishna Charaire Chand".
Atulprasad Sen		1871–1934 CE	Pioneered Bengali ghazals and folk-inspired love/devotional songs.
Rajanikanta Sen		1865–1910 CE	Famous for melodious devotional and patriotic songs.
Kazi Nazrul Islam		1899–1976 CE	“Rebel poet”; composed hundreds of songs: Nazrul Geeti.
Hason Raja		1854–1922 CE	Mystic folk songwriter from Sylhet; philosophical lyricist.
Kangal Harinath		1833–1896 CE	Revolutionary folk songs and ballads.
Shah Abdul Karim		1916–2009 CE	Bangladeshi Baul singer-songwriter; composed about 160 songs.
Abu Hena Mustafa Kamal		1936–1989 CE	Poet, teacher, lyricist; known for songs like "Shei Champa Nadir Tire".
Shahabuddin Nagari		1955–present	Modern lyricist and composer; writes songs with folk metres.
Motiur Rahman Mollik		1950–2010 CE	Bangladeshi poet-composer; known for Islamic lyrical songs.
Rudra Mohammad Shahidullah		1956–1991 CE	Romantic and modern songs; beloved by young audiences.
Anjan Dutt		1958–present	Bengali singer-songwriter, film director; pioneer of contemporary Bengali pop.
Kabir Suman		1949–present	Introduced modern urban lyricism in Bengali music.
Nachiketa Chakraborty		1964–present	Indian Bengali singer-songwriter; popular in youth culture.
Gobinda Halder		1930–2015 CE	Wrote ~3,500 songs; patriotic hits during 1971 Liberation War.

== Poets of Kolkata ==
Poet	Image	Pen Name	Era	Work
Joy Goswami			1954–present	One of the most prominent contemporary Bengali poets; known for Pagali Tomara Sathe.
Sunil Gangopadhyaya			1934–2012 CE	Versatile poet and novelist; major figure in post-1950s Bengali literature; linked to the Krittibas group.
Shakti Chattopadhyay			1933–1995 CE	Important poet of post-Tagore generation; associated with the Hungry generation.
Ekram Ali			1950s–present	Poet and essayist; writes on identity, marginalization, and language politics.
Subodh Sarkar			1958–present	Contemporary poet and academic; noted for modern urban themes and bold imagery.
Srijato			1975–present	Popular for accessible and youthful poetry; known for works like Uronto Sob Joker.

== Poets of North Bengal ==
Poet	Image	Pen Name	Era	Work
Bikash Sarkar			1965–present	Poet, writer, journalist & editor from Dooars region; recipient of Jugasankha Literary Award (2010); known for collections like Kanisker Matha and Gairkatasamagra.

== Bibliography ==
- Biletey Bishsotoker Bangla Kobi, Rabbani Choudhury, Agamee Prakashani, Dhaka 2000
- Bangladesher Gronthoponji Boimela 2009, Rabbani Choudhury, Agamee Prakashani, Dhaka 2009
- Shanghati Tritio Banglar Lekok Porichithi Boimela 2009, Shanghati Literary Society, UK

== See also ==
- উইকিসংকলন:লেখক
