= Barujibi =

Agrarian caste in India and Bangladesh

Barujibi, Barui
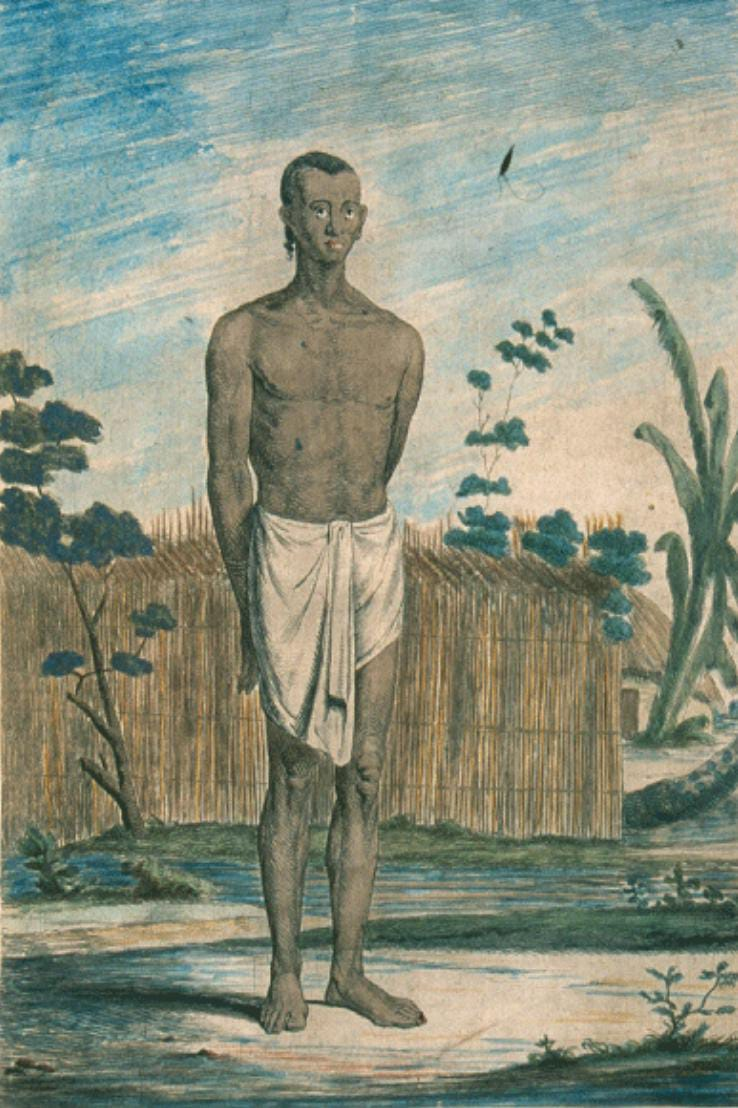
- Barui betel cultivator, from a 1799 collection of etchings
- Kuladevi (female): Lakshmi, Chandi (worshipped as Sungai Devi)
- Religions: Hinduism
- Languages: Bengali
- Populated states: West Bengal, Assam, Bangladesh, Tripura

Barujibi (Bengali: বারুজীবী/বারুজীবি) or Barui (Bengali: বারুই) is a Bengali Hindu agrarian caste found in India and Bangladesh. Their traditional occupation is cultivation of Betel. Barujibi is one of the fourteen castes belonging to 'Nabasakh' group of Bengal. They are listed as Other Backward Class in West Bengal as "Barujibi, Barui" and in the Central List as recommended by Mandal Commission. Although socio-culturally different, this caste is akin in terms of occupation to Barai, Tamboli and Chaurasia caste groups of Uttar Pradesh, Bihar, Maharashtra, Madhya Pradesh and Rajasthan, Tammali in Andhra Pradesh, Bariji in Odisha, Barjubi in Assam.

== Demographics ==
As per the Census of India 1941 (Volume IV Appendix) titled BENGAL CASTE TABLES, the Barujibi caste was listed among the Non-Scheduled Castes with variant names denoting the same caste including Barai, Baraj, Baraji, Barjibi, Baishya-Barenjibi and Lata Baidya. The same table reflected that the British Territory of Bengal had a total of 159,150 Barujibi caste population. The highest number of such residents with a population of 41,016 (25.77%) was found in the then Dacca District with considerable populations in Dinajpur, Jessore, Khulna and Hooghly districts of undivided Bengal among other districts. The lowest population was recorded in Darjeeling district being 54. The presence of this caste was recorded in all the districts of undivided Bengal except Chittagong Hill Tracts.

== Post - Partition of India ==
A huge portion of the population migrated as displaced persons (refugee) to West Bengal till 1971. Purba Bharat Barujibi Sangha was formed in 1951 which was headquartered at Jadavpur, Kolkata which demanded for relief and rehabilitation of the refugees. To provide them relief and rehabilitation the then Refugee Relief and Rehabilitation Department under the Government of West Bengal came up with the Barujibi Scheme under which 1,787 families of the Barujibi caste were provided with 2 Bigha agricultural plots and 8 Cottah residential plots each in rural areas.

== Etymology ==
"Bāru" in Sanskrit stands for Betel and the suffix "-jibi" roots from "Jeevin" meaning livelihood, implying people engaged in the cultivation and trade of Betel leaves. The Tambuli caste, also spelled as Tamboli in the context of Bengali culture is another such caste related to Betel leaves but it mostly deals with the preparation and retail trade of the leaves. It roots from the Sanskrit word Tāmbula for Betel leaves.

== Social stratificational facts ==
The group is considered to be one of the constituent castes of the Nabasākh, from Sanskrit words "Nava" (nine) and "Sākhā" (branch) referring to nine castes which are placed below the Brahmins but are somewhat akin to the Kayasthas with respect to rituals and were in general treated respectably, as per a locus classicus couplet of Parashara. Their respectability is obtained from the fact that Paan leaves (Betel) are an inseparable totem in Hinduism in general and Bengali Hinduism in particular, used in most rites of passage and rituals and is widely consumed. They are mostly adherents of Shaktism with a minority adhering to Vaishnavism. Although many other castes and Muslims also practice betel leaf cultivation but the occupation traditionally remains with the Hindus only. Endogamous sub-castes include Rarhi, Barendra, Nathan and Kota. H.H. Risley has accounted in details the religious and agrarian practices of the Barujibis.

== Origin ==
Pertaining to the creational myth as per the Jātimālā it is stated that this caste originated as a Varna Sankara from a Goala father and a Tanti mother. The Brihaddharma Purana on the other hand states that the caste originated from a Brahmin father and a Shudra mother. Beliefs regarding legendary origins prevalent as oral traditions state that the creator-god Brahma created them for the necessity of Betel leaves. This caste has been mentioned in the medieval Bengali literature marvel of Chandimangal Kavya composed by Mukundaram Chakrabarti.
