= Pholar =

Mixed fruit plater dish

Pholar is an ancient and widely consumed dish in Bangladesh and India. Etymologically, phal (fruit) and ahar (food), or fruit-mixed food, is called phalahar, whose colloquial form is pholar. In common usage, pholar refers to a vegetarian meal that excludes rice.

In pholar, vegetarian items generally include luchi, flattened rice, yogurt, sweets, and fruits. Originally, pholar referred to a fine variety of flattened rice and murki, served with yogurt, sugar, kheer (condensed milk), and ripe fruits such as mango, jackfruit, and banana, on festive occasions. Followers of Maha Shivaratri, Janmashtami and similar festivals prepare pholar.

== History ==
It is difficult to say exactly how old pholar is, but it was quite common in medieval Bengal. The chiṛabhog offered at Vaishnava festivals is another form of pholar. In the first half of the 16th century, when Nityananda Prabhu visited Panihati, devotee Raghunath Das organized the chiṛa-dadhi festival. At that event, large quantities of flattened rice, yogurt, milk, sandesh, and bananas were served to devotees. Some time later, during the Khardaha festival organized by Narottam Das, chiṛa-dadhi was also served. In Vaishnava festivals, this dish was distributed among devotees in clay pots or bowls. Pholar still has a significant presence in Vaishnava celebrations.

In Kavikankan Chandi, there is a mention of chiṛa chapakola dudher sor (flattened rice with ripe bananas and milk cream) and good buffalo-curd, puffed rice, sugar, and ripe bananas mixed to make pholar. In those days, before lunch, the women of the house would bathe and in the morning eat khanda (sugar lumps), bananas, flattened rice, and yogurt. Kavikankan Chandi contains:

After bathing, Durbola eats curd, sugar lumps, banana

Flattened rice and yogurt are given in plenty.

For breakfast, khanda sugar, and bananas were widely used in those times. In the unpublished Chandimangal poem by 18th-century poet Akinchan Chakrabarty, there is mention of Lohona offering Khullana these items for jalpan (light refreshment). It is said that Nadia-Krishnanagar played some role in making pholar more appealing. According to legend, a milkman of this area once served the then ruler of Nadia on banana leaves with fine flattened rice, kheer, yogurt, bananas, and other fruits, so impressively that the king was full of praise.

Later, the term pholar came to mean not only the combination of flattened rice, yogurt, and fruits, but also elaborate vegetarian feasts. Over time, the list of this ancient Bengali dish came to include luchi, kochuri, mithaimonda, and others.

== Classification ==
In the book Kulin Kulasarbasva written by Ramnarayan Tarkaratna in 1261 Bengali year, three types of pholar are described: uttam (superior), madhyam (medium), and adham (inferior).

Superior pholar:

Hot luchi fried in ghee a few slices of ginger

Two kochuri are also eaten with it.

Chhakka and fried greens, motichur bundi and khaja

Make a grand pholar arrangement.

Perfect jalebi and goja, chanabara of great taste

Hearing of it makes the mouth water.

Khuri puri with kheer, more is served if desired

With sliced sour yogurt.

Afterwards in the left hand with a dakshina paan in the right

This is called the superior pholar.

Medium pholar:

Fine flattened rice with sour yogurt crisp puffed rice

Khasta monda and patpura are there.

The medium pholar is given even to Vedic Brahmins

And includes dakshina.

Inferior pholar:

Coarse flattened rice with watery yogurt bitter molasses and rough puffed rice

If the stomach is not filled.

In the sun the head aches licking the leaf with hand

This is called inferior pholar.

Apart from the above classification, pholar is also divided into raw pholar and cooked pholar. The one with flattened rice, yogurt, sweets, and fruits is called raw pholar. Cooked pholar includes luchi. Generally, luchi with chhena (cottage cheese) and sugar is called cooked pholar.
