= Abdul Mannan Syed =

Bangladeshi researcher and writer (1943–2010)

- আবদুল মান্নান সৈয়দ
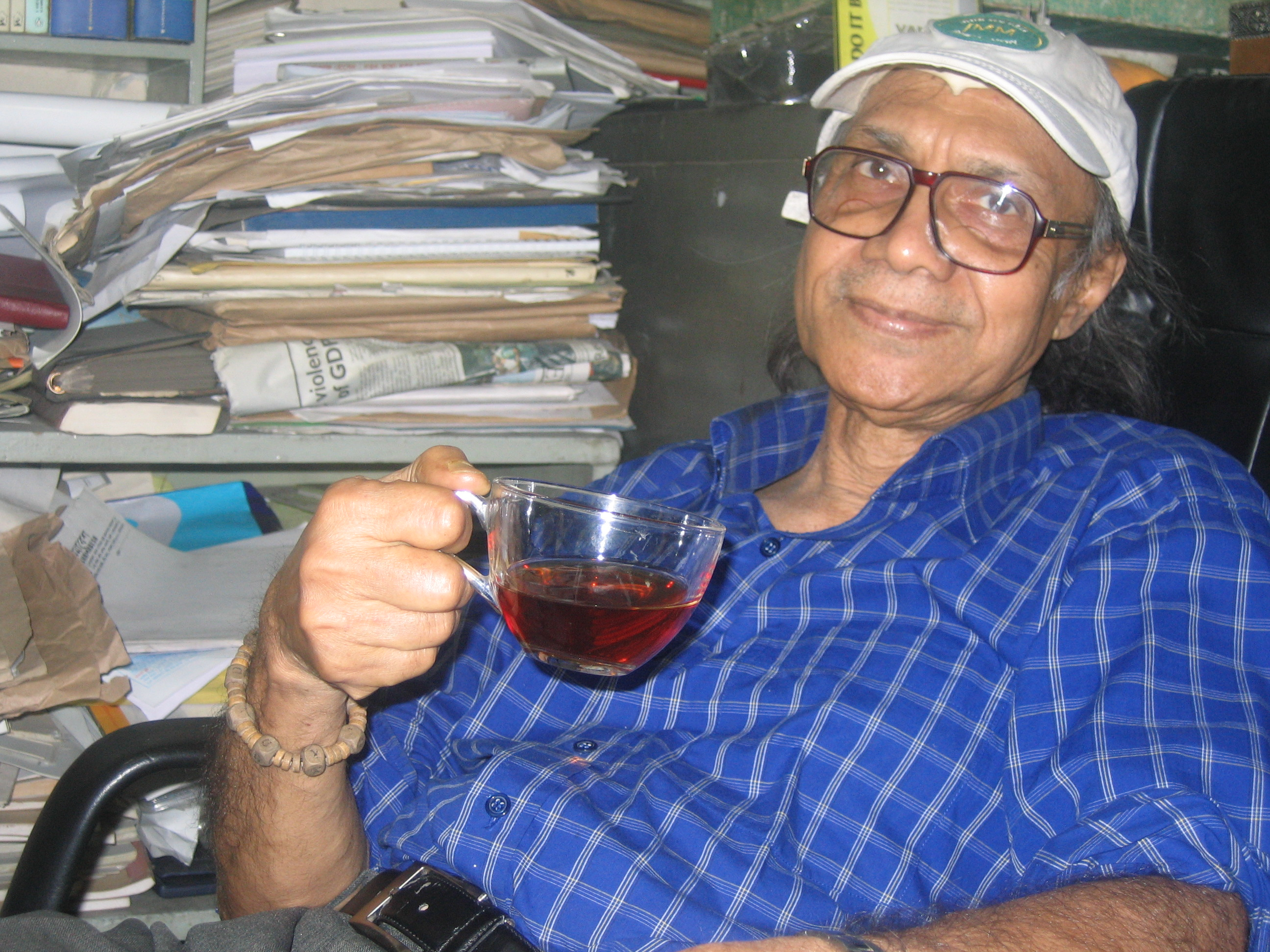
- Syed in 2009 (Dhaka)
- Born: 3 August 1943; Jalalpur, Basirhat, Bengal Presidency, British India
- Died: 5 September 2010 (aged 67); Dhaka, Bangladesh
- Occupations: Poet, academic, author
- Years active: 1967–2008

Abdul Mannan Syed (3 August 1943 – 5 September 2010) was a Bangladeshi poet, academic, and critic. He is known for his considerable research works on Kazi Nazrul Islam, Jibanananda Das, Farrukh Ahmad, Syed Waliullah, Manik Bandyopadhyay, Bishnu De, Samar Sen, Roquiah Sakhawat Hossain, Abdul Ghani Hazari, Muhammad Wajed Ali, and Prabodh Chandra Sen. From 2002 to 2004, he held the position of executive director of the Nazrul Institute.

== Life ==
Syed was born on 3 August 1943 at Basirhat, on the Ichamati River, in the district of 24 Parganas, in West Bengal of British India. In 1946, just before the partition of India, a lethal Hindu-Muslim riot took place and forced many Muslims to leave West Bengal to settle in East Bengal, now Bangladesh. A less discussed but equally fearsome riot took place in 1950 that drove the family of Syed from West Bengal and to settle in Dhaka, the provincial capital of the then East Pakistan, now Bangladesh. He lost his motherland forever and always felt like a refugee. They first lived in Gopibagh of Dhaka town. Shortly, his father bought a piece of land on the Green Road, formerly called Kuli Road. Since then 51 Green Road has been his address until his sudden death in September 2010.

His father, Syed A. M. Badruzzdoza, was a public official who served in many places in East Pakistan. He was very strict about the formal education of his children. He had six sons and four daughters. Syed was married to his cousin Syra Syed Ranu. His only child was a daughter named Jinan Syed Shampa. In 1958, Syed passed the Matriculation (now SSC) examination from the Nawabpur Government High School. In 1960, he passed the Intermediate (now HSC) from the Dhaka College. He studied Bengali language and literature at Dhaka University, from where he obtained his B.A. and M.A. degrees, respectively, in 1963 and 1964. Most of his life, he earned his livelihood as a teacher of Bengali language and literature in government colleges. He started his career as a lecturer at M. C. College of Sylhet town. He also taught at Sheikh Borhanuddin College in Faridpur town. However, he served at Jagannath College of Dhaka for a long time, from where he retired in 1998. He also served as the District Gazetteer for a period of time. Later he was appointed the executive director of the Nazrul Institute (2002–2004).

== Works ==
Syed is best known for his research on Bengali poet Jibanananda Das. Although he is most renowned for literary criticism, he is a versatile writer and poet. He taught in the department of Bengali at Jagannath College, Dhaka. Later he served as director general of the Nazrul Institute. He was the first scholar-in-residence in Bangladesh at North South University. For a long time he was associated with the Shilpataru, a monthly literary magazine published from Dhaka by poet Abid Azad.

== Death ==
He had been suffering from diabetes and cardiac troubles for a long time. On 27 August 2010, he fell sick while participating in an event of television network Channel I. On 5 September 2010, he was having an afternoon sleep when he suffered a massive cardiac arrest and succumbed to death just before Iftaar. On the following day, he was buried at the Azimpur Graveyard after three Salatul Janazas at Green Road Jam-e-Masjid, Bangla Academy, and Dhaka University mosque. His death was widely mourned across the country. All national dailies carried obituary on the following day. Next Friday, all dailies carried literary essays on his life and works. Electronic media also featured his death in a befitting manner.

== Works ==
=== Books of poetry ===
- Janmandho Kobita Guchcha (1967)
- Jyōtsnā raudrēra cikitsā জ্যোত্স্না রৌদ্রের চিকিত্সা [Moonlight, Treatment for the Sun] (1969)
- Matal Manchitro (1970)
- O Shongbedon O Joltorongo (1974)
- Selected Poems (1975) ( Muktodhara publication)
- Kobita Company Pvt Ltd. (1982)
- Porabastab Kobita (1982)
- Park Street e Ek Ratri (1983)
- Mach Series (1984)
- Amar Sonnet (1990)
- Shokal Proshongsha Tamar (1993)
- Nirobota Govirota Dui Bon Bole Kotha (1997)
- Selected Poems (2001)(Shomoy publication)
- Kobita Shomaggro (2001)
- Kobitar Boi (2006)
- He Bondhur Bondhu He Priyotomo (2006)
- Premer Kobita (2007)
- Matal Kobita Pagal goddya (2008)
- Ogghraner Nil Din (2008)

=== Novels ===
- Poriprekshiter Dasdasi (Slaves of Perspectives, 1974)
- Kolkata (1980)
- Poramatir Kaj (Terracotta, 1982)
- A-Te Ajgor (A for Ajogor, 1982)
- He Songsar He Lota (Oh the World, Oh the Creeper, 1982)
- Gavir Gavirtara Asukh (Disease, Deep and Deeper, 1983)
- Prabesh (Entrance, 1994)
- Kshuda Prem Agun (Hunger Love Fire, 1994)
- Shyamali Tomar Mukh (Shyamali Your Face, 1997)

=== Short stories ===
- Shotter moto bodmash (1968)
- Cholo jai porokkhe (1973)
- Mrittur odhik lal khudha (1977)
- Nirbachito golpo (1987)
- Utshob (1988)
- Nekre hayna ar tin pori (1997)
- Mach mangsho matshorjer rupkotha (2001)
- Nirbachito golpo (2002)
- Golpo (2004)
- Sreshtho golpo (2007)

=== Editorial works ===
- Life on Distant Shores, written by Abdur Rouf Choudhury, Bengali novel, published by Pathak Samabesh, Dhaka, 2003
- New Horizon, written by Abdur Rouf Choudhury, Bengali novel, published by Pathak Samabesh, Dhaka, 2005.
- Bangladesher Chhara, jointly edited with Shahabuddin Nagari and Abid Azad by Shilpatoru Prakashani, Dhaka, 1987.
- Bagladesher Kabita, jointly edited with Shahabuddin Nagari and Abid Azad by Shilpatoru Prakashani, Dhaka, 1987.

== Awards ==
- Bangla Academy Literary Award (1981)
- Alaol Literary Award (1981)
- Kabi Jasimuddin Award
- Chattagram Sangskriti Kendro Farrukh Memorial Award (1991)
