= Aju (disambiguation) =

Aju or AJU may refer to:

- Aju (1227–1287), a general and chancellor of the Mongol Empire and the Yuan Dynasty
- Aju Group (Hangul:아주그룹), a large South Korean chaebol (conglomerate), offering chemical, industry, logistic, financial, hotel and rental products
- American Jewish University, a Jewish institution in Los Angeles, California established in 1947
- AJU, IATA Airport Code for Santa Maria Airport (Sergipe)
- Ana Jet Üs (AJÜ), a component of the Turkish Air Force

== See also ==
- Aju Gossain (c. 18th century), a Bengali poet known for his parodies of Ramprasad Sen's songs
- Aju Varghese (born 1985), an Indian film actor in Malayalam cinema
- Singha Sartha Aju, a merchant in Nepalese folklore
