= Shreekrishna Kirtana =

Bengali pastoral Vaishnava drama by Boru Chandidas

Shreekrishna Kirtana Kabya (Bengali: শ্রীকৃষ্ণকীর্তন কাব্য) is a Bengali pastoral Vaishnava drama in verse composed by Boru Chandidas. It is considered to be one of the most significant works after Charyapada in the history of Bengali literature. These verses are believed to be written in the pre-Chaitanya era of the later half of 14th century CE.

== History of publication ==
In 1909, Basanta Ranjan Roy Bidvatballava retrieved the punthi (manuscript) of Sri Krishna Kirtana from a shelf in the cowshed of Debendranath Mukhopadhyay, a resident of Kankilya Village, Bankura. Since the punthi was found shorn of its pages including the opening and ending ones, its original name could not be ascertained. A slip inside the punthi reveals that it was initially preserved in the royal library of Bishnupur under the name of Sri Krishna Sandarva. However, the punthi, edited and rechristened as Shreekrishna Kirtana by Bidvatballava, was published by Vangiya Sahitya Parishad in 1916.

== Origin ==
The Sri Krishna Kirtana of Boru Chandidas was deeply influenced by the Vishnu Purana, the popular folk-literature of the period and the Gitagovindam by Jaydeva. The influence of other Puranas like the Padma Purana and the Brahma Vaivarta Purana and the Vaishnava scriptures is also substantial. There is a strong affinity of popular folk literature of the time in the style of the verse.

== Contents ==
Sri Krishna Kirtana consists of 418 Bengali padas (verses) and 133 Sanskrit shlokas (a total of 161, with 28 shlokas repeated twice), which were also likely composed by the poet. Among these 418 verses, 409 verses have the name of the author in them. The extant work is divided into 13 khandas (sections), namely, Janma (birth), Tamvula (piper betel which was considered as a token of love in that time), Dana (tax-collection), Nauka (boat), Bhara (burden), Vrindavana, Yamuna, Bana (arrow), Vamshi (flute) and Radha Viraha (estrangement of Radha) (the last khanda is not named by the poet). Yamuna khanda is further divided into three sub-sections. The first sub-section is Kaliya Damana khanda (coercion of Kaliya, the snake-demon section), and the third sub-section is Hara khanda (necklace section). The name of the second sub-section has not been found in the manuscript, but its subject matter is Radha's vastraharana (stealing Radha's robes). Bhara Khanda consists of a sub-section, named Chatra khanda (umbrella section). Three characters, Krishna, Radha and Badayi, the messenger interrelate the plot of the play. Dialogues and counter-dialogues in payar and tripadi meters have added to the dramatic quality of Sri Krishna Kirtana.

== Story ==
Shrikrsnakirtan is a lyrical composition involving Radha and Krishna; its storyline is not based on the Bhagavata Purana, but the popular folk-songs, known as the dhamalis. However, Baru Chandidas managed to add substantial originality, making it a masterpiece of medieval Bengali literature. It in the yearning of Radha, captures much of the social conditions of the day.

== Plot summary ==
The plot begins with Radha and Krishna, celestial beings predestined to incarnate as humans on Earth. Radha, in her human form, marries Ayan Gopa, a eunuch. Radha spends her days with Ayan's aunt, Barai, and travels to Mathura with other young women to sell milk products.

During a trip, Barai loses Radha and seeks help from Krishna, a charming youth. Intrigued by Radha's description, Krishna sends a romantic proposal to Radha, which she refuses, honoring her marital vows. Krishna then playfully obstructs Radha's path, asking for an intimate favor as a toll. Radha, standing firm, considers drastic measures to evade Krishna's advances but ends up succumbing to his persistence in the forest.

As the seasons change, Radha, burdened by guilt and shame, isolates herself. Krishna, pining for her, devises a plan to bring her back into the open. Disguised, he meets Radha and persuades her to sell milk and curd again, but his identity is soon revealed. Krishna continues his pursuit, but Radha skillfully dodges his advances.

Krishna's love takes a creative turn as he beautifies Vrindavan to attract Radha. His valor is further displayed when he confronts Kaliya, a mythical five-headed snake in the River Yamuna, and seemingly vanishes, causing panic among the villagers.

Radha, frustrated by Krishna's antics, complains to his foster mother, Yashoda. Krishna, irked, is advised by Barai to cast a love spell on Radha. Struck by a flower arrow, Radha falls deeply in love with Krishna. Her obsession grows, leading her to steal Krishna's flute to gain control over their relationship.

Krishna, in response, feigns indifference, leaving Radha in despair. Her longing intensifies, and she searches for him, eventually finding him in Vrindavan. A confrontation ensues, where Radha pleads for forgiveness and Krishna, softening, agrees to reconcile if advised by Barai.

However, the story takes a tragic turn when Krishna, after a brief reunion, leaves for Mathura to confront Kamsa, leaving Radha heartbroken. Despite Barai's intervention, Krishna refuses to return to Vrindavan or accept Radha again, unable to bear the harsh words and treatment he received from her.
