= Gobinda Halder =

Bengali lyricist

- গোবিন্দ হালদার
- Born: 1930; Bangaon, Bengal Presidency, British India
- Died: 17 January 2015 (aged 84–85); Kolkata, West Bengal, India
- Occupations: Lyricist, Poet
- Movement: Bangladesh Liberation War
- Honours: Post Graduate in Economics

Gobinda Halder (1930 – 17 January 2015) was a Bengali lyricist and poet. He wrote patriotic songs during the Bangladesh Liberation War of 1971 which include "Mora Ekti Phulke Bachabo Bole Juddho Kori", "Ek Sagor Rokter Binimoye Banglar Swadhinata Anlo Jara", "Purbo Digonte Surjo Uthechhe Rokto Lal", and "Padma Meghna Jamuna Tomar Amar Thikana".

== Early life ==
Halder was born at Bangaon, Bengal Presidency in August 1930. He completed his school education in Bongaon. He completed his graduation and post-graduation in Bengali from Calcutta University. Later he joined the income tax department and retired in July 1988.

His patriotic songs started being aired in June 1971 from the Swadhin Bangla Betar Kendra. Belal Muhammad, the cofounder of the Kendra, stated in his book that no foreigner was allowed to write or perform songs for the Kendra so Halder was not credited. He visited Bangladesh once in June 1972 and met the Kendra authority who agreed to credit him but was never given remuneration.

== Works ==
Halder wrote nearly 3500 semi-classical, folk, baul, kirtan, Shyama Sangeet and modern Bengali songs. He stopped writing when he lost sight following glaucoma.

He composed large number of patriotic songs during the Bangladesh Liberation War in 1971. Some of them are Mora Ekti Phulke Bachabo Bole Juddho Kori, Ek Sagor Rokter Binimoye Banglar Swadhinata Anlo Jara, Purbo Digonte Surjo Uthechhe Rokto Lal and Padma Meghna Jamuna Tomar Amar Thikana. His song Ek Sagor Rokter Binimoye was popular during war and later was adopted as a signature tune of Bangladesh TV in the 1990s. Though his songs were popular during war and his other songs were aired on All India Radio and Doordarshan, he never got the acknowledgement.

His first book Door Digonte was published with only five hundred copies in 1989 and were sold out but he could not manage to reprint.

== Honors ==
Halder was awarded the Friends of Liberation War Award by Government of Bangladesh in Dhaka in 2012.

== Personal life ==
Halder was married to Parul Halder and had a daughter, Gopa.

== Death ==
Halder was hospitalised on 13 December 2014 in Kolkata following age related ailments and kidney problems. He died one month later, on 17 January 2015 at Kolkata, West Bengal, India, aged 84.

== See also ==
- List of Bengali poets
