= Dvija Madhab =

Dvija Madhab (Bengali: দ্বিজ মাধব), or Madhabacharya (Bengali: মাধবাচার্য) (c. 16th century), was a Bengali poet of the Middle Ages and one of the most significant contributor to Chandimangalkavya tradition of medieval Bengali literature. His work, Sarada Charit (Bengali: সারদাচরিত), also known as Sarada Mangal Jagaran (Bengali: সারদামঙ্গল জাগরণ) or Mangalchandir Geet (Bengali: মঙ্গলচণ্ডীর গীত), was probably written in 1579.

Dvija Madhab was born in the Saptagram-Tribeni area of Hooghly, situated in the Sultanate of Bengal. His father Parashar, as mentioned in the Sarada Charit, was a Brahmin. Dvija Madhab is also attributed as the author of Sri Krishna Mangal, another narrative poem popular among the Vaishnavas; but its authorship is doubted by scholars.

The manuscripts of Dvija Madhab's work are found in Chittagong region of modern-day Bangladesh, where the poet probably had migrated from western Bengal in his later years.
