= Mukundaram Chakrabarti =

16TH century Bengali poet

Kabikankan Mukundaram Chakrabarti (Bengali: কবিকঙ্কণ মুকুন্দরাম চক্রবর্তী) ( 1547 - Early 1600s ) was a 16th-century Bengali poet who is best known for writing the epic poem Chandimangal, which is considered one of the most prominent works of Mangalkavyas, one of the most important sub-genres of medieval Bengali literature.

== Early life ==
Mukundaram Chakrabarti was born to Hriday Mishra and Doiboki the village of Daminya in present-day Bardhaman of West Bengal. He was forced to leave his ancestral home due to the oppression of the zamindar (dihidar)of the region Mahmud Sharif who was more Mughal-aligned. He received refuge and patronage from ruler Bir Bankura Roy, who ruled over Brahmanbhum area of Midnapore and was a devotee of the goddess Chandi In Adra, he composed the Chandimangal-kavya, which earned him the title of Kabikankan.

== Chandimangal ==
His most celebrated work Chandimangal, is a commentary on the socio-political scene in medieval Bengal. He describes his own travels and hardships while taking refuge in behind the story of Kallaketu, a poor hunter and Dhanpati, a wealthy merchant and their wives both of whom get trapped in hardships and are subsequently rescued by Abhaya or Chandi, both of whom are folk goddesses. The Chandimangal provides a rich and detailed account of the complex social structures present in medieval Bengal.
