= Atin Bandyopadhyay =

Indian writer (1934–2019)

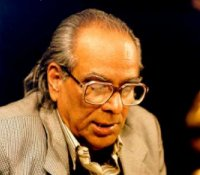
- Bandyopadhyay in July 2012
- Born: 1 March 1934; Bikrampur, Bengal Presidency, British India (now in Bangladesh)
- Died: 19 January 2019 (aged 84); Kolkata, West Bengal, India
- Occupation: Writer
- Awards: Sahitya Akademi Award

Atin Bandyopadhyay or Atin Banerjee (1934–2019) was an Indian writer of Bengali literature.

== Early life ==
Atin Bandyopadhyay was born in 1934 in a Rarhi Kulin Brahmin family from Sammandi, Bikrampur, Dhaka. He spent his childhood in a joint family set-up in the then-East Bengal of undivided India and studied at Sonar Gaon Panam School. Following the Partition, he then migrated to India. He earned his undergraduate degree in commerce in 1956 and subsequently earned a teacher's training degree, both from the University of Calcutta. He took various jobs, working as a sailor, a truck cleaner, and a primary school teacher. He also became the headmaster of a senior basic school. Subsequently, he became the headmaster of Satui Rajendra Narayan High School, which is situated near the Chowrigacha Railway Station in the Murshidabad district. Atin Bandyopadhyay settled permanently in Kolkata in 1986. Here, he worked as a factory manager, a publication advisor, and a journalist.

== Career as a writer ==
Bandyopadhyay's first story was published in the magazine Abasar of Berhampore. He later penned many works, but his masterpiece is considered to be a four-part tetralogy on the Partition: Nilkantha Pakhir Khonje, Manusher Gharbari, Aloukik Jalajan, and Ishwarer Bagan. Another famous Bengali writer, Syed Mustafa Siraj, has compared Nilkantha Pakhir Khonje with Greek tragedies and has also found it in tune with the core spirit of Bengali literature, such as Bibhutibhushan Bandyopadhyay's Pather Panchali.

== Selected works ==
=== Works aimed at a younger audience ===
- Uronto Torobari (Ananda Pub)
- Gini Rohosyo (Ananda Pub)
- Binnir Khoi Lal Batasa (Ananda Pub)
- Dosti Kishore Uponyas (Ananda Pub)
- Paloker Tupi (Punascha)
- Neel Timi (Karuna Prakashoni)
- Fentur Sada Ghora (Karuna Prakashoni)

=== Dosti Kishore Uponyas ===
- Fentur Sada Ghora
- Rajar Bari
- Binnir Khoi Lal Batasa
- Aronyorajye Mandela
- Neel Timi
- Uronto Torobari
- Hirer Cheyeo Dami
- Ekti joler rekha o Ora teen jon
- Gini Rohosyo
- Dustu Hititi
