= Dom Antonio =

First writer of Bangla prose

Personal life
- Born: c. 1643
- Died: 1695

Religious life
- Religion: Christianity

Dom Antonio de Rozario (c. 1643 – 1695) was a Christian missionary from Bengal. He was the first writer of Bangla prose.

== Biography ==
Antonio was born on circa 1643 in a jomidar family of Bhushana in the Jessore-Faridpur areas. He was the prince of Bhushsna. His Bengali name could not be discovered.

Antonio was kidnapped by Portuguese pirates in 1663. He was taken to Arakan to sell him as a slave. He was rescued by a Portuguese priest named Manoel de Rozario. Later, he was converted to Christianity and took the name Dom Antonio de Rozario.

Antonio returned to Bhushana in 1666 and started to preach Christianity. He converted his wife, kith and kins and subjects into Christianity. He founded St. Nicholas Tolentino Church and Mission in Koshavanga village. Later, the Church and Mission were transferred to Nagori village of Bhawal Pargana of Dhaka.

Antonio wrote a book titled Brahman Roman Catholic Sambad. The 120 page book contained a religious debate between a Brahmin and a Roman Catholic. The book was translated into Portuguese by Manuel da Assumpção and the translated book was published by Francisco Da Silva from Lisbon in 1743. Later, the main manuscript was collected by Surendranath Sen and he edited the book. The edited book was published by the University of Calcutta in 1937. The book was first Bangla book translated by a foreigner.

Antonio died in 1695.
