= Prabodh Chandra Sengupta =

Indian mathematics Professor and Historian of ancient Indian astronomy (1867-1962)

- Born: 21 June 1876
- Died: 1962 (aged 85–86)
- Scientific career
- Fields: astronomy

Prabodh Chandra Sengupta (21 June 1876 – 1962) was a historian of ancient Indian astronomy. He was a Professor of Mathematics at Bethune College in Calcutta and a lecturer in Indian Astronomy and Mathematics at the University of Calcutta.

== Early life ==
Prabodh Chandra Sengupta, the younger son of Ram Chandra Sengupta, was born in a village near Tangail in Mymensingh district (now in Bangladesh) on 21 June 1876. He had his early education in the Santosh Jahnavi H. E. School and passed the Entrance (Matric) examination with sufficient merit to obtain a scholarship.

== Major works ==
- Ancient Indian chronology (1947)
- Khandakhadyaka: an astronomical treatise of Brahmagupta
- Āryabhaṭīya by Āryabhaṭa I
- Āryabhaṭa I, the father of Indian epicyclic astronomy
- Surya Siddhanta: a textbook of Hindu astronomy (along with Ebenezer Burgess, Phanindralal Gangooly)
- Greek and Hindu methods in spherical astronomy (1931)
