= Mangal-Kāvya =

Group of Bengali Hindu religious texts

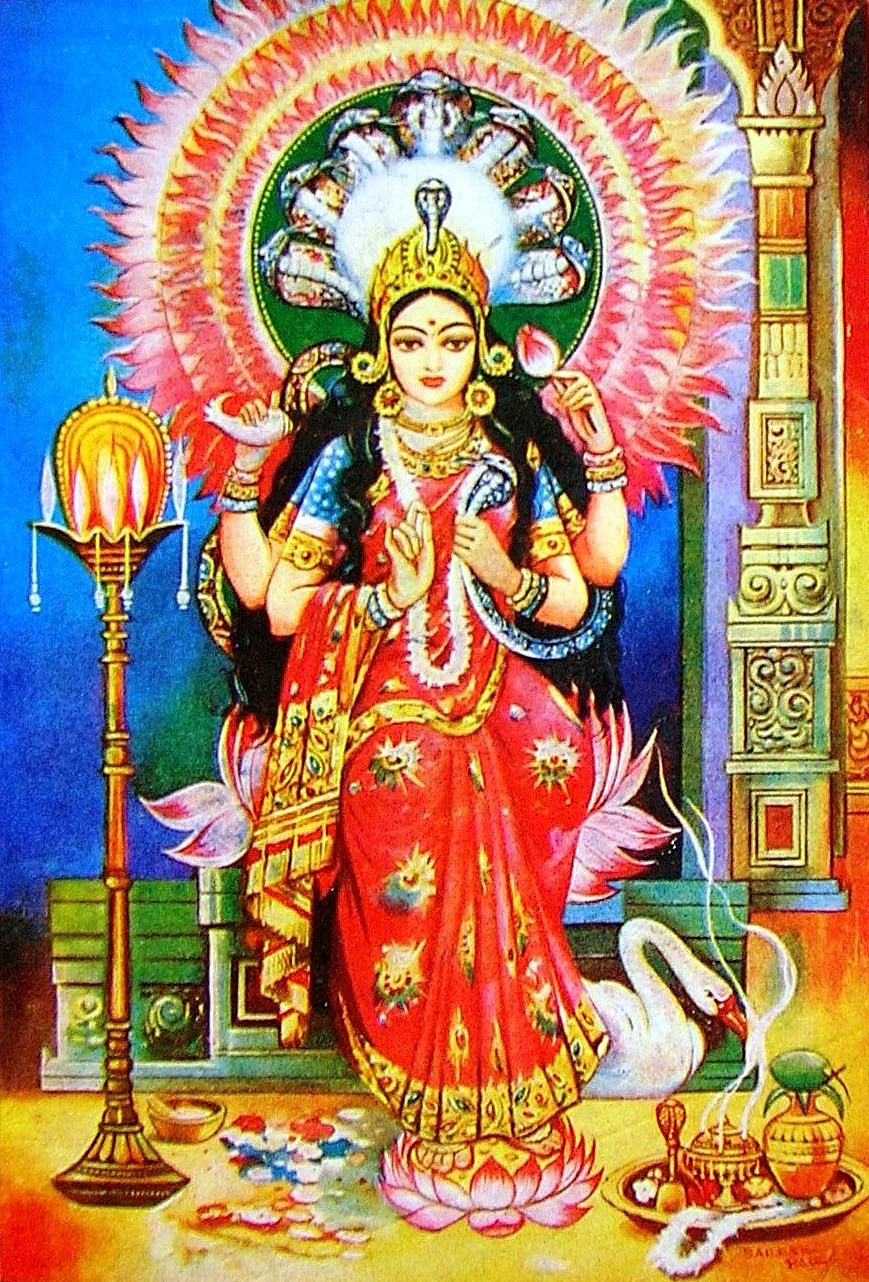
Depiction of Manasā, the snake-goddess in 20th century Bengali popular art.

Mangal-Kāvya (Bengali: মঙ্গলকাব্য; lit. "Poems of Benediction") is a group of Bengali religious texts, composed more or less between 13th and 18th centuries, notably consisting of narratives of indigenous deities of rural Bengal in the social scenario of the Middle Ages. The Mangal-Kāvyas usually give prominence to a particular deity amalgamated with a Vedic or Hindu mythological god and the narratives are usually written in the form of verses.

Manasā Mangal, Chandī Mangal and Dharma Mangal, the three major genus of Mangal-Kāvya tradition include the portrayal of the magnitude of Manasā, Chandī and Dharmathakur respectively. They are considered the greatest among all the native divinities in Bengal. But restraining the accounts of other deities, there are also minor Mangal-Kāvyas known as Shivāyana, Kālikā Mangal, Rāya Mangal, Shashtī Mangal, Sītalā Mangal and Kamalā Mangal etc. Each strain is composed by more than one poet or group of poets who are on the whole the worshipper of the god or goddess concerning their verses.

The Mangal-Kāvya tradition is an archetype of the synthesis between the Vedic and the popular folk culture of India. Lila Ray elaborates: “Indigenous myths and legends inherited from Indo-Aryan cultures began to blend and crystallize around popular deities and semi-mythological figures during the fourteenth and fifteenth centuries. A new cosmogony emerged—distinct from the Sanskrit tradition yet bearing an unmistakable affinity to the cosmogonic hymns of the Rigveda and the Polynesian myth of creation.”

== Etymology ==
The word Mangal-Kāvya comes out as an amalgamation of the two Bengali Sanskritisms, Mangal (Benediction) and Kavya (Poems). These are so named because it was believed that listening to these verses concerning the auspicious divinities would bring both spiritual and material benefits. Though some scholars of the early modern period tried to find out any other significance of the word Mangal that was frequently used in the medieval Bengali literature irrespective of any designated tradition. But all these speculations are now firmly discarded by the recent school of intellectuals.

1. Listening to them was said to bring spiritual and material benefits ("mangal").
2. They were sung in the Mangal raga.
3. They were read out in rituals extending from one "Mangalbar" (Tuesday) to the next.

== Poems ==
Mangalkavya were used to describe the greatness of particular Hindu deities known as "nimnokoti" (roughly translating as lower) by historians, because they were absent or unimportant in classical Hindu literature such as the Vedas or Puranas. These deities were based on indigenous to Bengal (like Manasa) who had become assimilated in regional Hinduism. These deities are often depicted with unusually strong human qualities and they engage in direct interaction with humans. They are also portrayed to have flaws such as envy like other human beings.

In the time period when they were produced, Mangalkavya was the representation of nearly all medieval Bengali literature. Mangalkavya was the main form of expression in the Later Middle Period of the language.

== Construction ==
Mangalkavyas were composed of four parts: the Vandana, the Reasoning, the Devakhanda, and the Narakhanda.

== Characteristics ==
Mangals are usually similar in form though variant in length. They are written for the most part in the simple payar meter, a couplet form with the rhyme scheme AA BB which is considered an appropriate form for oral literature.

== Usage ==
They are often recited at the festivals of the deities mentioned in the kavya. The popular ones are sung to entertain village audiences as Bhajans. Many variants exist, since singers may change the verses. Most are written in simple couplets, using earthy imagery drawn from simple objects like: village, field, and river.

== Effects ==
The spread of Mangalkavya increased throughout Bengal around the late 18th century. It has been documented in the city of Majilpur that the number of Shiva mandirs increased tremendously after Mangalkavya began being composed in the vicinity.

== Kavya ==
The main Mangalkavyas include Manasamangalkavya, Chandimangalkavya, Dharmamangalkavya and Annadamangalkavya, with Manasamangal being the most famous. It is widely considered to be one of the most important works ever of Bengali literature and references to stories of Manasamangal abound in literature even to this day because of their highly symbolic value. There are also other minor Mangalkavyas such as Raimangalkavya in the Sundarban region.

== See also ==
- Chaitanya Bhagavata
- Tulsidas
- Bhakti
- Bengali literature
