= Chandimangal =

Subgenre of the Mangalkavya

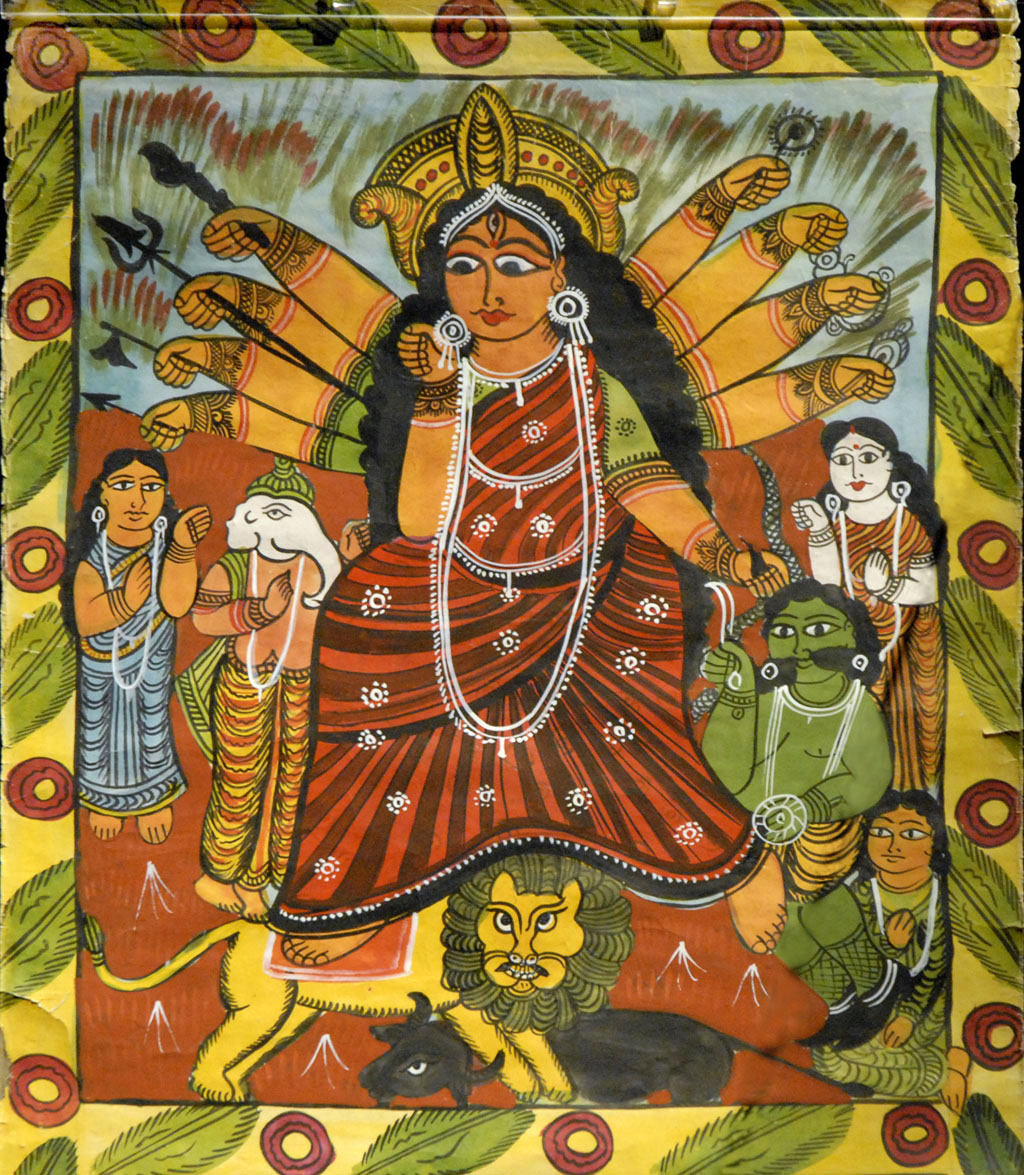
From exhibition "Singing Pictures, art and performance of naya's women" at the National Museum of Ethnology in Lisbon

The Chandimangal (Bengali: চণ্ডীমঙ্গল) is an important subgenre of mangalkavya, the most significant genre of medieval Bengali literature. The texts belonging to this subgenre eulogize Chandi or Abhaya, primarily a folk goddess, but subsequently identified with Puranic goddess Chandi. This identification was probably completed a few centuries before the earliest composition of the Chandimangalkavya. Most of the texts of this subgenre comprises two unrelated narratives. The narrative of Kalketu and Phullara is known as the Akhetik Khanda (hunter section), and the narrative of Dhanapati and his wives, Lahana and Khullana is known as the Banik Khanda (merchant section). Both of these narratives were probably mentioned in a sloka of the Brihaddharma Purana (Bangabasi edition, Uttarkhanda, Ch.16) also. In Mukundaram's work an additional section, Deb Khanda is found. This section comprises the narratives of Sati and Parvati and has mostly followed the Puranas.

== Narrative of Kalketu ==
The narrative of Kalketu begins with the birth of Nilambar, a disciple of Shiva in heaven as Kalketu, the son of Dharmaketu, a poor hunter and Nidaya. When Kalketu grew up, he was married to Phullara. Once, Kalketu found a golden iguana, (actually goddess Chandi in disguise) on his way and brought her to his hut for eating. After arrival, Chandi appeared before Phullara as a charming lady. When she saw their extremely impoverished condition, Chandi felt sorry for them and granted them good fortune. Kalketu and Phullara became enormously wealthy overnight. They founded a new town, Gujarat with their wealth. Amongst the people who came to settle in the new town, a fraud Bhandu Datta became a close associate of Kalketu. Initially, Kalketu had faith on Bhandu, but when he came to know about his atrocities towards his subjects, Kalketu threw him out of his court. Bhandu went to Kalinga and instigated the king of Kalinga to attack Kalketu. Kalketu was defeated and imprisoned. But finally by the grace of Chandi he was succeeded to overcome all problems and went back to heaven after death.

== Narrative of Dhanapati ==
The second narrative begins with the birth of Ratnamala, a dancer in the court of Indra in heaven as Khullana, a cousin of Lahana, who was later married to Dhanapati. Dhanapati was a wealthy merchant, and a devout worshipper of Shiva. Attracted by the beauty of his sister-in-law, Khullana, he marries her. Soon after their marriage, he sets forth on his travels to Gaur, leaving Khullana in the care of his first wife Lahana. Meanwhile, back home, Lahana, incited by her maid, Dubala, starts torturing Khullana. She was ordered to take their goats for grazing every morning. One day, one of her goats was lost. Khullana was frightened of its consequences. At this moment, Chandi sent eight Vidyadharis to teach Khullana her worship. Khullana worshipped Chandi and received her blessings. As a result, Lahana stopped torturing her and Dhanapati also came back. Dhanapati again set forth on a journey, this time to Sinhala, leaving Khullana at home. Before the journey, he made a grave mistake of opposing Chandi worship by Khullana. During his journey Dhanapati meets with misfortune and is imprisoned by the king of Sinhala. Meanwhile, Khullana gave birth to a son whom she names Sripati (or Srimanta). When Sripati grew up, he went to Sinhala. He was also imprisoned and received capital punishment from the king of Sinhala. But by the grace of Chandi, he was saved and he rescued his father from the prison of Sinhala. Sripati married Sushila, the princess of Sinhala. Dhanapati was finally forced to acknowledge that Chandi and Shiva are the same and started worshipping her.

== Poets of the Chandimangalkavya ==
The Chandimangalkavya's earliest poet was Manik Datta, who probably hailed from Maldaha and pre-dated Chaitanya Mahaprabhu. A copy of his work, dated 1785 has been found. Other poets of the Chandimangalkavya include Dvija Madhab or Madhabananda (also known as Madhab Acharya) and Kabikankan Mukundaram, both belonging to the 16th century and both influenced by Vaishnava philosophy popularised by Chaitanya. Dvija Madhab's work, dated 1501 Saka era (1579), gave definite shape to the narratives of Chandimangal. A number of small lyrics on the pattern of Vaishnava padas have also been inserted into the text. All the manuscripts of his work are found from Noakhali and Chittagong region. Mukundaram is considered by a number of modern scholars as the most celebrated poet of the mangalkavyas. His work, known as the Abhayamangal is dated 1466 Saka era (1544). He excelled in portraying the joys and sorrows of human life especially in his narrative of Kalketu. His characters are full of life even as he imparted to them a sense of universality and humanity.

Dvija Ramdeb's Abhayamangal is another work belonging to the subgenre of Chandimangalkavya. It was composed in Chittagong and reveals some influences of the local dialect. The use of the word ferangi (foreigner), suggests that it might have been written towards the mid-17th century, after the appearance of the Portuguese in Bengal. The versification reflects the influence of Dvija Madhab.

Dvija Hariram's Adrijamangal (c.1673-74) and Akinchan (Mishra) Chakrabarty's Chandimangal (1773) were another two works belonging to this subgenre composed in the present-day Ghatal subdivision of the Paschim Medinipur district. Another late work of this subgenre was written by Dvija Janardan.

== Social life in the Chandimangalkavya ==
Though, these narratives were developed to describe the power of Chandi and establish her worship, they reveal many aspects of the social life in medieval Bengal, when these genre of poems were written. During this period, polygamy was a common feature amongst both the rich and the poor. During the early Mughal rule, corruption amongst the lower and middle level imperial officers in Bengal was common. Mukundaram, in his work described vividly about the maritime activities, growth of towns, and the life-styles of various urban and rural communities in medieval Bengal.

The work also features the historical process in which the clearing of forests for new settlements were undertaken. The poem also mentions the influential role Muslims played in establishing the settlements, with the character Kalaketu receiving aid from them to help form a new town.

== See also ==
- Mangal-Kāvya
- Kabikankan Mukundaram Chakrabarti
