= Girindramohini Dasi =

Indian poet

- Born: 18 August 1858; Bhawanipore, Calcutta, British India
- Died: 16 August 1924 (aged 65); Calcutta, British India
- Occupation: Poet

Girindramohini Dasi (1858 - 1924) was an Indian poet of Bengali origin, best known for her poetry collections Abhas (1890), Flame (1898), and Arghya (1902); and dramas Sannyasini and Mirabai (1892), and Sindhugatha (1906).
