= Motiur Rahman Mollik =

Bangladeshi poet, writer, singer

- মতিউর রহমান মল্লিক
- Born: March 1, 1950; Bagherhat, Baroipara
- Died: 12 August 2010 (aged 60); Dhaka, Bangladesh
- Occupations: Poet, novelist, short-story writer
- Children: 3
- Writing career
- Subjects: Poetry, music, politics, society
- Notable works: Abortito Trinolota; Rongin Megher Palki; Onoboroto Brikhkher Gaan; Nishonno Nirer Pakhi
- Website: kobimollikfoundation.org

Motiur Rahman Mollik (Bengali: মতিউর রহমান মল্লিক; 1950 – 2010) was a poet lyricist, compositor, writer, organizer, researcher, editor, singer and a cultural leader. He was one of the modern poets of Bengali literature.

== Biography ==
He is often called the poet of Renaissance and is remembered after the name of Kazi Nazrul Islam, the national poet of Bangladesh. His surviving works include articles consists of around two thousand songs, four poetry books, two lyrical and one juvenile books. Some of his works have been translated in many languages and some have been included in the text books for the young learners.

== Life ==
Motiur Rahman Mollik was born at the village Baruipara under Bagherhat Sadar Thana of Bagherhat District. He was the last child of the three sons and two daughters. Mollik was the youngest child of Munshi Kayem Uddin Mollik. His mother was Asia Khatun. At the age of 34, he married Sabina Yesmin, with whom he had two daughters and one son.

== Education ==
Motiur Rahman Mollik started his education life at Barui Para Siddikia senior Madrasah. Then he studied at lawri Madsasah, Jessore, Khulna alia Madrasah, Bagerhat P.C. College and Department of Bangla, Jagannath College (Now Jagannath University), Dhaka.

== Works ==
Between 1980 and 1990, he became a prominent poet and singer, and gave birth of many successful organizations, one of which is Saimum Shilpi Goshthi, a famous cultural organization of Bangladesh. In addition, he worked for some of the well known monthly magazines e.g. Kolom, weekly newspaper Shonar Bangla and daily newspaper Shongram. He was working as the executive director of Bangladesh Shangskreetic Kendro at the time of his death.

- Abortito Trinolota,
- Rongin Megher Palki,
- Onoboroto Brikhkher Gaan,
- Nishonno Nirer Pakhi

are his poetry books. His lyrical paperbacks are

- Jhonkaar and
- Joto Gaan Geyechi.

Nirbachito Probondho is a collection of his articles.

== Awards ==
Motiur Rahman Mollik was awarded by many organizations. Among them Shobuj Mitali Shongo Literature award, National Literature Gold Medal, Kolom Shena award, Baitush Sharaf award, International Mother Language Day Literature award (France), Bangla Shahitto Songskriti Shongshod award, Kishorkontho Literature award, Bangla Shahitto Porishod award etc.
