= Bengali literature =

Literature written in the Bengali language

Bengali literature বাংলা সাহিত্য
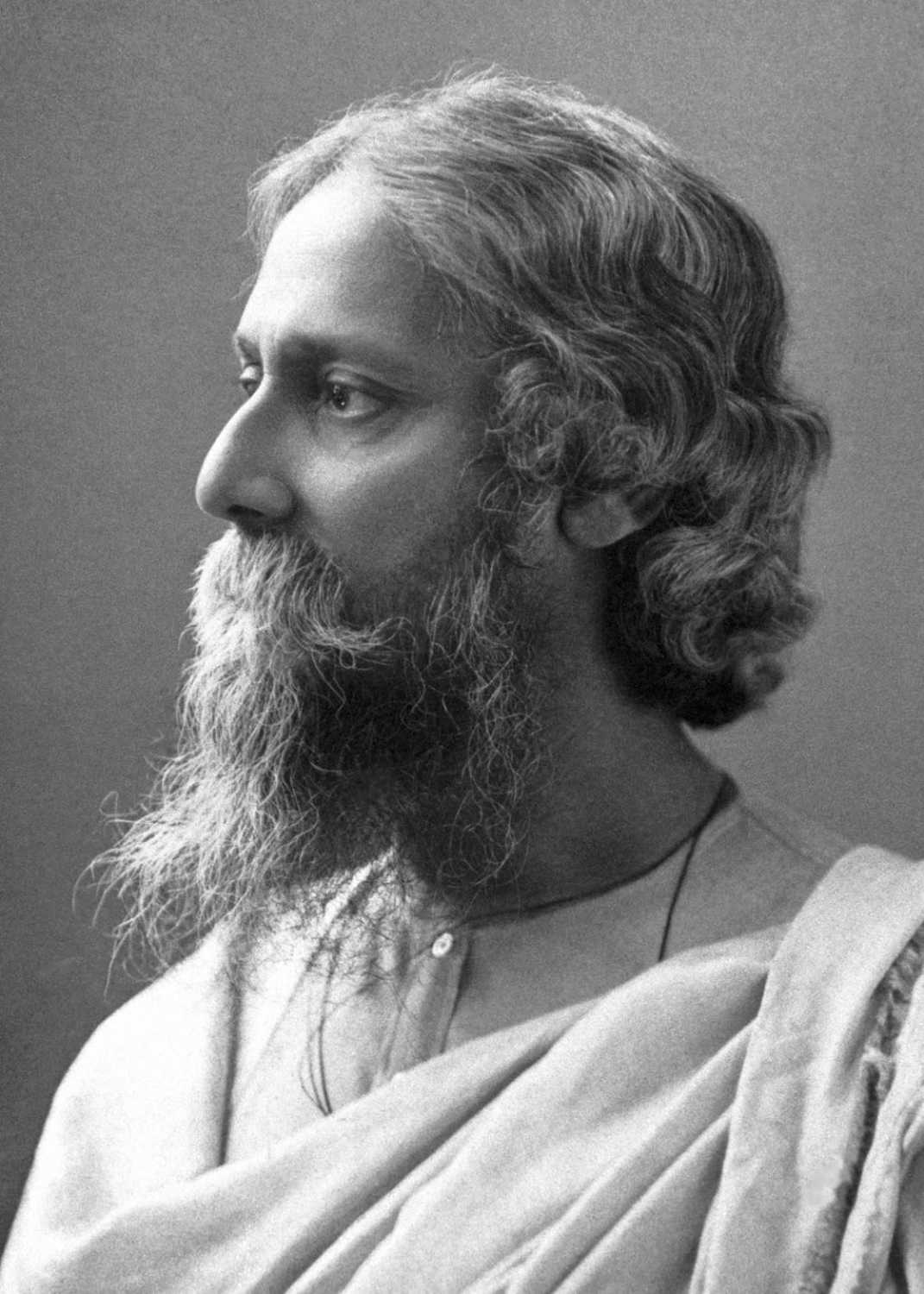
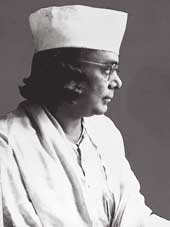
- (clockwise from top to bottom :); The oldest bengali script 'The charyapada' (top), Kazi Nazrul Islam (Bottom right), Rabindranath Tagore (Bottom left).

Bengali literature
- By category Bengali language

Bengali language authors
- Chronological list – Alphabetic List

Bengali writers
- Writers – Novelists – Poets

Forms
- Novel – Poetry – Science Fiction

Institutions and awards
- Literary Institutions; Literary Prizes

Bengali literature (Bengali: বাংলা সাহিত্য, romanized: Bangla Shahittô) denotes the body of writings in the Bengali language and which covers Old Bengali, Middle Bengali and Modern Bengali with the changes through the passage of time and dynastic patronization or non-patronization. Bengali has developed over the course of roughly 1,400 years. If the emergence of the Bengali literature supposes to date back to roughly 650 AD, the development of Bengali literature claims to be 1600 years old. The earliest extant work in Bengali literature is the Charyapada, a collection of Buddhist mystic songs in Old Bengali dating back to the 8th century. The timeline of Bengali literature is divided into three periods: ancient (650–1200), medieval (1200–1800) and modern (after 1800). Medieval Bengali literature consists of various poetic genres, including Hindu religious scriptures (e.g. Mangalkavya), Islamic epics (e.g. works of Syed Sultan and Abdul Hakim), Vaishnava texts (e.g. biographies of Chaitanya Mahaprabhu), translations of Arabic, Persian and Sanskrit texts, and secular texts by Muslim poets (e.g. works of Alaol). Novels were introduced in the mid-19th century. Nobel laureate Rabindranath Tagore is the best-known figure of Bengali literature to the world. Kazi Nazrul Islam, notable for his activism and anti-British literature, was described as the Rebel Poet and is now recognised as the National poet of Bangladesh.

== Ancient ==
The first works in Bengali appeared between 8th and 12th centuries C.E. It is generally known as the Charyapada and are 47 mystic hymns composed by various Buddhist monks, namely; Luipada, Kanhapada, Kukkuripada, Chatilpada, Bhusukupada, Kamlipada, Dhendhanpada, Shantipada and Shabarapada amongst others. The manuscript was discovered on a palm leaf in the Nepal Royal Court Library in 1907 by the Bengali linguist Haraprasad Shastri. Due to the language of these manuscripts only being partially understood, they were classified by Shastri with the name Shôndha Bhasha (সন্ধ্যা ভাষা), meaning dusk language.

== Medieval (1200–1800) ==
=== Early medieval/Transitional (1200–1350) ===
This period is considered to be the time in which many common proverbs and rhymes first emerged. The Bengali alphabet became a lot like what it currently is. Ramai Pandit and Halayudh Misra were notable writers of this period.

=== Nath Literature ===
Nath Literature is a distinctive branch of medieval Bengali literature, rooted in the teachings and spiritual practices of the Nath yogis. Originating from the 10th century, it combines elements of Buddhist, Shaiva, and folk traditions, and centers on themes like yoga, devotion to the guru, and mystical discipline. Notable works include 'Goraksha Bijoy' and songs about Maynamati and Gopichandra, which blend supernatural stories with lessons on renunciation, self-control, and spiritual achievement. Passed down through both oral and written traditions, Nath Literature has played a key role in shaping Bengal's religious culture, rural society, and folk heritage, and remains influential in Bengali folk songs even today.

=== Pre-Chaitanya (1350–1500) ===
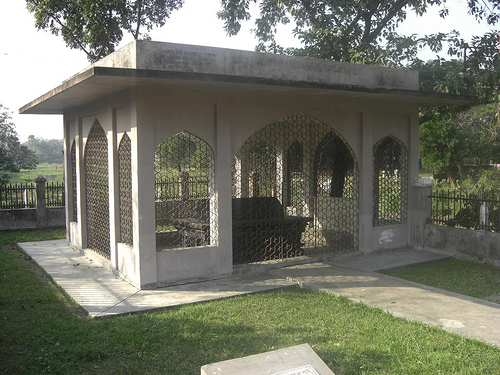
The tomb of Ghiyasuddin Azam Shah, under whose patronage were writers such as Shah Muhammad Sagir and Krittibas Ojha.

Muslim writers were exploring different themes through narratives and epics such as religion, culture, cosmology, love and history; often taking inspiration from or translating Arabic and Persian literary works such as the Thousand and One Nights and the Shahnameh. The literary romantic tradition saw poems by Shah Muhammad Sagir on Yusuf and Zulaikha, as well as works of Zainuddin and Sabirid Khan. The Dobhashi culture introduced Arabic and Persian vocabulary into Bengali texts to illustrate Muslim stories. Epic poetry included Nabibangsha by Syed Sultan and Rasul Bijoy by Shah Barid.

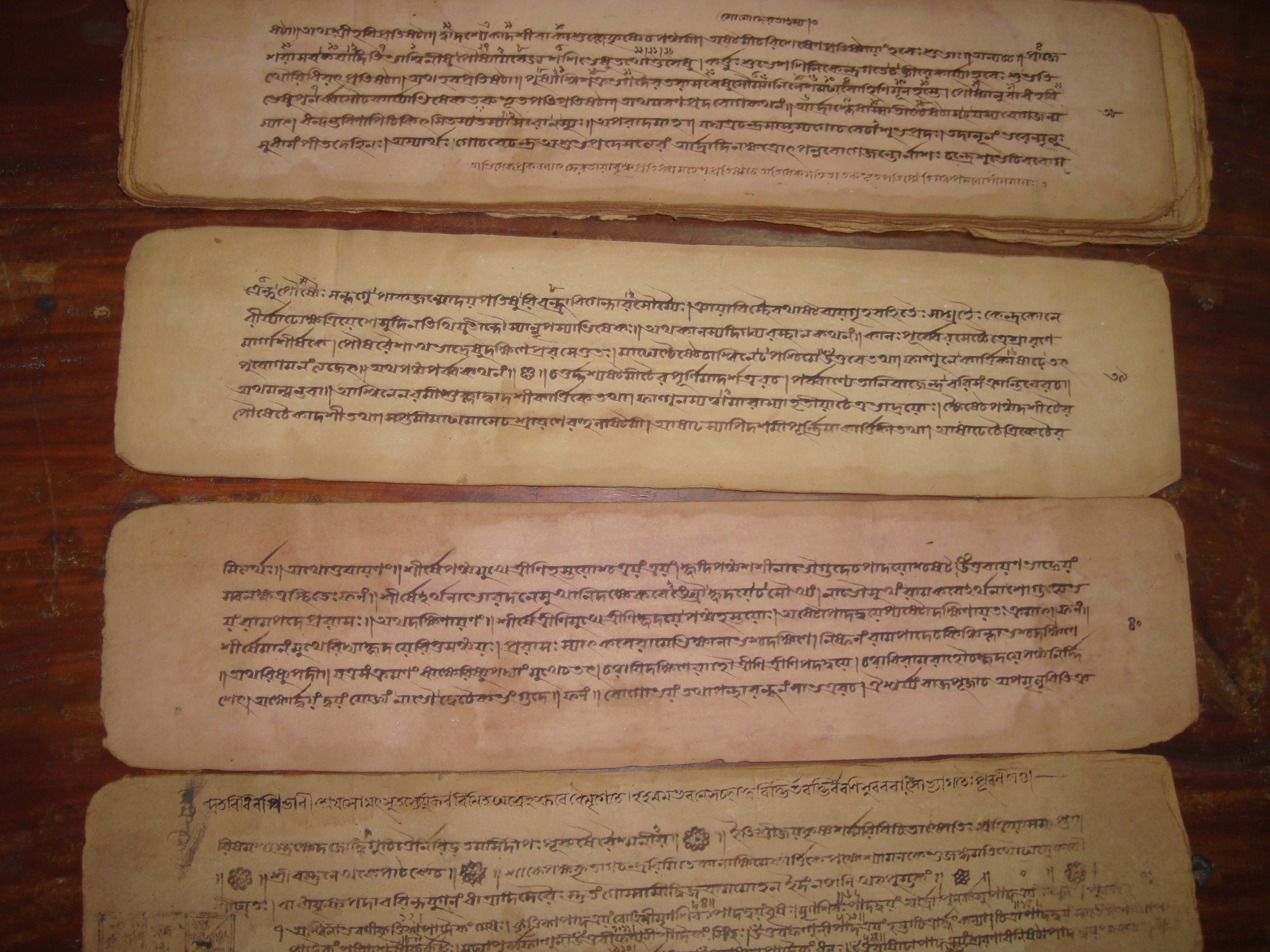
Charyapada manuscript preserved in the library of Rajshahi College.

Chandidas was the celebrated Hindu lyrical poet of this period, famed for translating Jayadeva's work from Sanskrit to Bengali and for producing thousands of poems dedicated to the love between Radha and Krishna such as the Shreekrishna Kirtana. Majority of Hindu writers in this period drew inspiration from a popular Maithili language Vaishnavite poet known as Vidyapati. Maladhar Basu's Sri Krishna Vijaya, which is chiefly a translation of the 10th and 11th cantos of the Bhagavata Purana, is the earliest Bengali narrative poem that can be assigned to a definite date. Composed between 1473 and 1480 C.E., it is also the oldest Bengali narrative poem of the Krishna legend. The Ramayana, under the title of Sri Rama Panchali, was translated by Krittibas Ojha.

=== Late medieval era (1500–1800) ===
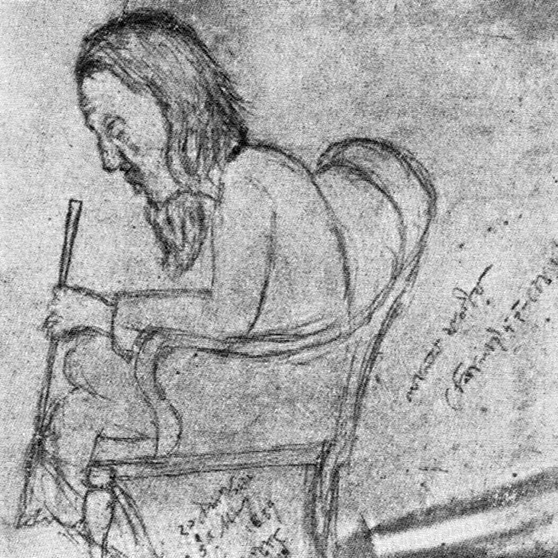
Lalon inspired and influenced many poets, social and religious thinkers including Rabindranath Tagore, Kazi Nazrul Islam, and Allen Ginsberg.

Bengali literature flourished in Arakan following its reconquest. It was home to prominent writers patronised in the Arakan royal court such as Alaol, who wrote Padmavati, as well as Daulat Qazi, Dawlat Wazir Bahram Khan, Quraishi Magan Thakur who wrote Chandravati and Maradan who wrote Nasirnama. Qazi was the first poet under the court patronage. He started writing Satimayna O Lorchandrani, considered to be the first Bengali romance. Teamwork was common in the court, and Alaol finished off Qazi's romance as the latter had died before managing to complete it. Heyat Mahmud, a judge by profession, is considered to be the last poet of Middle Bengali literature.

== Modern (1800–present) ==
The modern period of Bengali literature can roughly be categorized into six phases.

1. First phase: The era of prose (1800–1850). During this time, the Christian missionaries and Sanskrit-educated Bengali scholars worked to induce modernism through prose.
2. Second phase: The era of development (1850–1900). During this time, Pandit Ishwar Chandra Vidyasagar Sashibhusan Chattopadhyay FRGS FRSA and Bankim Chattapadhyay and Michael Madhusudan Datta, wrote novels and poems that exhibit Western influence. These classics remain masterpieces through test of time.
3. Third phase: The era of Rabindranath Tagore (1890–1930). This period was dominated by Tagore's work and other works, especially poems, were subsumed by his influence.
4. Fourth phase: The post-Rabindranath Tagore phase (1930–1947). During this time, many writers made a conscious effort to move away from the Rabindrik influence. This continued roughly until the partition of India.
5. Fifth phase: The post-partition phase (1947–1970). After the partition, Bangla literature started developing separately in West Bengal and East Pakistan/Bangladesh focusing mostly view corresponding with on political and religious identities of each Bengal.
6. Sixth phase: Bangladesh/West Bengal era (1971–present). After creation of Bangladesh in 1971, literature in Bangladesh was invigorated by writers like Humayun Ahmed, who built a new style of writing in simple language appealing to the masses. Around the same time, West Bengali writers like Sunil Gangopadhyay, Samaresh Majumdar, and Shirshendu Mukhopadhyay, wrote with a fresh view of West Bengal in the era of globalization. As popular writers from this era demises, the literature created by the millennial era is yet to be characterized.

=== First and second phase (1800–1900) ===
The first Bangla books to be printed were those written by Christian missionaries. Dom Antonio's Brahmin-Roman-Catholic Sambad, for example, was the first Bangla book to be printed towards the end of the 17th century. Bangla writing was further developed as Bengali scholars wrote textbooks for Fort William College. Although these works had little literary values, prose-writing was greatly developed with the practice of these didactic works. Raja Rammohan Roy contributed to Bengali collection of religious and educational books. As more journals and newspapers were published by missionaries and Brahmo Shamaj, the culture of writing to communicate novel ideals made rapid growth.

Michael Madhusudan Datta's first epic Tilottama Sambhab Kabya published in 1860 was the first Bengali poem written in blank verse. Bankim Chandra Chatterjee was considered one of the leading Bengali novelists and essayists of the 19th century. He also wrote Vande Mataram, the national song of India, which appears in his novel Anandamath (1882). In the 1880s, Chatterjee critically analysed Hindu scriptures such as the Bhagavad Gita as well as the problems of Krishnaism from a historical perspective in his Dharmatattva and Krishna Charitra.

Romesh Chunder Dutt and Mir Mosharraf Hossain are notable for their works of fiction. Girish Chandra Ghosh and Dwijendralal Ray were prominent playwrights of the time, whereas Akshay Kumar Boral and Ramendra Sundar Tribedi are famous for their influential essays. Rassundari Devi authored the first full-fledged autobiography in modern Bengali literature in 1876.

The pre-Tagore era also saw an undercurrent of popular literature which was focused on daily life in contemporary Bengal. The prose style, as well as the humour in these works, were often crass, blunt and accessible. A masterpiece in this regard was "Hutom Pechar Naksha" (The Sketch of the Owl) written by Kaliprasanna Singha, and satirically depicts "Babu" culture in 19th century Kolkata. Other notable works in this regard are "Alaler Ghorer Dulal" (The Spoilt Brat) by Peary Chand Mitra, "Ramtanu Lahiri o tatkalin Banga shamaj" (Ramtanu Lahiri & contemporary Bengali society) by Shibnath Shastri and "Naba Babu Bilas" & "Naba Bibi Bilas" by Bhabanicharan Bandopadhyay. These books arguably portrayed contemporary Bengali dialect and popular society effectively, and also incorporated now-extinct music genres such as Khisti, Kheur and Kabiyal gaan by stalwarts like Rupchand Pakhi and Bhola Moyra. Books like these have become rarer since the emergence of Tagore culture, and the burgeoning preference for literary elegance and refinement in Bengali society.

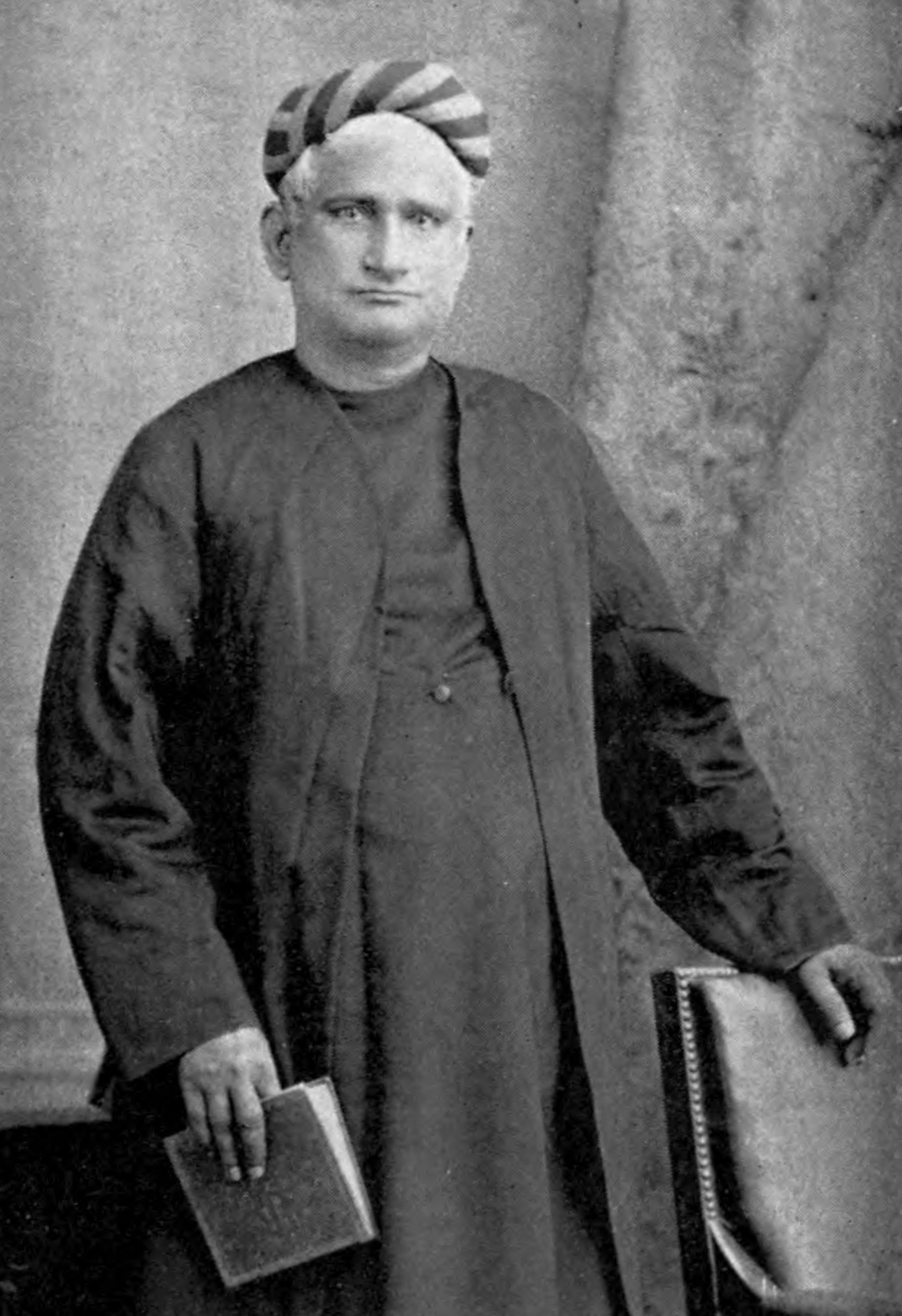
Bankim Chandra Chatterjee's first novel Durgeshnandini was considered a benchmark in the history of Bengali literature.

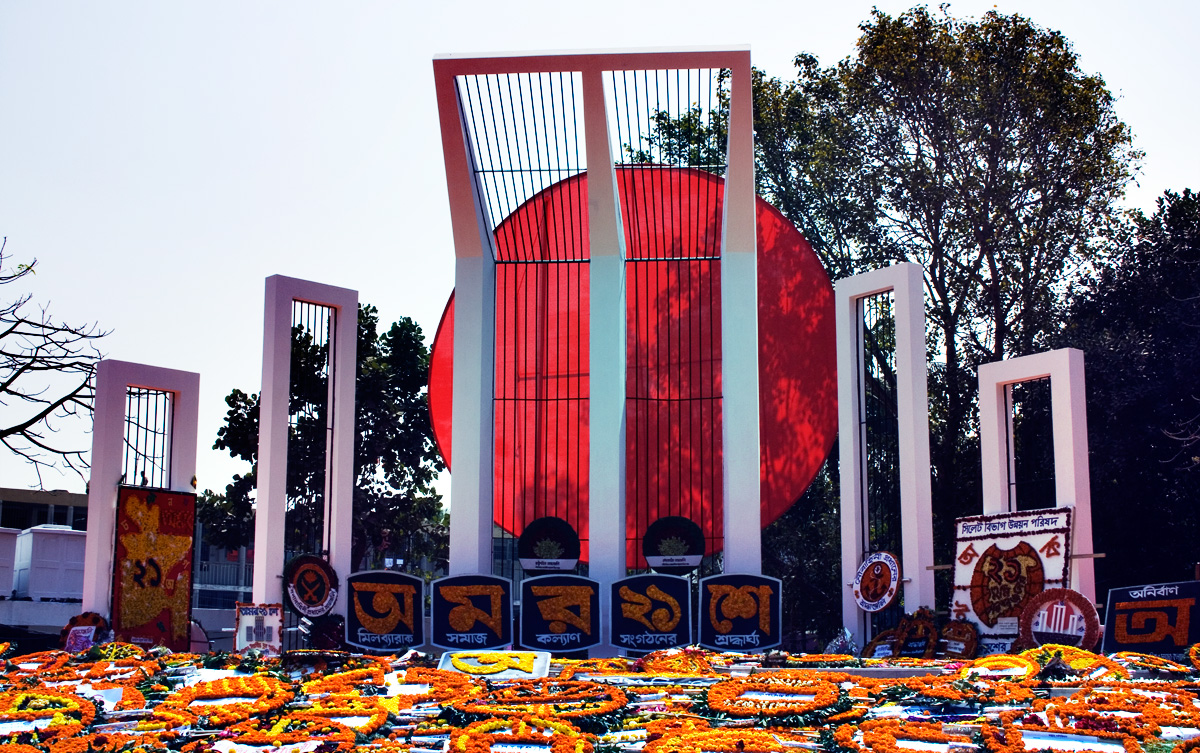
Shaheed Minar, Dhaka as displayed on the annual anniversary of Bengali language movement.

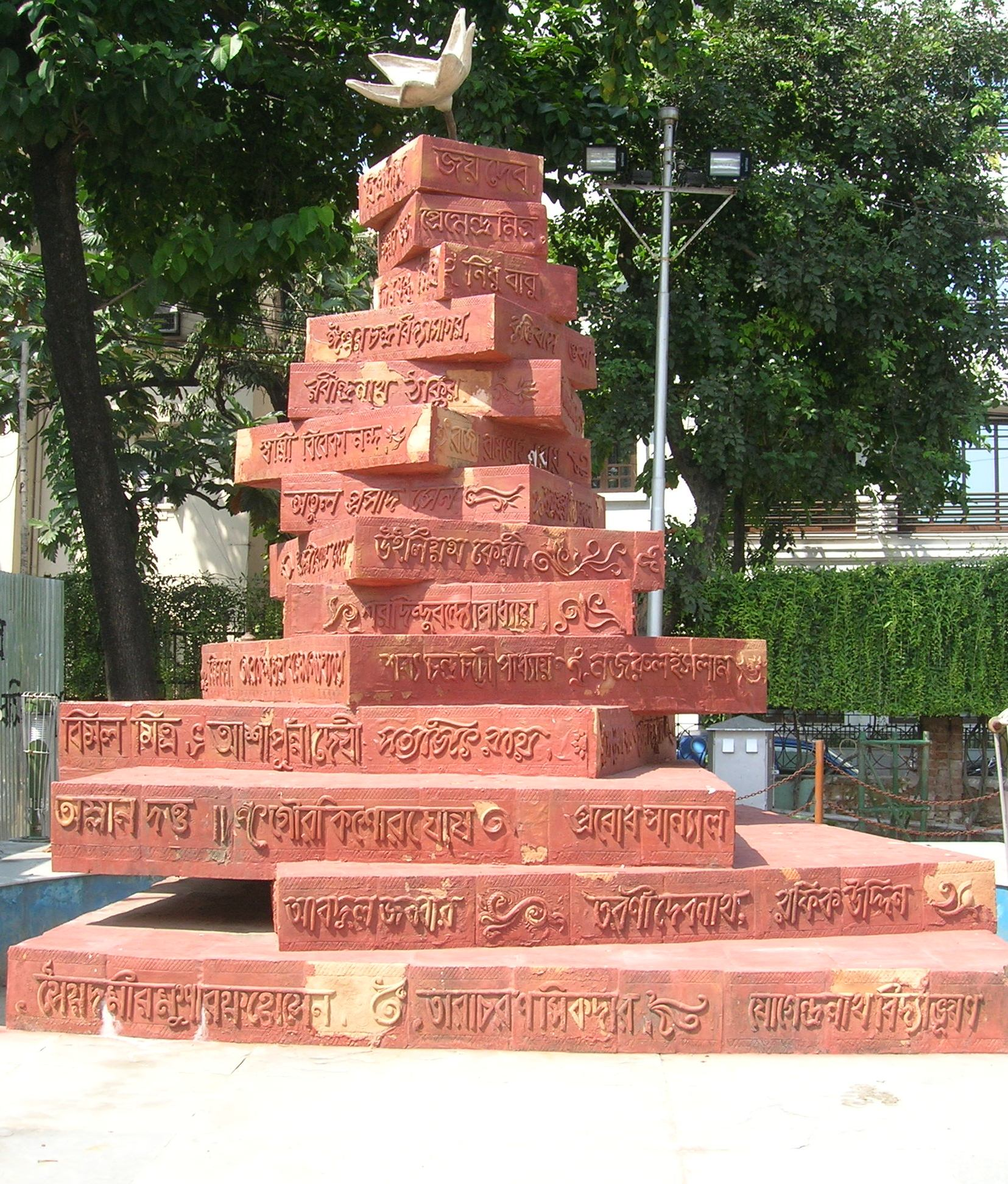
Bhasha Smritistambha, Kolkata.

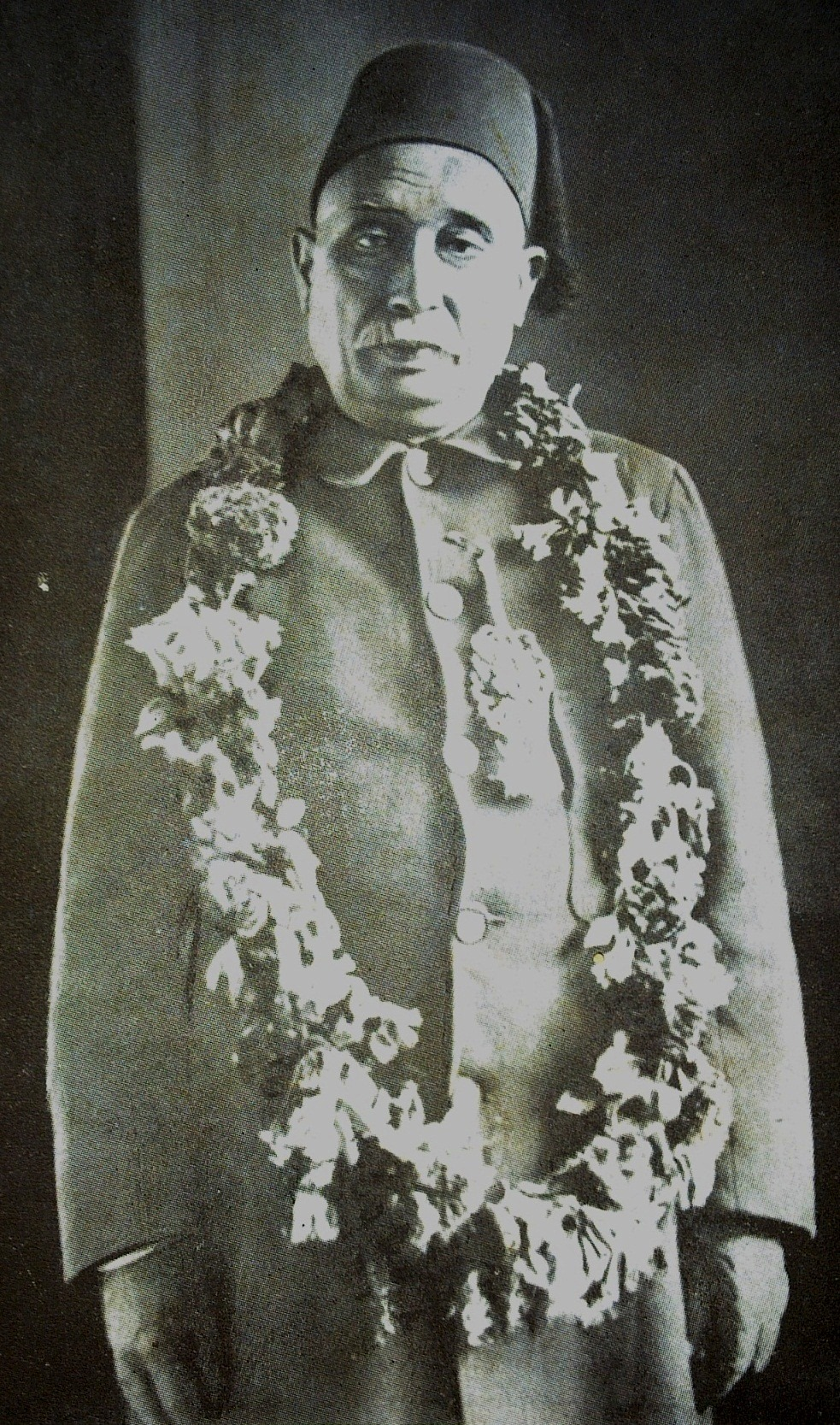
Kaykobad was a popular narrative poet.

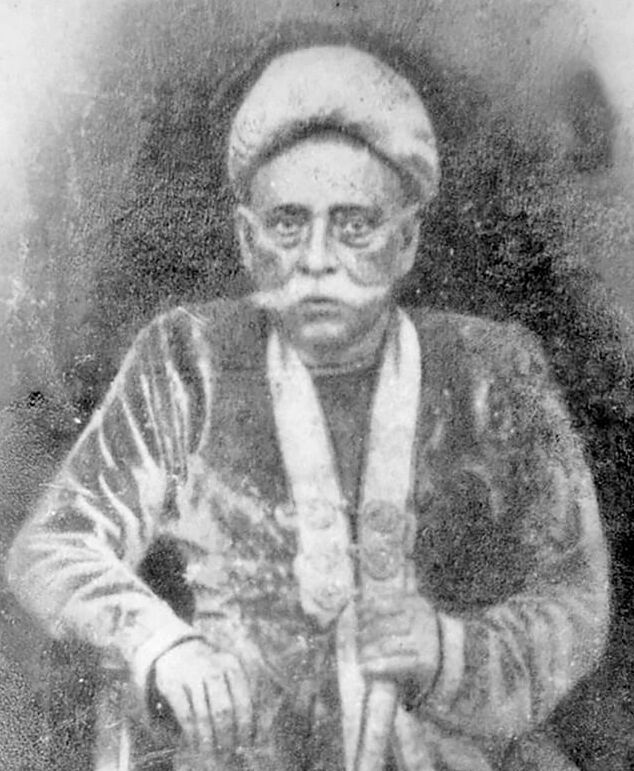
Hason Raja's poetry continues to be prominent in rural Bengal.

Bankim Chandra Chatterjee's Vande Mataram played a vital role in the Indian independence movement, and he is widely respected in India. His novels are popular to a lesser extent in Bangladesh. Bankim Memorial Award is the highest literary award which is given by the Government of West Bengal, India.

=== Third and fourth phases (1900–1947) ===
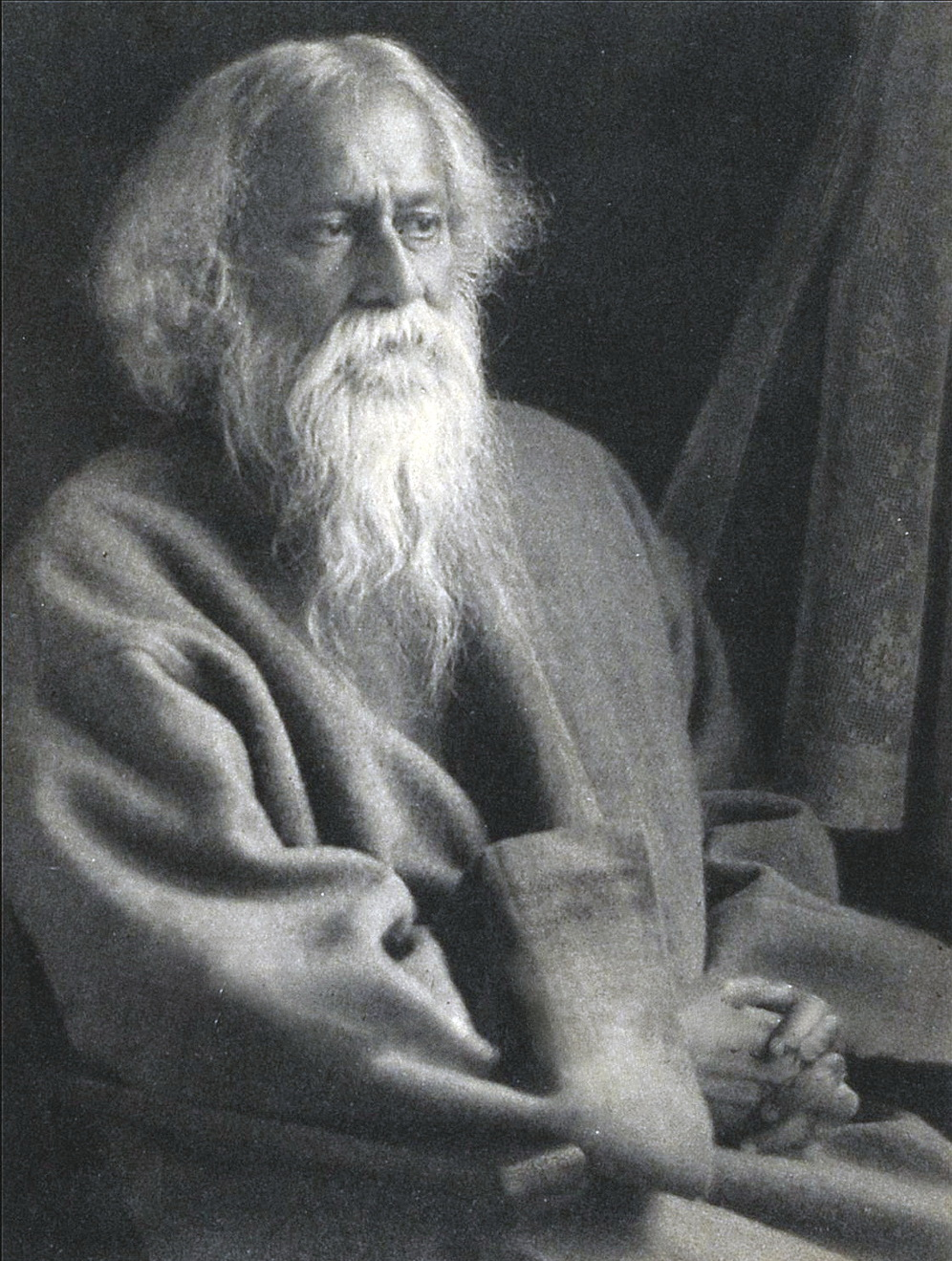
Rabindranath Tagore, Asia's first Nobel laureate.

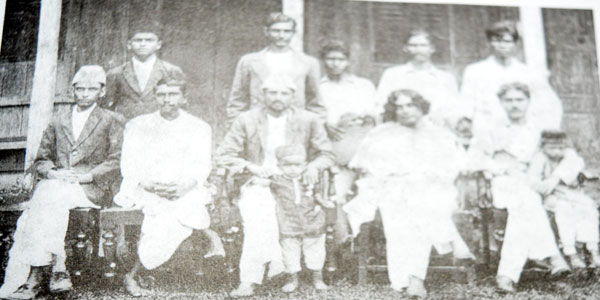
Kazi Nazrul Islam seated with Bengali Muslim littérateurs in Sylhet. Nazrul's contributions included the profuse enrichment of the Bengali gôzôl.

Rabindranath Tagore and Kazi Nazrul Islam are the most well-known prolific writers of Bengal in the 20th century. Tagore is celebrated as the writer of both India's national anthem, Jana Gana Mana and Bangladesh's Amar Shonar Bangla as well as being a source of inspiration for the Sri Lanka Matha. Tagore's short stories are celebrated for their profound exploration of human emotions and social issues. Through characters like Phatik in "The Homecoming" and the themes of class in "The Babus of Nayanjore," Tagore masterfully depicts the complexities of Indian society and the human experience. Similarly, Nazrul is celebrated as the national poet of Bangladesh.

Sarat Chandra Chatterjee wrote novels, novellas, and stories. He also wrote essays, which were anthologized in Narir Mulya (1923) and Svadesh O Sahitya (1932). Shrikanta, Charitrahin, Devdas, Grihadaha, Dena-Paona and Pather Dabi are among his most popular works.

=== Short story writers ===
Bengali literature is also famous for short stories. Some famous short story writers are Rabindranath Tagore, Manik Bandopadhyay, Tarashankar Bandopadhyay, Bibhutibhushan Bandopadhyay, Rajshekhar Basu (Parasuram), Syed Mujtaba Ali, Premendra Mitra, Bengal is also known for its detective stories and novels written by Satyajit Ray, Sharadindu Bandyopadhyay and others.

=== Fifth phase: post-partition era (1947–1971) ===
Rajshekhar Basu (1880–1960) was the best-known writer of satiric short story in Bengali literature. He mocked the charlatanism and vileness of various classes of the Bengali society in his stories written under the pseudonym "Parashuram". His major works include: Gaddalika (1924), Kajjwali (1927), Hanumaner Swapna (1937), Gamanush Jatir Katha (1945), Dhusturimaya Ityadi Galpa (1952), Krishnakali Ittadi Galpa (1953), Niltara Ittadi Galpa (1956), Anandibai Ittadi Galpa (1958) and Chamatkumari Ittadi Galpa (1959). He received the Rabindra Puraskar, the highest literary award of Paschimbanga in 1955 for Krishnakali Ityadi Galpa. Rajsheskhar was also a noted lexicographer, translator and essayist. His Chalantika (1937) is one of the most popular concise Bengali dictionaries, while his Bengali-language translations of Meghaduta (1943), the Ramayana (1946), the Mahabharata (1949) and the Bhagavat Gita (1961) are also acclaimed. His major essays are included in Laghuguru (1939) and Bichinta (1955). Other three well-known authors of that time were Bibhutibhushan Bandyopadhyay, Tarashankar Bandyopadhyay and Manik Bandyopadhyay; popularly known as Bandyopadhyay Troyee (Trio of Bandyopadhyays). Balai Chand Mukhopadhyay, who wrote under the pen name of Banaphul, was another noted author of that period. He is most noted for his short vignettes, often just half-page long, but his body of work spanned sixty-five years and included "thousands of poems, 586 short stories (a handful of which have been translated to English), 60 novels, 5 dramas, a number of one-act plays, an autobiography called Paschatpat (Background), and numerous essays." Saradindu Bandyopadhyay, who was also a renowned historical fiction writer, created the detective Byomkesh Bakshi. Other noted authors of this period included Samaresh Basu, Buddhadeb Bosu, Premendra Mitra, Shibram Chakraborty, Narayan Gangopadhyay, Subodh Ghosh, and Narendranath Mitra.

==== Prakalpana Movement ====
In 1969 Prakalpana Movement originated as a bilingual (Bengali and English) literary movement from Kolkata. It was spearheaded by Vattacharja Chandan, active for over four decades, fostering literary genres such as Prakalpana fiction, Sarbangin poetry, and Chetanavyasism. The movement has featured participation from various international avant-garde writers and mail artists such as Richard Kostelanetz, John M. Bennett, Sheila Murphy and Don Webb alongside Bengali poets, writers, and artists.

=== Sixth phase: two streams (1971–present) ===
==== Bangladesh stream ====
Humayun Ahmed, created his own style of simplistic writing that became immensely popular. His characters like Himu, Misir Ali, Baker Bhai and others continue to be household names loved by many people in Bangladesh and its diaspora. His teacher, Natyaguru Nurul Momen, regarded as the "Father of Bangladeshi Theatre" was the pioneer in simultaneously three fields of literature: Playwriting, belle lettres and satire. Other prominent writers include Muhammed Zafar Iqbal, Humayun Azad, Ahmed Sofa, Selina Hossain and many others.

==== West Bengal stream ====
West Bengal Bengali literature was influenced by a flock of modernist thinkers who steered Bangla literature. Sunil Gangopadhyay, a poet, novelist, and children's story writer, was one of the most prolific writers of his time. Satyajit Ray created his own detective Feluda, who is accompanied by Tapesh Ranjan Mitra, regarded by his nickname 'Topshe' by Feluda and Lalmohan Ganguly. Ray also created the characters Professor Shonku and Tarini Khuro, a revolutionary scientist and an adventurer and storyteller respectively. Additionally, others who left marks include Narayan Sanyal, Buddhadeb Guha, Mahashweta Devi, Nirendranath Chakraborty, Samaresh Majumdar, Samaresh Basu, Suchitra Bhattacharya, Purusottom Kumar Debnath, Nabaneeta Dev Sen, Syed Mustafa Siraj, Baren Gangopadhyay, Amiya Bhushan Mazumdar, Debesh Roy, Atin Bandyopadhyay, Shankha Ghosh, Shakti Chattopadhyay, Moti Nandi, Kamal Kumar Majumdar, Shankar, Malay Roy Choudhury, Haripada Mondal, and Bani Basu.

== See also ==
- List of Bengali Poets and Writers
- List of Bengali-language authors (chronological)
- List of Bengali-language authors (alphabetical)
- Dalit Literature in Bengali
- Bengali novels
- Ghosts in Bengali culture
