= Shahabuddin Nagari =

Bangladeshi poet (born 1955)

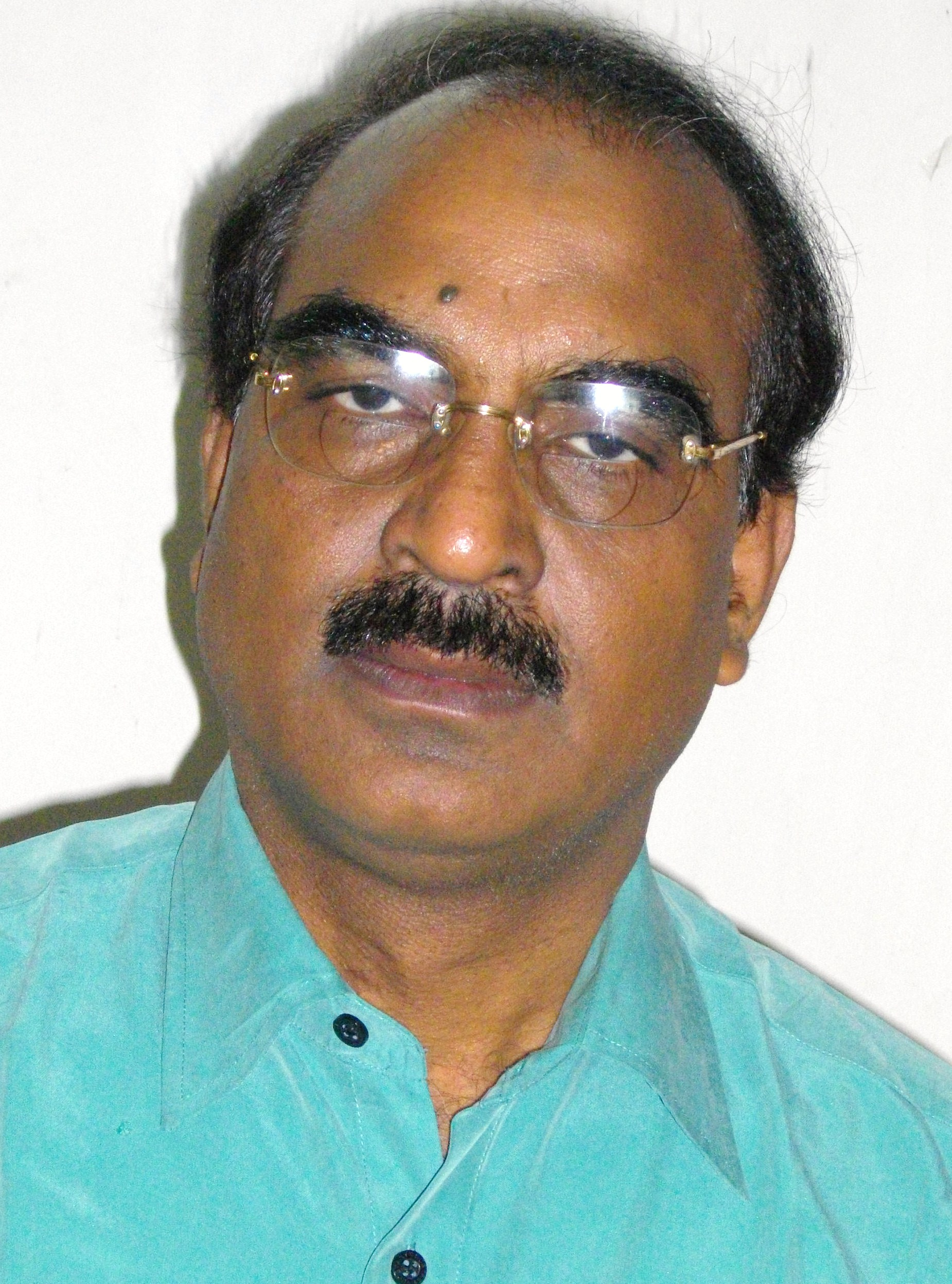
- Bengali poet Shahabuddin Nagari from Bangladesh. 2009.
- Born: Shahabuddin Nagari; 6 October 1955 (age 71); Nawabganj, Rajshahi District, East Pakistan
- Education: University of Chittagong
- Occupations: Poet; juvenile writer; bureaucrat; musician
- Spouse: Dr. Aftabun Nahar Maksuda
- Children: 2 sons & 1 daughter-in-law
- Writing career
- Language: Bengali
- Period: 1970s
- Notable works: Midnight Locomotive and other Poems, The Black Cat and Other Poems
- Notable awards: Kabitalap Award, 2011, CITI-Anando Alo Literary Award, 2012

Shahabuddin Nagari (Bengali: শাহাবুদ্দীন নাগরী; born 6 October 1955) is a modern poet of Bangladesh, who appeared in the 1970s and gained pre-eminence as a lyricist. According to literary critic Abdul Mannan Syed, "Shahabuddin Nagari is one of those few powerful poets of 1970s whose mastery of mixing romanticism with instinct is amazing". As of February 2016, he has published more than 75 titles. Nagari is most noted for his songs and works for the children. He was a senior bureaucrat of the government of Bangladesh. In 1971, he actively participated in the liberation war of Bangladesh.

== Education ==
Nagari started his education in Dinajpur. After studying grade one and two in Dinajpur Bangla School, he got admitted into the Dinajpur Zilla School in grade three. At the middle of his grade five, his father was transferred to Barisal and he shifted with his mother and siblings to his village home. There, after finishing grade five in Shibnagar Primary School, he got admitted into Kansat High School in grade six. After getting promoted to grade eight, he moved with his family to Dhaka. At that time his father was working at the Dhaka DLR & SS Office, Tejgaon, having been transferred from Barisal. After coming to Dhaka, he got admitted into the Rajabazar Nazneen High School. When he was a student of this school, he joined in a movement started in the country against the textbook Pakistan : Desh O Krishti (en: Pakistan : Country and Culture). From this school he passed SSC in 1972. By that time, since his father was transferred to Chittagong, he also shifted to Chittagong and got admitted into the higher secondary class in the Chittagong College. He passed HSC in 1974 from this college. Although he wanted to study English for Honours, he yielded to the desire of his family and got admitted into the Zoology Department of the Chittagong University in 1974. After completing his BSc (Honours) in 1978, he continued in the same department in the Thesis Group for Masters. The topic of his thesis was Rice Field Spiders in Chittagong. He was the only entomologist who worked on spiders for the first time in Bangladesh (1978–80). He finished his academic education in 1980. For some time he worked as a Research Fellow of the University Grants Commission under the supervision of Professor (Dr.) Shafique Haider Chowdhury. Again his focus of research was spiders.

== Family ==
He married Dr. Aftabun Nahar Maksuda (1958) on 9 September 1983 at the age of 28. His wife's paternal residence is in Shalgaria, Pabna. At that time his wife was working as an assistant surgeon in the Chittagong Medical College and Hospital. His wife, having served as a government physician for a long time, was appointed as a deputy secretary to the government of Bangladesh in 2006. At present she is the additional secretary to the government and working in the Ministry of Fisheries and Livestock.

== Career ==
At the beginning of 1981, Nagari joined the Zoology Department of Chittagong University as a lecturer. However, inspired by his father, he appeared in the Bangladesh Civil Service (BCS) examination which he passed successfully and was appointed as assistant collector of customs and excise. He left the university job and joined the government service in the early December 1983. As a government officer he worked in various offices in different ranks and positions throughout the country under National Board of Revenue (NBR) of Ministry of Finance. He has retired from government service since March 2016. He was arrested for murder in 2017 and sent to jail for amassing illegal wealth in 2019.

== Literary career ==
From the very childhood Shahabuddin Nagari has been involved in writing. When he was a student of his village school, he attempted to write some rhymes. His uncle late Abdul Mannan, then a student of Rajshahi University, would come to the village every week (1966–67) and arrange literary gathering. There, the youngest member Shahabuddin Nagari would read out his rhymes. After moving to Dhaka in 1968, he became a regular subscriber of 'Mukuler Mahfil' (The Daily Azad) and 'Kachi Kachar Ashor' (The Daily Ittefaq). About that time he started to send his compositions for publishing. On 30 July 1969, his first rhyme 'Ami Kobi' (I am a Poet) was published in the 'Mukuler Mahfil'. After fighting the liberation war in 1971, he went back to Chittagong and resumed literary activity. When a son of the famous politician late Jahur Ahmed Chowdhury published a weekly called 'Rajanigandha', he started to contribute there. Then he started writing in the children's section of 'The Daily Michhil'. Besides the newspapers of Chittagong, he started to write for children in almost all the national newspapers and magazines of Dhaka. His first book of rhymes Nil Paharer Chhara (1978) was published by the-then famous publishing house of Dhaka 'Muktodhara' (The Swadhin Bangla Sahittya Parishad). He published this book by directly contacting late Chittaranjan Saha, the founder of Muktodhara Publications. His second book Mahakaler Batighar contained articles on literature and was published by Caucus Publishers, Chittagong in 1986. The same year his collection of rhymes Mouly Tomar Chhara was published by Dolna Prakashani of Chittagong.

=== Poetry ===
Nagari is essentially a romantic poet whose focal point of writing is a reflection of his sensitivity. Love constitutes a key component in his poetic thought. Also, a yearning for the past, for social issues and the occasional sadness that encircles human life are also highlighted in his work. The portrayal of Nagari's feelings comes through the exceptionally descriptive. Not only does it paint a vivid picture of his memories, it also allows one to virtually live the experiences Nagari acquired as an adolescent. He writes mostly in free verse.

==== Midnight Locomotive and Other Poems ====
Midnight Locomotive and Other Poems is an anthology of 86 poems by Shahabuddin Nagari, translated into English from original in Bengali by different hands. The culture of Bangladesh and a love for his country is a critical factor in Nagari's writing. This fact is unmistakably etched in the poem, "Our Dreams":

I touch the river, water fills up and it flows to the brim
brim full of water abounds in silvery hilsa
If I look at a barren garden it is full with flowers, rose, marigold, hasnahena
If I dream, Bangladesh also dreams a better future super powers bow down to our dreams.

==== The Black Cat and Other Poems ====
The Black Cat and Other Poems is a new book of poetry of Shahabuddin Nagari. It has been published by Authorhouse, USA in Sep. 2011. Nagari's passion for woman and nature combined is amply demonstrated in a number of poems. His passionate love for his beloved is well depicted in the following lines :

In the mid-night doorbell rang in your door
Soundless movement like soft steps of the cats
Smell of pheromone can be felt from inside the shoe
You didn't understand, put on the shoe, light flickered from it
Sound can be heard of feline steps on marble floor
I've made that pair of shoes with my skin
Under your feet lies my skin.

== Other dimensions ==
Shahabuddin Nagari is a figure in the cultural sphere of Bangladesh. At once he is a vocalist, songwriter, composer, playwright and a script-writer. Considering his enthusiasm for music, his father got him admitted into the-then Pakistan Cultural Academy situated in Green Road, Dhaka. At that time he was a student of grade nine in the school. There Nagari learned both modern and classical music. He was taught modern song by M.A Hamid (now living in the US), late Mahmudunnabi and Mohammad Abdul Jabbar. After the liberation in 1971, he learned music from Ustad Syed Anwar Mufti of Bangladesh Betar, Chittagong. In 1977 he appeared for audition and became a listed singer in Bangladesh Television. A long hiatus from the world of music became inevitable due to studies and job. However, in 1994 he returned to music by singing for the BTV drama Keu Fere Keu Fere Na. In 1995, he developed acquaintance with two famous composers of the country, namely, Subal Das and Pranab Ghosh. In 1996, under the supervision of Subal Das his first audio album 'Bishonno Mon' was published and this gave birth to a new Shahabuddin Nagari. By 2004 he has had ten solo albums published. He has sung more than 200 songs. His Master's Voice (now Saregama) of Kolkata has published his audio CD under the title Premer Gaan in 1999. In 2003 the song 'Bhalobasha Bhag Kora Jay Na' became widely popular throughout Bangladesh. In 2004 he wrote the story, dialogue, script and gave music direction for the feature film Ak Khando Jomi produced by Impress Telefilm Limited. The film was based on his poem 'Ak Khando Jomi' included in his book Aguner Ful Fote Thonte.

== Publications ==
After his debut publication in 1978, a book of rhymes titled Nil Paharer Chhara, Nagari had never looked back. He wrote and published every year. Till date, he has published sixteen volumes of poetry including two in English translation. The count is seventeen for book of rhymes, six for juvenile novels and short stories and four for essays and articles. He has also written one novel and one travelogue. In addition he has compiled and edited with others three volumes of poems and rhymes. His introductory write-up on Bengali rhymes (1947–87) (adopted as the Introduction of Bangladesher Chhara, 1987) is the first research work on Bangladeshi rhymes and recognised as the first reference in our literature. A complete list of his books is given below :

=== Poetry ===
- Bhalobasa Amar Thikana (poem card, 1993)
- Ghatok Tumi Sore Danrao (poetry, 1993)
- Ek Muthote Dukkho Amar Ek Muthote Prem (poetry, 1995)
- O Devi O Jolkonnya (poetry, 1998)
- Korotole Chumu Dey Chand (poetry, 2001)
- Moddhorate Paye Dilam Chumo (poetry, 2001)
- Kobitasomogro (collected poems, 2002)
- Aguner Ful Fote Thonte (poetry, 2003)
- Dorojay Danriye Achhi (poetry, 2004)
- Poems (English poetry, 2005)
- Dule Othe Rupali Chador (poetry, 2006)
- Muchhe Jay Jolrong Chhobi (poetry, 2008)
- Brishti O Jochhnar Kobita (poetry, 2009)
- Premer Kobita (poetry, 2009)
- Joler Niche Jolchhaya (poetry, 2010)
- Midnight Locomotive and other Poems (poetry in English translation, 2010).
- Venge Jay Modhur Peyala (poetry, 2011)
- The Black Cat and Other Poems (poetry in English, published by Authorhouse, USA, 2011)
- Kabitapur (poetry, 2012)
- Nirbachito 100 Kabita (poetry, 2013)
- Jekhane Khonon Kori Sekhanei Modhu (2014)

=== Books of rhyme ===
- Nil Paharer Chhara (rhymes, 1978)
- Mouly Tomar Chhara (rhymes, 1986)
- Rokom Rokom Chhara (joint effort, rhymes, 1986)
- Chhelebelar Din (juvenile poetry, 1988)
- Protidiner Chhara (rhymes, 1989)
- Chhorar Haat (rhymes, 1990)
- Swadhinotar Chhara (rhymes, 1990)
- Rajpother Chhara (rhymes, 1991)
- Ajkaler Chhara (rhymes, 1993)
- Khealkhushir Chhara (rhymes, 1998)
- Nakshikata Chhara (rhymes, 1999)
- Chharar Palki (rhymes, 2002)
- Chharae Jane Lorti (rhymes, 2002)
- Chharar Bari (rhymes, 2006)
- Chharar Ghuri Urouri (rhymes, 2009)
- Kaler Chhara (rhymes, 2009)
- Mojar Chhara (rhymes, 2010)
- Nirbachito Chhara (selected rhymes, 2011)
- Panchmishali Chhara (rhymes, 2012)
- Sat Rokomer Chhara (rhymes, 2013)
- Ajgubi Chhara (2014)

=== Short story ===
- Chhayamanab (short story, 2012)
- Full Shirt (short story, 2015)
- Police Lashti Gum Kortey Cheyechhilo (short story, 2016)
- Akbar Rajakar Hoyechhilo (short story, 2017)
- Je Golpo Jinatke Bola Holo Na (short story, 2017)

=== Juvenile novels and storybooks ===
- Dateline Teknaf (juvenile fiction, 1987)
- Bilu Mamar Gobeshona (juvenile stories, 1993)
- Hulobiraler Hukumnama (juvenile fiction, 2002)
- Kishorsomogro (collected rhymes/poems/stories/novels, 2002)
- Tutuler Monasa (juvenile fiction, 2006)
- Bilu Mamar New Project (juvenile story, 2006)
- Amar Bondhu ABC (juvenile story, 2006).
- Rushi (juvenile novel, 2014)
- Amader Bilu Mama (juvenile story, 2016)

=== Articles and columns and other books ===
- Mohakaler Batighar (literary articles, 1986)
- Shahabuddin Nagarir Column (columns, 1993)
- Naribad (columns, 2002)
- Perekbiddho Kobita O Onnyanno Prosongo (articles, 2010).

=== Travelogue ===
- Kachher Deshe Durer Deshe (travelogue, 2006)
- Hemingwayer Deshe (travelogue, 2014)

=== Novel ===
- Shokun Shomoy (a novel on liberation war, 1988)
- Rupakahinir Jinatporbo (2014)
- Nareegon (2014)
- Kutubuddin (2014)
- Taposhi (2015)
- Punoruddhar (2015)
- Nobboi Seconds (2015)
- Akjon Amla-Kobir Upakkhyan (2016)
- Tarana (2016)

=== Edited anthologies ===
- Bangladesher Chhara (jointly edited, 1987)
- Bangladesher Kobita (jointly edited, 1987)
- Kobita Album (jointly edited, 1988).
- Shudhui Rabindranath (edited, 2010 )
- Abdul Mannan Syeder Nirbachito Probondho : Shahabuddin Nagari Sompadito (edited, 2011)
