= Aju Gossain =

Bengali poet (18th century)

- আজু গোঁসাই
- Born: 18th century Halisahar, Hooghly, Bengal Presidency, British India (today Hughli, West Bengal, India)
- Died: Unknown; Halisahar, Hooghly, Bengal Presidency, British India
- Other names: Disputed; Ayodhyanath/Ayodhyaram Goswami or Ajay Goswami or Achyut Goswami or Rajchandra Goswami
- Known for: Poet, Singer
- Notable work: Keno Mon Berate Jabi; Dubis Ne Mon Ghori Ghori; E Sangsar Raser Kuti; Sadhya Ki Tor Kali Khabi; E Sangsar Dhnokar Tati; Ebar Kali Tomay Khabo

Aju Gossain (Bengali: আজু গোঁসাই, c. 18th century) was a Bengali poet who was known for his parodies of Ramprasad Sen’s songs. Not much about him is known except his works, not even his real name which is presumed to be either Ayodhyanath or Ayodhyaram Goswami, while Jogendranath Gupta assumed that his real name might be either Ajay Goswami or Achyut Goswami or Rajchandra Goswami.

== Background ==
Aju Gossain was a Vaishnava poet and lived at Halishahar in modern-day North 24 Parganas district of the Indian state of Paschimbanga (West Bengal). His father was Ramram Gossain.

Aju Gossain was not only a contemporary of Rampradad Sen but also they both lived at the same village. Gossain took delight to attack the Sen's songs making parodies of them which often resulted dwandwas (a form of traditional musical debate) between the two poets. It is known that Krishnachandra Roy, the King of Nadia loved to hear such dwandwas and whenever he visited Halishahar, Gossain and Sen were called to present musical debates in front of him.

== Works ==
Some of Gossain's best known songs are "Keno Mon Berate Jabi", "Dubis Ne Mon Ghori Ghori", "E Sangsar Raser Kuti", "Sadhya Ki Tor Kali Khabi" which were parodies of some of Ramprasad Sen's most popular songs respectively "Ay Mon Berate Jabi", "Dub De Re Mon Kali Bole", "E Sangsar Dhnokar Tati" and "Ebar Kali Tomay Khabo". Few subaltern stories of Gopal Bhar referred his name often.
