= Akinchan Chakrabarty =

Bengali poet

Akinchan Chakrabarty (Bengali: অকিঞ্চন চক্রবর্তী; c. 18th century) was a Bengali poet. He wrote three narrative poems: Parvatir Sankirtan or Chandir Nutan Mangal (a version of Chandimangalkavya), Shitala-Panchali and Ganga Mangal. He was greeted by the Brahmins as Kavindra ("Great Poet") and lived at Bengaral village near Ghatal in modern-day Paschim Medinipur district in the Indian state of Paschimbanga (West Bengal).

The exact date of his first poem Shitala-Panchali or Shitala-Mangal is unknown. Professor Asutosh Bhattacharya assumed that Chandir Nutan Mangal was composed in the later half of 18th century, while Sukumar Sen believed it was composed particularly in 1757. Akinchan's version of Chandimangalkavya was greatly influenced by that of Mukunda Chakrabarty. This vast work has two khandas (Cantos) further divided into 16 palas (Books). He was, so far known, the last poet of Chandimangalkavya tradition. Ganga-Mangal, a small narrative of Descent Of Ganga composed in 1776, was his last work.

Not much of Akinchan's personal or family life is known except that his father Purushottam lived at Atghara-Srirampur village near Ghatal and Akinchan had three sons: Ramchand, Ramdulal and Shibananda.
