= List of people from Kolkata =

List of notable people from Kolkata. The city of Kolkata has been regarded as the cultural capital of India.

== Writers, including poets ==
- S. Wajid Ali
- Syed Mujtaba Ali
- Sharadindu Bandyopadhyay
- Kumudini Basu
- Raka Bhattacharya
- Suchitra Bhattacharya
- Sukanta Bhattacharya
- Buddhadeva Bose
- Amiya Chakravarty
- Bankim Chandra Chatterjee
- Shakti Chattopadhyay
- Nirad C. Chaudhuri
- Pramatha Chaudhuri
- Upendrakishore Ray Chowdhury
- Dinesh Das
- Jibanananda Das
- Henry Louis Vivian Derozio
- Bishnu Dey
- Michael Madhusudan Dutt
- Satyendranath Dutta
- Sudhindranath Dutta
- Sunil Gangopadhyay
- Joy Goswami
- Gulzar
- Asit Kumar Haldar
- Amelia Horne
- Kazi Nazrul Islam
- Sisir Kumar Maitra
- Binoy Majumdar
- Mohitlal Majumdar
- Samaresh Majumdar (b.1944)
- Arun Mitra
- Dinabandhu Mitra
- Premendra Mitra
- Mimi Mondal, First Indian English writer who nominated for Hugo Award.
- Dhan Gopal Mukerji
- Shirshendu Mukhopadhyay
- Shobhanasundari Mukhopadhyay, Shovana Devi Tagore, folklorist
- Subhas Mukhopadhyay
- Purnendu Pattrea
- Christopher Raja
- Annada Shankar Ray
- Dwijendralal Ray
- Sukumar Ray
- Tarapada Roy
- Samar Sen
- Badal Sircar, dramatist and theatre director
- Srijato
- Rabindranath Tagore, 1st non-European to win a Nobel Prize

== Philosophers and religious teachers ==
The most famous religious figure of Kolkata is Mother Teresa. Others are (in order of surname):

- Bhakti Hridaya Bon (1901–1982)
- Bhakti Prajnan Keshava (1898–1968)
- Boro Maa, (1918–2019)
- A. C. Bhaktivedanta Swami Prabhupada (1896–1977), founder of the International Society for Krishna Consciousness (ISKCON)
- Ramakrishna (1836–1886)
- Raja Ram Mohan Roy (1772–1833)
- Bhaktisiddhanta Sarasvati (1874–1837), founder of Gaudiya Math
- Keshub Chandra Sen (1838–1884)
- Debendranath Tagore (1817–1905)
- Bhaktivinoda Thakur (1838–1914)
- Swami Vivekananda (1863–1902)
- Paramahansa Yogananda (1893-1952)

== Engineers and scientists ==
- James Atkinson (1780–1852), surgeon, artist and Persian scholar
- Ananda S. Bandyopadhyay, Deputy Director - Polio at the Gates Foundation
- Sanghamitra Bandyopadhyay (born 1968), computer scientist
- R. D. Banerji, archaeologist
- Debendra Mohan Bose (1875–1975), physicist
- Sir Jagadish Chandra Bose (1858–1937), Bengali polymath, physicist, biologist, biophysicist, botanist and archaeologist
- Satyendra Nath Bose (1894–1974), physicist and polymath from Bengal
- Upendranath Brahmachari
- Bikas Chakrabarti (born 1952), theoretical physicist and econophysicist
- Asima Chatterjee (1917–2006), chemist
- Suniti Kumar Chatterji (1890–1977), Bengali linguist
- Sukanta Chaudhuri (born 1950), literary scholar
- Barun De (1932–2013), historian
- Brajendranath De (1852–1932), civil servant and orientalist
- Anil Kumar Gayen (1919–1978), mathematician and statistician
- Tapati Guha-Thakurta (born 1957), historian
- J. B. S. Haldane (1892–1964), British-Indian scientist, known for his work in the study of physiology, genetics, evolutionary biology, and mathematics
- Ananda Lal (born 1955), academic and theatre scholar
- Prasanta Chandra Mahalanobis (1893–1972), Bengali scientist and applied statistician
- R. C. Majumdar (1884–1980), historian
- P. J. Marshall (born 1933), historian
- Ujjwal Maulik (born 1965), computer scientist
- Subhash Mukhopadhyay (1931–1981), physician
- Sisir Kumar Mitra (1890–1963), physicist
- Shehla Pervin, Indian scientist and scholar
- C. R. Rao (1920–2023), mathematician and statistician
- Prafulla Chandra Ray (1861–1944), Bengali chemist, educationist, historian, industrialist and philanthropist
- Rajat Kanta Ray, historian
- Amal Kumar Raychaudhuri (1922–2005), physicist, known for his research in general relativity and cosmology
- Tapan Raychaudhuri (1926–2014), historian
- Meghnad Saha (1893–1956), astrophysicist
- Sir Jadunath Sarkar (1870–1958), historian
- Sumit Sarkar (born 1939), historian
- Susobhan Sarkar (1900–1982), historian
- Tapan Sarkar (1948–2021), electrical engineer
- Ashoke Sen (born 1956), theoretical physicist
- Sukumar Sen, historian of Bengali literature
- Robert Swinhoe (1836–1877), diplomat and naturalist

== Gallantry Awards winners ==
Ashoka Chakra

- Flight Lieutenant Suhas Biswas

Maha Vir Chakra

- Squadron Leader Madhavendra Banerji

== Bankers and business people ==
- Radhe Shyam Agarwal
- Amar Kumar Bera
- P. C. Bhattacharya, 7th Governor, Reserve Bank of India
- Aditya Vikram Birla
- Chandra Shekhar Ghosh (founder of Bandhan Bank)
- R. P. Goenka (RPG Group)
- Radhe Shyam Goenka
- Sanjiv Goenka
- Rajat Gupta (b. 1948)
- Ellis Jacob (founder of Cineplex Entertainment)
- Lakshmi Mittal
- Tiny Rowland (chairman of Lonrho from 1962 to 1993)
- Prannoy Roy (b.1949)
- Nalini Ranjan Sarkar
- Mutty Lall Seal

== Freedom fighters ==
- Sri Aurobindo
- Maulana Azad
- Benoy Basu
- Khudiram Bose
- Rashbehari Bose
- Subhas Chandra Bose
- Jogesh Chandra Chatterjee
- Chittaranjan Das
- Jatindra Nath Das
- Basanti Devi
- Sisir Kumar Ghosh
- Badal Gupta
- Dinesh Gupta
- Matangini Hazra
- Bagha Jatin
- Bipin Chandra Pal
- Sudhamoy Pramanick
- Bidhan Chandra Roy
- Ashoke Kumar Sen

== Arts ==
=== Artists ===
- Sukanta Basu
- Jogen Chowdhury
- Anil Kumar Dutta
- Girindra Kumar Dutta
- Gerry Judah
- Shanu Lahiri
- William Laidlay
- Paresh Maity
- Ganesh Pyne
- Devajyoti Ray
- Jamini Roy
- Sudip Roy
- Samir Roychoudhury
- Paritosh Sen

=== Directors ===
- Nitin Bose
- Aniruddha Roy Chowdhury
- Buddhadeb Dasgupta
- Anik Dutta
- Kaushik Ganguly
- Ritwik Ghatak
- Goutam Ghose
- Rituparno Ghosh
- Sujoy Ghosh
- Farha Khatun
- Tarun Majumdar
- Bibhuti Mitra
- Hrishikesh Mukherjee
- Kamaleshwar Mukherjee
- Shiboprosad Mukherjee
- Srijit Mukherji
- Satyajit Ray, winner of Oscar for Lifetime Achievement in 1992 and considered among the greatest director of film history.
- Bimal Roy
- Shakti Samanta
- Aparna Sen
- Avijit Sen
- Mrinal Sen
- Tapan Sinha

=== Cinema personalities ===
- Kajal Aggarwal
- Mirza Abbas Ali
- Varsha Ashwathi
- Abhishek Bachchan
- Amitabh Bachchan
- Bhanu Banerjee
- Karuna Banerjee
- Subir Banerjee
- Victor Banerjee, actor
- Tamannaah Bhatia
- Anirban Bhattacharya
- Antara Biswas, actress
- Chhabi Biswas
- Mimi Chakraborty, actress, producer and politician
- Mithun Chakraborty, actor, dancer and TV personality
- Barun Chanda
- Abhishek Chatterjee
- Anil Chatterjee
- Arpita Chatterjee, actress and TV personality; wife of Prosenjit Chatterjee
- Biswajeet Chatterjee, actor, producer, director and politician
- Dhritiman Chatterjee, actor
- Moushumi Chatterjee
- Prosenjit Chatterjee, actor, producer and TV personality; son of Biswajit Chatterjee
- Saswata Chatterjee
- Tapen Chatterjee, actor
- Parambrata Chattopadhyay
- Mahua Roy Choudhury
- Uma Dasgupta
- Yash Dasgupta, actor, producer and TV personality
- Rajeshwari Datta, actress
- Ileana D'Cruz
- Bobby Deol
- Dev, actor, singer, producer, screenwriter and politician
- Kanan Devi
- Kaushik Ganguly, actor, director and screenwriter
- Roopa Ganguly
- Rabi Ghosh, actor and comedian
- Sayantani Ghosh, actress and TV personality
- Sayani Gupta, actress
- Debshankar Haldar, actor
- Nabadwip Haldar, actor and comedian
- Goutam Halder, actor and director
- Nusrat Jahan, actress, politician and former Miss Kolkata 2010; wife of Yash Dasgupta
- Jeet, actor, producer and TV personality
- Kajol
- Akshaye Khanna
- Anup Kumar
- Ashok Kumar
- Tarun Kumar
- Uttam Kumar, actor, singer, composer, producer, director and screenwriter
- Koel Mallick, actress and daughter of Ranjit Mallick
- Ranjit Mallick, actor
- Swastika Mukherjee
- Tathagata Mukherjee
- Tapas Paul
- Sulakshana Pandit, singer and actress
- Vijayta Pandit, singer and actress
- Tejashri Pradhan
- Aishwarya Rai
- Rinku Rajguru
- Razzak
- Hrithik Roshan, actor
- Rakesh Roshan
- Debashree Roy, actress, dancer, choreographer, animal rights activist and politician; ex-wife of Prosenjit Chatterjee
- Jahor Roy
- Sagarika
- Pahari Sanyal
- Aparna Sen, actress, filmmaker and scriptwriter
- Kaushik Sen, actor and TV personality
- Moon Moon Sen
- Riddhi Sen, actor
- Riya Sen, actress
- Raima Sen, actress
- Reema Sen, actress
- Suchitra Sen
- Bonny Sengupta, actor and politician
- Rituparna Sengupta, actress
- Konkona Sen Sharma, actress and filmmaker
- Ranveer Singh
- Monali Thakur, singer and actress
- Ruma Guha Thakurta
- Shenaz Treasurywala, actress and vlogger
- N. Viswanathan
- Preity Zinta

=== Theatre figures ===
- Girish Chandra Ghosh father of Bengali theatre
- Sombhu Mitra, actor and director
- Chitra Sen
- Kaushik Sen
- Rudraprasad Sengupta, actor and director

=== Photographers ===
- Sunil Das
- Sunil Janah
- Benu Sen

=== Composers ===
- Anil Biswas
- R. D. Burman
- S. D. Burman
- Salil Chowdhury
- Sudhin Dasgupta
- Anjan Dutt
- Jeet Gannguli
- Nachiketa Ghosh
- Rupam Islam
- Hemant Kumar
- Bappi Lahiri
- Shyamal Mitra
- Shantanu Moitra
- Pankaj Mullick
- Sashi Preetam
- Pritam
- Jaimin Rajani
- Anupam Roy
- Kabir Suman

=== Hindustani classical singers/maestros ===
- Nikhil Banerjee
- Ajoy Chakraborty
- Kaushiki Chakraborty
- Naina Devi
- Bhimsen Joshi
- Ali Akbar Khan
- Allauddin Khan
- Amjad Ali Khan
- Bade Ghulam Ali Khan
- Bahadur Khan
- Rashid Khan
- Vilayat Khan
- Jasraj
- Ananda Shankar
- Ravi Shankar

=== Hindustani classical instrumentalists ===
- Jyoti Goho
- Sourabh Goho

=== Other singers ===
- Srikanta Acharya
- Begum Akhtar
- Anweshaa
- Shayan Chowdhury Arnob
- Kanika Banerjee
- Debabrata Biswas
- S. D. Burman
- Suprakash Chaki
- Swagatalakshmi Dasgupta
- Kanan Devi
- K. C. Dey
- Manna Dey
- Anjan Dutt
- Geeta Dutt
- Rupam Islam
- Gauhar Jaan
- Hemant Kumar
- Kishore Kumar
- Suchitra Mitra
- Sandhya Mukherjee
- Manabendra Mukhopadhyay
- Pankaj Mullick
- Dwijendralal Ray
- Indrani Sen
- Kabir Suman
- Prashant Tamang
- Ruma Guha Thakurta
- Usha Uthup

=== Contemporary Bollywood musicians ===
- Abhijeet Bhattacharya, playback singer
- Shreya Ghoshal (b. 1984), playback singer
- Pritam (b. 1971)
- Anupam Roy (b.1982), singer-songwriter
- Sagarika (b. 1970), playback singer and actress
- Kumar Sanu (b. 1957), playback singer
- Shaan (b. 1972), playback singer and actor
- Arijit Singh (b. 1987), singer, music producer, recordist and music programmer
- Babul Supriyo (b. 1970), playback singer, live performer, television host, actor and politician
- Alka Yagnik (b. 1966), playback singer

=== Dancers ===
Prominent dancers of the city include:

- Sharmila Biswas
- Sadhana Bose
- Rani Karnaa
- Shila Mehta, classical dance artist, choreographer, teacher, and composer
- Amala Shankar
- Ananda Shankar
- Mamata Shankar
- Tanusree Shankar
- Uday Shankar
- Rajeswari Vaidyanathan, Tedx Speaker, trainer, performer and choreographer

=== Magicians ===
Kolkata is the magic capital of India and has produced internationally famous magicians and performers, including:

- P. C. Sorcar
- P. C. Sorcar Jr.
- P. C. Sorcar, Young

== Sports ==
=== Administration ===
- Jagmohan Dalmiya, sports administrator
- Pankaj Gupta, sports administrator
- A. T. M. Mustafa, East Pakistani administrator

=== Chess ===
- Dibyendu Barua, chess grandmaster
- Sandipan Chanda, chess grandmaster
- Surya Shekhar Ganguly, chess grandmaster
- Deep Sengupta, chess grandmaster

=== Cricket ===
- Deep Dasgupta, cricketer
- Ashok Dinda, cricketer
- Sourav Ganguly, cricketer, former India national cricket team's captain, sports administrator, former BCCI president
- Rohan Gavaskar, cricketer (son of Sunil Gavaskar)
- John Holman, cricketer
- Atiquzzaman Khan, Bangladesh cricketer
- William Laidlay, cricketer
- Pankaj Roy, cricketer
- Wriddhiman Saha, cricketer
- Mohammed Shami, cricketer
- Laxmi Ratan Shukla, cricketer
- Len Stubbs, former cricketer
- Manoj Tiwary, cricketer

=== Football ===
- Pradip Kumar Banerjee, footballer
- Subhasish Bose, footballer
- Sudip Chatterjee, footballer
- Subhasish Roy Chowdhury, footballer
- Narayan Das, footballer
- Usha Rani Das, footballer
- Krishanu Dey, footballer
- Chuni Goswami, footballer
- Pronay Halder, footballer
- Rimpa Haldar, footballer
- Mehtab Hossain, footballer
- Pritam Kotal, footballer
- Sailen Manna, footballer, former India national football team's captain (guided India to Gold medal in 1951 Asiad)
- Arnab Mondal, footballer
- Hira Mondal, footballer
- Syed Rahim Nabi, footballer
- Subrata Paul, footballer
- Gautam Sarkar, footballer

=== Hockey ===
- Richard James Allen, hockey, Olympic(1928, 1932, 1936)
- Leslie Claudius, hockey, Olympic medallist (1924, 1928, 1936)
- Vece Paes, hockey, Olympic medallist (1980)
- Gurbux Singh, hockey, Olympic medallist (1964, 1968)

=== Racquet sports ===
- Dipu Ghosh, badminton, Arjuna Award
- Saurav Ghosal, squash player
- Jaidip Mukerjea, tennis player
- Leander Paes, tennis, Olympic medallist (1996)

=== Others ===
- Manohar Aich, body builder, Mr. Universe 1952
- Arjun Atwal, golfer
- Chhanda Gayen, mountaineer, first Bengali woman to summit Mount Everest
- Jatindra Charan Guho, wrestler
- Norman Pritchard, track and field, Olympic medallist (1900)
- Mohammed Ali Qamar, Indian boxer, Gold medal in the Commonwealth Games.
- Mihir Sen, record swimmer
- Jyotirmoyee Sikdar, track and field

== Nobel laureates ==
Six Nobel Prize winners have been associated with Kolkata:

- Abhijit Banerjee (born 1961) – Economics, 2019
- C. V. Raman – Physics
- Sir Ronald Ross (1857–1932) – Medicine, 1902
- Amartya Sen (born 1933) – Economics, 1998
- Rabindranath Tagore (1861–1941) – Literature, 1913; first Asian to win the Nobel Prize
- Mother Teresa (1910–1997) – Peace, 1979

== Ramon Magsaysay Award winners ==
The Ramon Magsaysay Award, sometimes called "Asia's Nobel Prize", is given "to perpetuate his example of integrity in government, courageous service to the people, and pragmatic idealism within a democratic society." Kolkata winners include:

- Mahasweta Devi (1926–2016) – Journalism, Literature, and the Creative Communication Arts, 1997
- Gour Kishore Ghosh (1923–2000) – Journalism, Literature, and the Creative Communication Arts, 1981
- Satyajit Ray (1921–1992) – Journalism, Literature, and the Creative Communication Arts, 1967
- Mother Teresa (1910–1997) – Peace and International Understanding, 1962

== Others ==
- Samik Bandyopadhyay (born 1940), critic of Indian art, theatre and film
- Tanmoy Bhattacharya (born 1958), politician
- William Carey (1761–1834), missioner and reformer
- Sabarna Roy Choudhury (1570–1649), Brahmin scholar, social and political figure
- Alexander Duff (1806—1878), missioner and reformer
- Manny Elias (born 1953), drummer, record producer; original drummer of the Tears for Fears
- David Hare (1775–1842), philanthropist and founder of many important and prestigious educational institutions of Kolkata
- Madhabilata Mitra, model
- Rajendra Prasad (1884–1963), politician, the first president of India (from 1950 to 1962)
- Amol Rajan (born 1983), journalist and TV presenter, was born in Kolkata but based in the UK
- Romita Ray (born 1970), art historian
- Radhika Roy (born 1948), journalist
- Gayatri Chakravorty Spivak (born 1942), scholar, literary theorist, and feminist critic
- Ishwar Chandra Vidyasagar (1820–1891), philosopher, academic, writer, translator, entrepreneur, social reformer and philanthropist; key figure of the Bengal Renaissance
- Doma Wang, chef
