= Lawho Gouranger Naam Rey (soundtrack) =

2025 soundtrack album by Indraadip Dasgupta

Soundtrack album by Indraadip Dasgupta, Kabir Suman, Girish Ghosh, Tamalika Golder and Souptik Mazumdar
- Released: 23 December 2025
- Recorded: 2024–2025
- Studios: Audio Lake, (Kolkata); Gan Bajna Music Garage, Kolkata
- Genres: Feature film soundtrack, Bengali folk, Kirtan
- Length: 58:12
- Language: Bengali
- Label: SVF Music
- Producers: Indraadip Dasgupta, Kabir Suman, Girish Ghosh, Tamalika Golder and Souptik Mazumdar

Lawho Gouranger Naam Rey is the soundtrack album to the 2025 Indian Bengali-language musical drama film of the same name, directed by Srijit Mukherji. Composed primarily by Indraadip Dasgupta with contributions from Kabir Suman, Girish Chandra Ghosh, Tamalika Golder and Souptik Mazumder. The film is produced by Shrikant Mohta, Mahendra Soni and Rana Sarkar under the banners of Shree Venkatesh Films and Dag Creative Media respectively.

The soundtrack is notable for its exploration of three distinct musical eras: the 15th-century devotional period of Chaitanya Mahaprabhu, the 19th-century Bengali theatre era of Binodini Dasi, and a contemporary 21st-century setting. The album features eighteen tracks, and was released on 21 December 2025 by SVF Music to extremely positive critical reception and hysterical response from fans.

== Development and production ==
The musical production of Lawho Gouranger Naam Rey began in late-2024, following extensive research by Srijit Mukherji and Indraadip Dasgupta into the evolution of Vaishnavite music. Dasgupta aimed to avoid a purely "palimpsetic" sound for the historical segments, opting instead for period-accurate instrumentation.

=== Research and authenticity ===
For the 15th-century segments, the production team consulted with Kirtaniyas from Nabadwip and Mayapur to ensure the rhythm patterns of the Mridanga and Kartal were historically consistent. The 19th-century sequences, which focus on the life of Binodini Dasi, required the recreation of the "Theatre Song" genre. These tracks were inspired by the original compositions of Girish Chandra Ghosh, utilizing a harmonium-led, melodramatic vocal style characteristic of the era. The lyrics have been penned by Kabir Suman, Adi Sankaracharya, Girish Ghosh, Tamalika Golder, Souptik Mazumdar and Narottama Dasa Thakura.

=== Collaborations ===
The album marked a major collaboration between Dasgupta and Kabir Suman. Suman, who collaborated for the third time with Mukherji after Jaatishwar (2014) and Padatik (2024), composed specifically for the character of the aging director in the film's modern-day timeline.

== Musical structure ==
The album is divided into three categories:

- The Chaitanya Era: Dominated by Nagar Kirtan and Padavali Kirtan. It uses traditional instruments like the Bansuri, Khol, and Manjira.
- The Theatre Era: Focuses on the "Babu Culture" of Kolkata. The music is heavily influenced by semi-classical Indian music and the early stages of the Bengali stage musical, especially the Girish Mancha theatrical songs.
- The Modern Era: Features a more experimental sound, blending acoustic guitars with traditional baul-influenced structures to represent a contemporary filmmaker's journey of discovering Chaitanya.

== Release ==
The first single "Dyakho Dyakho Kanaiye " was released on 24 November 2025. The second single "Jagannath Swami Nayana Pathagami" was released on 1 December 2025. The third single "Shey Chole Geleo" was released on 6 December 2025. The fourth single "Lukochuri Khela" was released on 12 December 2025. The fifth single "Hari Haraye Namah Krishna" was released on 15 December 2025. The sixth single "Khawne Gorachand Khawne Kaala" was released on 21 December 2025. The entire music album was launched on 23 December 2025, two days before the film's release.

== Critical reception ==
The soundtrack received widespread acclaim from music critics in Bengal. The Telegraph praised the album as "an archival masterpiece," specifically noting the seamless transition between the ancient and the modern. Anandabazar Patrika highlighted Jayati Chakraborty's performance, stating that her voice "carried the weight of two centuries of theatrical history."

The track "Khawne Gorachand, Khawne Kaalaa" trended on Indian streaming platforms for several weeks, becoming one of the most successful Bengali film songs of 2025.

== Track listing ==
Track listing
No.	Title	Lyrics	Music	Singer	Length
1.	"Dyakho Dyakho Kanaiye"	Girish Chandra Ghosh	Indraadip Dasgupta	Jayati Chakraborty	2:32
2.	"Jagannath Swami Nayana Pathagami (Female)"	Adi Sankaracharya	Indraadip Dasgupta	Jayati Chakraborty	3:36
3.	"Jagannath Swami Nayana Pathagami (Male)"	Adi Sankaracharya	Indraadip Dasgupta	Padma Palash	3:36
4.	"Shey Chole Geleo (Male)"	Kabir Suman	Kabir Suman, Prabuddha Banerjee	Kabir Suman	4:23
5.	"Lukochuri Khela"	Tamalika Golder	Tamalika Golder	Shreya Ghoshal	3:58
6.	"Hari Haraye Namah Krishna"	Narottama Dasa Thakura	Indraadip Dasgupta	Padma Palash	3:50
7.	"Khawne Gorachand Khawne Kaala (Film)"	Ritam Sen	Traditional, Indraadip Dasgupta	Arijit Singh	4:12
8.	"Bawshontokaal"	Souptik Mazumdar	Souptik Mazumdar	Antara Nandy, Sutirtha Chakraborty	3:13
9.	"Nayaner Jawle"	Shibashis Bandyopadhyay	Indraadip Dasgupta	Jayati Chakraborty	5:16
10.	"Madhava Bahuta Minati"	Vidyapati	Indraadip Dasgupta	Jayati Chakraborty	4:18
11.	"Hari Mon Mojaaye"	Girish Chandra Ghosh	Jatileswar Mukherjee, Indraadip Dasgupta	Jayati Chakraborty	2:53
12.	"Re Nirdoye Tumi Ki"	Girish Chandra Ghosh	Indraadip Dasgupta	Jayati Chakraborty	2:02
13.	"Hey Jogotpati"	Girish Chandra Ghosh	Indraadip Dasgupta	Jayati Chakraborty	2:08
14.	"Esho Nidra"	Girish Chandra Ghosh	Indraadip Dasgupta	Jayati Chakraborty	1:04
15.	"Priye Wrini Aami"	Girish Chandra Ghosh	Indraadip Dasgupta	Jayati Chakraborty	1:28
16.	"Nidre Kyano Esho He"	Girish Chandra Ghosh	Indraadip Dasgupta	Jayati Chakraborty	1:15
17.	"Khawne Gorachand Khawne Kaala"	Ritam Sen	Indraadip Dasgupta	Padma Palash	4:12
18.	"Shey Chole Geleo (Female)"	Kabir Suman	Kabir Suman, Prabuddha Banerjee	Basabdutta Chowdhury	4:16
Total length:					58:12

A version from a Sanskrit shloka from the Bhagavata Purana has been sung by Padma Palash, that has been used in the end credits. However, this track was not included in the music album of the film.

== See also ==
- Music of West Bengal
- Baul
- Chaitanya Charitamrita
