= E Tumi Kemon Tumi =

Song by Rupankar Bagchi

from the album Jaatishwar
- Language: Bengali
- Released: 1 December 2013
- Recorded: 2013
- Length: 4:22
- Songwriter: Kabir Suman

"E Tumi Kemon Tumi" is an Indian Bengali song from the Bengali film Jaatishwar (2014). The lyrics of the song was written by Kabir Suman. The music was directed by Kabir Suman, and Rupankar Bagchi was the playback singer. The song fetched Rupankar Bagchi a national award (best male playback singer).

== Release ==
The song was released on 1 December 2013 and was popular among the audience.

== Awards ==
The song brought several national awards. Rupankar Bagchi won his first National Film Award for Best Male Playback Singer in 2013 for this song.
