= Sukanta (disambiguation) =

Sukanta Bhattacharya (1926–1947) was an Indian Bengali poet and playwright.

Sukanta or Kabi Sukanta may refer to:

== People ==
- Sukanta Basu (born 1929), Indian painter
- Sukanta Chaudhuri (born 1950), Indian scholar
- Sukant Kadam (born 1993), Indian badminton player
- Sukanta Kishore Ray (1918–2002), Indian jurist
- Sukanta Kumar Panigrahi, Indian politician
- Sukanta Kumar Paul, Indian politician
- Sukanta Majumdar (born 1979), Indian politician
- Sukanto Tanoto (born 1949), Indonesian businessman
- Sukantha of Kengtung (1912–2003), Burmese princess

== Places ==
- Kavi Sukanta metro station, Kolkata
- Sukanta Mancha, auditorium in Kolkata

== Institutes ==
- Sukanta College, college in Bhangonkhali
- Sukanta Mahavidyalaya, college in Dhupguri
