= Emami =

Indian multinational conglomerate pvt ltd

Emami Group

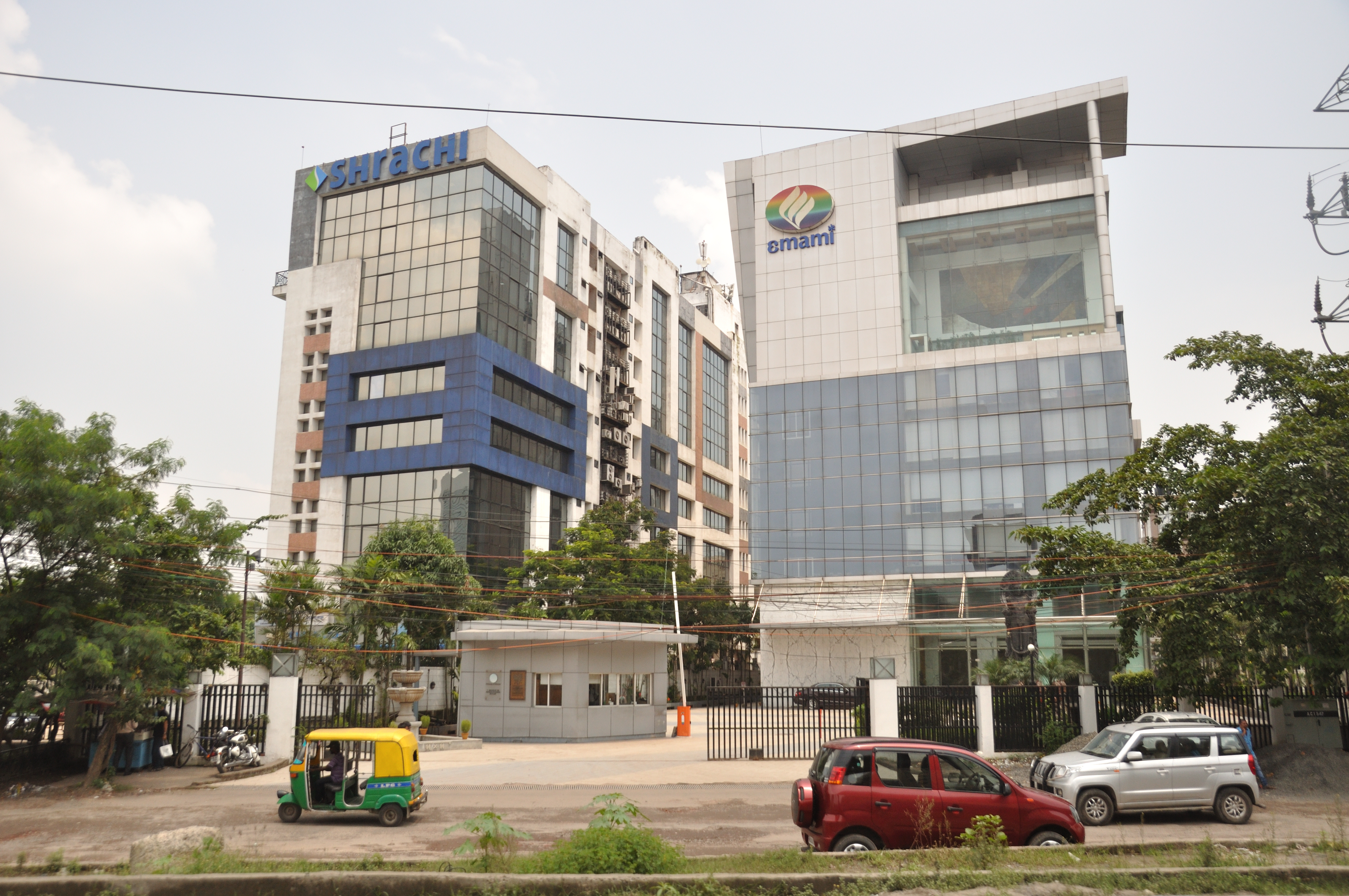
- Shrachi and Emami Tower — the headquarters of Emami Limited on Eastern Metropolitan Bypass
- Type: Public
- Traded as: BSE: 531162 NSE: EMAMILTD
- Industry: Conglomerate
- Founded: 1974; 52 years ago
- Founder: Radhe Shyam Agarwal; Radhe Shyam Goenka
- Headquarters: Kolkata, West Bengal, India
- Area served: Worldwide
- Key people: Radhe Shyam Agarwal; Radhe Shyam Goenka
- Products: FMCG; real estate; healthcare; cement; retail; print
- Revenue: ▲₹37.73 Billion (2025)
- Number of employees: 25,000+ (2020)
- Subsidiaries: Emami Agrotech, Emami Frank Ross, Emami Realty Limited, Emami Art
- Website: www.emamigroup.com

Emami Group is an Indian multinational conglomerate headquartered in Kolkata. The company caters to a number of niche categories in the personal care and healthcare segments.

The company's products are sold across 60+ nations and are available in 4.5 million retail outlets across India. The company has seven manufacturing units across India and one overseas unit. Among its prominent brands is an antiseptic cream named BoroPlus. The company's skin care division generated an overall revenue of ₹2,655 crores in the financial year 2019–20 with an annual profit of ₹639 crores. The total group revenue of the company stands at ₹20,000 crores.

== History ==
The inception of Emami Group took place way back in the mid-seventies, in West Bengal, when two childhood friends, R.S. Agarwal and R.S. Goenka, left their corporate jobs with the Birla Group to set up Kemco Chemicals, a cosmetic manufacturing unit in Kolkata, in 1974. In 1978, it acquired the agri-product company Himani.

The company reported significant growth in modern trade and e-commerce revenues during the COVID-19 pandemic. It also re-launched Navratna Cool Talc and Zandu Pancharishta with a different formulation, packaging and communication. Emami also forayed into the hand sanitiser category as the demand for hand sanitisers shot up due to the coronavirus crisis.

== Products ==
The company's brands include Navratna, BoroPlus, Zandu, Mentho Plus, Kesh King, Fair and Handsome. The company is a major player in fairness cream products for men.

Emami's brands:

| | Category Size | Emami's Market share |
|---|---|---|
| Navratna | ₹1026 cr | 66.4% |
| Boro Plus | ₹645 cr | 74.1% |
| Zandu & Mentho Plus Balms | ₹1262 cr | 54.9% |
| Kesh King | ₹991 cr | 26.6% |
| Fair And Handsome | ₹401 cr | 65.3% |

In 2008, Emami acquired Zandu Pharmaceutical for ₹730 crores. The company merged Zandu FMCG into Emami and raised ₹310 crores through QIP. The company became debt free within 2 years of the Zandu deal. The company's health products unit offers tonics for colds and coughs as well as nutraceuticals.

It forayed into men's deodorant market by launching HE brand of deodorants. Hrithik Roshan was appointed as brand ambassador for HE brand. The company acquired Splash Corporation for ₹200 crore. A German personal care brand Creme 21 was acquired by Emami for ₹100 crores in February 2019. In March 2022, Emami acquired the Dermicool brand from the UK-headquartered company, Reckitt for ₹432 crores (£43 million).

== Shareholding pattern ==
| Shareholders (as on 31 March 2021) | Shareholding |
|---|---|
| Promoter and promoter group | 53.85% |
| Institutions | 36.91% |
| Non Institutions | 9.24% |
| Total | 100% |

== Controversies ==
=== Fair and Handsome ===
In 2007, the company attracted controversy with an advertisement for its skin whitening cream for men, Fair and Handsome. Emami and the star of the campaign, Shahrukh Khan, were accused of perpetuating racism.

In July 2013, WOW a Chennai-based NGO launched a campaign against Emami asking them to remove the Fair and Handsome advertisement starring Khan, saying that it is discriminating against people based on skin colour. The campaign has been supported by celebrities like Nandita Das and Tannishta Chatterjee. More than 22,000 people have signed an online petition launched by them.

=== Hospital fire ===
In the early morning of 9 December 2011, an AMRI Hospital in south Kolkata's Dhakuria district erupted in fire, leading to the deaths of 92 people – mostly critically ill patients, many of them suffocating in their sleep. The following day, the license for the hospital was canceled, and the Chief Minister of West Bengal ordered a judicial inquiry into the incident. Allegedly, the fire was triggered by flammable chemicals that were stored at the site. Rescue efforts were hampered by the narrowness and congestion of the road leading to the hospital, and the allegations that all of the windows and doors were locked and that the fire alarms and sprinklers installed at the hospital did not work during the fire.

Seven members of the hospital's board were arrested the same day, and were remanded to police custody until 20 December by the court of the Chief Judicial Magistrate in Alipore. Among the seven arrested were Agarwal and Goenka, founders of Emami and directors of the hospital chain, who were charged with negligently causing the deaths. Ultimately, a total of 16 people stood accused in the courts in July 2016, including the board members and several directors of the hospital. Amongst the charges were culpable homicide not amounting to murder under section 304 of the Indian Penal Code, which carries a maximum sentence of 10 years' imprisonment in cases where the criminal actions are undertaken knowingly but without the intention to cause death. Additional charges were laid under Section 308 (attempt to commit culpable homicide) and Section 38 (effect caused partly by act and partly by omission).

The fire was recorded as the largest hospital tragedy in India at the time.

== Sporting affiliation ==
- East Bengal (2022–2026)
