= Radhe Shyam Goenka =

Indian entrepreneur and co-founder of Emami (born 1946)

- Born: 19 February 1946 (age 80); Kolkata, India
- Education: St. Xavier's College, Kolkata
- Occupation: Entrepreneur
- Known for: Co-founder of Emami

Radhe Shyam Goenka (also known as R. S. Goenka) is an Indian entrepreneur, co-founder and whole time Director of Emami, a diversified business conglomerate engaged in the business of FMCG, paper, real estate, edible oil & bio-diesel, health care cement, pharma retail, book & leisure retail, solar power and contemporary art. Radhe is among the top 100 richest Indians and listed on Forbes world's billionaire.

== Early life ==
Radhe was born on 19 February 1946 in Kolkata India. Radhe Shyam completed his college education from St. Xavier's College Kolkata. He got his LLB from Calcutta University; and M.Com from Calcutta University. In 1970, Radhe joined the K K Birla Group as head of the income tax department.

== Emami ==
In 1974, Radhe, along with his school friend Radhe Shyam Agarwal, started a cosmetics company Emami. The company was started with a capital of $2600 borrowed from his father. Emami is now a multiple business global group of companies with a revenue of above $1.3 billions.

== Criminal charges ==
In the early morning of 9 December 2011, an AMRI Hospital in south Kolkata’s Dhakuria district erupted in fire, leading to the deaths of 92 people – mostly critically ill patients, many of them suffocating in their sleep. The following day, the license for the hospital was canceled, and the Chief Minister of West Bengal ordered a judicial inquiry into the incident. Allegedly, the fire was triggered by flammable chemicals that were stored at the site. Rescue efforts were hampered by the narrowness and congestion of the road leading to the hospital, and the allegations that all of the windows and doors were locked and that the fire alarms and sprinklers installed at the hospital did not work during the fire.

Seven members of the hospital's board were arrested the same day, including Goenka and Agarwal, who were founders of Emami and directors of the hospital chain; they were remanded to police custody until 20 December by the court of the Chief Judicial Magistrate in Alipore. They were charged with negligently causing the deaths. Ultimately, a total of 16 people stood accused in the courts in July 2016, including the board members and several directors of the hospital. Amongst the charges were culpable homicide not amounting to murder under section 304 of the Indian Penal Code, which carries a maximum sentence of 10 years imprisonment in cases where the criminal actions are undertaken knowingly but without the intention to cause death. Additional charges were laid under Section 308 (attempt to commit culpable homicide) and Section 38 (effect caused partly by act and partly by omission).

The fire was recorded as the largest hospital tragedy in India at the time.

== Awards & Recognitions ==
- 1. Awarded the Cavalier Cross Order of Merit by the Republic of Poland in 2007 (fifth Indian to receive this award).

== Associations ==
Radhe serves as the President of Chemical Division at Gmmco Limited, Advisor of Kemco Chemicals, Executive Chairman at Emami Paper Mills Limited, Joint Chairman of Emami group of companies, Zandu Pharmaceutical Works Limited, Executive Director at Emami Paper Mills, Chairman of South City Project (Kolkata) Limited, Advance Medicare & Research Institute Limited, Suntrack Commerce Private. Limited, Merchant Chamber of Commerce, South City Parivaar Private Limited, Susruta Clinic & Research Institute for Advanced Medicines Private Limited, Bhanu Vyapaar Private Limited, Pro-sports Management Limited, Suraj Viniyog Private Limited, and Emami Realty Private Limited. Radhe had served as an Independent & Non-Executive Director of Khaitan (India) Limited, and Director of Zandu Realty Limited. He served as the Honorary Consul of the Republic of Poland in Kolkata and was the Co-Chairman of the Indian Cancer Society, Kolkata. Radhe is a Director-Member of the Managing Committee of the Merchant Chamber of Commerce & Industry (MCCI).

== Family ==
Radhe is married and has two sons, Manish Goenka and Mohan Goenka and one daughter Rachna Goenka Bagaria. The entire family manages the business of Emami group and lives in Southern Avenue Kolkata India. Rachna Goenka is married to Rajesh Bagaria.
