= Kabir Suman =

Indian musician (born 1949)

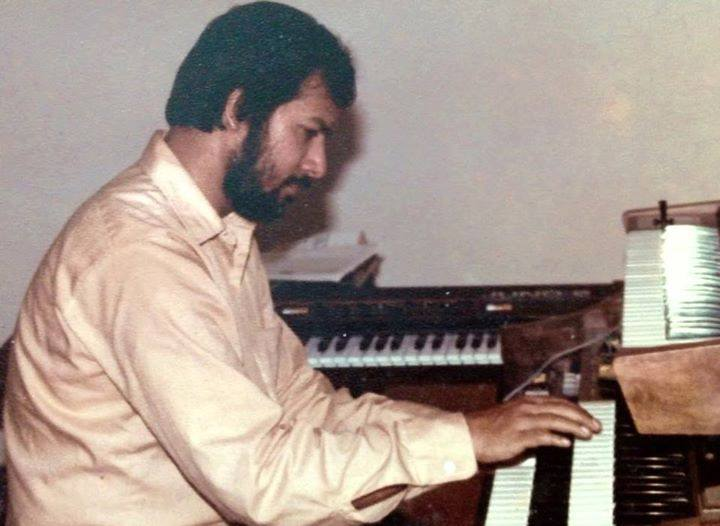
- Suman playing an organ
- Born: Suman Chattopadhyay; 16 March 1949 (age 77); Cuttack, Odisha, India
- Other name: Manab Mitra
- Education: Jadavpur University
- Occupations: Singer-songwriter; music composer; music director; politician; writer; actor; journalist
- Years active: 1972–present
- Works: Full list
- Political party: Trinamool Congress
- Spouse: Sabina Yasmin (m. 2000)
- Awards: Full list
- Musical career
- Also known as: Nagarik Kabiyal, Gaanola
- Origin: Kolkata, West Bengal, India
- Genres: Modern Bengali music; Rabindra Sangeet; Bengali Khyal
- Instruments: Vocals; guitar; keyboard; piano; harmonica; melodica; swarmandal; ektara
- Labels: His Master's Voice; Cosmic Harmony; Bijolpo Music; UD Series
- Formerly of: Samatan, Nagarik
- Writing career
- Pen name: Manab Mitra
- Language: Bengali; English
- Years active: 1972–present
- Period: Modern
- Genres: Column; article; novel; short story; memoir; poetry
- Subjects: music; politics; society
- Notable works: Discovering the Other America, Sumanami, Alkhalla, Hoye Otha Gaan, Mukta Nicaragua

Member of Parliament, Lok Sabha
- In office 2009–2014
- Preceded by: Sujan Chakraborty
- Succeeded by: Sugata Bose
- Constituency: Jadavpur
- Website: sumanami.co.uk

Kabir Suman (Note: pronounced [ˈkobiɾ ˈʃumon].) (Bengali: [ˈkobiɾ ˈʃumon]; born Suman Chattopadhyay; (Note: Bengali pronunciation: [ˈʃumon ˈt͡ʃɔʈːopad̪ʱːae̯].) 16 March 1949) is an Indian singer-songwriter, music director, composer, writer, actor, politician, and former journalist. He shot to fame in the 1990s with Bengali albums such as Tomake Chai (I Want You) and Boshe Anko (Sit-and-Draw). Suman has won a National Film Award for Best Music Direction for his work in Jaatishwar (2014).

From May 2009 to 2014, he was a Member of Parliament of India in the 15th Lok Sabha, having been elected from the Jadavpur constituency in West Bengal, on a Trinamool Congress ticket.

== Early life and musical career ==
Suman was born in a Bengali Hindu Brahmin family on 16 March 1949 to Sudhindranath and Uma Chattopadhyay at Cuttack, Odisha. He started his training in classical music at a very young age, under the tutelage of his father. He studied at St. Lawrence High School, Kolkata. He graduated with an honours in English Literature from Jadavpur University and did a diploma in the French language and the German language.

Around 1968, while learning Himangshu Dutta compositions, he felt that in spite of their compositional strength, they did not represent the contemporary times, lyrically.

Kabir Suman's first studio recording was in 1972. It was released from Hindusthan Records. His second single vinyl record was published in 1973, from the same label. Both these records were commercially unsuccessful.

After resigning from All India Radio he joined a clerical post at United Bank of India. Kabir Suman shifted to France temporarily to teach the basics of Indian Classical Music in 1973. It is said in one of his autobiographies, that in France he was first introduced to the songs of Bob Dylan and he claimed Dylan's songs left a great impression and influence on him.

Kabir Suman went to West Germany on 12 May 1975.. At the end of 1975, Voice of Germany opened a Bengali department in Cologne, and he applied for a job there. They gave him some translation work, and he gradually became a regular freelancer for the Voice of Germany's Bengali division.

In May 1979, Suman returned to Kolkata and he started to work as a teacher of German at Ramakrishna Mission Institute of Culture, Kolkata, and the Max Mueller Bhavan.

He started working in the Bengali daily Aajkal as a part-timer, and also contributed to the Desh until 1980. He joined a band called "Samatan". However, this band was unsuccessful and the members broke up very soon. Some members of Samatan and some new members, all in their twenties and thirties joined him to establish a new band called 'Nagarik : Anya Katha Anya Gan'. During this time Suman completed his first song (written in 1975) "E Kemon Akash Dekhale Tumi".

During this time Suman went to the US in to work for Voice of America. While working for Voice of America, Suman went to Nicaragua during Sandinista Revolution. He also wrote for Desh magazine under the pseudonym Manab Mitra during this time and also started writing in the 'Frontier' magazine.

Suman returned to Kolkata in early 1985. He bought many instruments, applicable for a complete recording studio, which were sent to Kolkata by ship. After returning to Kolkata, he rejoined with 'Nagarik' with some new vocalists and instrumentalists, and continued writing and composing songs, thinking mainly as group songs.

=== Breakup of Nagorik ===
From early 1986, 'Nagorik' started swinging due to clash of personality. Kabir Suman created some songs at that time like "Hariye Jeo Na", "Tomake Chai" (finally published in 1992), "Aro Balo Aro Katha" (partially published in 1992), "Machhi O Mara Mukher Gan", "Najehal Akashta", "Robbar" (finally published in 1994), "Tumi Gan Gaile (finally sung by Indranil Sen and published in 2002), "Ganahatyar Nam Bhopal", "Tirikshi Mejajer Je Lokta", "Abhibadan" (finally published in 1994) etc. His initial compositions were created keeping the group in mind. The group consisted of amateur singers and their aptitude was limited. Members of Nagorik recorded some of his songs on cassette tape, the entire recording was planned domestically in his home at Baishnabghata. Kabir Suman himself had written, composed, sung and played electronic keyboard on the recording. There were some other vocalists and instrumentalists, instruments included guitar and percussions. The entire recording was done by his four track tape recorder, where live vocals and live instruments were recorded in two tracks by all vocalists, and Kabir Suman himself added more electronic sounds on the rest of the two tracks by playing synthesizer. His book "Mukta Nicaragua" about Sandinista revolution was published by K.P. Bagchi Publication at that time (republished many years later), but another book "Anya America" failed to get published. He also recorded some information and song about Sandinista Revolution at that time. During this time he constructed a recording studio named 'Sing To Live' inside an abandoned factory near Bansdroni.

=== 1986–1989: In West Germany ===
Kabir Suman was not sure about the future of his created songs, and also not interested to involve in a general job. He thought if he could go to a foreign country as an employee, he could buy many electronic music instruments. Thinking thus, he went to West Germany again in September 1986, and before departure he recorded another album of 'Nagarik', following the procedure just written before, but this time in the new studio he constructed.

==== Learning guitar ====
Suman returned to Kolkata in early 1989. He bought many instruments like before, this time both keyboard and guitar.

=== Struggling as a newcomer musician ===
After returning to Kolkata, he saw 'Nagarik' has almost disbanded because of ego-clash, and the studio is also in a sinking mood. He decided to be a solo professional singer-songwriter and musician, and thought to work in some advertisement business, but nothing materialized. During this time he wrote some songs like "Tin Shataker Shahar", "Chena Duhkha Chena Sukh" (finally published in 1992), "Pratham Sabkichhu" (finally published in 1994) etc.

==== First public performance with own song ====
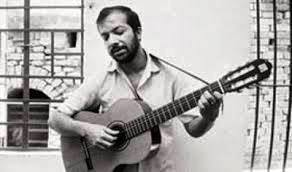
Kabir Suman in his rented flat at Bhabanipur

He felt nervous because he was performing on stage after 17 years, and he was completely unknown, with his style. He sang "Tin Shataker Shahar" with guitar, then "Tomake Chai" and finally "Amader Janya" – both with electronic keyboard. The audiences became highly appreciative about his songs and music after hearing three songs and started applauding seeking encore. Kabir Suman felt very happy to realize that his song got the favour of the general public, and became optimistic. He started to practise his voice with the help of electronic tanpura, continued keyboard and guitar playing, and also creating songs with some contemporary incidents. Kabir Suman performed first time as a professional singer in December 1990. He got appreciation from Dr. Barin Roy, Gour Kishor Ghosh, Ashis Chattopadhay etc. Shubhendu Maity helped him by giving him a chance to perform in some concerts. His songs have not impressed the rural people, but urban and suburban people appreciated them very much. He also sang at some political meetings of the Communist Party of India (Marxist). During this time some controversy arose over one of his songs "Anita Dewan".

==== Solo live performance ====
But although those reviews were positive, not many invitations other from than his friend circle happened. He performed in some live programs with the help of his friends. All those were very unsure, and Kabir Suman also was not optimistic at that time about his eligibility. Many people of advertisement business got him to do jingles or theme songs including "Lexpo 1991", but some of them either gave him not a single penny, others gave him very little money, despite the fact that Kabir Suman made all this work completely alone with writing, composing, singing, playing instruments, recording, and mixing. Some advised him to go to Mumbai for some professional work, but he refused it.

He went to Doordarshan Kendra Kolkata for some work, but he was refused. He went to Akashbani Bhawan Kolkata, and applied with the help of his friend and famous newsreader Tarun Chakrabarty. Ultimately he sang some of his own songs and some songs of Rabindra Nath Tagore, after 16 years, on the radio. In 1991 he went to film director Tarun Majumdar for some work in soundtrack. Tarun Majumder listened to some of his songs, and selected "Pratham Sabkichhu" to use in one of his upcoming films 'Abhimane Anurage', although he requested Suman to change some of his lyrics to match with the theme of that movie. The song was recorded in February 1992. Kabir Suman himself played guitar, Pratap Roy played synthesizer, and Samir Khasnabis played bass guitar. Unfortunately the film was not completed, and so the song was also not released.

==== First solo album ====
Shubhendu Maity told Mr. Somnath Chattopadhyay, one of the officials of The Gramophone Company of India about the songs of Kabir Suman, and after Shubhendu's request, Suman sent some songs to Somnath after home recording. Ravi Kichlu, the head of the product development division of that company welcomed Suman, and showed interest to record his songs. Kabir suman felt very happy and surprised after listening to this, and asked Ravi about the reason for it, Ravi Kichlu told him – "I will be doing a service to Indian Music". The recording started after some days in early 1992.

=== Musical life ===
He released his first solo album, Tomake Chai, on 23 April 1992, which was immensely successful as it redefined Bengali songs. Later Suman stopped making songs for general audience and focused on more political issues.

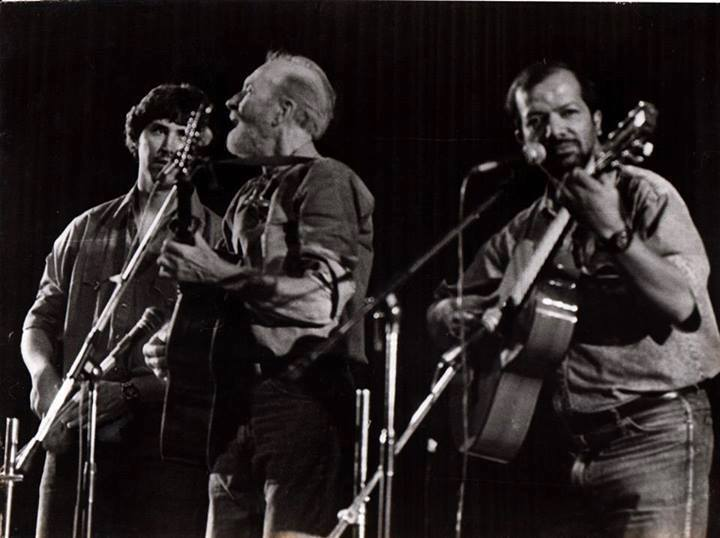
Kabir Suman performed with Pete Seeger at Kolkata in 1996.

==== Digital songs ====
Since 2011, Kabir Suman started posting his new songs on his website. During this time his 19th album '63te' was released as compact disc format, which contained some songs that were also published on his website. After that, he started completely releasing his new songs (as mostly audio format, sometimes as video format) through his website. Sometimes he releases some songs also through SoundCloud. All his internet-only songs are only playable, but not downloadable. It does not cost any money for listening those songs. It is first such example for a Bengali musician to release songs only in internet. Beside his self-created songs, he also released some Indian Classical songs and some old songs, created by late Dilip Kumar Roy and others.

==== Present status ====
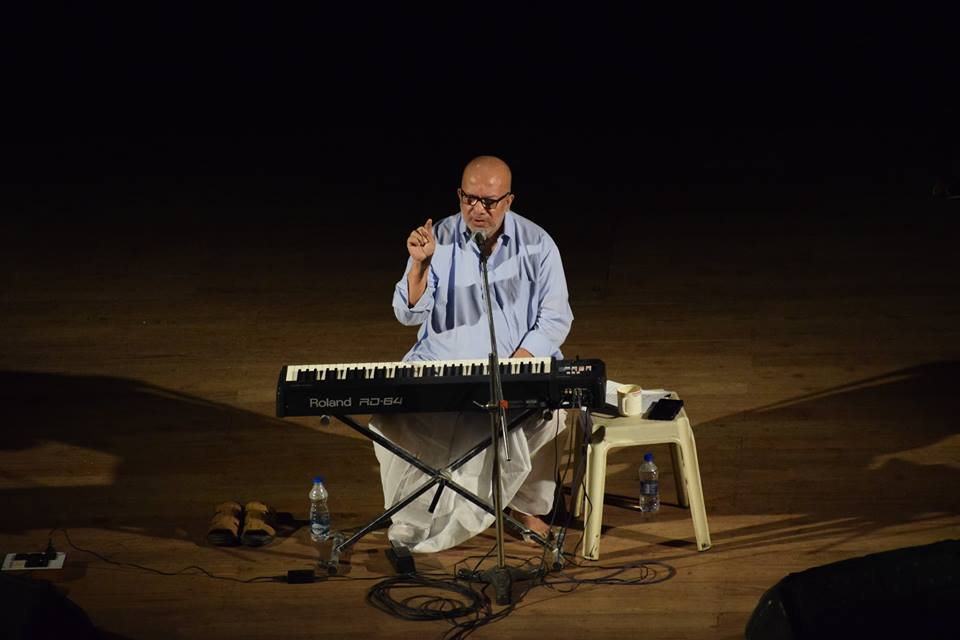
Kabir suman is on stage in May 2017

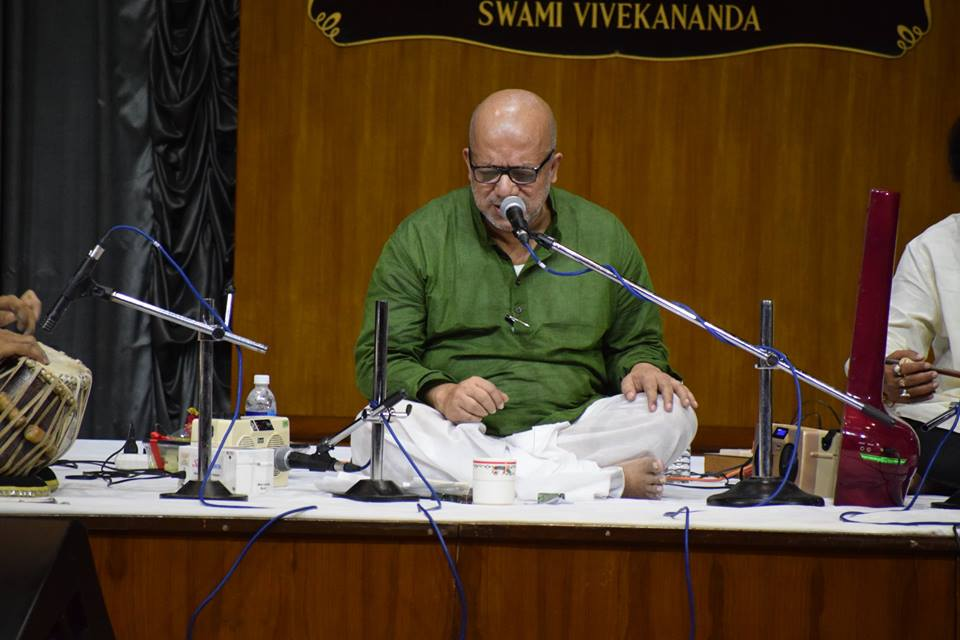
Kabir Suman is one of the very few recent musicians who performs frequently Bangla Khayal on stage.

Although he has not recorded any studio album since 2012 (actually his last recording in a professional recording studio occurred in 2008, since when he has recorded his studio albums entirely at his home), he has recently recorded two soundtrack albums in 2014 and 2016. He is continuing live performance on various stages in Kolkata and various towns in West Bengal as of 2017. He also sometimes performs live in some cities outside West Bengal, including both Indian and foreign cities, even outside of Asia. He also teaches songs in his house on weekends. Despite not being completely physically fit due to some nerve problems, he still performs a three-hour solo live performance, playing electronic keyboard (now simply an acoustic piano). Until recently, he played the guitar. He also sometimes plays melodica and harmonica at his concerts. Since 2013, he took some additional musicians in his concerts for playing additional acoustic guitar and electronic percussion/tabla.

== Political activities ==
Suman was a journalist in Nicaragua during the Sandinista revolution and wrote Mukto Nicaragua (Liberated Nicaragua) on his experiences. During the 2002 Gujarat riots, he composed songs in protest against fundamentalism. He is also noted for his strong declamations against political opponents in public. Since 2006, when Suman was involved in the land struggle in Nandigram, he started aligning himself to Trinamool Congress. His songs on the Nandigram land issues have been released on two albums, Nandigram and Pratirodh. Suman participated in the Singur agitation & other TMC party programmes on a regular basis.

The TMC nominated him for the 2009 general election from Jadavpur constituency in West Bengal, and won the election, defeating his nearest rival, Sujan Chakraborty of the CPI(M).

In November 2009, Suman had a dispute with the TMC. He complained that the local leaders of the party were not allowing him to work, and his views were not taken seriously in the party. However, the issue was resolved amicably in a series of closed door meetings.

Suman has also been vocal in his support for the movement of tribals in Lalgarh, and has composed an album called Chhatradharer Gaan in support of the mass movement, going against the wishes of the party. Going against the party position, he has also expressed his protests against "Operation Green Hunt", the Indian Government's military operation where the Naxalites have some influence.

Suman, at the end of March 2010, claimed that he is going to leave Trinamool Congress and also his membership of the Parliament. On the request of Mahasweta Devi he postponed his resignation for seven days. Within a few days, however, he made a U-turn and declared on 7 April that he does not want to resign, to prevent embarrassing the party further. Currently, he conveys his political opinions through his own website.

== Personal life ==
Suman was born in a Hindu Brahmin family. He converted to Islam in 1999 to mark his protest against the killing of Christian missionary Graham Staines by a former member of Bajrang Dal. Despite having converted to Islam, Suman describes himself as agnostic and nihilist-anarchist "of an academic sort." When questioned about his religious beliefs in 2007, he replied: "If there was a God, there wouldn't be cruelty to animals and children."

Suman, whose birth name was Suman Chattopadhyay, changed his name to "Kabir Suman" post-conversion. According to him, "I wanted to keep the name my parents gave me, so I kept Suman. I took the name Kabir after Sheikh Kabir, a Bengali Muslim poet who wrote Baishnab Padabali."

Suman married five times in his lifetime, but he says that he does not believe in the institution of marriage: "Marriage is another form of bondage. I wish I hadn't done it so many times." His present wife, since 2000, is Sabina Yasmin, a Bangladeshi singer.

== Discography and other work ==
=== Solo albums ===
==== Tomake Chai (1992) – His Master's Voice ====
- Tomake Chai
- Petkati Chadiyal
- Tui Heshe Uthlei
- Kokhono Somay Ashe
- Jodi Bhabo Kinchho Amay
- Haal Chherona Bondhu
- Tin Taler Gaan
- Chena Dukkho Chena Sukh
- Mon Kharap Kora Bikel
- Pagol
- Dosh Foot by Dosh Foot
- Amader Jonno

==== Boshe Aanko (1993) – His Master's Voice ====
- Boshe Aanko
- Surjo Bollo Ish
- Ek Muhurte Phiriye Dile
- Sakal Belar Roddur
- Hathat Rastay
- Rekhaber Roop
- Meghdoot
- Ek Ekta din
- Chalser Gaan
- Jomi Bechar Taka
- Bharsa Thakuk
- Khata Dekhey Gan Geona

==== Ichchhe Holo (1993) – His Master's Voice ====
- Banshuriya
- Ichchhe Holo
- Jage Jage Raat
- Boyesh Amar Mukher Rekhay
- Tini Briddha Holen
- Danpite
- Tomar Tulona
- Magoje Curfew
- Majh Rattire Chnader Kaste
- Nabab Nababi Kore
- Uttoro to Jana
- Protidin Surjyo Othe
- Arun Mitra
- Agun Dekhechhi Ami

==== Gaanola / Suman the One Man Band (1994) – His Master's Voice / EMI ====
- Tomake Bhababoi
- Gaanola
- Abhibadan / Priyotama
- Abchhayatai Lagchhe Bhalo
- Prothom Shobkichhu
- Shararat Jolechhe Nibir
- Bibhuti Bhusan
- Jato Dure
- Nodir Galpo
- Tomar Sange Eka
- Robbar
- Brigade-e Meeting
- Tomar Kothar Rang
- Cactus
- Gaan Tumi Hao

==== Ghumou Baundule (1995) – His Master's Voice ====
- Tomake Dekhechhi
- Parar Chhotto Park
- Themey Jete Jete
- Bedcoverer Prante
- Ghumao Baundule
- Jhograr Gaan
- Papri Dey
- Bhagoban Kato Bhalo
- Gachher Tolay
- Stabdhotar Gaan
- Ichchhe Kore
- Pakhita
- Sanjib Purohit Haatlen

==== Chaichhi Tomar Bondhuta (1996) – His Master's Voice ====
- Amar Mato Kalo
- Amar Premer Gaan
- Byangoma
- Chaichhi Tomar Bondhuta
- Ekla Hote Chaichhe Akash
- Ektur Jonyo
- Ekushe February
- Hirer Angti
- How is That
- Knadte De
- Roddurer Gaan
- Sabdhan
- Sahoshilpira Esho
- Sesh Picasso
- Thomke Achhe

==== Jatishwar (1997) – His Master's Voice ====
- Ami Chai
- Biday Porichita
- Buker Bhetor Brishti Pore
- Char Line
- Helicopter
- Janalar Knache
- Jatishwar
- Nayantara
- Notay
- Sahore Brishti
- Sotyi Howk
- Tumi Ashbei Aami Jaani

==== Nishiddho Istehar (1998) – His Master's Voice ====
- Bidroho
- Chil
- Jake Bhalobashi
- Jomi
- Jua
- Kangalpona
- Kobi
- Kobiyal
- Meyeta
- Nishiddho Istehar
- Niyom Nei
- Prothom Ma
- Sukumar Ray
- Surhid

==== Pagla Shanai (1999) – His Master's Voice ====
- Bhalobasha
- Bicholito
- Boka Meye
- Dhaka
- Etai Ekhon Kaaj
- Graham Stuart Stein
- Hands Up
- Ho Chi Minh
- Kather Pa
- Nastho Somay
- Pagla Shanai
- Prostuti
- Uthal Pathal

==== Jabo Ochenaye (2001) – His Master's Voice ====
- Amar Chhuti
- Britha Chhuti
- Chilka
- Darjeelinger Gaan
- Ei Bhabe
- Ekla Hole
- Hartal
- Hothat Chhuti
- Jabo Ochenaye
- Murgir Chhuti
- Oi Pare Chhuti
- Radhanather Chhuti
- Tomakei Dorkar
- Tumi Bollei
- Tumi to Cholle

==== Aadab (2002) – His Master's Voice ====
- Aadab
- Ayan Rashid
- Birodhi
- Daay
- Dilshad
- Ekta Thalay
- Kakhon Tomar
- Kar Desh
- Mithyebadi
- Shikarir Khnoje
- Sonkhaloghur Dol-e
- Tao ki Hoy

==== Reaching Out (2003) – Kosmic Music ====
- Wish You Were Here
- For You Calcutta
- Prisoner
- Information Blues
- God Don't Bless
- The Wind
- Silently
- Cross the Line
- The Dusk
- A Holy Bomb

==== Dekhchhi Toke (2004) – Cozmik Harmony ====
- Dekhchhi Toke
- Bhab / Karnish-e Duto Payra
- Hatchhara Hoye Jawa Train
- Kar Naam Kanchan
- Nachte Chaichho Bujhi
- Ekdhoroner Bidroho Holo Gaan
- Hujur, Banda Hajir
- Tumi Chhile Hafijer

==== Rizwanur Brityo (2008) – Artist himself ====
- Aborodh (Khun Howa Gaan)
- Ami Jai
- Bhalo Meyera
- Bhulo Na Athoba Bhule Jao
- Hoye Jabe Byabostha
- Ki ar Emon
- Rizwanurer Gaan

==== Protirodh (2008) – Cozmik Harmony ====
- Ajay Bagdi
- Baamjawr
- Esho Prem
- Janan Dichchhe
- Karl Marx
- Mamata Achhe
- Nishaner Naam
- Protirodh

==== Chhotrodhorer Gaan (2010) – Artist himself and later by Bijalpa Music ====
- Agey Vote Din
- Amar Premer Gaan
- Bonduk Nile Hate
- Chhotrodhorer Gaan
- Dundubhi
- Gna-e Bidroho
- Jangol Tumi Kar?

==== Lalmohoner Lash (2010) – Questz World / Saptarshi Prakashan ====
- Lalmohoner Lash
- Apnake Niye
- Meyer Madhyamik
- Kon Sorkar
- Bhule Achho Jara
- Bondhu
- Tirer Fola
- Kabir Suman
- Tomar Jonyo

==== 63 te (2012) ====
- Lukono Baul
- Mrityu Ese Daaklo Jakhan
- Baatas Gaichhe Gaan
- Dighar Samuddur
- Beer
- Bijoyee
- Jwalbe Aagun
- Kabir Jethur Gaan
- Chhitamonir Chokh
- Bhupen Hazarika
- Jagori
- Shashak
- Bishwas Raakhi
- Tomay Bhalobaasi
- Ghumiye Paro Gaan

Since 2011, many old and new songs are publishing in his website and Facebook

=== Compilations and live recordings ===
- Sumaner Gaan (1994) – His Master's Voice/EMI
- Shawmokhkhe/Upfront- Live(1996) – Biswas Records
- Baanshuriya (1998) – His Master's Voice
- Suman Top 10 (1999) – His Master's Voice
- Beesh Shawtoker Sheshe (2000) – His Master's Voice
- Nagorik Kobiyaal (2001)
- Hits of Suman Chattopadhyay (2001) – His Master's Voice
- Gaanola Dhakay (2008) – CHIRKUT[16]/ Saptarshi
- Gaanola (2008)- His Master's Voice (MP3 compilation)
- Bidroher Gaan (2010) – USDF (VCD) (with Bidyut Bhowmik)

=== Collaborative albums ===
- Onyo Katha Onyo Gaan Volumes I & II (1986) – Sing To Live [with Nagorik]
- Nicaraguar Jonyo (1986) – Sing To Live [with Nagorik]
- E Desh Tomaar Aamar (1991) – SFI / His Master's Voice
- Konthe Nilaam Notun Gaan (1994) – Concord Records (two songs sung by Concord Trio)
- Shobujer Protishodh (1995) – His Master's Voice (Haimanti Sukla)

==== Choto Boro Mile (1996) – His Master's Voice ====
[with Nachiketa Chakravarty, Anjan Dutt, Indrani Sen, Lopamudra Mitra, Payel Kar, Shalini Chatterjee, Sreetoma Ghosh, Shayari Das, Tanushree Haldar, Paromita Chatterjee, Reema Roy, Shubhanwita Guha and Reetomaa Gupto (All Composition: Kabir Suman)]

1. Bagher Meso-Ritoma Gupta
2. Khaoar Gaan-Suman, Nachiketa, Anjan
3. Nagor Dolar Gaan-Sritama, Shalini, Sayari, Tanusree
4. Schooler Bagta-Paramita, Shalini, Sayari, Tanusree, Anjan & Others
5. Tuntunitar Tinti Lafe-Lopamudra, Shalini, Sayari & Others
6. Tomar Bandhu-Payel
7. Chuti Chuti-Indrani, Shalini, Sayari, Tanusree & Others
8. Hathuk Sab Asundar-Anjan, Shalini, Sayari & Others
9. Indur Kal-Lopamudra, ParamitaShalini, Sayari, Tanusree & Others
10. Jhar-Nachiketa
11. Masto Akash-Indrani
12. Ultodangar Ultodike-Shalini, Sayari, Tanisree & Shreetama
13. Chutlo Chutite-Shalini, Sayari, Tanisree & Shreetama
14. Feludar Gaan-Suman, Anjan, Nachiketa
- Notun Gaaner Nouka Bawa (1997) – Bhetorghore Brishti (1998) – His Master's Voice [two songs sung by Lopamudra Mitra on each album]
- Dhanya Hok (1998) – His Master's Voice [two songs sung by Sandhya Mukherjee]
- Shesh Dorjata Perole (1998) – His Master's Voice [two songs sung by Sandhya Mukherjee]
- Tomaye Khnujechi (1999) – Soundtech Sabina Yasmin
- Ochena Chuti / Gaane Gaane Duti Mon (1999) – Raagaa/Soundtech [with Sabina Yasmin]
- Aashche Shotabdite (1999) – His Master's Voice [two songs sung by Sandhya Mukherjee]
- Ekshaathe Bnachboi (1999) – His Master's Voice [with Sohini, Shinjini, Debdutta, Shidhdhaartho, Anirban, Oindrila, Shreya, Shilpi, Arindam, Chiranjeeb, Rajshekhar, Shongeeta, Gaargi, Arundhati, Indrani, Shoilangi, Gargi, Aakaash and Payel]
- Rongdhonu Taanaa Shetu (2000) – His Master's Voice [two songs sung by Sandhya Mukherjee]
- Shada Paayra Giyeche Ure (2001) – His Master's Voice [two songs sung by Sandhya Mukherjee]
- Tumi Gaan Gaile (2002) – Prime Music (Indranil Sen)
- Awshshomedher Ghora Chhutchche (2003) – His Master's Voice [two songs sung by Sandhya Mukherjee]
- Protichhobi (2004) – No Audio Release [with Sabina Yasmin and Bnaadhon]
- Onekdin Por (2004) – Cozmic Harmony [with Anjan Dutt]
- Tero (2006) – Cozmic Harmony [with Sabina Yasmin]
- Suprabhat Bishannata (2008) – Cozmic Harmony (Sabina Yasmin)

=== Live albums and collaborations ===
- Onurodher Aashor (1994) – T-Series
- Ei Shomoye Ei Dujon- Live at GD Birla Sabhaghar (1997) – His Master's Voice (with Nachiketa)
- Tribeni (1997) – His Master's Voice [with Nachiketa Chakravarty and Anjan Dutt]
- Notun Shurer Chnoa (1999) – His Master's Voice (with Sandhya Mukhopadhyay, Lopamudra Mitra, Haimanti Sukla and Swagatalakshmi Dasgupta)
- Praan Khola Gaan (1999) – His Master's Voice (with Lopamudra Mitra, Nachiketa Chakraborty and Bhoomi)
- Onyo Hawaye Onyo Gaan (2004) – His Master's Voice [with Lopamudra Mitra]
- Pujor Shera Gaan (2004) – His Master's Voice [with Sandhya Mukhopadhyay]
- Graphiti (2006) – His Master's Voice [with Nachiketa Chakravarty, Anjan Dutt, Lopamudra Mitra, Protul Mukherjee and Moushumi Bhowmick]
- Onno gaaner bhorey (2009) – His Master's Voice (with Nachiketa)

=== Film albums ===
- Obhimaane Onuraage (1992) [Unreleased] – [Playback Singers: Kabir Suman]
- Attojaa (1993) – [No Audio Release][Playback Singers: Kabir Suman, Haimanti Sukla]
- Mahasangram (1994) – His Master's Voice [Playback Singers: Kabir Suman, Indrani Sen]
- Bhoy (1996) – Beethoven Records [Playback Singer: Kabir Suman in two songs]
- Krishnachura [Bilingual in Assamese (released) and Bengali (unreleased)] (1995) – His Master's Voice [Playback Singers: Kabir Suman, Haimanti Sukla]
- Jodhdha (1995) – His Master's Voice [Playback Singer: Kabir Suman in one song]
- Shedin Choitromash (1997) – His Master's Voice [Playback Singers: Kabir Suman, Nachiketa Chakravarty, Swagatatalakhi Dasgupta and Lopamudra Mitra]
- Shurjokanya (1998) – His Master's Voice [Playback Singers: Kabir Suman, Sriradha Banerjee, Swagatatalakhi Dasgupta and Srikanto Acharya ]
- Katha (2007) – [No Audio Release]
- Diet (2009) – [No Audio Release] [Playback Singers: Kabir Suman, Sabina Yasmin]
- Ranjana Ami Ar Asbona (2011)
- Jaatishwar (2014) – T Series [Playback Singers: Kabir Suman, Rupankar Bagchi & others]
- Shankar Mudi (2016) – R P Tech-vision [Playback Singers: Kabir Suman, Srikanto Acharya, Pratik Chowdhury, Raghab Chatterjee, Bidipta Chakrabarty & others]
- Guhamanab (2017) – Amara Muzik [Playback Singers: Kabir Suman, Raka Bhattacharya]

=== Other work ===
==== Bibliography ====
- Suman, Kabir (2012). Discovering the Other America: Radical Voices from the 1980s in conversation with Kabir Suman. Thema. ISBN 978-93-81703-10-6.
- Sumanami
- Mon-Mejaj
- Alkhalla
- Hoye Otha Gaan
- Kon Pothe Gelo Gaan
- Sumaner Gaan, Sumaner Bhashya
- Mukto Nicaragua
- Sumaner Gaan
- Durer Janla
- Nishaner Naam Tapasi Malik

==== Filmography ====
- Herbert (2005)
- Chaturanga (2008)

== Awards and honours ==
- 1997 – BFJA Awards – Best Lyrics for Bhai
- 2014 – National Film Award for Best Music Direction for the film Jaatishwar.
- 2014 – Mirchi Music Awards Bangla for Music Composer of The Year (E Tumi Kemon Tumi – Jaatishwar)
- 2014 – Mirchi Music Awards Bangla for Lyricist of The Year (Khudar Kasam Jaan – Jaatishwar)
- 2015 – Honoured with Sangeet Mahasamman by Government of West Bengal.
- 2018 – Honorary D.Litt awarded by Kalyani University.

== Controversies ==
=== Allegations of domestic violence ===
One of Suman's former wives was a German national. She reportedly accused Suman of domestic violence and filed a criminal complaint against Suman. According to The Indian Express, Suman's "messy divorce...and rumours of domestic violence didn't go down well with the people."

=== Support for ban on book by Taslima Nasrin ===
Suman supported a ban by the Government of West Bengal on the book Dwikhandito, written by the Bangladeshi writer and activist Taslima Nasrin, for allegedly blaspheming the Prophet Mohammed. The ban was later lifted by the Calcutta High Court. Nasrin, referring to a television appearance where Suman denounced her book, has stated: "I did not fear the threats made against me by the Islamic radicals as much as the fatwa issued by Kabir Suman." Nasrin has alleged that she lived in fear following Suman's remarks, and described Suman as "communal" and "zealously Islamic", following his conversion to Islam. Academic Malvika Maheshwari has linked Suman's initial candidature by the Trinamool Congress with his support for the ban on Nasrin's book, as part of a "policy of 'Muslim appeasement'" by the party.

=== Abusive language towards a journalist ===
In January 2022, Suman attacked in abusive language over the phone in a conversation with journalist Bittu Raychaudhuri from Republic TV, which was illegally recorded by the media house, without informing Suman. Suman's conduct was widely criticised and led to a criminal complaint being filed against him for attacking Hindu sentiments and misogynistic vulgar statements about women in West Bengal.
