= Creme 21 =

German-origin skincare brand

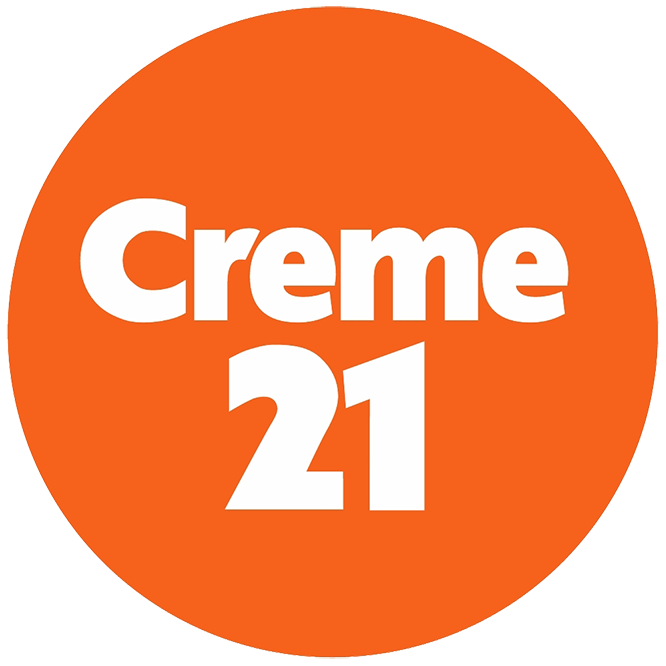
- Product type: Skin and body care
- Current owner: Henkel KGaA (1967-2003); Creme 21 GmbH; Emami (2019-present)
- Country: Germany
- Introduced: 1967; 59 years ago
- Markets: Middle Eastern countries, India
- Website: creme21.com

Creme 21 is a German-origin skincare brand which was founded in 1967 by Henkel. It is now owned by an Indian conglomerate company, Emami, and is based in Bad Homburg vor der Höhe, Hesse, Germany.

== History ==
Originally founded by Henkel in 1967 which was acquired by Antje Willems-Stickel when she bought the trademark from Henkel KGaA and refounded the company.

In the 1970s its advertising campaign was, according to the manufacturer, the first to show bare skin. During the 1960s, the way in which cosmetics and skincare products were marketed and sold to consumers changed. Cosmetics and skincare products were originally just sold by specialist retailers, such as chemists and department stores. At the same time as the growth in grocery shopping in supermarkets and convenience stores, Henkel announced in 1967 the instigation of project Lebensmitteleinzelhandel-Kosmetik. Its aim was to develop different products specifically for self-service retailers, leading to the creation of Creme 21.

The colour orange and the plastic container represented modernity. The number 21, the then-current age the one became a legal adult, expressed that the skincare cream was for young and old, and the whole family.

The product was discontinued in the mid-1980s, due to faltering demand. Twenty years, later the entrepreneur Antje Stickel bought the intellectual properties for the product from Henkel and founded Creme 21, GmbH. The product's name and styling were borrowed in the 1990s by German pop band Creme 21, best known for their cover of Rudi Carrell's "Wann wird's mal wieder richtig Sommer?".

In 2003, Antje J Willems Stickel acquired the brand from Henkel.

On January 25, 2019, Emami Ltd., an Indian cosmetics and personal care company acquired Creme 21 GmbH for EUR 8 million.

== See also ==
- Nivea
- Dove
- Vaseline
