= Vijay Kichlu =

Indian classical singer (1930–2023)

Pandit Vijay Kichlu (16 September 1930 – 17 February 2023) was an Indian classical singer. He studied Dhrupad with the Senior Dagar Brothers (Ustad Nasir Moinuddin Dagar and Ustad Nasir Aminuddin Dagar) and Khayal with Latafat Hussain Khan, whose style had a strong connection with Dhrupad. He and his brother, Ravi Kichlu, formed a famous classical vocalist duo.

Kichlu was the founder and head of the ITC Sangeet Research Academy for 25 years until he decided to retire due to change in management at the ITC headquarters.

Kichlu founded Sangeet Research Academy for patronising and nurturing upcoming talents in Indian classical music. In 2018, he was bestowed with the civilian award Padma Shri by the Government of India.

Kichlu died on 17 February 2023, at the age of 93.
