= Zandu Realty =

Indian based pharmaceutical firm

Zandu Care
- Company type: Public
- Traded as: BSE: 506720; NSE: ZANDUREALT
- Industry: Pharmaceutical, Ayurveda
- Founded: October 1910 (incorporated in 1919); Mumbai, India
- Founder: Sandeep Jhunjhunwala (CFO/Manager)
- Headquarters: Kolkata, India
- Area served: India
- Products: Ayurvedic Medicines & Products
- Owner: Emami
- Number of employees: 2,000 (2009)
- Website: Official Website

Zandu Care Limited (formerly Zandu Pharmaceutical Works Limited) is an Indian multinational pharmaceutical company based in Kolkata. Its core business is manufacturing and dealing in Ayurvedic and medicinal preparations and owned by Emami.

== History ==
Established in 1910 by Prabhashankar Pattani, Prime Minister of the erstwhile state of Bhavnagar with Zandu Bhatt, Zandu went public in 1919 with the issuance of stocks.

The company derives its name from Vaidhya Zandu Bhattji, the original founder of the firm named Zandu Pharmaceuticals. He was a renowned Vaidhya not only of Gujarat but India in late 19th century and early 20th century. The Vaidhya family's stake has been sold to Emami in 2008 for ₹730 crores
