= Radhe Shyam Agarwal =

Indian businessman (born 1946)

- Born: 18 February 1946 (age 80); Calcutta, Bengal Presidency, British India
- Education: St. Xavier's College; Calcutta University; Institute of Chartered Accountants of India; Institute of Company Secretaries of India
- Occupation: businessman

Radhe Shyam Agarwal (also known as R S Agarwal) is an Indian entrepreneur, co-founder and executive chairman of Emami, a global group of company engaged in the business of FMCG, paper, real estate, edible oils, health care and cement. Radhe is among the top 100 richest Indians and was listed by Forbes as having a net worth of $1.43 billion in 2015.

== Early life ==
Radhe was born in a Marwari family on 18 February 1946 in Kolkata, India. Radhe completed his college education from St. Xavier's College, Kolkata. He got his LLB from Calcutta University, and M.Com from Calcutta University. Radhe is a Chartered Accountant from Institute of Chartered Accountants of India and Company Secretary from Institute of Company Secretaries of India. In 1970 Radhe joined Aditya Birla Group as vice president.

== Emami ==
In 1974 Radhe along with his school friend Radhe Shyam Goenka, started a cosmetics company Emami. The company was started with a capital of $2600 borrowed from Radhe Shyam Goenka's father. Emami is now a multiple business global group of companies with a revenue of above $1.3 billion.

== Associations ==
Radhe also serves as Joint Chairman and Director of Emami group of companies, Executive Director of Emami, and Director of Zandu Realty. He had also served as Director of West Bengal Industrial Development Corporation and Trustee of Merchant Chamber of Commerce and Industries.

== Personal life ==
Radhe is married to Usha Bansal and has two sons, Aditya Agarwal and Harsh Agarwal, and one daughter, Priti Agarwal Sureka. The entire family is part of the Emami group and lives on tony Southern Avenue in Kolkata, India. Priti Agarwal is married to Raj Sureka.

== Criminal charges ==
In the early morning of 9 December 2011, an AMRI Hospital in south Kolkata's Dhakuria district erupted in fire, leading to the deaths of 92 people — mostly critically ill patients, many of them suffocating in their sleep. The following day, the license for the hospital was cancelled, and the Chief Minister of West Bengal ordered a judicial inquiry into the incident. Allegedly, the fire was triggered by flammable chemicals that were stored at the site. Rescue efforts were hampered by the narrowness and congestion of the road leading to the hospital, and the allegations that all of the windows and doors were locked and that the fire alarms and sprinklers installed at the hospital did not work during the fire.

Seven members of the hospital's board were arrested the same day, and were remanded to police custody until 20 December by the court of the Chief Judicial Magistrate in Alipore. Among the seven arrested were Agarwal and Goenka, founders of Emami and directors of the hospital chain, who were charged with negligently causing the deaths. Ultimately a total of 16 people stood accused in the courts in July 2016, including the board members and several directors of the hospital. Amongst the charges were culpable homicide not amounting to murder under section 304 of the Indian Penal Code, which carries a maximum sentence of 10 years imprisonment in cases where the criminal actions are undertaken knowingly but without the intention to cause death. Additional charges were laid under Section 308 (attempt to commit culpable homicide) and Section 38 (effect caused partly by act and partly by omission).

The fire was recorded as the largest hospital tragedy in India at the time.
