= Raka Bhattacharya =

Indian playback singer

- Born: Raka Bhattacharya; 19 May 1985 (age 40); Krishnanagar, Nadia
- Origin: Krishnanagar, Nadia, West Bengal
- Genres: Bengali Modern, Rabindra Sangeet, Ganasangeet, Bengali Folk
- Occupations: Playback singer, singer, composer, lyricist
- Instruments: Vocals, rhythm guitar, harmonium
- Years active: 2016–present
- Labels: Kaleidoscope Bioscope, Amara Muzik

Raka Bhattacharya is an Indian playback singer from Kolkata, West Bengal. She primarily sings Bengali songs.

She shot to fame in 2016, with her first single release, 'Brishti Pagol'. Brishti Pagol was a love song that she sang as a duet, with legendary Bengali musician Kabir Suman. The song was composed by Anindya Bhattacharya while Kabir Suman and poet Joyasish Ghosh penned down the lyrics. The song, initially released through YouTube, was well appreciated by the Bengali listeners.

Bhattacharya debuted as a playback singer in the Chiranjeet Chakraborty starred romantic drama Guhamanob (2017), directed by Paromita Munsi. The soundtrack of the film included two songs by Raka, one a solo rendition of Rabindranath Tagore's Sesh Ganeri Resh and Shedin Dujone, another Rabindrasangeet that she sang with Kabir Suman. Kabir Suman scored the music for the film. The movie received mixed reviews from critics, but the Soundtrack was uniformly appreciated.
