= Ravi Kichlu =

Classical Hindustani vocalist of Agra gharana (1932–1993)

Ravi Kichlu (Kashmiri: रवि किचलू (Devanagari), راوی کچلو (Nastaleeq)) (24 December 1932 – September 1993), popularly known as Pandit Ravi Kichlu, was a prominent classical Hindustani vocalist of Agra gharana, who formed a well-known duo with his brother Vijay Kichlu. He studied Dhrupad under the Dagar Brothers, Ustad Moinuddin and Ustad Aminuddin Dagar and was later a 'shagird' of Ustad Latafat Hussain Khan, a doyen of the Agra Gharana. He thus imbibed a unique style, a mix of 'Dagar Bani' and Agra 'Gharana'. Pandit Ravi Kichlu was well known not only as a classical vocalist, but as a leading exponent of semi classical and folk forms - such as Thumri, Dadra, Kajri, Chaiti - and a collection of Ghazals, the music of which he composed himself.
