= Suprakash Chaki =

Bengali singer

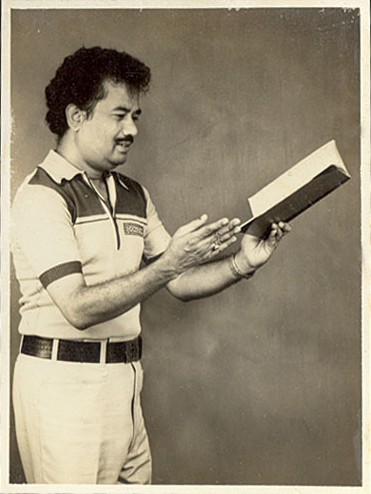
- Suprakash Chaki

Background information
- Origin: Kolkata, West Bengal, India
- Genres: Adhunik Bengali Songs, Rabindra Sangeet, Najrul Geeti, Bhakti Geeti
- Occupations: Singer, lyricist, composer
- Years active: 1962
- Website: artistsuprakash.ueuo.com

Suprakash Chaki is a Bengali singer, who also sings modern songs, including ‘Eshona nutan jagot gori’, ‘Alo-aandharer shathei’, ‘Tomar o chokhhe’ and ‘Akash jakhon natun ronge shaaje’. Suprakash is noted for 'raga sangeet' and ‘Tomari binar’ replete with the shooting touch of the raga Desi. His sober approach and melodious voice has won the appreciation of listeners all over India, ranging from the romantic ‘Bhalobasha biliye dite’ by Khitish Santra, to the simplicity of ‘Manikmoti’ by Panchanan Das. Suprakash has also tuned the puja-songs of Leena Ghatok and Babul Saha. He has also been the affiliated composer and lyricist of Television and Akashbani and trainer of Jadavpur University and Banichakra.

== Early life ==
Birth Place : Dinajpur (Bangladesh)

Father's Name : Ahibhushan Chaki

Mother's Name : Jyotsnarani Chaki

Wife's Name : Shrimati Shamita Chaki (Vocalist)

School Education : Modern School

Higher Education : City College (Armhest Street)

Sanskrit Education (Tol) : Chandrakrishore Chatushpathi Teacher : Late Durgaprashanna Bidyabhusan

Music Education : Sangeetnatak Academy, Geetabetan

Sangeet Guru : Late Jyotibhusan Chaki, Late Jyotirindra Maitra, Late Tansen Pande (Dhrupad), Late Tarapada Chakraborty (Kheyal), Late Rameshchandra Bandopadhay, Shri Amiyaranjan Bandopadhay, Late Chitta Ray, Late Aparesh Lahiri, Late Kamala Basu

The artiste is an affiliated singer, composer and lyricist of A.I.R and Television. Artiste Suprakash Chaki was inspired by popular actor Late Uttam Kumar, Late Jyotibhusan Chaki, Natyakar Late Shambhu Mitra, Journalist Shandhya Sen, Swaraj Sengupta.

== Awards ==
- Artist Suprakash had won Narayan Gangopadhay Smriti Purashkar
- He also won the Shanskar Bharati(W.B) shambardhana
- Suprakash Chaki was awarded with the Pabna Gopal Chandra Institution Purashkar for his achievements in Music Junior Chamber

== Music records ==
- Nana shadher gaan
- Edin amar chirodin
- Aadhunik
- Gulzar-i-ghazal
- Agamanir aanginay
- Shri shri ramakrishna
- Amar shapno bhora din
- Chhoray gaaney
- Deb debi bandana
- Ramakrishna sharada bandana
- Kaali naam-er shagore
- Shonaar aloy
- Debi bandana
- Rabindra sangeet
