= Usha Rani Das =

Indian footballer

Personal information
- Date of birth: 5 November 1991 (age 34)
- Place of birth: Kolkata, West Bengal, India
- Position: Goalkeeper

International career
Years	Team	Apps	(Gls)
2011–	India	9	(0)

Usha Rani Das (born 5 November 1991 in Kolkata) is an Indian women footballer who plays as a goalkeeper for India women's national football team.

== International ==
Das was part of the Indian National Team that played Bahrain in 2011 and Palestina in 2013.
