= Rupankar Bagchi =

Indian Bengali singer (born 1972)

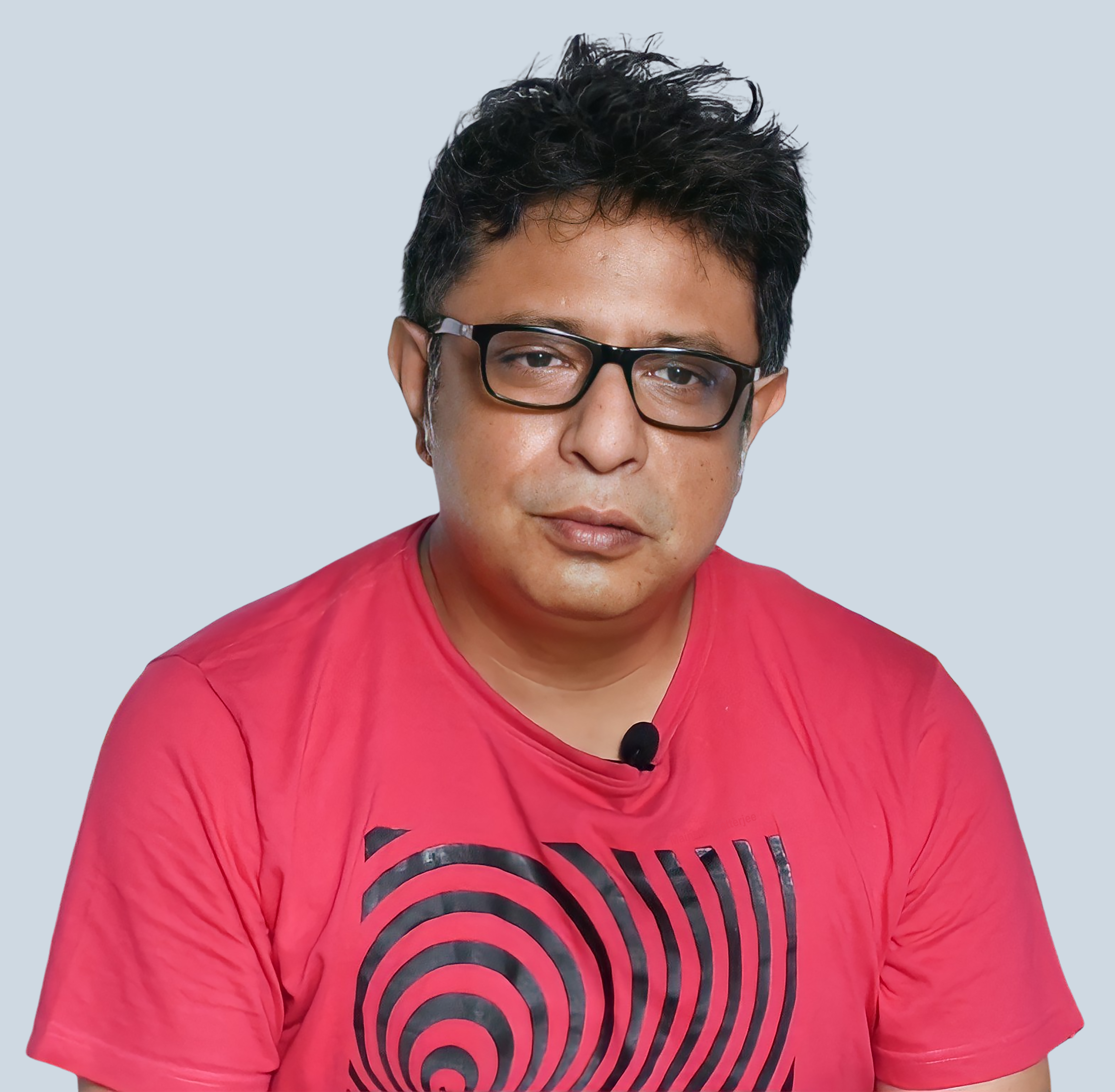
- Rupankar Bagchi

Background information
- Born: 2 December 1972 (age 53); Kolkata, West Bengal, India
- Genres: Modern Bengali Music; Indian Classical Music; Filmi
- Occupations: Singer; Songwriter; Playback Singer; Composer
- Instrument: Guitar
- Website: www.rupankar.com

Rupankar Bagchi, also known mononymously as Rupankar, is a Bengali singer-songwriter, playback singer and actor from Kolkata, India.

He has sung many famous songs in recent Bengali films like Chalo Let's Go (2008), Baishe Srabon (2011), Aparajita Tumi (2012), Hemlock society (2012), Dutta Vs Dutta (2012), Jaatishwar (2014), Chotushkone (2014) and Monn (2018). He was awarded the National Film Award for Best Male Playback Singer by the Government of India for the song "E Tumi Kemon Tumi" from Jaatishwar. During the COVID-19 pandemic, he released a song titled Tor Saathe, under Times Music label.

== Early life ==
Bagchi was born in a Bengali family and at an early age he learned classical vocal from his father Ritendra Nath Bagchi and Rabindra Sangeet from his mother Sumitra Bagchi. He was trained in classical music from Sukumar Mitra and in modern songs from Jatileswar Mukhopadhyay. His first stage performance was at the age of eleven. In 1999, he married Chaitali Lahiri.

== Discography ==
- Tumi Shunbe Ki? (Debut album)
- Ei jeno shei chokh
- Bondhu dekha hobe
- Anmone Amake Bhabo
- Meghe roddure
- Ami Tomake Chini
- Bhokatta
- Poth Bhola (Rabindra Sangeet)
- Highway
- Ganer jharnatolay (Rabindra Sangeet)
- O chand
- Fire esho Ruby ray
- Tomay gan shonabo (Rabindra Sangeet)
- Neel
- Shopping Mall
- Tui jabi koto dur
- Faltu
- Sada Kalo
- Tagore timeless (Rabindra Sangeet)
- Monihar
- Shokol Kajer Kaji (Nazrul Sangeet)
- Roots(folk)
- Acoustic
- Best of Rupankar
- Best of Rupankar, Vol. 2

Tane

- Anek Durey with Bumpai Chakraborty
- Rupkothar Tumi with Jayanta Roy
- Elo agomonir din with Bumpai Chakraborty and diganta Das
- Kal Bhor Hobey, duet with Sarbajit Ghosh from the music album Monn.
- Priyotama 3
- Tor Saathe duet with Roma Mitra
- Oi dakho

== Famous songs ==
- Govire Jao – Baishe Srabon (2011)
- Sharata din Ar Shara Raat – Rupkatha Noy (2011)
- Roopkathara – Aparajita Tumi (2012)
- Gaan Khuje Paai – Chalo Let's Go (2008)
- Chupi Chupi Raat – Chalo Let's Go (2008)
- Amar Mawte – Hemlock society (2012)
- Tobu jodi – Dutta Vs Dutta (2012)
- Jhal Legechey – Ganesh Talkies (2013)
- Shedin Dujoney – Ganesh Talkies (2013)
- E Tumi Kemon Tumi – Jaatishwar (2014)
- Sohosa Ele Ki – Jaatishwar (2014)
- Setai Sotti – Chotushkone (2014)
- Oh Baby – Na Jene Mon (2014)
- Tor Nam Prem – Besh Korechi Prem Korechi (2015)
- Ae boshonte [Z cinema film onne boshonte 2015]
- Kal Bhor Hobey (feat. Sarbajit Ghosh) – Monn (2018)
- Jaago Uma- Uma (2018)
- Tor Saathe - 2020 - Times Music

== Awards ==
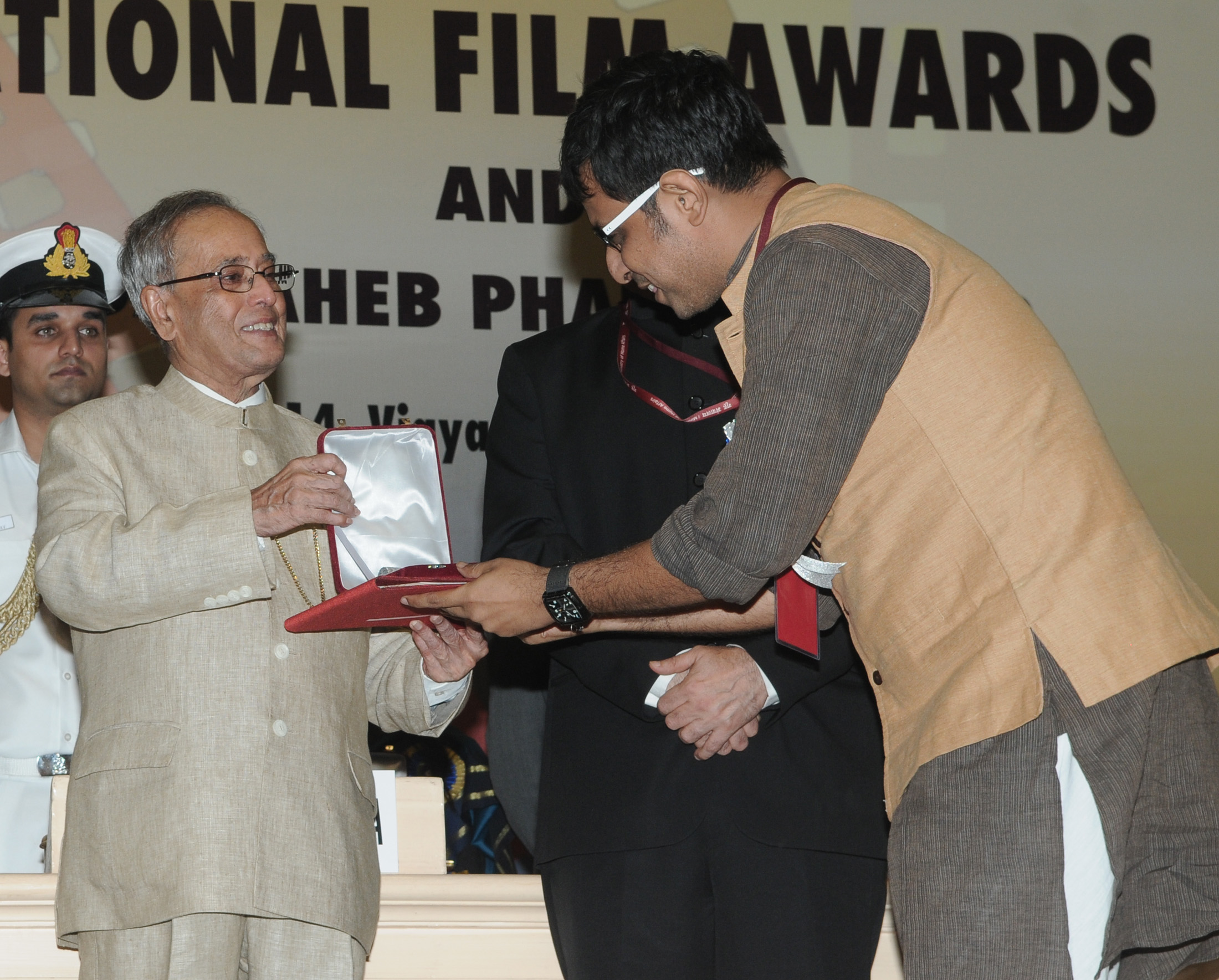
The President, Shri Pranab Mukherjee presenting the Rajat Kamal Award for Best Male Playback Singer: Jaatishwar (Bengali) to Shri Rupankar Bagchi, at the 61st National Film Awards function, in New Delhi on 3 May 2014.

- 2014: National Film Award for Best Male Playback Singer – "E Tumi Kemon Tumi" from Jaatishwar

== Nomination ==
- 2010 : Bangla Sangit Purashkar for Best Male Singer – "Tobe Prem Kake Chay" from album Mohonay
- 2010 : Bangla Sangit Purashkar for Best Album – for Mohonay
- 2011: Bangla Sangit Purashkar for Best Male Playback Singer – "Gobheere Jao" from Baishe Srabon
- 2011 : Radio Mirchi Music Award for Best Male Playback Singer – "Gobheere Jao" from Baishe Srabon
- 2011 : Friends FM Award for Best Male Playback Singer – "Gobheere Jao" from Baishe Srabon
- 2011 : Zee Bangla Gourab Samman for Best Male Playback Singer – "Gobheere Jao" from Baishe Srabon
- 2019 : The SRL Award for Vocalist of the Decade 2010 – 2019 (Male), given by SRL Motion Pictures Entertainment

== Filmography ==
- Sin Sister as police detective Agnibesh Chatterjee.
- Biday Byomkesh as DC Krishnendu Malo
- Played a cameo as himself singing in the studio in the song Kal Bhor Hobey from Monn alongside Sarbajit Ghosh. The video also featured Rohan Basu, Sonia Saha & Amrita Chakraborty in various other roles.
- Manikanchana
- The stoneman murders (web series) (hoichoi)
- Abar Kanchanjungha

== Controversy ==
In May 2022, hours before the sudden death of KK in Kolkata, Bagchi stated on his Facebook live that he is better than any KK.
