= Jyoti Goho =

Indian classical musician (born 1953)

Pandit Jyoti Goho
- Born: May 13, 1953 (age 73); Kolkata, West Bengal, India
- Genres: Hindustani classical music
- Occupations: Harmonium player; Musician
- Instrument: Harmonium
- Years active: 1976–present
- Website: www.jyotigoho.com

Pandit Jyoti Goho (born 1953) is an Indian Classical Musician from Kolkata, India. He is well known for Harmonium accompaniment. He belongs to Kirana Gharana. He is working in Indian classical music industry from last 40 years and is a Musician Faculty at ITC Sangeet Research Academy, Kolkata, India.

== Early life ==
Jyoti Goho was born on 13 May 1953 in Kolkata, West Bengal to Shri Shyam Sundar Goho & Late Smt Bela Goho. He belongs to a musical family. He completed his school level education from Khudiram Bose Central Collegiate School, Kolkata & college education from Seth Anandram Jaipuria College, Kolkata. He holds a bachelor's degree in arts.

He was inspired by his mother’s melodious voice, thus he developed keen interest in music from his childhoo. His parents carefully nurtured his interest in music. He got training in harmonium from Pandit Deb Kumar Banerjee. He also holds very profound knowledge of Hindustani vocal music in which his Gurus were Pandit A.Kanan, Shri Sanat Banerjee & Shri Biren Bose.

== Career ==
Jyoti Goho started performing Live as a Harmonium accompanist in various classical music programme & shows from the year 1976.

Jyoti Goho accompanied many times with Pandit Bhimsen Joshi who praised Jyoti Goho as an extremely supportive Harmonium accompanist. Goho has performed in many major music conferences of India & abroad. Some of the countries where he has performed are Canada, U.K., France, Germany, Switzerland, the Netherlands, Dubai, Australia and New Zealand, China etc.

Other than Harmonium accompaniment in Live Shows, Jyoti Goho Played Harmonium in many music albums of various artists like Pandit Ajoy Chakraborty, Ustad Rashid Khan etc.

His son Sourabh Goho is an Indian Tabla Player who performs Hindustani classical music and fusion music.

== Awards ==
- Jnan Prakash Ghosh Award 2014 from Pt. Ajoy Chakraborty
- Batuk Nandy Smriti Samman 2015
- Choughule Samman 2014 at Indore, Madhya Pradesh
