= Rajeswari Vaidyanathan =

Indian Choreographer

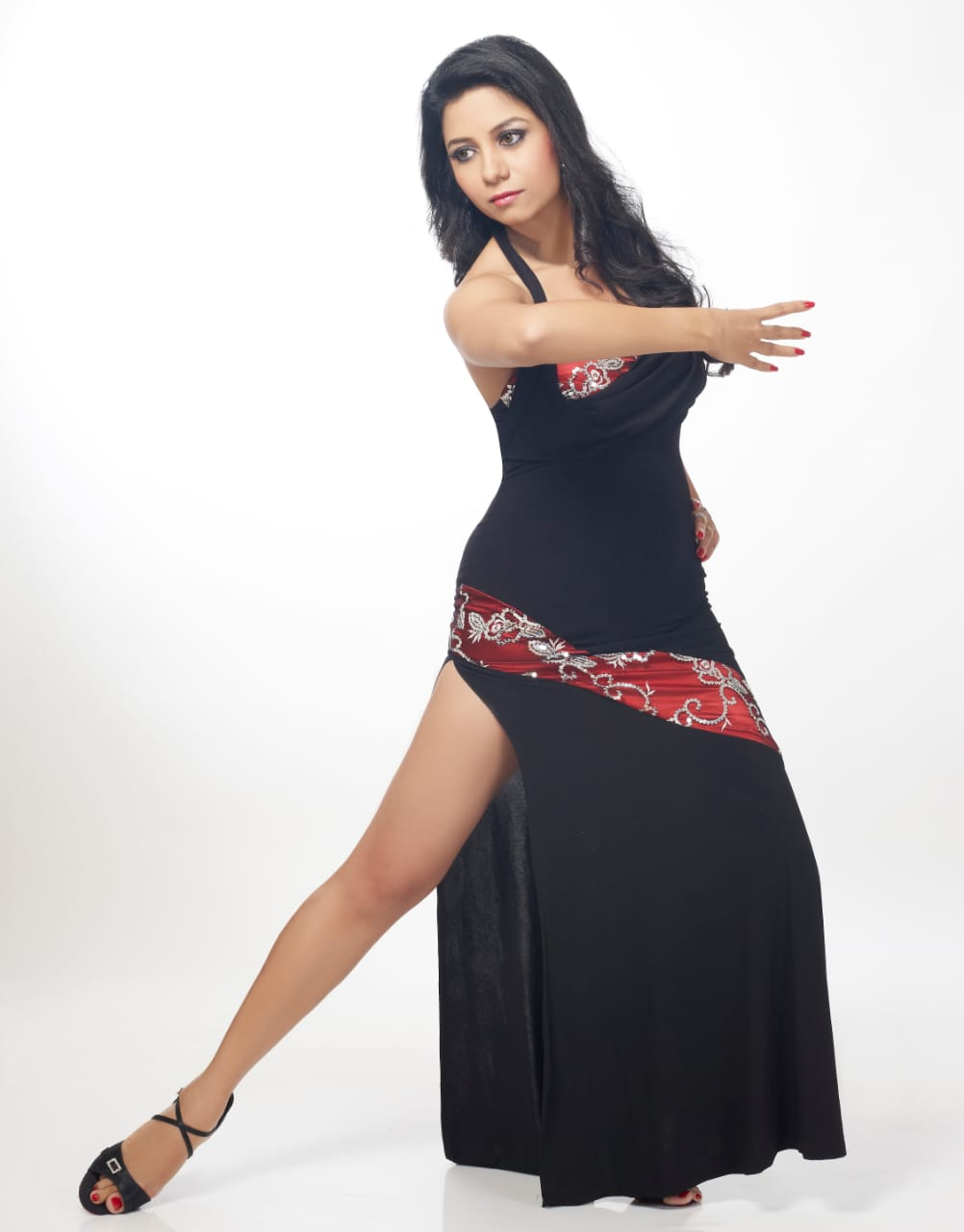
- Born: Kolkata
- Occupations: Dancer, Choreographer
- Known for: International Latin Ballroom Dance

Rajeswari Vaidyanathan is a TEDx speaker, trainer, performer and a choreographer of International Latin Ballroom Dance forms. She is the founder of dance school VR DanceSport, the largest Latin Ballroom dance school in India, providing International level social and competitive training.

== Early life ==
Vaidyanathan is from Kolkata. She has done her MBA from ICFAI Business School. She has also done Honours in English from Loreto College under Calcutta University. A top level banker as a profession, she gave up her corporate career as Senior Vice President, to pursue a career in dance.

== Career ==
Vaidyanathan was a senior vice president at Yes Bank.She has also worked in ICICI bank, Citibank, Kotak Mahindra Bank. She is a trainer in Latin Ballroom Dance forms. She is the founder of VR DanceSport which pioneered International Latin Ballroom in India. She has also brought World Dance Council to India and hosted the largest national level Latin Ballroom dance championship in India 2015–2017. 2018 she became the Indian Ambassador to Freedom to Dance, UK. She provides International level training in various dance forms like Salsa, Bachata, ChaCha, Jive, Samba, Argentine Tango, Rumba, Waltz. She has choreographed in 2016 Hindi film Befikre and 2020 web series A Suitable Boy

=== As choreographer ===
- Befikre
- A Suitable Boy
- The Good Karma Hospital

== Awards ==
- Gold & Silver Medalists in International dancesport Competitions
