= Jaatishwar =

2014 Indian Bengali-language film

- Directed by: Srijit Mukherji
- Written by: Srijit Mukherji
- Produced by: Reliance Entertainment and Rana Sarkar
- Starring: Prosenjit Chatterjee; Jisshu Sengupta; Swastika Mukherjee; Abir Chatterjee; Rahul Banerjee; Ananya Chatterjee; Kharaj Mukherjee; Mamata Shankar; Riya Sen; Srijit Mukherji; Biswajit Chakraborty; Bharat Kaul
- Cinematography: Soumik Haldar
- Edited by: Bodhaditya Banerjee; Pronoy Dasgupta
- Music by: Kabir Suman
- Release date: 17 January 2014 (India)
- Running time: 150 minutes
- Country: India
- Language: Bengali

Jaatishwar is a 2014 Indian Bengali-language musical psychological drama film written and directed by Srijit Mukherji. It stars Prosenjit Chatterjee, Jisshu Sengupta and Swastika Mukherjee. The main focus of the plot revolves around the life and notable works of Anthony Firingee (Hensman Anthony), a 19th-century Bengali language folk poet of Portuguese origin, along with other supporting characters. The time frame of the storyline jumps between two different periods—19th century and the present day (2013). The music of Jaatiswar is composed by Kabir Suman.

The film has been recognized as the most awarded film in the 61st National Film Awards with 4 awards in the following categories -Best Music Direction, Best Male Playback Singer, Best Costume Design and Best Make-up Artist.

== Plot ==
In the present timeline, Rohit Mehta, a Gujarati born and brought up in Calcutta, falls in love with Mahamaya Bandopadhyay and tries to woo her. Since he can just barely utter a few Bengali words (and that too in the wrong places), Mahamaya throws him a hurdle to cross - if he can write a song with correct Bengali lyrics and sing it without any accent or mistake, she would think of a possible relationship. Rohit accepts the challenge and goes to Portugal to study colonial history.

Two years pass. Mahamaya is now a radio jockey at a popular radio station. Rohit is in Portugal but still very much in love with her. His Bengali is being refined by his friend and classmate Bodhi. Rohit chooses the music course and decides to do a dissertation on the 19th Century folk poet Hensman Anthony (Anthony Firingee). He goes to Calcutta and then to Farashdanga, Chandannagar, where Anthony lived and composed his songs. He goes to the local library to get some books where he meets the assistant librarian, a mysterious man named Kushal Hajra, who claims to be the re-incarnation of Anthony himself. Kushal laments that the visions of his previous life are haunting him every day, and slowly taking over the memory of his present life. Rohit promises to take him to Calcutta for treatment, in return he demands the life history of Anthony.

The story then goes back to the 19th Century, where Anthony impresses the villagers with his musical talent. He saves a young Bengali widow, Soudamini, from performing sati and later marries her. But he yearns to learn the Bengali language and compose songs in that language. He learns it, reading Hindu scriptures and understanding the meaning of the folk compositions. In those days, kavigaans were very popular in Calcutta, where two kaviyaals or folk poets would face each other with their respective groups and compete with each other through songs and poems. Anthony was impressed by the kavigaans and decided to form a group on his own. He used to compose the songs himself, and on the first occasion met the woman kaviyaal, Joggeshwari, whom he defeats. Slowly, as he began to progress in his career as a kaviyaal, he competed with noted kaviyaals of the time like Ram Basu and Thakur Singha.

Simultaneously, in the present timeline, Kushal is taken to a psychiatrist, where he is informed that to stop the visions, he must complete a work which he could not possibly do as Anthony. Kushal's visions get stronger and stronger. Rohit meanwhile has found a way to sing his latest Bengali composition in front of Mahamaya, whose radio company has decided to organize a competition among bands hailing both from West Bengal and Bangladesh, "Bandemonium". Bodhi, who meanwhile had come to Calcutta to meet Rohit, takes him to Sidhu (playing himself) to arrange musicians for Rohit's performance. Meanwhile, Mahamaya had also started developing feelings for Rohit.

Kushal reveals to Rohit the story of Anthony's last kavigaan. Anthony had been planning to do a Durga-puja all by himself. But the villagers were against this, as, to them, Anthony is a firingee (foreigner) who had no right to perform a Hindu puja. He tells Soudamini that he is going to Calcutta for another kavigaan, and so won't be staying during the days of the puja. As planned, he leaves for Calcutta on the day of the puja. This time, his competition is with the best kaviyaal, Bhola Moira. The competition heightens and Anthony wins after a tough fight.

In the present timeline, the day of "Bandemonium" has arrived. Rohit goes on stage and performs his Bengali song E Tumi Kemon Tumi as Mahamaya looks on, tears in her eyes. Within the song, the film goes back to the 19th Century. After Anthony returned from Calcutta, victorious against Bhola Moira, he finds his house and his Durga idol set on fire by the villagers. He finds Soudamini dead and nobody around. With his love killed and his faith shattered, he digs a grave for her, and then for himself (as he had once promised jokingly to his wife).

During the show, Bodhi brings Kushal to the auditorium to see the performance of Rohit. Kushal meets Mahamaya, and then leaves abruptly. After the performance, Rohit and Mahamaya profess their love for each other backstage. Rohit suddenly is informed that Kushal is missing. He, along with Mahamaya, goes to Kushal's house in Chandannagar, where they find him completely insane and lost in his visions. He attacks Rohit and then blabbers rubbish. Rohit, heartbroken, leaves with Mahamaya, realising that Kushal is beyond cure now. The film then ends with a final twist, revealing Mahamaya as the reincarnation of Soudamini, though she remembers nothing of her previous birth. Anthony had wanted to apologize to his wife for leaving her alone to get killed by the neighbours, which Kushal does after Mahamaya leaves with Rohit. The visions will not haunt him anymore. The film ends as Kabir Suman's song "Jaatishwar" plays in the background.

== Cast ==
- Prosenjit Chatterjee in dual roles as
  - Kushal Hajra
  - Hensman Anthony aka Anthony Firingee (voice by Srikanto Acharya)
- Jisshu Sengupta as Rohit Mehta
- Swastika Mukherjee in dual roles as
  - Mahamaya Bandyopadhyay aka Maya
  - Soudamini, wife of Hensman Anthony
- Abir Chatterjee as Bodhi ( Guest Appearance)
- Rahul Banerjee as Amitava (Guest Appearance)
- Riya Sen as Sudeshna (Guest Appearance)
- Mamata Shankar as Mahamaya's mother (Guest Appearance)
- Ananya Chatterjee as Joggeshwari (Special Appearance)
- Sumit Samaddar as Gourhari, an angry villager
- Dwijen Bandopadhyay as the village priest
- Kharaj Mukherjee as Bhola Moira
- Tamal Roychowdhury as Horu Thakur
- Kalikaprasad Bhattacharya as Lalon (unnamed in the film)
- Biswajit Chakraborty as Thakur Singha
- Neel Mukherjee as Ram Basu
- Srijit Mukherji as Bikram Botobyal aka Vicky, Mahamaya's boss
- Dr. Kaushik Ghosh as Dr. Sengupta
- Bharat Kaul as Rohit's father
- Chaitali Dasgupta as Rohit's mother
- Sumant M Sarkar as Librarian
- Kabir Suman as himself
- Anindya Chatterjee as himself
- Rupam Islam as himself
- Siddhartha Roy (Sidhu) as himself
- Anupam Roy as himself
- Debleena Sen as Girl ar radio station

== Soundtrack ==
Kabir Suman is the music director of the film, while Indradip Dasgupta is the assistant music director. All the kabigaans of the film is included in the album. The kabigaans bring back a long lost era of Bengali music through this film. Curiously, the song Jaatishwar which is taken from Kabir Suman's own album Jaatishwar (1997), is not included in the soundtrack, but is used during the end credits of the film, probably to emphasize on the protagonist's state of mind.

=== Track list ===
#	Title	Notes	Singer(s)
1	"Joy Jogendra"	Anthony's Agomoni Song	Srikanto Acharya
2	"Sohosa Ele Ki"	Rohit's composition	Rupankar Bagchi
3	"Hole Jodi Hole Sokha"	Joggeshwari to Anthony	Sromona Chakraborty
4	"Je Shokti"	Anthony to Bhola Moira	Srikanto Acharya
5	"E Tumi Kemon Tumi"	Rohit's composition	Rupankar Bagchi
6	"Chinta Naai"	Bhola Moira to Anthony	Kharaj Mukherjee
7	"Preme Khanto Holem"	Anthony to Bhola Moira	Srikanto Acharya
8	"Faka Frame"	used in the film from Anupam Roy's own album	Anupam Roy
9	"Khriste Aar Krishte"	Anthony to Bhola Moira	Srikanto Acharya
10	"Tui Jaat Firingi"	Bhola Moira to Anthony	Kharaj Mukherjee
11	"No Puedo" (Spanish Folk Song)	Anthony's song	Dibyendu Mukherjee
12	"Bolo Hey Antony"	Thakur Singha to Anthony	Kabir Suman
13	"Ei Banglay"	Anthony to Thakur Singha	Srikanto Acharya
14	"Singho Rashi"	Bandemonium Rock song	Siddhartha Roy (Sidhu)
15	"Ekhon Bujhli Toh"	Ram Basu to Horu Thakur	Manomoy Bhattacharya
16	"Pran Tumi Aar"	Anthony to Joggeshwari	Srikanto Acharya
17	"Bolo Konta Priyo"	Bandemonium Rock song	Saqi
18	"Age Jodi"	Horu Thakur to Nilu Thakur	Suman Mukherjee
19	"Jaat Gelo Bole"	Lalon's song	Kalikaprasad Bhattacharjee
20	"Ki Rongo Tui"	Anthony to Ram Basu	Srikanto Acharya
21	"E Tumi Kemon Tumi" (Reprise)	not in the film	Saptarshi Mukherjee
22	"Khudar Kasam Jaan"	opening credits song	Kabir Suman
23	"Omorotter Prottasha Nei"	end credits song	Kabir Suman

== Reception ==
The film was released on 17 January 2014 in India and received positive critical reviews. It is hailed as one of the best works of Srijit Mukherji and Prosenjit Chatterjee. The film had a special screening for the President of India Pranab Mukherjee on 15 January 2014 in Rashtrapati Bhavan in New Delhi. The film was among a shortlist of eight films from India in the race for submission to the 87th Academy Awards for Best Foreign Language Film.

== Awards ==
Ceremony	Category	Nominee	Result
61st National Film Awards	Best Male Playback Singer	Rupankar Bagchi for the song E Tumi Kemon Tumi	Won
61st National Film Awards	Best Music Direction	Kabir Suman	Won
61st National Film Awards	Best Make-up Artist	Vikram Gaikwad	Won
61st National Film Awards	Best Costume Design	Shaborni Das	Won
4th Royal Stag Mirchi Music awards Bangla 2014	Song Of The Year	E Tumi Kemon Tumi	Won
4th Royal Stag Mirchi Music awards Bangla 2014	Male Vocalist of the Year	Rupankar Bagchi for the song E Tumi Kemon Tumi	Won
4th Royal Stag Mirchi Music awards Bangla 2014	Music Director of the Year	Kabir Suman for the song E Tumi Kemon Tumi	Won
4th Royal Stag Mirchi Music awards Bangla 2014	Album of the Year	Jaatishwar	Won
4th Royal Stag Mirchi Music awards Bangla 2014	Lyricist Of The Year	Kabir Suman for the song Khudar Kasam Jaan	Won
4th Royal Stag Mirchi Music awards Bangla 2014	Listener's Choice Song Of The Year	E Tumi Kemon Tumi	Won
4th Royal Stag Mirchi Music awards Bangla 2014	Listener's Choice Album of the Year	Jaatishwar	Won
