= Madhabilata Mitra =

- Born: Kolkata
- Occupation: Model

Madhabilata Mitra is a ramp model. She was crowned as Sananda Tilottama 2006.

== Early life ==
She was born in a middle-class family in Kolkata (16 December). She & Her Brother Arka grew up with single Parenthood of Mother Sanjukta.and grew up studying Arts. In the year 2006 on 27 May she won a beauty contest Sananda Tilottama and she started off her career since then.

== Career ==
Mitra has participated in the Blenders Pride Fashion Tour, the Indian Leather Products Association (ILPA) Show, Ritu Kumar, and the International Institute of Fashion Design. She has also won a title as ''Miss hot body'' in the year 2009.

== Personal life ==
Madhabilata got married on 20 January 2014 with her long time boyfriend Bhupesh Gupta.
