= Sourabh Goho =

Indian Tabla Player (born 1991)

Sourabh Goho সৌরভ গোহো
- Born: 21 January 1991 (age 35); Kolkata, West Bengal, India
- Genres: Hindustani Classical, Fusion Music
- Occupations: Musician, Tabla Player, Collaborator
- Years active: 2009–present

Sourabh Goho (Bengali: সৌরভ গোহো) is an Indian Tabla Player who performs Hindustani classical music and fusion music. He belongs to Farukhabad gharana. He is the son of renowned Harmonium Maestro, Pt. Jyoti Goho.

== Early life ==
Sourabh was born in Kolkata, West Bengal to the Harmonium maestro, Pt. Jyoti Goho and Vocalist Mrs. Bandana Goho. He studied up to class XII (10+2) from The Future Foundation School, Kolkata. He completed a Bachelor of Commerce (Honours) in Accountancy from the University of Calcutta. Between 2014 and 2016, he pursued a Master of Business Administration at The Heritage Business School, Kolkata. Goho began learning tabla at the age of seven under the guidance of tabla maestro Pandit Shankar Ghosh, and later continued his training with Pandit Bickram Ghosh.

== Career ==
Sourabh started performing professionally in various concerts from the year 2009. He played his international debut concert at Shanghai, China in 2013. He has played tabla solo concerts at various prestigious venues in Kolkata like - ITC Sangeet Research Academy, Ramakrishna Mission Institute of Culture Golpark, Bhowanipore Sangeet Sammilani and at All India Tabla Conference at Secunderabad (Telangana) among others. He played Jaaz Concert at India Habitat Center, New Delhi for American Institute of Indian Studies, World Music Concert at The Oberoi, New Delhi. In 2015 he has played classical concerts in India Habitat Center (New Delhi), Epicenter (Gurgaon) and Rabindra Sadan (Kolkata) among others. Sourabh conducted a tabla workshop at Mathieson Music School, Kolkata. In November 2014 he accompanied his father Pt. Jyoti Goho in his Harmonium solo concert at Indore, Madhya Pradesh.
