= AMRI Hospitals =

Hospital chain in India and Bangladesh

- AMRI Hospitals Ltd

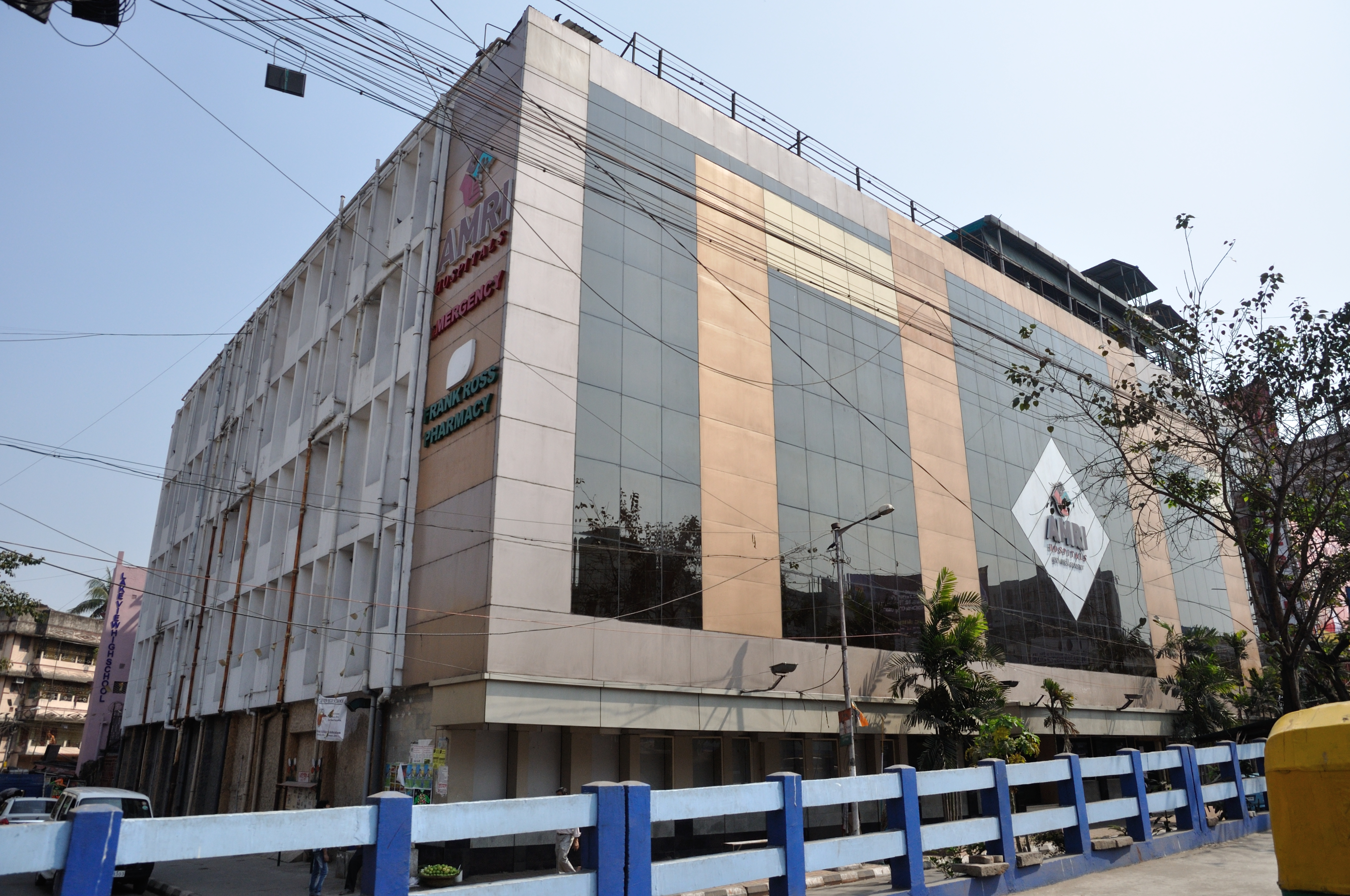
- The Advanced Medical Research Institute, Dhakuria, Kolkata

Geography
- Location: Kolkata, West Bengal, India

Organisation
- Care system: Private hospital
- Type: General
- Patron: Manipal Hospitals; Emami Group

Services
- Standards: NABH
- Emergency department: Yes (Trauma center)
- Beds: 1,200

History
- Founded: 1996; 30 years ago; at Kolkata, India

Links
- Website: Official website

AMRI Hospitals is a for-profit private hospital chain which is headquartered in the city of Kolkata, West Bengal, India. In September 2023, Manipal Hospitals acquired a majority stake (84%) in the company.

With hospitals accredited by NABH, the company has 3 units in Kolkata (Dhakuria, Salt Lake and Mukundapur), 1 clinic in Kolkata (Southern Avenue) and 1 unit in Bhubaneshwar in the Indian State of Odisha. It had also opened a health center in Dhaka for its Bangladeshi patients.

== History ==
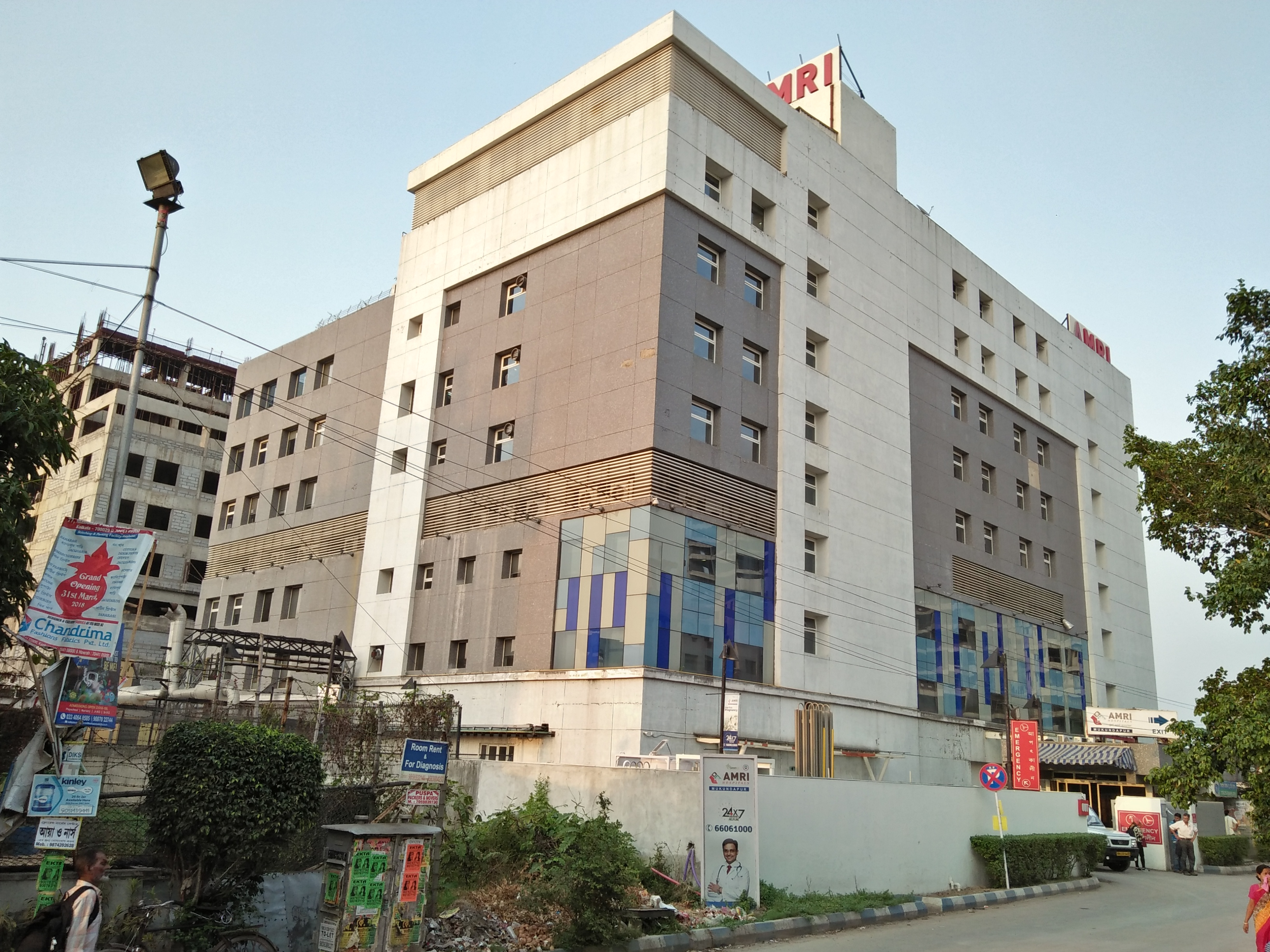
AMRI Hospital, Mukundapur, Kolkata

The Emami Group invested in hospitals with Shrachi Group through an invitation from Shrachi Group's Shrawan Kumar Todi, a family friend. The Government of West Bengal handed control of a polyclinic in Dhakuria to AMRI Hospitals in the early 90s.

AMRI Hospitals was co-founded by the Emami Group and Shrachi Group in 1996, two of Kolkata's developing groups, in a partnership with the Government of West Bengal to expand health coverage options for consumers. It was a centre for training students from the Institute of Radiology and Medical Imaging. The hospital chain was/is ISO 9001:2000 certified.

In 2006, AMRI Hospitals acquired Suraksha Hospitals, and renamed it as AMRI Hospitals, Salt Lake. After 2 years, the hospital was merged to leverage operational synergies by forming AMRI Hospitals. The Emami group acquired 32% stake of Shrachi Group in AMRI Hospitals in the year 2014.

In September 2023, Manipal Hospitals announced that it had acquired 80% of AMRI Hospitals for ₹2400 crores. On 15 May 2024, AMRI Hospitals was absorbed and integrated into the 'Manipal' brand.

== Specialties ==
The specialties at AMRI Hospitals include Aesthetic, Reconstructive & Plastic Surgery, Blood Bank & Transfusion Medicine, Cardiac Sciences, Dentistry & Maxillo Facial Surgery, Dermatology, Dietetics and Nutrition, Emergency Critical Care & Trauma Management, Endocrinology & Diabetology, ENT & Head Neck Surgery, Gastro Sciences, General and Minimally Invasive Surgery, Internal Medicine, IVF, Neuro Sciences, Nuclear Medicine & PET-CT, Obstetrics & Gynaecology, Onco Sciences, Ophthalmology, Orthopaedics & Joint Replacement, Paediatrics & Neonatology, Physiotherapy & Rehabilitation Medicine, Psychiatry, Pulmonology & Chest Medicine, Radiology & Interventional Radiology, Rheumatology, Urology & Nephrology.

== Legal controversies ==
=== Anuradha Saha case ===
On 24 October 2013, the Supreme Court of India ordered AMRI Hospitals to pay compensation for medical negligence at their hospital in Kolkata that led to the death of Anuradha Saha, a US-based child psychologist, on 28 May 1998. The court described the standard of medical care at the hospital as "abysmal", and wrote that the court's decision was intended as a "deterrent and a reminder" to the medical community. The compensation, which with interest came to Rs. 11.41 crore (US$1.86 million in 2013), was the highest ever awarded by an Indian court for medical negligence.

=== Fire incident ===
A fire at the hospital occurred at Dhakuria in South Kolkata in the early morning of 9 December 2011. The fire was due to a short circuit in the electrical system. Ninety-five people, including members of the staff, died due to asphyxiation. Six board members were then released on bail after a temporary arrest. The Dhakuria Unit of AMRI Hospitals reopened operations two years later after it received clearance in November 2013.
