= Srikanta Acharya =

Indian singer-songwriter

Srikanta Acharya শ্রীকান্ত আচার্য
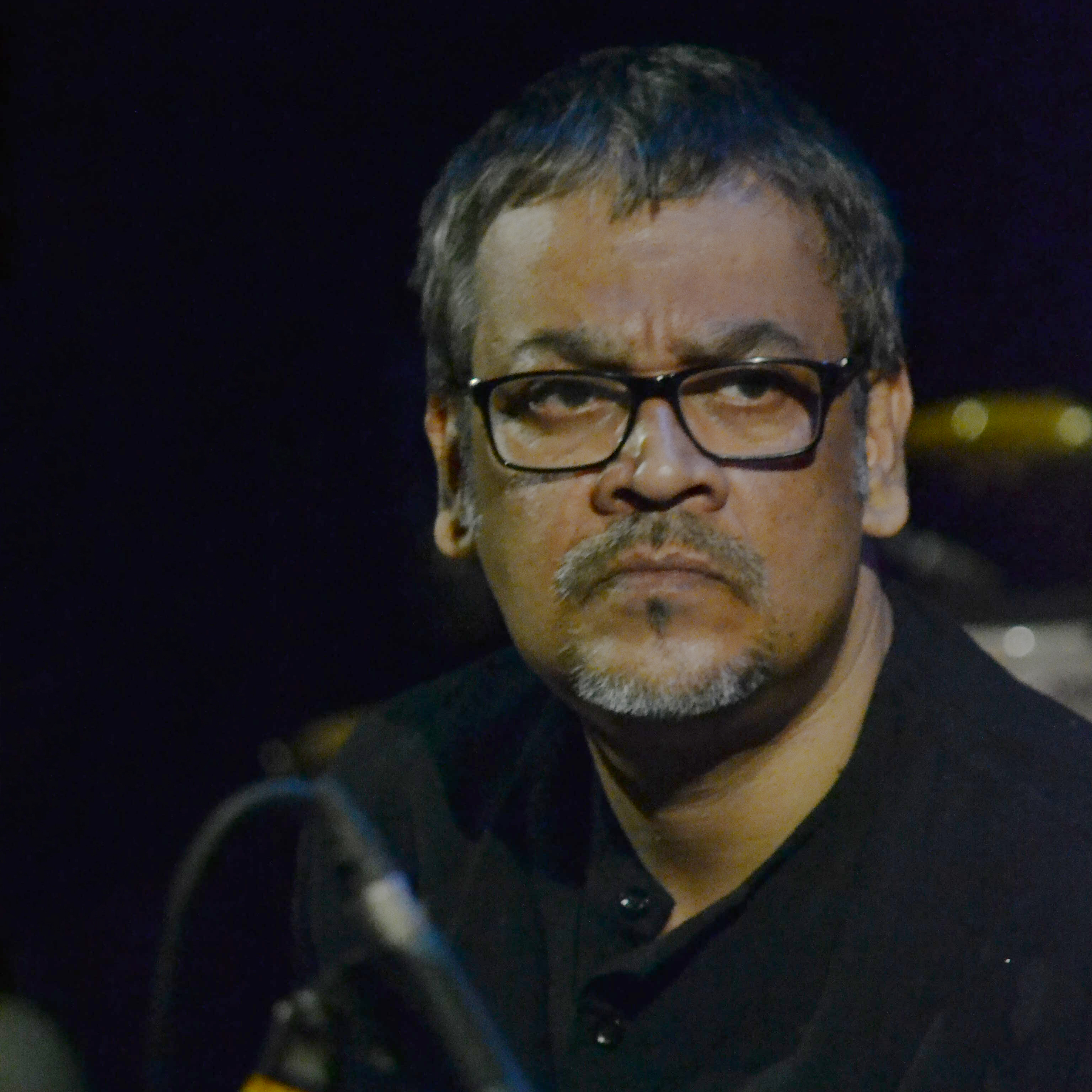
- Acharya in 2015

Background information
- Also known as: Srikanta Da, Acharya Babu
- Born: Kolkata, West Bengal, India
- Origin: Kolkata, West Bengal, India
- Genres: Adhunik Bengali Songs, Rabindra Sangeet
- Occupation: Singer
- Instruments: Vocal; Tabla; Harmonium; Bongos
- Years active: 1996–present
- Label: Sagarika Height - 191 cm ( 6 ft 3 in )

Srikanta Acharya is an Indian singer-songwriter and music director. Acharya primarily sings contemporary Bengali songs and is one of the most prominent exponents of Rabindra Sangeet.

== Early life ==
Srikanta Acharya was born in Kolkata, India and is the son of Rohini Nandan Acharya and Kana Acharya. He received formal training in Rabindrasangeet from Dakshinee. He also received training in tabla from Ustad Ali Ahmed Khan. He quit his job as a sales professional and then Utpal Chakravarty, proprietor of an old music store, convinced him to send his cassettes to Sagarika Music.

== Discography ==
=== Bengali albums ===
- Ek Jhank Pakhi (1998, Sagarika)
- Swapno Dekhao Tumi (1999, Sagarika)
- Brishti Tomake Dilam (2000, Sagarika )
- Nadir Chhobi Aanki (2001, Sagarika)
- Mone Pore (2002, Sagarika)
- Sudhu Valo Theko (2003, Atlantis Music)
- Kachhei Achhi (2003, Sagarika)
- Ghuri (2004, Sagarika)
- Sonar Meye (2005, Prime Music)
- Roddur (2006, Sa Re Ga Ma)
- Aami Noi (2008, Srikanta Acharya Productions)
- Ghum Nei Raat (2008, Saregama, with Kavita Krishnamurty, Rupankar)
- Musafirana (2011, Orion Entertainment)
- Musafirana 2 (2016, Srikanta Acharya Productions)

=== Rabindrasangeet albums ===
- Hey Bandhu Hey Priyo (1996, Sagarika)
- Anubhabe Jenechhilem (1997, Sagarika)
- Nivrito Praner Debota (1998, Sagarika )
- Nirabo Nirjane (1999, Sagarika)
- Prem Esechhilo (2000, Sagarika)
- Hridoy Aamar (2001, Sagarika)
- Roudro Chhayay (2002, Sagarika)
- Pather Dhare (2006, Bhavna Records)
- Chirosakha (2009, Sagarika)
- Bajao Tumi Kabi (2010, T-Series)
- Anek Diner Gaan (2014, Picasso Entertainment)
- Ei Niralai (2014, Bhavna Records)

=== Rabindrasangeet Duet albums ===
- Valobasi (2001, Sagarika, With Sriradha Bandyopadhyay)
- Milechho Mor Prane (2002, Sagarika, With Lopamudra Mitra)

=== Rabindrasangeet Other albums ===
- Aapon Gaan, Vol – 1 (2000, Bhavana, With Soumitra Chatterjee)
- Aapon Gaan, Vol – 2 (Bhavana, With Soumitra Chatterjee)
- Chitrangada (2002, Sagarika, Geeti Natya)
- Pather Sathi (2003, Sagarika, With Dr. Rajib Chakraborty)
- Uttaran (2011, Srikanta Acharya Productions, With Sraboni Sen & Ratna Mitra)

=== Cover albums ===
- Moner Janala (1996, Sagarika)
- Neel Dhrubatara (1997, Sagarika)
- Kono Ekdin (1998, Sagarika)
- Uttaradhikar (2003, Sagarika)

=== Cover Duet albums ===
- Sudhu Dujone (1998, Sagarika, With Sadhana Sargam)
- Enkechi Dujone (1999, Sagarika, With Sadhana Sargam)

=== Devotional albums ===
- Ma Aamar (1999, Sagarika)
- Sri Sri Ramkrishnayan (2000, Sagarika)
- Sadhananjali (2001, Sagarika)
- Amar Prem (1998, Sagarika)
- Offering (2001, Rhyme Records)

=== Films ===
Year	Title	Film	Director
2001	Megh Piyon	Titli	Rituparno Ghosh
2002	Momo Chittey Niti Nritye	Aamar Bhuvan	Mrinal Sen
2004	Jobono Moroner Simana Chharaye	Waarish	Koushik Ganguly
2005	Jokhon Porbe Na Mor	Shubhodrishti	Probhat Roy
2007	Jadi Tare Nai Chini Go, Ei Aamar Pitribhumi	Pitribhumi	Probhat Roy
2008	Na Na Na Na Tomake Charte Parbo Na	Priyojon	Dinen Gupta
2008	Khela Khela Diye Shuru	Khela	Rituparno Ghosh
2008	Amaro Porano, Keteche Ekela, Purano Sei, Dure Kothao	Mon Amour: Shesher Kobita Revisited	Subhrajit Mitra
2014	Ki Rongo, Pran Tumi, Khriste Aar Krishte, Preme Klanto, Joy Jogendra	Jaatishwar	Srijit Mukherjee
2014	Chirosokha He	Chotushkone	Srijit Mukherjee
2016	Ami Moner, Shoi Amar, Emon Mohono, Tomra Dyekho Go, Purbo Paschim, Mon Pakhi	Maya Mridanga	Raja Sen
2018	Abar Bhorer Por notun shokal	Shankar Mudi	Aniket Chattopadhyay

== Awards ==
- Outstanding Young Person's Award for his achievements in Music awarded by the North Calcutta Junior Chamber

=== 2000 ===
- Anandabazar Award for Best Puja Album of the Year - Brishti Tomake Dilam

=== 2001 ===
- Anandabazar Award for Best Puja Album of the Year - Nodir Chhobi Anki
- Anandalok Award for Best Male Vocal - Nodir Chhobi Anki

=== 2003 ===
- Anandalok Award: Best Male Playback Singer - "Momo Chitte Niti Nritye" in Aamar Bhuvan
- Bengal Film Journalists' Association - Best Male Playback Award - "Megh Pion-er Bag-er Bhitor" in Titli

=== 2004 ===
- Anandabazar Award for Best Puja Album of the Year - Ghuri
- Alpha Music Award for Best Rabindrasangeet Album - Jibon Chhobi

=== 2006 ===
- Anandabazar Award for Best Puja Album of the Year - Roddur

== See also ==
- Prabhat Samgiita
