= Sukanta Basu =

Indian painter

Sukanta Basu (pronounced: SukOnto ba:su, born 1929 in Calcutta) is a non-representational painter of Indian origin, who has also worked as an art conservator. He lives and paints in Kolkata (former Calcutta), West Bengal. While his early works were mainly oils and sketchy portraits, Basu later worked with acrylics on canvas and occasionally pencil or charcoal drawings.

== Personal life ==
Sukanta Basu was born in Calcutta (now Kolkata) on 13 June 1929 to the scientist (Chemistry) Rajani Kanta Basu and Sneha Sarit Basu. For part of his childhood he was raised in Muzaffarpur in North Bihar, where his father had a permanent post in the British India's Bihar Educational Service. The family moved to Bankura, West Bengal, for a few years due to threat of Japanese attack.

=== Education ===
While Basu was still in school in Bankura, he earned the affectionate nickname Chitrakar (painter/artist) from the Bengali scholar Acharya Jogesh Chandra Ray Vidyanidhi who also lived in Bankura. After his matriculation, Basu went to college in Calcutta, but soon dropped out feeling alienated in the system. He took some time away from institutional education, later passed his intermediate science exam and joined the Chemistry Honours programme at St. Xavier's college, Calcutta. Basu experienced a lack of interest and got involved with student politics; he dropped out again. Finally, he prepared himself to practice arts, and attended the Indian Art School for a few months, in order to prepare himself for the Government College of Art and Craft at the University of Calcutta.

At art school, he trained under artist Prodosh Das Gupta. As schoolmates, Bijon Chowdhury, Somnath Hore and Sukanta Basu were friends during this period. When the student's movement in Bengal became very intense, and the Communist Party of India was banned under B.C. Roy's regime, Somnath Hore and Bijon Chowdhury had to leave school. The three remained close friends even thereafter. Basu graduated in 1954.

== Career ==
Basu had difficulties to maintain a fluent course as a full-time artist, and did survival jobs for his basic upkeep and materials. On graduating from art school in 1954, Basu joined B.N. Academy in a small town called Suri, Birbhum district, as a drawing teacher. By the autumn break Basu fell ill and could not return to Suri to his job. By the year end, he joined a printing press- Calcutta Chromotype in Calcutta. There he engaged with technical aspects of colour analysis and feasibility testing. After a year of working with the press, Basu was jobless as a result of a lock-out at the factory. His friend and well-wisher Dilip Das Gupta got him a teaching job at the Indian Art College where he worked alongside his old friend Somnath Hore.

In 1959 Basu applied to the National Gallery of Modern Art, New Delhi for the post of a conservator, was appointed and worked with the gallery until his retirement in 1985. He is the first appointed conservator in India.

Basu was sent to Rome, Italy to be trained for a year in 1960 and in 1977 for a month in London at the Courtauld Institute of Art.

In the early 1980s, Sotheby's claimed works by European artists including Thomas Daniell, which Prime Minister Indira Gandhi almost agreed to give away. Basu was part of the group which opposed this move, and worked to retain these works which were then categorized as 'Indian Art of European Origin'. He also played a significant part in the creation of The National Museum Institute of History of Art, Conservation and Museology in 1983.

Basu has handled some of the most controversial works of Amrita Sher-Gil (donated to NGMA by her sister Indira Sundaram) at the outset of his conservation career, and has restored valuable works by the Bengal school of art, Jamini Roy, Tagore, Petar Lubarda among others, now part of the gallery's permanent collection.

During his tenure, he was an advisor and friend to artists like Vasudeo S. Gaitonde, Biren De, and close friends with Tyeb Mehta, who helped Basu exhibit his works in Pundole gallery (former Bombay). Basu continued to paint and showed his works in New Delhi and Bombay, but from the late 1970s to circa 1997 he was dormant as a painter, because of his position at National Gallery of Modern Art, and from 1983 at the National Museum, New Delhi.

In 1990, Basu set up the New Delhi unit of the Indian National Trust for Art and Cultural Heritage (INTACH). He worked there till his retirement from conservation in 1997.

Basu began painting again in the late 1990s. Since then, he has occasionally been showing his work in New Delhi, Kolkata and Pune.

== Art ==
Until the early 1960s Basu worked with oils on canvas rendering landscapes, made sketchy portraits and drawings, he then turned to non-representational works. While the range of Basu's works may be thematically located within post-colonial and post-modern, his style remains distinct and difficult to label as such. None of his works are titled.

His works are characterized by an appearance of vastness, regardless of the canvas dimension. Post 1960s, one sees a consistent engagement with an unknown source of light, in an attempt to decipher the grammar of an art, which does not need words to support it. The artist is prudent in terms of adventurous experimentation, and minimalistic; his works seldom have more than three colours, and he does not use a palette or an easel. Instead of colour, line and form as primary requirements, Basu's approach uses colour and surface as foundational elements.
