= List of people from West Bengal =

This is a list of notable people from West Bengal, India. This list does not include the significant number of prominent East Bengali refugees from East Bengal who settled in West Bengal after the partition of the Indian sub-continent in 1947.

== Literature ==
=== Major figures ===
- Bibhutibhushan Bandyopadhyay
- Manik Bandopadhyay
- Sharadindu Bandyopadhyay
- Tarasankar Bandyopadhyay
- Rajshekhar Basu
- Suchitra Bhattacharya
- Shibram Chakraborty
- Amiya Chakravarty
- Bankim Chandra Chatterjee
- Sarat Chandra Chattopadhyay
- Pramatha Chaudhuri
- Ashapurna Devi
- Mahasweta Devi
- Michael Madhusudan Dutt
- Sudhindranath Dutta
- Joy Goswami
- Kazi Nazrul Islam
- Samaresh Majumdar
- Premendra Mitra
- Mimi Mondal
- Ashutosh Mukhopadhyay
- Shirshendu Mukhopadhyay
- Annada Shankar Ray
- Satyajit Ray
- Narayan Sanyal
- Syed Mustafa Siraj
- Rabindranath Tagore

=== Children's story writers ===
- Sasthipada Chattopadhyay
- Shibram Chakraborty
- Upendrakishore Ray Chowdhury
- Anish Deb
- Narayan Debnath
- Narayan Gangopadhyay
- Sunil Gangopadhyay
- Leela Majumdar
- Samaresh Majumdar
- Premendra Mitra
- Shirshendu Mukhopadhyay
- Sourav Mukhopadhyay
- Moti Nandi
- Sukumar Ray
- Hemendra Kumar Roy
- Syed Mustafa Siraj

=== Medieval Bengal literary scene ===
- Nur Qutb Alam
- Maladhar Basu
- Ghanaram Chakrabarty
- Mukundaram Chakrabarti
- Rupram Chakrabarty
- Chandidas
- Kashiram Das
- Govindadasa
- Krishnadasa Kaviraja
- Ketakadas Kshemananda
- Dvija Madhab
- Krittibas Ojha
- Ramai Pandit
- Bipradas Pipilai
- Bharatchandra Ray
- Vidyapati

=== Other authors from early modern period ===
- Akshay Kumar Baral
- Manoranjan Byapari
- Nirupama Devi
- Swarnakumari Devi
- Romesh Chunder Dutt
- Anil Kumar Gain
- Dipak Giri
- Ishwar Chandra Gupta
- Peary Chand Mitra
- Parijat
- Indra Bahadur Rai
- Dwijendralal Ray
- Begum Rokeya
- Kaliprasanna Singha
- Jyotirindranath Tagore
- Swami Vivekananda

=== Prominent foreign-language authors from Bengal ===
- Sri Aurobindo
- Anirban Bhattacharyya
- Upamanyu Chatterjee
- Amit Chaudhuri
- Souhardya De
- Chitra Banerjee Divakaruni
- Toru Dutt
- Kaberi Gayen
- Amitav Ghosh
- Dipak Giri
- Jhumpa Lahiri
- Mimi Mondal
- Pritish Nandy

=== Other authors from early/mid-twentieth century and some contemporary authors ===
- Anita Agnihotri
- Ekram Ali
- Afsar Amed
- Jatindramohan Bagchi
- Tarasankar Bandyopadhyay
- Tapan Bandyopadhyay
- Subimal Basak
- Abul Bashar
- Sukanta Bhattacharya
- Nachiketa Chakraborty
- Nirendranath Chakravarty
- Shibram Chakraborty
- Smaranjit Chakraborty
- Sandipan Chattopadhyay
- Sanjib Chattopadhyay
- Sasthipada Chattopadhyay
- Shakti Chattopadhyay
- Malay Roy Choudhury
- Salil Chowdhury
- Alokeranjan Dasgupta
- Buddhadeb Dasgupta
- Anish Deb
- Nabaneeta Dev Sen
- Mahasweta Devi
- Anil Kumar Gain
- Kaberi Gayen
- Narayan Gangopadhyay
- Joy Goswami
- Prabir Ghosh
- Santosh Kumar Ghosh
- Shankha Ghosh
- Subodh Ghosh
- Dipak Giri
- Buddhadeb Guha
- Pracheta Gupta
- Baby Halder
- Moinul Hassan
- Syed Kawsar Jamal
- Humayun Kabir
- Bimal Kar
- Binoy Majumdar
- Samaresh Majumdar
- Tarun Mandal
- Amar Mitra
- Arun Mitra
- Bimal Mitra
- Narendranath Mitra
- Ashutosh Mukhopadhyay
- Bibhutibhushan Mukhopadhyay
- Subhash Mukhopadhyay
- Kumud Ranjan Mullick
- Moti Nandi
- Purnendu Pattrea
- Sheikh Abdur Rahim
- Dilipkumar Roy
- Samir Roychoudhury
- Sankar
- Narayan Sanyal
- Subodh Sarkar
- Jatindranath Sengupta
- Mallika Sengupta
- Syed Mustafa Siraj

=== Journalists ===
- Ekram Ali
- Tamal Bandyopadhyay
- Mrinal Chatterjee
- Ramananda Chatterjee
- Sunanda K. Datta-Ray
- Tushar Kanti Ghosh
- Chandan Mitra
- Moti Nandi
- Pritish Nandy
- Sukumar Ray
- Barun Sengupta

=== Comics writers ===
- Narayan Debnath

== Language/linguistics, anthropology, history, and other social sciences ==
- Haricharan Bandopadhayaya, lexicographer
- Rajshekhar Basu, major contributor for scientific terms in Bengali and lexicographer
- Chandril Bhattacharya, born in Kolkata
- Girindrasekhar Bose, first non-European correspondent of Freud
- Nirmal Kumar Bose, anthropologist, associate of Gandhi
- Suniti Kumar Chatterji, linguist
- Debiprasad Chattopadhyaya, social philosopher
- Kirti N. Chaudhuri, historian
- Pramatha Chaudhuri, creator of modern Bengali prose (chalit bhasha) along with Tagore
- Harinath De, linguist
- Romesh Chunder Dutt, historian
- Anil Kumar Gain, fellow of the Royal Society
- Dipak Giri, Indian sociologist
- Biraja Sankar Guha, anthropologist
- Ranajit Guha, subaltern theorist
- R. C. Majumdar, historian
- Vina Mazumdar, women's studies academic
- Rajendralal Mitra, first Indian to work with Indologists
- Bhudev Mukhopadhyay, earliest educationist
- Niharranjan Ray, historian
- Hem Chandra Raychaudhuri, Indian historian
- Tapan Raychaudhuri, professor of history at Oxford University
- Raja Ram Mohan Roy, first Bengali prose writer
- Jadunath Sarkar, historian
- Sumit Sarkar, historian
- Susobhan Sarkar, historian
- Amartya Sen, Nobel Prize awardee in Economics
- Dinesh Chandra Sen, historian of Bengali literature and folklorist
- Sukumar Sen, linguist
- Hara Prasad Shastri, historian of Bengali language and culture
- Maniklal Sinha, novelist, historian and archaeologist of west Rarh
- Surajit Chandra Sinha, anthropologist
- Dineshchandra Sircar, epigraphist
- Gayatri Chakravorty Spivak, literature theorist.
- Ishwar Chandra Vidyasagar, creator of Standard Bengali prose (sadhu bhasha)

=== Scholars and polymaths ===
- Asima Chatterjee, scholar of chemistry
- Suniti Kumar Chatterji, linguist
- Amlan Datta, economist, Vice Chancellor of Visva Bharati
- Radhakanta Deb, linguist
- Anil Kumar Gain, scholar, mathematician
- Dipak Giri, scholar, English literature and sociology
- Prithwindra Mukherjee, scholar of Indian history, philosophy, religion and culture
- Ashis Nandy, political psychologist
- Ramendra Sundar Tribedi, scientist

== Education ==
=== Pioneers ===
- Mahesh Chandra Nyayratna Bhattacharyya
- Girish Chandra Bose
- Anil Kumar Gain
- Muhammad Mohsin
- Ashutosh Mukherjee
- Satish Chandra Mukherjee
- Begum Rokeya
- Guruchand Thakur
- Ishwar Chandra Vidyasagar

=== Post-independence ===
- Shuddhaanandaa Brahmachari
- Sudhi Ranjan Das, Chief Justice of India, Vice-chancellor of Visva Bharati
- Azizul Haque

=== Teachers ===
- Babar Ali, world's youngest headmaster, headmaster and founder of Ananda Siksha Niketan
- Katyayanidas Bhattacharya, philosophy, Presidency College
- Ramkrishna Bhattacharya, English, Ananda Mohan College
- Barun De, history, Presidency College
- Mahasweta Devi, English, Vijaygarh Jyotish Ray College
- Chinmoy Guha, English, Vijaygarh Jyotish Ray College and University of Calcutta
- K. C. Nag, mathematics, Mitra institution
- Susobhan Sarkar, history, Presidency College

== Philosophy ==
=== Pre-modern period ===
- Chaitanya Mahaprabhu (Achintya Bhedabheda Vedanta) born in Nabadwip of Nadia district to parents who hailed from Sylhet in present day Bangladesh
- Madhusūdana Sarasvatī (Advaita Vedanta), born in Kotalipara, Gopalganj District in present day Bangladesh & studied at Nabadwip in Nadia district
- Raghunatha Shiromani (Navya Nyaya) from Nabadwip

=== Modern age ===
- Sri Aurobindo
- Abu Sayeed Ayyub, born in Kolkata
- Krishna Chandra Bhattacharya born in Serampore in Howrah district
- Anukulchandra Chakravarty born in Pabna district in present day Bangladesh, worked & preached in Kolkata. After the Partition of India in 1947, he relocated to Deoghar
- Surendranath Dasgupta, born in Kusthia of present day Bangladesh which was then a part of Nadia before Partition of India, studied in Kolkata
- Balaram Hari, born in Nadia
- Bimal Krishna Matilal, born in Jaynagar Majilpur in South 24 Parganas district
- Amartya Sen, born in Shantiniketan in Birbhum District
- Keshub Chandra Sen, born in Kolkata
- Rabindranath Tagore, born in Kolkata
- Swami Vivekananda, born in Kolkata

=== Early / Mid twenty century ===
- Shuddhaanandaa Brahmachari, born in Kolkata
- Debiprasad Chattopadhyaya, philosophy, University of Calcutta
- Sibnarayan Ray, born in kolkata

== Science ==
- Sanghamitra Bandyopadhyay, computer scientist
- Amar Nath Bhaduri, Indian molecular enzymologist and chemical biologist
- Somnath Bharadwaj, cosmology
- Avik Bhattacharya, remote sensing
- Santanu Bhattacharya, chemistry
- Bhabatarak Bhattacharyya, Indian structural biologist, biochemist
- Mani Lal Bhaumik
- Birendra Bijoy Biswas, Indian molecular biologist and geneticist
- Satyendra Nath Bose, Indian theoretical physicist and mathematician
- Upendranath Brahmachari
- Bidyut Baran Chaudhuri, computer scientist
- Asis Datta, Indian biochemist, molecular biologist and genetic engineer
- Moumita Dutta, Indian physicist
- Anil Kumar Gain, mathematics
- Partha Ghose
- Sankar Ghosh, Indian-American immunologist, microbiologist, and biochemist
- Prasanta Chandra Mahalanobis
- Chanchal Kumar Majumdar, Indian condensed matter physicist
- Dwijesh Dutta Majumdar, computer scientist
- Ujjwal Maulik, computer scientist
- Ashesh Prosad Mitra
- Sisir Kumar Mitra, Indian physicist
- Mahan Mj, Mathematician
- Subhash Mukhopadhyay, physician
- Indira Nath, Indian immunologist
- Bedabrata Pain, NASA Scientist
- Sankar Kumar Pal, computer scientist
- Shehla Pervin, molecular biologist
- Prafulla Chandra Ray, Indian chemist, industrialist and philanthropist
- Amal Kumar Raychaudhuri
- Somak Raychaudhury, Indian astrophysicist
- Anjali Roy, mycologist
- Subrata Roy, plasma physics
- Ram Brahma Sanyal, zoology
- Debi Prasad Sarkar, Indian biochemist, immunologist and virologist
- Amartya Sen, Nobel Laureate, economist, Bank of Sweden Prize in Economic Sciences
- Ashoke Sen, physics
- Radhanath Sikdar
- Snehasikta Swarnakar, Indian chemical biologist

== Religious scholars ==
=== Muslim ===
- Jalaluddin Tabrizi (13th-century)
- Gazi Pir (13th-century)
- Pir Gorachand (13th-century)
- Usman Serajuddin (1258–1357)
- Alaul Haq (1301–1384)
- Nur Qutb Alam (d. 1416)
- Shah Mehr Ali (1808–1868)
- Ubaidullah Al Ubaidi Suhrawardy (1832–1885)
- Azangachhi Shaheb (1828–1932)
- Mohammad Abu Bakr Siddique (1865–1943)
- Abdullah al-Baqi (1886–1952)
- Abbas Siddiqui (born 1987)

=== Pre-modern period ===
- Krishnananda Agamavagisha
- Chaitanya Mahaprabhu
- Nityananda
- Ramprasad Sen
- Six Goswamis of Vrindavan

=== The Brahmo Samaj ===
- Anandamohan Bose
- Raja Ram Mohan Roy
- Keshub Chandra Sen
- Debendranath Tagore
- Ram Chandra Vidyabagish

=== Hindu revival movement ===
- Sri Aurobindo
- Sarada Devi
- Ramakrishna
- Swami Vivekananda

=== Mid-twentieth-century religious figures ===
- Swami Sri Yukteswar Giri
- Lahiri Mahasaya
- A. C. Bhaktivedanta Swami Prabhupada
- Paramahansa Yogananda

== Social reformation and social work ==
=== Major figures ===
- Anil Kumar Gain
- Dwarkanath Ganguly
- Nibaran Chandra Mukherjee
- Satish Chandra Mukherjee
- Protap Chunder Mozoomdar
- Raja Ram Mohan Roy
- Keshub Chandra Sen
- Harichand Thakur
- Ishwar Chandra Vidyasagar
- Swami Vivekananda

=== Derozians ===
- Krishna Mohan Banerjee
- Rajnarayan Basu
- Michael Madhusudan Dutt
- Hara Chandra Ghosh
- Ramgopal Ghosh
- Ramtanu Lahiri
- Rasik Krishna Mallick
- Kishori Chand Mitra
- Peary Chand Mitra
- Radhanath Sikdar

=== Women's rights ===
- Chandramukhi Basu
- Sarala Devi
- Kadambini Ganguly
- Kaberi Gayen
- Joyita Mondal, social worker
- Charulata Mukherjee
- Rani Rashmoni
- Begum Rokeya
- Romola Sinha

== Military ==
- Air Vice Marshal Madhavendra Banerji, recipient of Maha Vir Chakra
- Flight Lieutenant Suhas Biswas, recipient of Ashoka Chakra
- Subhas Chandra Bose, founder, Indian National Army
- General Jayanto Nath Chaudhuri, Indian Army Chief during the Indo-Pakistani War of 1965
- Admiral Adhar Kumar Chatterji, Indian Navy Chief between 1966 and 1970
- Air Commodore Sudhindra Kumar Majumdar (1927–2011), India's first military helicopter pilot
- Air Marshal Subroto Mukerjee, former Head of Indian Air Force
- Chief of the Air Staff Arup Raha, 24th chief of Indian Air Force
- Captain Man Bahadur Rai, recipient of Ashoka Chakra
- Indra Lal Roy, first Indian (pre Independence) flying ace
- General Shankar Roychowdhury, former Indian Army Chief
- William Tolly (1715–1784), an officer of the British East India Company

== Art ==
=== Early modern period ===
- Ramkinkar Baij
- Nandalal Bose
- Mukul Dey
- Kalipada Ghoshal
- Sailoz Mookherjea
- Benode Behari Mukherjee
- Jamini Roy
- Abanindranath Tagore
- Gaganendranath Tagore

=== From mid-twentieth century ===
- Bikash Bhattacharjee
- Jogen Chowdhury
- Somnath Hore
- Chintamoni Kar
- Anil Karanjai
- Paresh Maity
- Hemen Majumdar
- Rabin Mondal
- Samir Mondal
- Ganesh Pyne
- Paritosh Sen

=== Film and photography ===
- Dulal Dutta
- Goutam Ghose, filmmaker, cinematographer, and music composer
- Rituparno Ghosh, filmmaker
- Suman Ghosh, filmmaker, documentary filmmaker
- Ajoy Kar, cinematographer, filmmaker, screenwriter
- Tarun Majumdar, filmmaker, screenwriter, author, illustrator
- Subrata Mitra, cinematographer
- Hrishikesh Mukherjee, Indian film director, editor and writer
- Indrani Pal-Chaudhuri
- Satyajit Ray, filmmaker, screenwriter, author, illustrator and music composer
- Mrinal Sen, filmmaker, screenwriter, author

== Music ==
=== Composers ===
- Abbasuddin Ahmed
- Anil Biswas
- Raichand Boral
- S. D. Burman
- Salil Chowdhury
- Kamal Dasgupta
- Sudhin Dasgupta
- Nachiketa Ghosh
- Kazi Nazrul Islam
- Hemant Kumar
- Gauriprasanna Mazumder
- Manabendra Mukhopadhyay
- Dwijendralal Ray
- Dilipkumar Roy
- Atul Prasad Sen
- Rajanikanta Sen
- Kabir Suman
- Joy Sarkar
- Indraadip Dasgupta
- Arindom Chatterjee

=== Performers (instrumental) ===
- Nikhil Banerjee, sitar
- Sankha Chatterjee, tabla
- Buddhadeb Dasgupta, sarod
- Annapurna Devi, surbahar
- Jnan Prakash Ghosh, Harmonium and tabla
- Pannalal Ghosh, flute
- Shankar Ghosh, tabla
- Ali Akbar Khan, sarod
- Allauddin Khan, sarod and multi-instrumentalist
- Radhika Mohan Maitra, Sarod and Mohanveena
- Manilal Nag, sitar
- Ravi Shankar, sitar

=== Performers (vocal) ===
==== Classical ====
- Pandit Iman Das
- Gopeshwar Banerjee
- Naina Devi
- Ajoy Chakrabarty, vocal
- Tarapada Chakraborty
- Kaushiki Chakraborty

==== Songs of Tagore and his contemporaries ====
- Kanika Banerjee
- Debabrata Biswas
- Sarmila Bose
- Uma Bose
- Renuka Dasgupta
- Sahana Devi
- Gita Ghatak
- Santidev Ghosh
- Malati Ghoshal
- Suchitra Mitra
- Dilipkumar Roy
- Subinoy Roy
- Indrani Sen
- Nilima Sen
- Amiya Tagore
- Dinendranath Tagore

==== Modern ====
- Srikanta Acharya
- Mohammed Aziz
- Abhijeet Bhattacharya
- Dhananjay Bhattacharya
- R. D. Burman
- S. D. Burman
- Nachiketa Chakraborty
- Antara Chowdhury
- Kanan Devi
- K. C. Dey
- Manna Dey
- Anjan Dutt
- Geeta Dutt
- Jeet Gannguli
- Shreya Ghoshal
- Rupam Islam
- Amit Kumar
- Hemant Kumar
- Kishore Kumar
- Bappi Lahiri
- Madhushree
- Silajit Majumder
- Shyamal Mitra
- Shantanu Moitra
- Sandhya Mukherjee
- Manabendra Mukhopadhyay
- Pankaj Mullick
- Pritam
- Anupam Roy
- Kumar Sanu
- Indrani Sen
- Shaan
- Arijit Singh
- Kabir Suman
- Babul Supriyo
- Monali Thakur
- Ruma Guha Thakurta

==== Nazrul geeti ====
- Abbasuddin Ahmed
- Purabi Dutta
- Sohrab Hossain
- Manabendra Mukhopadhyay
- Indrani Sen

==== Shyama Sangeet ====
- Dhananjay Bhattacharya
- Pannalal Bhattacharya

==== Bengali Folk Song ====
- Abbasuddin Ahmed
- Basudeb Das Baul
- Kalika Prasad Bhattacharya
- Timir Biswas
- Fulati Gidali
- Ratan Kahar

== Movies ==
=== Directors ===
- Premankur Atorthy
- Anurag Basu
- Basu Bhattacharya
- Debaki Bose
- Pritish Chakraborty
- Raj Chakraborty
- Basu Chatterjee
- Aniruddha Roy Chowdhury
- Buddhadeb Dasgupta
- Chidananda Dasgupta
- Anjan Dutt
- Goutam Ghose
- Rituparno Ghosh
- Sujoy Ghosh
- Sushmit Ghosh
- Ritwik Ghatak
- Farha Khatun
- Tarun Majumdar
- Prem Prakash Modi
- Mohammad Mohsin
- Sujit Mondal
- Ayan Mukerji
- Hrishikesh Mukherjee
- Shiboprosad Mukherjee
- Suman Mukherjee
- Srijit Mukherji
- Bedabrata Pain
- Mujibar Rahaman
- Satyajit Ray
- Bimal Roy
- Aparna Sen
- Mrinal Sen
- Shaunak Sen
- Supriyo Sen
- Tapan Sinha
- Shoojit Sircar

=== Actors ===
- Apurva Agnihotri
- Ferdous Ahmed
- Mir Afsar Ali
- Bhanu Banerjee
- Kali Banerjee
- Victor Banerjee
- Anirban Bhattacharya
- Chhabi Biswas
- Biswajit Chakraborty
- Chiranjeet Chakraborty
- Mithun Chakraborty
- Pritish Chakraborty
- Sayak Chakraborty
- Tulsi Chakraborty
- Abhishek Chatterjee
- Abir Chatterjee
- Anil Chatterjee
- Dhritiman Chatterjee
- Hiran Chatterjee
- Parambrata Chatterjee
- Priyanshu Chatterjee
- Prosenjit Chatterjee
- Saswata Chatterjee
- Soumitra Chatterjee
- Subhendu Chatterjee
- Harindranath Chattopadhyay
- Utpal Datta
- Dev
- Lokesh Ghosh
- Rabi Ghosh
- Ankush Hazra
- Jeet
- Jayant Kripalani
- Pradeep Kumar
- Uttam Kumar
- Ranjit Mallick
- Kamal Mitra
- Joy Kumar Mukherjee
- Keshto Mukherjee
- Tathagata Mukherjee
- Tapas Paul
- Chinmoy Roy
- Rahul Roy
- Pahari Sanyal
- Asit Sen
- Jisshu Sengupta

=== Actresses ===
- Jaya Ahsan
- Varsha Ashwathi
- Pratyusha Banerjee
- Rachna Banerjee
- Mimi Chakraborty
- Moushumi Chatterjee
- Sabitri Chatterjee
- Srabanti Chatterjee
- Arundhati Devi
- Chhaya Devi
- Kanan Devi
- Kanan Devi
- Supriya Devi
- Subhashree Ganguly
- Anita Guha
- Rakhee Gulzar
- Indrani Haldar
- Nusrat Jahan
- June Malia
- Koel Mallick
- Madhabi Mukherjee
- Prema Narayan
- Devika Rani
- Debashree Roy
- Sumita Sanyal
- Aparna Sen
- Moon Moon Sen
- Raima Sen
- Reema Sen
- Rimi Sen
- Riya Sen
- Suchitra Sen
- Sushmita Sen
- Rituparna Sengupta
- Mamata Shankar
- Mala Sinha
- Sharmila Tagore
- Ruma Guha Thakurta

=== Cinematographer ===
- Supratim Bhol
- Kamal Bose
- Sudeep Chatterjee
- Nemai Ghosh
- Baby Islam
- Subrata Mitra
- Avik Mukhopadhyay
- Binod Pradhan
- Ramananda Sengupta

=== Editor ===
- Mainak Bhaumik
- Dulal Dutta
- Dipak Giri
- Rabiranjan Maitra
- Arghyakamal Mitra
- Srijit Mukherji

=== Screenplay writers ===
- Anjan Dutt
- Nabendu Ghosh
- Rudranil Ghosh
- Shaktipada Rajguru
- N. K. Salil

== Dance ==
- Sharmila Biswas
- Chitresh Das
- Gambhir Singh Mura
- Amala Shankar
- Mamata Shankar
- Uday Shankar
- Dona Ganguly

== Doctors ==
- Rafiuddin Ahmed
- Upendranath Brahmachari
- Sambhu Nath De
- Kadambini Ganguly
- Madhusudan Gupta
- Radha Gobinda Kar
- Shyama Prasad Mandal
- Subhash Mukhopadhyay
- Bidhan Chandra Roy
- Nilratan Sircar
- Tabitha Solomon

== Drama/theatre ==
- Ajitesh Bandopadhyay
- Sisir Bhaduri
- Bijon Bhattacharya
- Bibhash Chakraborty
- Khaled Choudhury
- Parthapratim Deb
- Utpal Dutt
- Usha Ganguly
- Girish Chandra Ghosh
- Debshankar Haldar
- Dinabandhu Mitra
- Sombhu Mitra
- Manoj Mitra
- Dwijendralal Ray
- Rudraprasad Sengupta
- Badal Sircar
- Jyotirindranath Tagore

== Magicians ==
- Ganapati Chakraborty
- Amin Suhrawardy
- Maneka Sorcar
- P. C. Sorcar
- P. C. Sorcar Jr.
- P. C. Sorcar, Young

== Politicians and revolutionaries ==
=== Pre-modern ===
- Devapala
- Dharmapala
- Gopala I
- Mahipala
- Ballāla Sena
- Lakshmana Sena
- Shashanka

=== Colonial period ===
- Alimuddin Ahmad
- Romesh Chunder Dutt
- Nripendra Narayan, philanthropist and ruler of Cooch Behar
- Kalim Sharafi
- Satyendra Prasanna Sinha, 1st Baron Sinha
- Satyendranath Tagore
- Titumir

=== Indian freedom fighters ===
==== Early figures ====
- Surendranath Banerjee
- Womesh Chunder Bonnerjee
- Rani Shiromani, queen of Karnagarh and leader of Chuar Rebellion
- Durjan Singh, leader of Chuar Rebellion

==== Twentieth century ====
- Maulana Azad
- Alimuddin Ahmad
- Sri Aurobindo
- Syed Badrudduja
- Lokenath Bal
- Surendranath Banerjee
- Benoy Basu
- Kanailal Bhattacharjee
- Kanailal Bhattacharyya
- Basanta Kumar Biswas
- Khudiram Bose
- Rash Behari Bose
- Sarat Chandra Bose
- Subhas Chandra Bose
- Prafulla Chaki
- Ambika Chakrabarty
- Panchanan Chakraborty
- Jogesh Chandra Chatterjee
- Suniti Choudhury
- Bina Das
- Chittaranjan Das
- Jatindra Nath Das
- Kalpana Datta
- Basanti Devi
- Bipin Behari Ganguli
- Ganesh Ghosh
- Barindra Kumar Ghosh
- Jiban Ghoshal
- Santi Ghose
- Badal Gupta
- Dinesh Gupta
- Matangini Hazra
- Bagha Jatin
- Hemchandra Kanungo
- Hare Krishna Konar
- Saroj Mukherjee
- Bipin Chandra Pal
- Sudhamoy Pramanick
- Renuka Ray
- Bidhan Chandra Roy
- Satish Chandra Samanta
- Birendranath Sasmal
- Narendra Mohan Sen
- Surya Sen
- Triguna Sen
- Ananta Singh
- Pritilata Waddedar

=== Politicians ===
- Muzaffar Ahmad
- Sultan Ahmed (Indian politician)
- Mamata Banerjee
- Jyoti Basu
- Buddhadeb Bhattacharjee
- Kedarnath Bhattacharya
- Tanmoy Bhattacharya
- Kanailal Bhattacharyya
- Partha Chatterjee
- Somnath Chatterjee
- Sovandeb Chattopadhyay
- A. B. A. Ghani Khan Choudhury
- Pratap Chandra Chunder
- Dev
- Atulya Ghosh
- Kamal Guha
- Bimal Gurung
- Hashim Abdul Halim
- Firhad Hakim
- Bir Singh Mahato
- Mriganko Mahato
- Narahari Mahato
- Abha Maiti
- Amit Mitra
- Ashok Mitra
- Pranab Mukherjee
- Subrata Mukherjee
- Derek O'Brien
- Ajit Kumar Panja
- Siddhartha Shankar Ray
- Bidhan Chandra Roy
- Mukul Roy
- Saugata Roy
- Tathagata Roy
- Mohammed Salim
- Prafulla Chandra Sen
- Babul Supriyo
- Sabina Yeasmin

=== Others ===
- Abul Barkat

== Philanthropy and social welfare ==
- Balaram Bose householder disciple of Ramakrishna
- Nabakrishna Deb
- Radhakanta Deb, published two Sanskrit dictionaries used by Westerners
- Anil Kumar Gain
- Bijay Chand Mahtab
- Uday Chand Mahtab
- Gobindram Mitter
- Muhammad Mohsin
- Manindra Chandra Nandy, Maharaja of Cossimbazar
- Rani Rashmoni
- Mutty Lall Seal
- Mother Teresa

== Sports ==
=== Chess ===
- Dibyendu Barua, Grandmaster
- Surya Shekhar Ganguly, Grandmaster
- Nisha Mohota, first woman Grandmaster of West Bengal

=== Cricket ===
- Montu Banerjee
- Shute Banerjee
- Subroto Banerjee
- Gopal Bose
- Utpal Chatterjee
- Nirode Chowdhury
- Benu Dasgupta
- Deep Dasgupta
- Rumeli Dhar
- Ashok Dinda
- Sourav Ganguly
- Jhulan Goswami
- Shreevats Goswami
- Subrata Guha
- Saba Karim
- Arun Lal
- Saradindu Mukherjee
- Ambar Roy
- Pankaj Roy
- Priyanka Roy
- Wriddhiman Saha
- Probir Sen
- Manoj Tiwary

=== Football ===
- Rahim Ali
- P. K. Banerjee
- Samar Banerjee
- Shibdas Bhaduri
- Subrata Bhattacharya
- Krishanu Dey
- Chuni Goswami
- Mehtab Hossain
- Sailen Manna
- Abhijit Mondal
- Arnab Mondal
- Syed Rahim Nabi
- Gostha Pal
- Subrata Paul
- Mohammed Rafique
- Gautam Sarkar

=== Lawn tennis ===
- Jaidip Mukerjea
- Leander Paes, noted lawn tennis player of India

=== Squash ===
- Ritwik Bhattacharya, currently second highest ranked Indian player
- Saurav Ghosal, currently highest ranked Indian player

=== Bodybuilding ===
- Manohar Aich, Mr. Universe, 1952
- Bishnu Charan Ghosh, noted bodybuilder and hathayogi
- Monotosh Roy, Mr. Universe, 1951

=== Swimming ===
- Masudur Rahman Baidya, world's first physically handicapped swimmer to swim across the Strait of Gibraltar
- Bula Choudhury, first Indian woman to swim the English Channel twice
- Prasanta Karmakar, para swimmer, 2010 Commonwealth Games, bronze medal
- Arati Saha, first Asian woman to swim English Channel in 1959
- Mihir Sen, first Indian to swim across the English Channel in 1958

=== Table tennis ===
- Ankita Das, table tennis player, 2012 Summer Olympics; participant in women's singles event, 2014 Commonwealth Games; participant in women's doubles even
- Mouma Das, table tennis player
- Poulomi Ghatak, table tennis player
- Soumyajit Ghosh, table tennis player; as of January 2013, his rank is 1st in India and 68th in Asia; 2014 Commonwealth Games, Participant in men's doubles event
- Subhajit Saha, Commonwealth games gold medallist

=== Weightlifting ===
- Sukhen Dey, Indian weightlifter; 2014 Commonwealth Games, gold medal; 2010 Commonwealth Games, gold medal
- Anil Mondal, Indian weightlifter, competed at the 1972 Summer Olympics and the 1976 Summer Olympics, the Arjuna Award in the year (1972)
- Achinta Sheuli, 2022 Commonwealth Games, Gold medal

=== Others ===
- Arjun Atwal, golfer
- Chhanda Gayen, mountaineering, first Bengali woman to climb Mount Everest
- Dipa Karmakar, Indian artistic gymnast; 2014 Commonwealth Games, bronze medal; 2010 Commonwealth Games participant
- Joydeep Karmakar, Indian shooter, 2012 Summer Olympics; qualified to represent India in men's 50m rifle prone event; 2014 Commonwealth Games participant
- Anirban Lahiri, Indian golfer
- Mohammed Ali Qamar, Indian boxer, 2002 Commonwealth Games, gold medal
- Jyotirmoyee Sikdar, athletics, double gold medallist at Bangkok Asiad, 1996

== Industry/business ==
- Radhe Shyam Agarwal
- Benu Gopal Bangur
- G. D. Birla
- Jugal Kishore Birla
- Madhav Prasad Birla
- Pritish Chakraborty
- Purnendu Chatterjee
- Alamohan Das
- Sadhan Dutt
- Sumantra Ghoshal
- R. P. Goenka
- Radhe Shyam Goenka
- Ramnath Goenka
- Sanjiv Goenka
- Rajat Gupta
- Lakshmi Mittal
- Rajendra Nath Mookerjee
- Diptendu Pramanick
- Subir Raha
- Jagat Seth
- Dilip Shanghvi
- Dwarkanath Tagore

== See also ==
- List of people by India state
- List of Bengalis
