= List of Baul artists =

Baul
- Medium: Music and poetry
- Originating culture: Bengal

Baul songs
- UNESCO Intangible Cultural Heritage
- Country: Bangladesh
- Reference: 00107
- Region: Asia and the Pacific

Inscription history
- Inscription: 2008 (3rd session)
- List: Representative

Baul or Bauls (Bengali: বাউল) are a group of mystic minstrels from Bengal, which includes the country of Bangladesh and the Indian State of West Bengal. Lalon is regarded as the most important poet-practitioner of the Baul tradition. Baul music had a great influence on Rabindranath Tagore's poetry and on his music (Rabindra Sangeet).

== List ==
Famous Baul singers both from Bangladesh and West Bengal include:

Pinaki Chatterjee Baul

- Abdur Rahman Boyati
- Bapi Das Baul
- Basudeb Das Baul
- Bidit Lal Das
- Debu Bhattacharya
- Kangalini Sufia
- Paban Das Baul
- Parvathy Baul
- Saidur Rahman Boyati
- Shah Abdul Karim
- Shyam Sundar Baishnab
- Shushama Das
