= Prahlad Tipanya =

Indian folk singer

Prahlad Singh Tipaniya
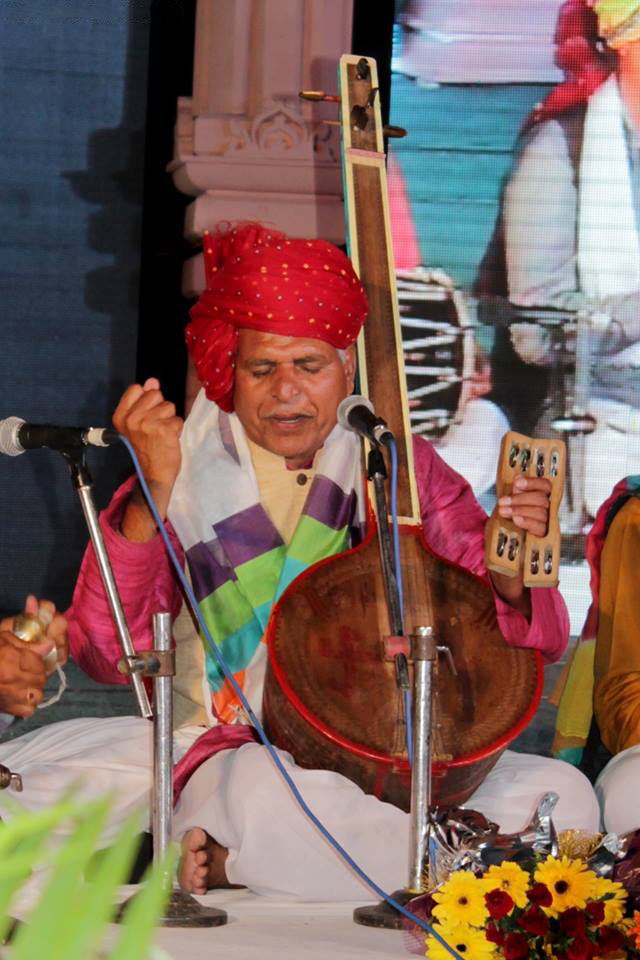

Background information
- Also known as: Prahladji, Tipaniya Ji
- Genre: folk
- Occupations: Singer, politician, social worker
- Years active: 1978 – present
- Website: http://www.kabirproject.org

Prahlad Singh Tipaniya is an Indian folk singer who performs Kabir bhajans in the Malwi folk style from Madhya Pradesh. He performs along with a group of tambura, khartal, manjira, dholak, harmonium, timki, and violin players.

== Early life ==
Prahlad Tipaniya was born in a Malwi Balai caste family on 7 September 1954 in Luniakhedi, Tarana, Malwa, Madhya Pradesh.

== Career ==
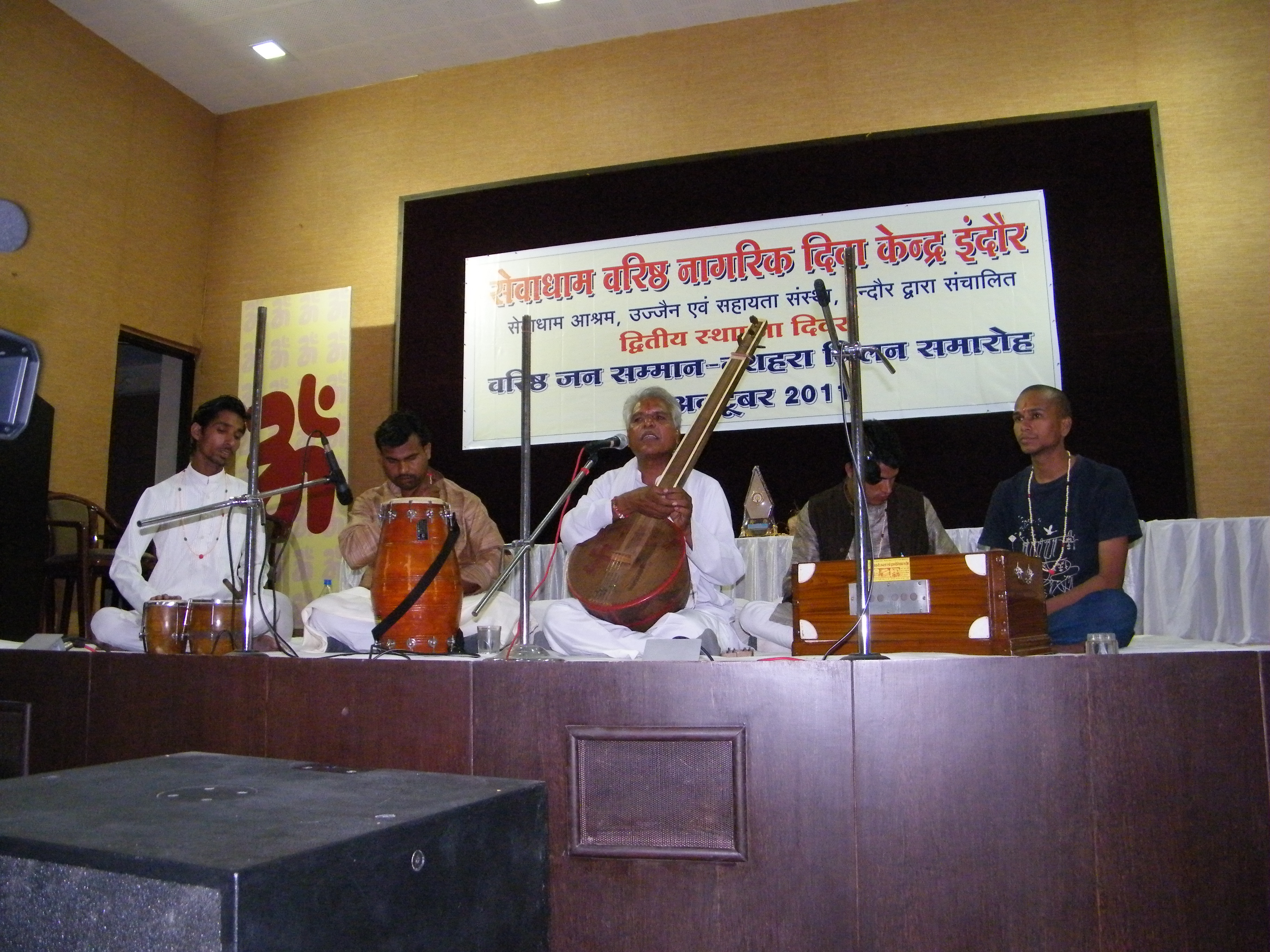
Prahlad S Tipanya performing in a function in Indore

Prahlad Singh Tipaniya has visited UK, the United States & Pakistan as well as in India in different 'Yatras' named as "Amerika Me Kabir Yatra" and "Had-Anhad" and his music has been played on All India Radio stations in Indore, Bhopal, Jabalpur, Patna, Lucknow and Kanpur and also featured on Doordarshan. Tipanya has received several awards including Shikhar Samman (2005) by Madhya Pradesh Government, Sangeet Natak Akademi Award in 2007 and the Padma Shri in 2011.

He also performed at the annual Sufi music festival, Ruhaniyat and also countless Kabir festivals. He also runs a program named "Sadguru Kabir Shodh Sansthan".

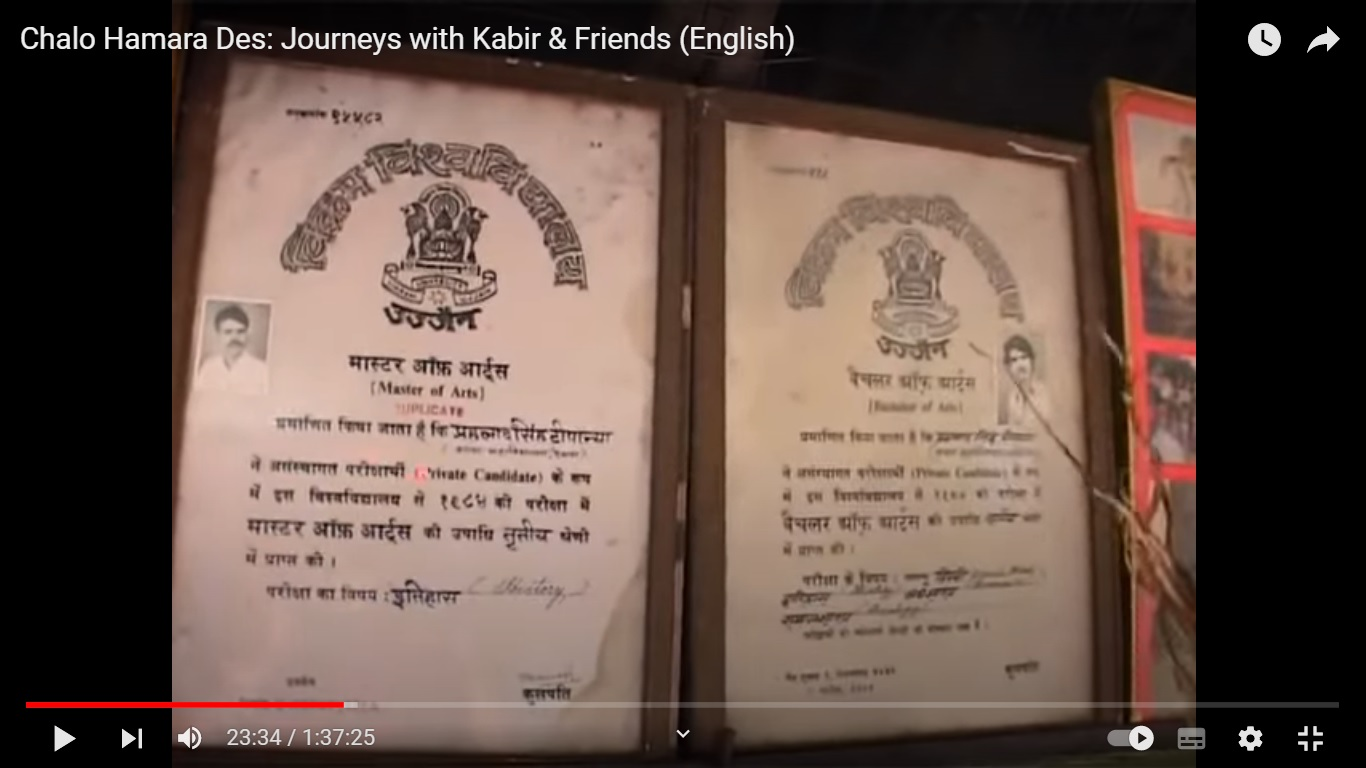
BA in Hindi (1980) & BA in History (1984). Courtesy: Chalo Hamare Desh (Kabir Project)

He is BSc graduate and teacher of mathematics and science in Government School. He has done BA in 1980 & MA (History) from Government Mahavidyalaya Dewas Vikram University Ujjain in 1984.

Tipanya has been also part of 3 documentary films made by Shabnam Virmani an Indian documentary film maker under a project called "Ajab Sahar- The Kabir Project".

He joined the Indian National Congress and contesting a member of parliament [Lok Shaba] election in 2019 from Dewas-Shajapur parliamentary constituency in Madhya Pradesh.
