= Brahmachari =

Brahmachari may refer to:

== People ==
- Brahmachari, a male who practices brahmacharya, a type of living as per Hindu Vedic Scriptures, feminine Brahmacharini
- Dhirendra Brahmachari (1924–1994), Indian yogi
- Keshavananda Brahmachari (1830–1942), Indian Kriya yogi
- Mahanambrata Brahmachari (1904–1999), Indian Hindu monk
- Mohanananda Brahmachari (1904–1999), Indian guru
- Prabhudutt Brahmachari (fl. mid 20th century), Indian religious leader
- Samir K. Brahmachari (born 1952), Indian biophysicist
- Shuddhaanandaa Brahmachari (born 1949), Indian author and motivational speaker
- Sita Brahmachari (born 1966), British author
- Upendranath Brahmachari (1873–1946), Indian physician and scientist
- Vishnubawa Brahmachari (1825–1871), Indian Marathi Hindu revivalist

== Film ==
- Brahmachari (1938 film), an Indian Marathi-language film starring Meenakshi Shirodkar and Master Vinayak
- Brahmachari (1968 Hindi film), an Indian film starring Shammi Kapoor, Rajshree and Pran
- Brahmachari (1968 Telugu film), an Indian film starring Akkineni Nageswara Rao and Jayalalitha
- Brahmachari (1972 film), an Indian Malayalam-language film
- Brahmachari (1992 film), an Indian Tamil-language film
- Brahmachari (2019 film), an Indian Kannada-language film

== See also ==
- Mr. Brahmachari, a 2003 Indian film
