= Basudeb Das Baul =

Basudeb Das বাসুদেব দাস
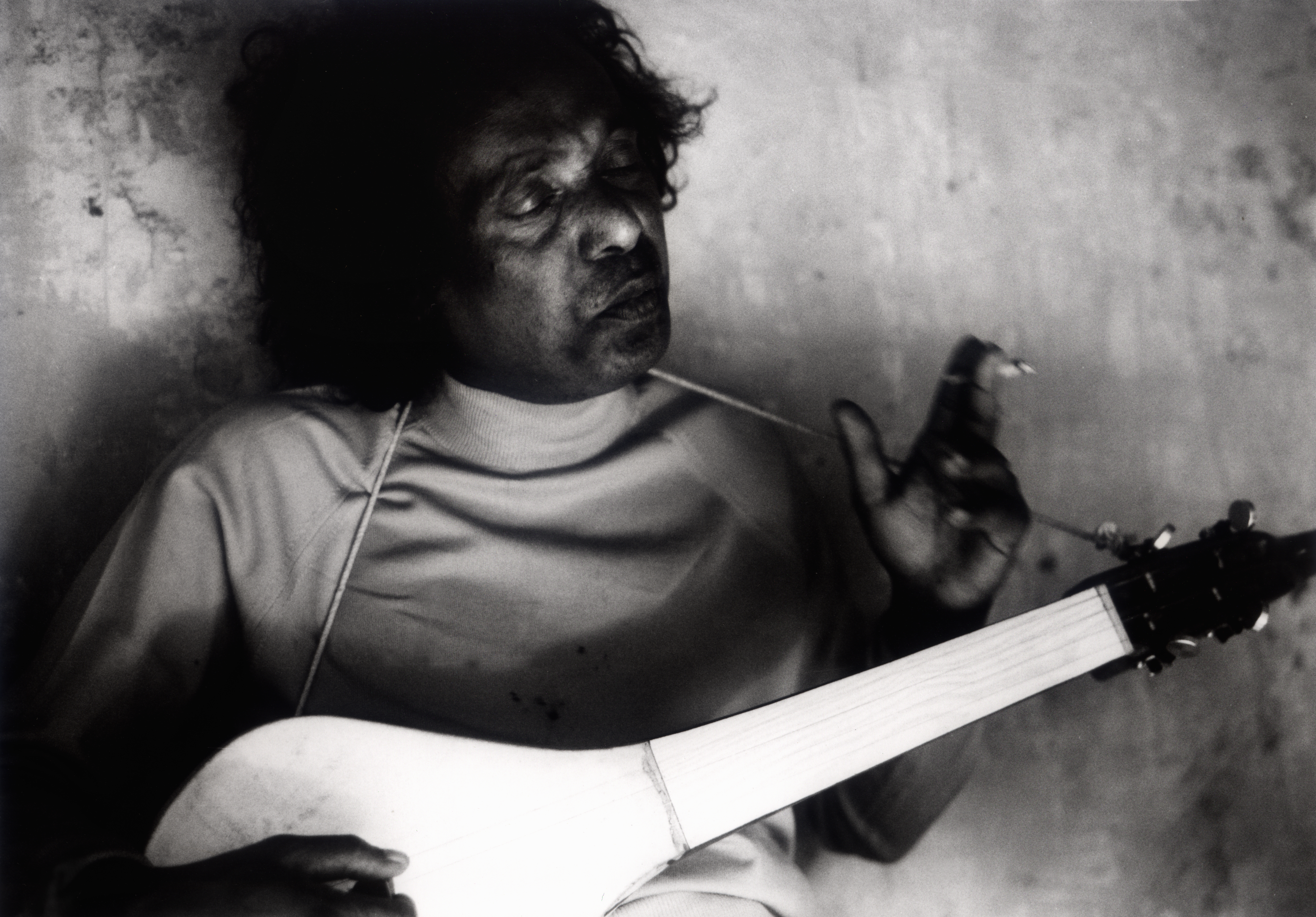
- Basudeb

Background information
- Born: Basudeb Das; Bolpur, Birbhum district, West Bengal, India
- Origin: West Bengal
- Genres: Baul; folk
- Occupations: singer; musician
- Instruments: khamak; ektara; dotara
- Years active: ?-present
- Labels: Folkpick

Basudeb Das Baul is a Bengali baul singer and musician from Bolpur in Birbhum district, West Bengal, India; who also plays khamak, ektara, and dotara as an accompaniment. He is known for pioneering traditional Baul music on the international music scene. He also works on the music score for the Australian film The Waiting City as a featured soloist in 2009. A critically acclaimed Bangladeshi movie "Hawa" also featured one of his celebrated song "Atta baje deri koris na" in his own voice.

Early life Basudeb was growing up in a village twenty-five kilometres away from Santiniketan, West Bengal, India. Though he spent most of the time of his life at Santiniketan. Where Basudeb became friends with a number of singers, including Shanti Deb Ghosh, Prabhat Mukharjee and Paban Das Baul. He started singing folk songs since his age of thirteen.

Basudeb took baul lessons from several mentors like Shwapan Chatterjee, Dinanath Das Baul, Naran Das, Baka Sham Das, and Bishwanath Das. He collaborated Kolkata Jazz Festival since 2004 with Tanmoy Bose. He also performed at Dhaka International Folk Fest Concert, 2017 in Dhaka, Bangladesh.

In 2009, Basudeb's debut solo studio album Aat Kuthuri Noy Doroja was released by Folkpick.

== Personal life ==
Basudeb is married and lives in Birbhum. He has a daughter named Anita and a son Bhola.

== Discography ==
List of studio albums
Title
Aat Kuthuri Noy Doroja
Album details
- Released: 25 September 2009
- Label: Folkpick
- Formats: CD

All music is composed by Basudeb Das Baul.

No.	Title	Lyrics	Length
1.	"Hridmajharey Rakbo"	Lalon	4:47
2.	"Aar Chaina Janaam"	Lalon	5:03
3.	"Aar Keno Mon"		7:23
4.	"Nadi Bhora Dheu"	Bhaba Pagla	4:16
5.	"Mora Nodir Chare"		5:57
6.	"Kobe Hobe Biye"		5:10
7.	"Panchobotir Patay Patay"	Traditional	4:38
8.	"Dil Doriyar Majhe"	Lalon	5:27
9.	"Ek Mayer Duti Sontaan"	Lalon	4:46
10.	"Emon Bhaber Noditey"		5:23
11.	"Eh Khelaghor Bhangbey"		4:53
12.	"Aat Kuthuri Noy Doroja"	Lalon	4:15

Ref(s).

=== Filmscores ===
- The Waiting City (2009) - featured soloist

=== Concerts ===
- Dhaka International Folk Fest - 2017

== See also ==
- List of Baul artists
