= Henry Daniels (statistician) =

British statistician

Henry Ellis Daniels FRS
- Born: 2 October 1912; London, UK
- Died: 16 April 2000 (aged 87); Shrewsbury, UK
- Occupation: Statistician
- Known for: The Parry-Daniels map Saddle point approximation
- Spouse: Barbara Pickering (m. 1950)
- Children: 2

Academic background
- Education: University of Edinburgh; University of Cambridge
- Doctoral advisor: Alexander Aitken

Academic work
- Institutions: Wool Industries Research Association; University of Cambridge; University of Birmingham
- Doctoral students: David Cox; James Durbin; Anil Kumar Gain; Wally Smith

Henry Ellis Daniels FRS (2 October 1912 – 16 April 2000) was a British statistician. He was President of the Royal Statistical Society (1974–1975), and was awarded its Guy Medal in Gold in 1984, following a silver medal in 1947. He became a Fellow of the Royal Society of London in 1980. The Parry-Daniels map is named after him (together with the English mathematician Bill Parry).

== Education and career ==
Daniels was born in London and was educated at George Heriot's School. He subsequently graduated from the University of Edinburgh (M.A. Hons. 1933, PhD 1943) and went on to further study at Clare College, Cambridge (B.A. 1935). In 1957, he became the first Professor of Mathematical Statistics at the University of Birmingham. He stayed at the university till his retirement in 1978. After retirement, he went to Cambridge and lived there until his death. He died at Royal Shrewsbury Hospital, having suffered a "massive stroke" at breakfast time the previous day. His funeral was officiated, at his request, by a humanist.

The watchmaker George Daniels (no relation) enlisted Daniels' help with the equations required for the design of his Space Traveller's Watch.

== Personal life ==
Daniels' family was Jewish, of Russian (partly Polish and partly Lithuanian) origin. In 1950, Daniels married Barbara Pickering; together, they had two children.

In 2000, while on travel during a workshop held at Gregynog Hall, Daniels suffered a massive stroke and died at the nearby Royal Shrewsbury Hospital.

== Selected publications by Daniels ==
- Daniels, H. E. (1954). "Saddlepoint Approximations in Statistics" (PDF). The Annals of Mathematical Statistics. 25 (4): 631–650. doi:10.1214/aoms/1177728652.
- Daniels, H. E. (1975). "Statistics in Universities--A Personal View". Journal of the Royal Statistical Society. 138 (1): 1–17. doi:10.2307/2345246. JSTOR 2345246.
