= Sourav Mukhopadhyay =

Bengali author (born 1973)

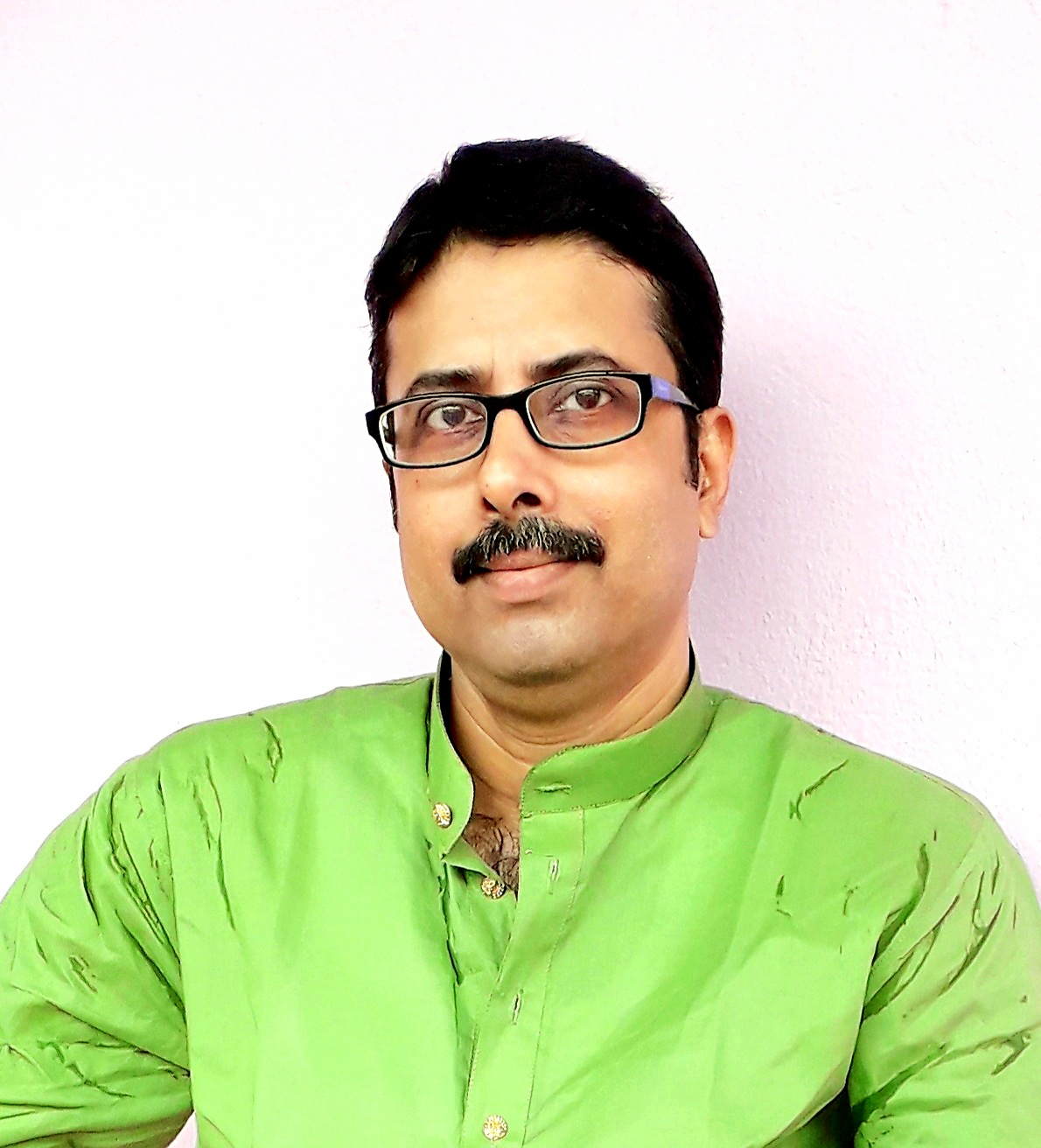
- Born: April 24, 1973 (age 53); India
- Education: Bachelor of Arts
- Alma mater: Narasinha Dutt College
- Writing career
- Language: Bengali
- Notable work: Prothom Prabaho,
- Notable awards: Sandipan Chattapadhyay Sammanana

Sourav Mukhopadhyay (born 24 April 1973) is a Bengali author from India. He has written several Bengali stories and novels for both adults and children. He is mostly admired for his novel Prothom Prabaho, based on Mahabharat Adi parba, published in Desh, an esteemed Bengali language literary magazine published by ABP Group.

== Early life ==
Sourav was born in Serampore in 1973. He spent his childhood in Uttar Jhapardaha, Domjur, in Howrah district and living there till now. He completed his schooling from Makardaha Bamasundari institution in 1991. He became graduate in English from Narasinha Dutt College in 1994. Mukhopadhyay started his career as an employee of state government and working as an English teacher in Higher Secondary School presently.

== Literary career ==
Sourav's tryst with publishing began in 2003 when he wrote three stories, which were published simultaneously in three leading magazines in 2004. Bipannya (Bengali: বিপন্ন) was published in Saptahik Bartaman (Bengali: সাপ্তাহিক বর্তমান), and after a few months Merudandi in Desh and Joutuk in Sananda.

Having a great acceptance from publishers as well as readers, Sourav started sending his short stories and articles to different magazines. In 2005, Sourav won second prize at a competition for comic stories organized by Desh. By 2009, 20 of his short stories had been published.

In 2009, Sourav started writing his 1st novel, Granthi, which was published in Sharadiya issue of Desh, 2010. According to the writer "This was a first-person account of four people of different age groups and at different stages of their lives, who recounted their relationships with women." His 2nd novel, Andhar Nadi was published in the Sharadiya issue of Patrika in 2011, followed by the publishing of his political novel, Sankranti, in Sharadiya issue of Anandabazar Patrika in 2012. Sankranti is based on the West Bengal Legislative Assembly election, 2011 which was famous for the change in government in West Bengal after 34 years( AITMC won, resulting in the end of the 34-year rule of the Left Front government). His 4th novel Saapludo, was published in Sharadiya issue of Unish Kuri, 2013

In January 2014, Sourav's 5th novel Dhulokhela started publishing in monthly issues of Desh magazine regularly. The story has two protagonists- Kingshuk and Tamal and based on them there are two main issues in the novel. Tamal is associated with personal experience and the fight of a budding writer trying to establish him. On the other hand, Kingshuk is associated with the land movement which is based on Singur land movement. In this novel, Sourav strongly criticizes the mentality and the process of forcefully land acquisition by Left Front government in Singur. After completion of the novel, it was highly appreciated by readers as well as critiques also. Ananda Publishers published it as a book in 2015.

In the Sharaidiya issue of Patrika of 2015, Sourav's experimental novel Jiban Athaba was published. It is a multilayered novel, enclosing the struggle, love, betrayal of modern Bengali society with the presence of the poetry and life of a poet. Sourav deconstructs Jibananda das's poetry and represents him as Jibanbabu, a character of the novel. Many of Jibananda's poems have been used in this novel.

In 2016 Desh Sharadiya, Sourav wrote his latest novel, Prothom Probaho. It is a deconstruction of the 1st Parva of Mahavarata. The novel becomes controversial for the explicit description of sexuality. Sourav accused of "representing vulgarity in name of literature" by critiques as well as some writers.

Besides these novels, Sourav wrote down more than a hundred short stories in different commercial magazines in the Bengali language like Desh, Sananda, Unish Kuri, Tathyakendra, Saptahik Bartaman, Ajkal and many others. Some of his short stories like Shrabandhara, Prothom Jedin, Neel Ronger Gate have been praised by readers.

Sourav has also written two detective novels. The 2nd novel, Godhulite Mrityur Chaya was published in Sukhi Grihokon, a monthly magazine. The novel is also included in the Shotoborsher Shreshtha Rohosyo Uponyas part 3 edited by Anish Deb, published from Patra Bharati.

== Literature for children ==
Sourav Mukhopadhyay has also penned a lot of short stories and novels for children also.

His 1st story for children, E thief.com was published in Anadamela a Bengali children's magazine in April 2006.

=== List of short stories for children ===
- E thief.com (Anandamela, April, 2006)
- Farewell (Anandamela, October, 2006)
- Debipakkher Kenakata (Anandamela, 02-May-2007)
- Ramkhelaoner Keramoti ( Anandamela, 02-July-2007) (included in Sera Kishore Kalpobigyan as Kheloyar Ramkhelaon, Edited by Anish Deb, Shishu Kishore Academy)
- Swapner Relgari (Anandamela Sharadiya 2007)
- Kuyashar Abinash (Anandamela, 02-Mar-2008)
- Gabar Byaparsyapar (Anandamela, 20-Oct-2008)
- Dupurer Swopno (Anandamela, 20-Nov-2008)
- Thik Onko (Anandamela, 20-Apr-2009) (included in Chamatkar Chorer Galpo, Edited by Ratntanu Ghati, Udayaraun Publishers, 2015)
- Charan Das Chaplin (Anandamela, 05-July-2009)
- Buggir Jonnyo (Kishore Bharati, July-2009)
- Khader Dhare Vanga Railing (Anandamela, 05-Oct-2009)
- Last Traine Rat Egarotay (Anandamela Sharadiya 2009)
- Prothom Swad (Kishore Bharati Sharadiya 2009)
- Bisforoner Pore (Kishore Bharati, Jan 2010)
- Dinta poya chilo (Kishore Bharati, May 2010)
- Riple Kathamala (Anandamela, 05-Aug-2010)
- Velkunmamar Velki (Anandamela, 05-Oct-2010)
- Khogeshchandrer Khogantanka (Kishore Bharati Sharadiya 2010)
- Goljoge Porlen Golokbabu (Sisumahal Sharadiya 2010, Published from Tripura)
- Moron Banchon (Kishore Bharati January 2011)
- Kalboishekhir Rate (Anandamela, 05-May-2011)
- Guptababur supto asha (Kishore Bharati, May 2011)
- Amriter Sandhane Velkunmama (Anandamela, 05-Oct-2011)
- Vanga Deoyal (Anandamela Sharadiya 2011)
- Prayshchitto (Kishore Bharati Sharadiya 2011)
- Poritosh Mittirer Chuti (Sishumahal Sharadiya 2011)
- Mrityuban ( Kishore Bharati, May 2012)
- Bagha Tentul (Anandamela, 05-Jan-2013)
- Samajhdar ( Kishore Bharati, Jan 2013)
- Chapakhanr Dena (Anandamela, 05-May-2013)
- Kabirajdadur Dairy (Kishore Bharati, May 2013)
- Mrityunjoyer Mrityusongbad (Chiro Sabuj Lekha, May–July 2013)
- Madhubabur Pujo (Hutopati Sharadiya 2013)
- Tongui (Anandamela, 05-Jan-2014)
- Nagen Malliker Dibyacakkhu (Chiro Sabuj Lekha, Sharadiya 2014)
- Rater Kora Nara (Part of children story collection Vutgulo Sob Notun notun, Edited by Ratntanu Ghati, Udayarun Publishers)
- Beltolay Ghotiram (Chiro Sabuj Lekha Sharadiya, 2015)
- Dhamu (Anandamela, 05-Oct-2015)
- Shalikher Ma (Chiro Sabuj Lekha, Sharadiya 2016)
- Rin (Mayakanon, 2016)
- Angti (Shishumahal)

=== List of novels for children ===
Sourav's 1st novel for children was Captain Tomosoner Guptadhan( The treasure of Captain Tomson). It was also published in Anandamela 20 February 2012 issue. It was a historical adventure fiction, based on the myth of Cocos Island and the Peru of the 19th century. After that, he wrote more novels for children until today.

- Captain Tomosoner Guptadhan (Anandamela 20 February 2012)
- Megh Chenra Rod (Sharodiya Anandamela, 2013)
- Velkunmama o Mithyanweshi (Sharodiya Anandamela, 2014)
- Rupkothar Jonmodin (Sharodiya Ghoraddim, 2017)
- Jipur Jaoya Asa( Sharodiya Anandamela, 2018)

== Bibliography ==
1. Gronthi; Published in January 2011 by Ananda Publishers; ISBN 8177569961 (ISBN 9788177569964)
2. Aandhar Nodi; Published in January 2012 by Ananda Publishers; ISBN 9789350400753
3. Sankranti; Published in January 2013 by Ananda Publishers
4. Saapludo; Published in January 2014 by Ananda Publishers; ISBN 9789350403280
5. Captain Tomosoner Guptadhan; Published November 2014 by মিত্র ও ঘোষ পাবলিশার্স প্রাইভেট লিমিটেড; ISBN 9789350201503
6. Megh Chenra Rod; Published in January 2014 by Ananda Publishers; ISBN 9789350403495
7. Dhulokhela; Published in 2014 by Ananda Publishers ISBN 978-9350404218
8. Velkunmama o Mithyanweshi;Published in January 2015 by Ananda Publishers; ISBN 9789350404393
9. Jiban Athaba; Published in January 2016 by Ananda Publishers; ISBN 9350405768 (ISBN 9789350405765)
10. Prothom Probaho; Published in January 2017 by Ananda Publishers; ISBN 9789350407455
11. Gol Golpo Chouko Golpo; Published in January 2017 by The Cafe Table
12. Rupkothar Jonmodin; Published in January 2017 by The Cafe Table
13. Kabirajdadur Diary; Published in February 2019 by The Cafe Table
14. Jipur Jaoya Asa; Published in February 2019 by Ananda Publishers
15. Chaitramas O Sarbonasher Galpo; Published in February 2020 by The Cafe Table ISBN 9789387753754
16. Sonali Megh Rupoli Chaya; Published in February 2020 by Ananda Publishers

== Controversies ==
Sourav Mukhopadhyay has claimed in the media that Padmanabha Dashgupta has copied the plot of the film Chaplin, released on 26 August 2011, from his story titled Charan Das Chaplin that was published in a Bengali children's magazine on July 5, 2009. The coincidences include how a character takes up the job of dressing up as a Chaplin performer to ward off poverty, the life-threatening illness of his son, and how the father celebrates the son's birthday.

Padmanabha Dasgupta totally denied the allegation saying that he finished the first draft of the script on December 21, 2007. Rudranil Ghosh (the lead actor of the film), Anindo Banerjee (director of the film) and many other people from Tollywood industry stood for Padmanabha Dasgupta.

None of the sides went to court for a legal step. However, as the release date of the story is before the release date of the film, it still remains a controversy.

== Awards ==
Sourav won second prize at a competition for comic stories organized by Desh. In 2010, he won first prize. in a similar competition, organized by Kishore Bharati.

Sourav was awarded Sandipan Chattapadhyay Sammanana (Krittibas Puroskar), for his novel Prothom Probaho.
