= Ektara =

Stringed musical instrument

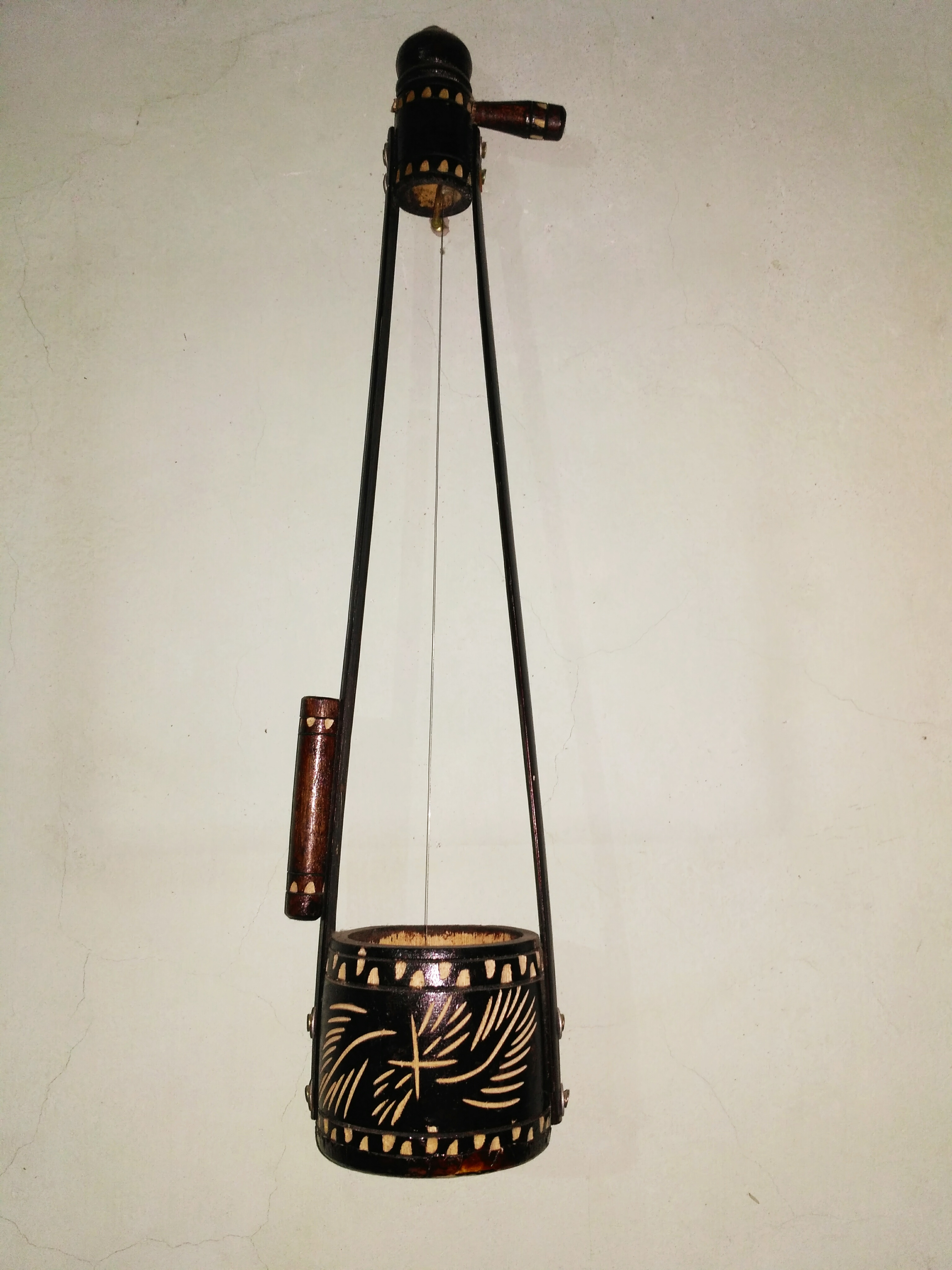
An Ektara from Bangladesh

The ektara (Bengali: একতারা, Nepali: एकतारे; literally 'one-string', also called, ektar, golki Nepali: गोल्) is a one-stringed musical instrument used in the traditional music of Bengal, and used in modern-day music of Bangladesh, and eastern India.

Two-stringed versions are called dotara (two strings), a name which also applies to another instrument of the same name.

In origin, the ektara was a regular string instrument of Bauls and is plucked with one finger. The ektara is a drone lute consisting of a gourd resonator covered with skin, through which a bamboo neck is inserted. It is used in parts of India and Nepal today by Yogis and wandering holy men to accompany their singing and prayers. In Nepal, the instrument accompanies the singing of the Ramayana and Mahabharata.

There are three other instruments used in South Asia which sometimes go by the same name as the ektara but are not related. One form resembles a lute. To make that version, a bamboo stick (90 cm long) is inserted through the side of a wooden bowl (called a "tumbo") and the top of the bowl is covered with deerskin. The instrument has a single string running from a peg at the top, down the length of the stick-neck, across a bridge on the deerhide soundboard, and is tied at the "spike" where the stick pokes through the bowl. The instrument's string is plucked with the musician's index fingernail.

A second instrument (the gopichanta) uses a drum-like body, a one-piece bamboo neck consisting of a pegbox and two laths formed out of a carved section of hollow bamboo (with a wooden peg on the side of the pegbox at the upper end), as well as a skin soundboard with a string attached in the centre. The two bamboo laths are attached to the side of the drum shell and the string goes from the soundboard to a peg at the end of the neck where the laths join the pegbox. This version of the instrument may be played either by plucking the string or by tapping the drumhead. Squeezing and releasing the bamboo laths changes the tension of the string and bends the pitch down and back up. This form is associated with the Bauls of West Bengal, as well as the Tharu people of Udayapur District, Nepal.

A third instrument sometimes called ektara, also called the tuṇtuṇe, consists of a drum with a stick attached along the outer wall. A string runs from a hole in the drumhead to the power in the end of the stick. It is played to accompany song, held under the left arm, "tuned to the tonic" and played for rhythm and as a drone. This is an instrument of a of Western India, used by "Hindu Sadhus and Islamic Sufi saints" and by Bhil, Kukna and Warli tribes.

== Performance ==
Grove Music Online describes the playing of an ektara as: "The ektārā player holds his instrument upright, gripping the neck just above the resonator and plucking the playing string or strings with the index finger of the same hand. If he is dancing, he supports the gourd resonator with his other hand, in which he carries clusters of small bells which sound as he beats his hand against the gourd." Pressing the two halves of the neck together loosens the string, thus lowering its pitch. The modulation of the tone with each slight flexing of the neck gives the ektara its distinctive sound. There are no markings or measurements to indicate what pressure will produce what note, so the pressure is adjusted by ear. The various sizes of ektara are soprano, tenor, and bass. The bass ektara, sometimes called a dotara often has two strings (as literally implied by do, 'two').

== Use ==
The ektara is a common instrument in Baul music from Bengal. Some controversy has arisen in recent years over the adoption and alleged corruption of Baul music by popular bands and films in Bengal. It has become common to mix traditional instruments like the ektara with more modern sounds in an attempt to appeal to a wide audience, which according to Purna Das Baul is "destroying the true beauty" of Baul music.

=== Kirtan and Sufi chanting ===
The ektara is commonly used in kirtan chanting, a Hindu devotional practice of singing the divine names and mantras in an ecstatic call and response format. The ektara is used by Sadhus (wandering holy men) for Sufi chanting, as well as by the Bauls.

The use of a stringed drone instrument to accompany the voice in religious settings can be documented in images as far back as the 4th-5th century, when a singer was painted in the Ajanta Caves. He was singing or chanting to Indra, and was accompanied by a one-stringed zither that is structurally the same as the alapini vina.

== Gallery ==
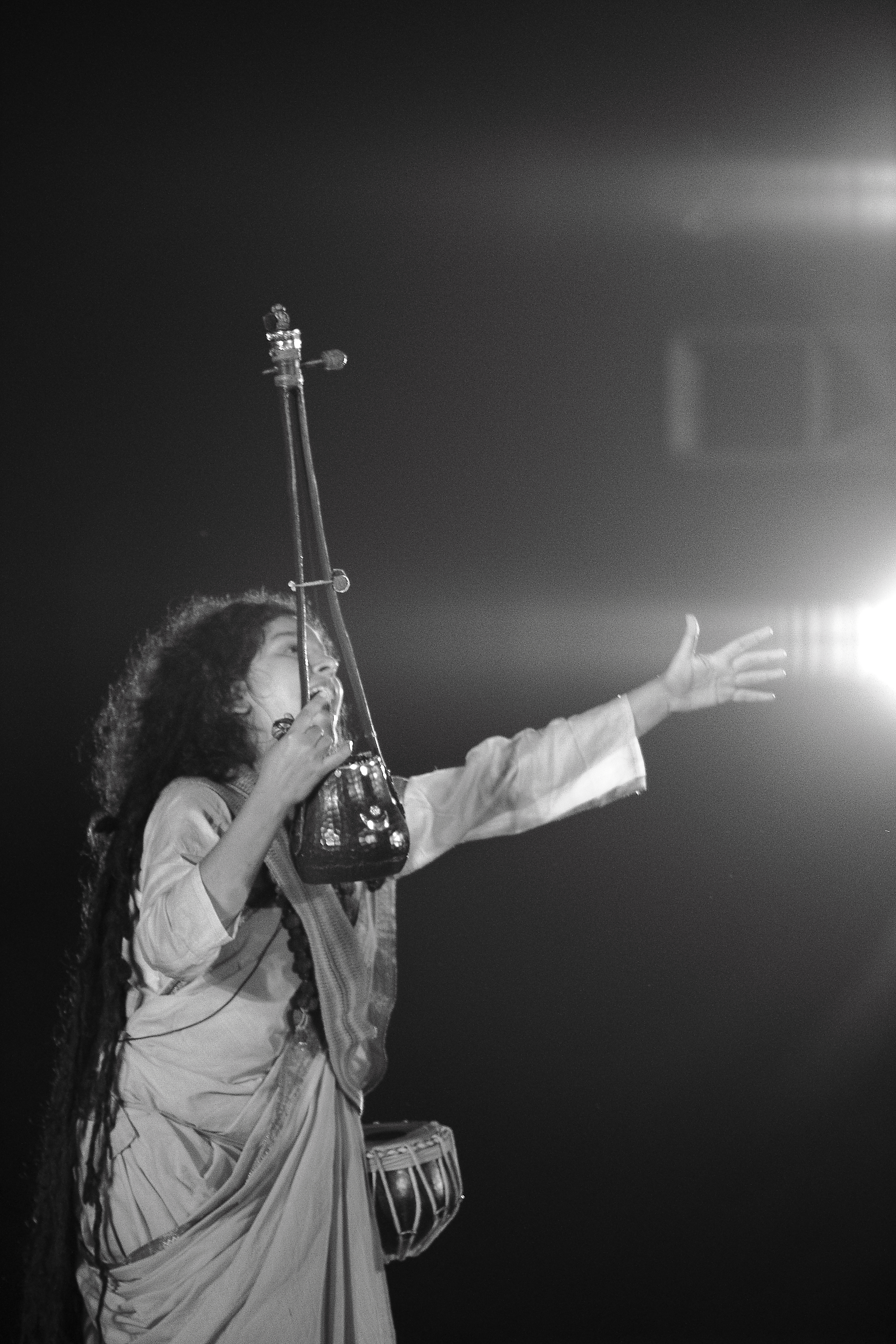
Parvathy Baul at Ruhaniyat mystic music festival, at Purana Qila, Delhi

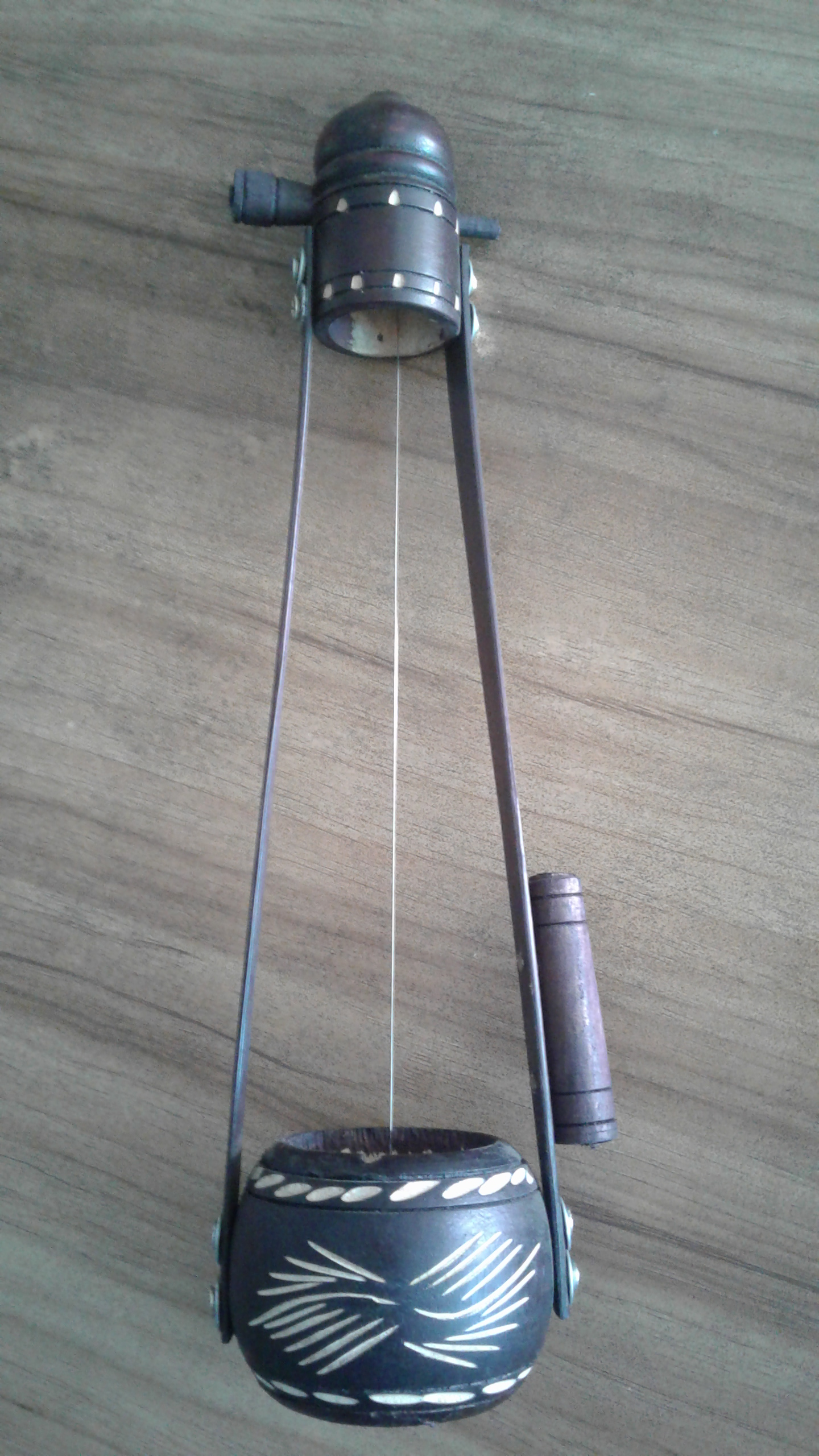
Ektara of Bangladesh

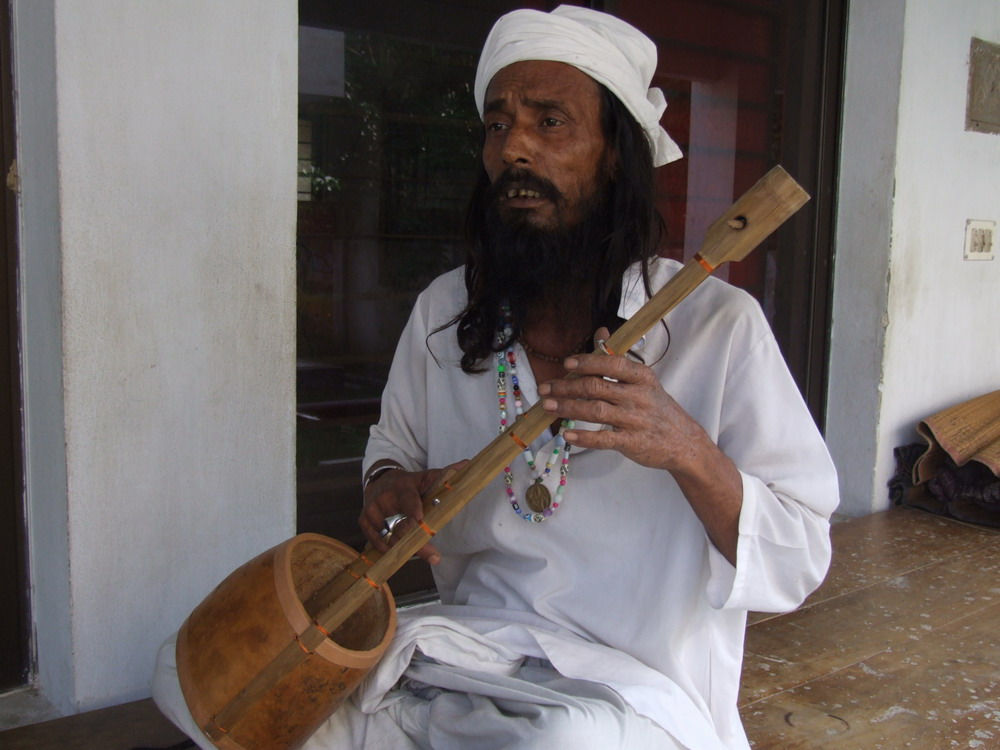
Musician from Bangladesh playing the Ektara

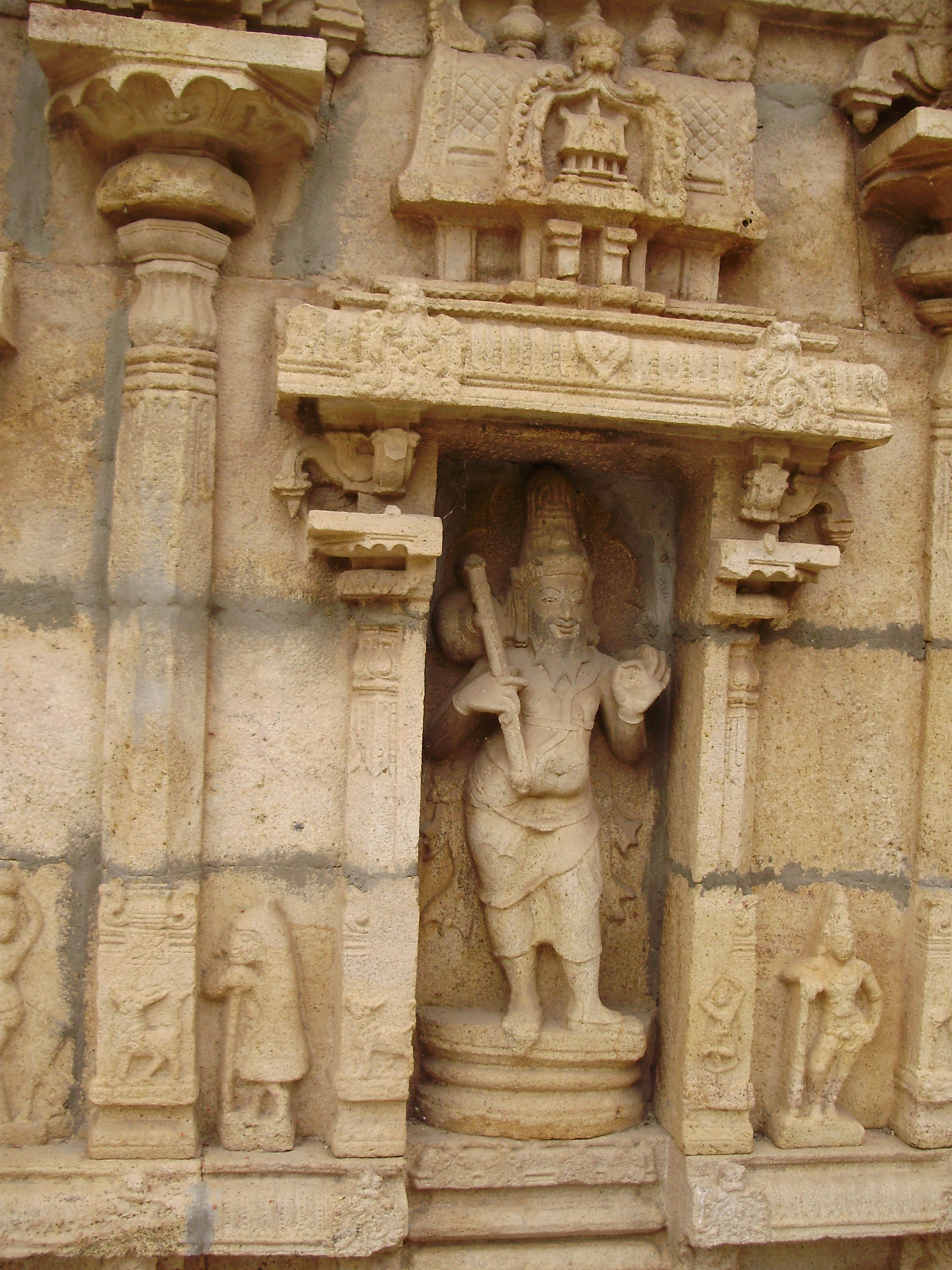
The tradition of a holy man with a one-stringed veena was preserved in this 16th-18th century C.E. sculpture of Sage Agastya. The instrument has some resemblance to the eka-tantri vina, also one-stringed.

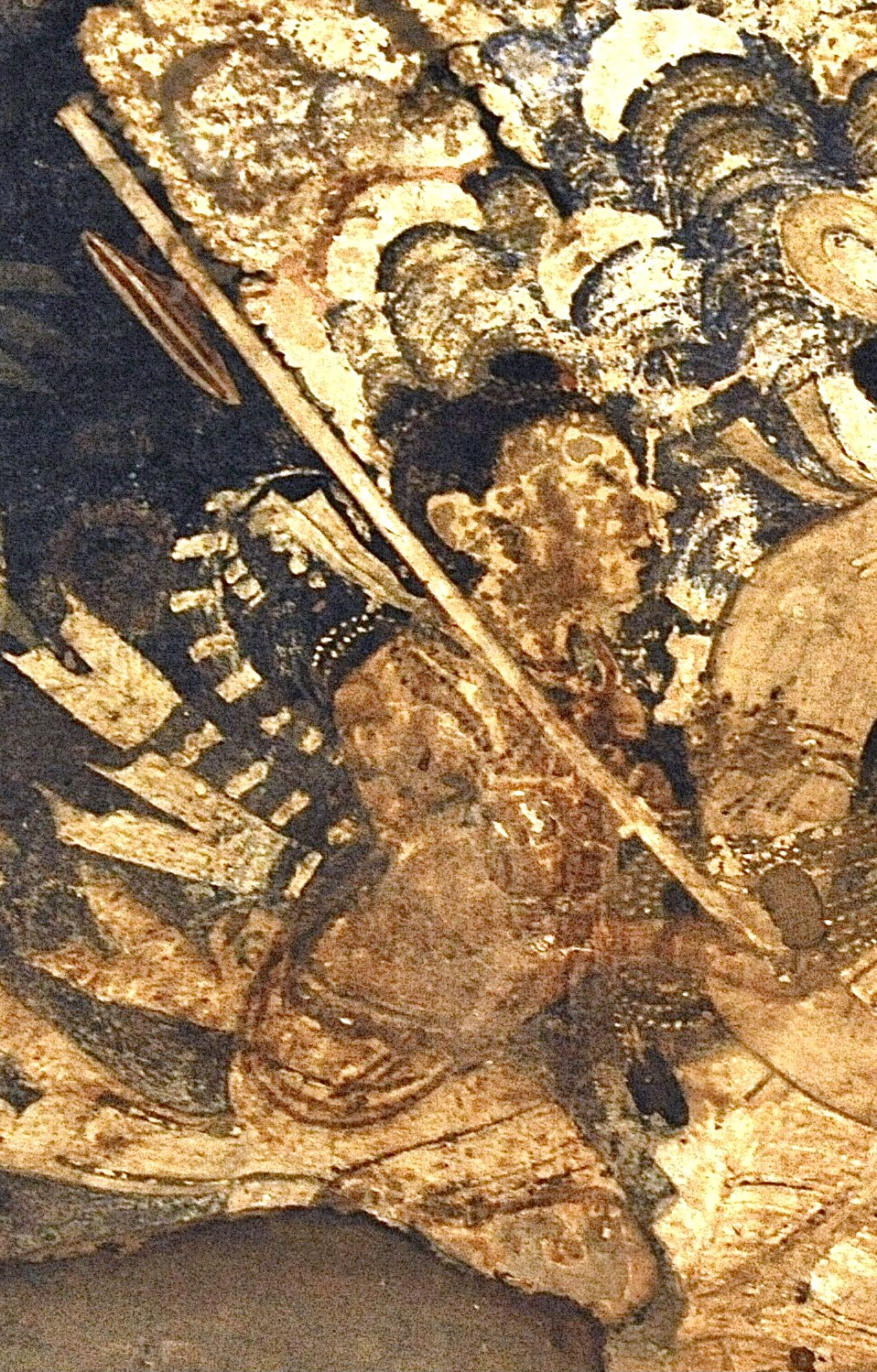
India, 5th century C.E. Ajanta Caves, Cave 17. Image of a one-string drone accompanying religious singing. The musician plucks an alapini vina, a stick-zither style veena resting on his shoulder.

== See also ==
- Tumbi, Punjabi musical instrument
- Kendara
