= Parry–Daniels map =

Mathematical function related to dynamical systems

In mathematics, the Parry–Daniels map is a function studied in the context of dynamical systems. Typical questions concern the existence of an invariant or ergodic measure for the map.

It is named after the English mathematician Bill Parry and the British statistician Henry Daniels, who independently studied the map in papers published in 1962.

== Definition ==
Given an integer n ≥ 1, let Σ denote the n-dimensional simplex in R^{n+1} given by

$$\Sigma := \{ x = (x_0, x_1, \dots, x_n) \in \mathbb{R}^{n + 1} | 0 \leq x_i \leq 1 \mbox{ for each } i \mbox{ and } x_0 + x_1 + \dots + x_n = 1 \}.$$

Let π be a permutation such that

$$x_{\pi(0)} \leq x_{\pi (1)} \leq \dots \leq x_{\pi (n)}.$$

Then the Parry–Daniels map

$$T_{\pi} : \Sigma \to \Sigma$$

is defined by

$$T_\pi (x_0, x_1, \dots, x_n) := \left( \frac{x_{\pi (0)}}{x_{\pi (n)}} , \frac{x_{\pi (1)} - x_{\pi (0)}}{x_{\pi (n)}}, \dots, \frac{x_{\pi (n)} - x_{\pi (n - 1)}}{x_{\pi (n)}} \right).$$
