= Ekram Ali =

Indian poet and critic

Ekram Ali (Bengali: একরাম আলি; born 1 July 1950) is an Indian Bengali poet and critic.

== Life ==
Ali was born in Teghoria (Dist. Birbhum, West Bengal) of a Bengali Muslim parentage. Before he came to Kolkata and took up journalism in a Bengali daily newspaper- Aajkaal, Ekram was brought up in Birbhum.

== Poetry ==
- Atijeebito [অতিজীবিত] (1983).
- Ghanakrishna Aalo [ঘনকৃষ্ণ আলো] (1988) and (sristi edition:2000) ISBN 81-7870-129-4.
- Aandhar Taranga [আঁধারতরঙ্গ] (1991).
- Baanraajpur [বাণরাজপুর] (2000) ISBN 978-81-85479-79-8.
- Ekram Alir Kobita [একরাম আলির কবিতা] (2001).
- Ekram Alir Shreshtha Kobita [একরাম আলির শ্রেষ্ঠ কবিতা] (2008) ISBN 978-81-295-0778-5.
- Pralaykatha [প্রলয়কথা] (2009).
- Andhar poridhi [আঁধার পরিধি] (2013).
- Bautir kobita [বাউটির কবিতা] (2014).
- Kobita sangraha [কবিতা সংগ্রহ] (2017) ISBN 978-93-82879-87-9.
- bipanna Granthipunja [বিপন্ন গ্রন্থিপুঞ্জ] (2017).
- Pora Matir Ghori [পোড়া মাটির ঘড়ি] (2020).

== Memoir ==
- Dhulopaye [ধুলোপায়ে] (2015, 2019) ISBN 978-93-88351-56-0
- Harrison Road [হ্যারিসন রোড] (2020) ISBN 978-93-89377-92-7

== Novel ==
- Digonter Ektu Age [দিগন্তের একটু আগে] (2015) ISBN 978-81-295-2425-6

== Essays ==
- Musalman Bangalir Lokachar [মুসলমান বাঙালির লোকাচার] (2006).
- Apollor paakhi [অ্যাপোলোর পাখি] (2008) ISBN 978-81-7990-080-2.
- Bedonatur Alokrekha [বেদনাতুর আলোকরেখা] (2020) ISBN 978-93-89377-86-6.

== Biography ==
- Atish Dipankar [অতীশ দীপংকর] (1997)

== Awards ==
- Birendra Puraskar for 'Ghanakrishna Alo' in 1990.
- Paschim Banga Bangla Academy Award for 'Dulopaye' in 2016.
