= Anil Kumar Gayen =

Indian mathematician and statistician (1919-1978)

Anil Kumar Gayen FRSS, FCPS
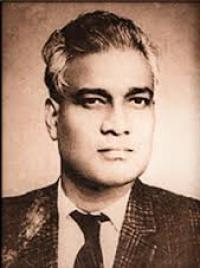
- Born: 1 February 1919; Lakkhi, Bengal Presidency, British India (now in Purba Medinipur, West Bengal, India)
- Died: 7 February 1978 (aged 59); Kolkata, India
- Scientific career
- Education: Rajabazar Science College (University of Calcutta); University of Cambridge
- Known for: Pearson product-moment correlation coefficient Vidyasagar University
- Awards: FRSS; FCPS
- Fields: Mathematics and Statistics
- Workplaces: University of Cambridge; University of Calcutta; Presidency College, Calcutta/Rajabazar Science College; Indian Statistical Institute; Indian Institute of Technology Kharagpur
- Doctoral advisor: Henry Ellis Daniels

Anil Kumar Gayen FRSS FCPS (1 February 1919 – 7 February 1978) was an Indian mathematician and statistician who is best known for his works on the Pearson product-moment correlation coefficient in the field of applied statistics, with his colleague Ronald Fisher. He received his Ph.D. from the University of Cambridge under the supervision of Henry Ellis Daniels, who was the then President of the Royal Statistical Society. He was honoured as a Fellow of the Royal Statistical Society and the Cambridge Philosophical Society.

Gayen was the president of the statistics section of the Indian Science Congress Association, as well as the head of the Department of Mathematics at the Indian Institute of Technology Kharagpur. He later went on to found Vidyasagar University, naming it after the famous social reformer of the Bengali Renaissance, Ishwar Chandra Vidyasagar.

== Early life ==
Anil Kumar Gayen was born in an impoverished Bengali Mahishya family of a village named Lakkhi in Purba Medinipur, West Bengal, to Jibankrishna Gayen and Panchami Devi. His father having died in his childhood, he and his siblings were brought up by his widowed mother under economic hardship. He started his education in an informal local school and was admitted to a formal school when he was eight. In his schooldays, he showed particular interest in English and mathematics, subjects he was primarily taught by his mother. Upon finishing school, he travelled to Kolkata to study mathematics from Surendranath College, followed by a master's degree in applied mathematics from the Rajabazar Science College, University of Calcutta. He was declared the University Gold Medalist for the year 1943.

== Career ==
After briefly teaching at Presidency College and Bengal Engineering College, Gayen married Krishna Chongdar, the daughter of a famous and wealthy Bengali businessman. He travelled to England in 1947, to pursue his Ph.D. from the University of Cambridge in mathematical statistics – only to complete it in the year 1950. It was there that he met the famous Henry Ellis Daniels, under whose supervision he wrote most of his papers. He also befriended Sir Ronald Fisher there, and spent much of his time working with him in the field of applied statistics.

After returning to India, he started teaching at the Indian Statistical Institute as well as the University of Calcutta, and finally joined the Indian Institute of Technology Kharagpur, where he spent most of his remaining career. During his years at Kharagpur, he began to work on educational projects such as the National Council for Educational Research and Training (NCERT) to reform the education sector in Bengal. This interest in revolutionizing education eventually led to the inception of Vidyasagar University, which he founded with the vision of having a non-traditional teaching and learning environment at the University level. The university was finally established by the University Grants Commission (India) under the Vidyasagar University Act of 1981.

== Legacy and death ==
Due to his efforts to revolutionise education in Bengal, he became a key figure in the latter half of the Bengali Renaissance, as well as a renowned scholar and academic. In 2012, Vidyasagar University announced the establishment of the Anil Kumar Gayen Memorial Lecture, in honour of his contributions to the university, and to Bengal as a whole. On 1 February 2019, Dr.Abhijit Guha, Former Professor of Anthropology, Vidyasagar University delivered the Anil Gayen Birth Centenary Memorial Lecture. An elaborate version of the lecture was published in South Asian Anthropologist.

He died a week after his birthday, on 7 February 1978, of natural causes at his residence in Kolkata, India. His descendants still live in Kolkata, as well as abroad.
