= Parvathy Baul =

Indian folk singer (born c. 1975/76)

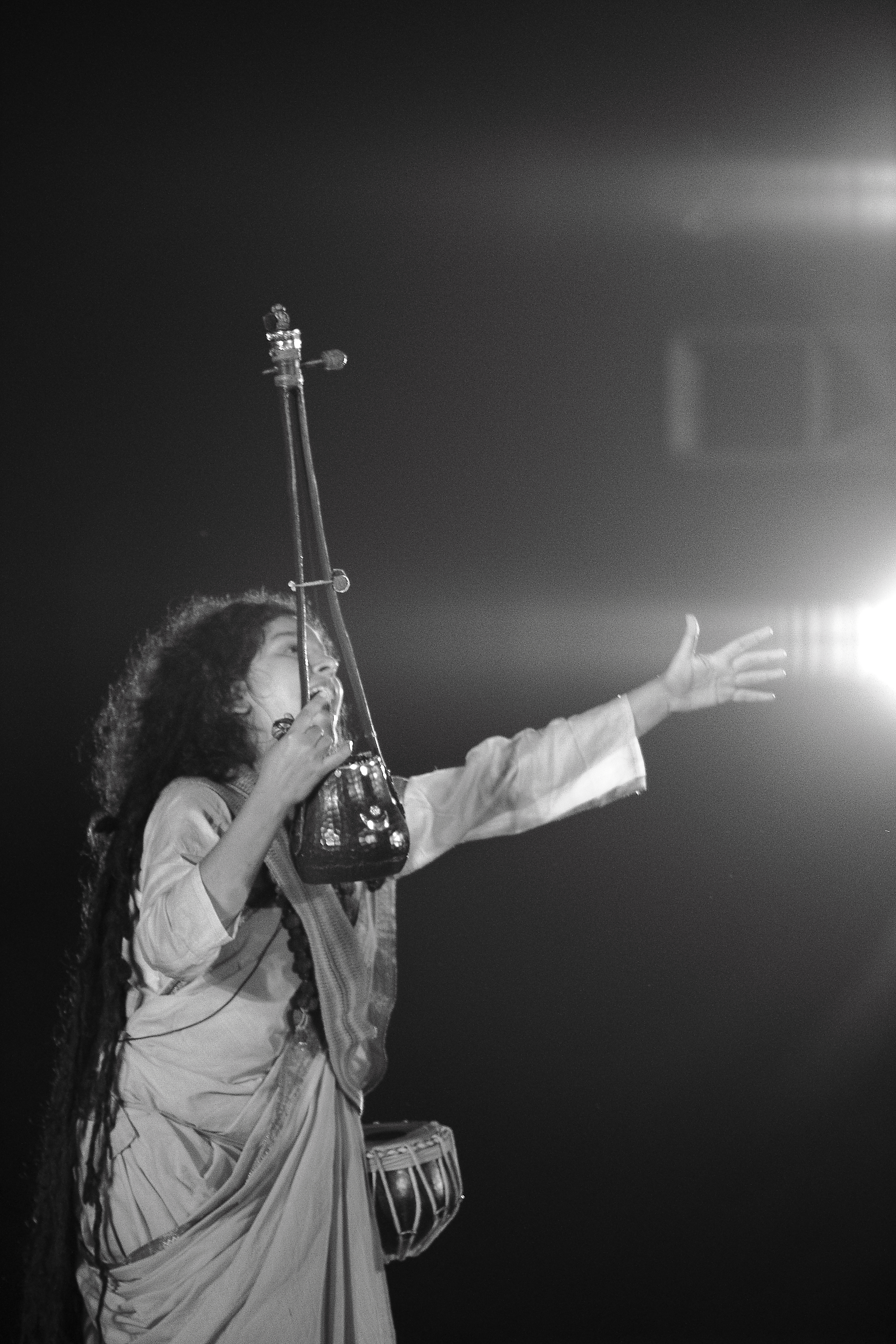
Parvati Baul at Ruhaniyat mystic music festival, at Purana Qila, Delhi, 2011

Parvati Baul is a Baul folk singer, musician and storyteller from Bengal and one of the leading Baul musicians in India. Trained under Baul gurus, Sanatan Das Baul, Shashanko Goshai Baul in Bengal, she has been performing both in India and other countries since 1995.

She is married to Ravi Gopalan Nair, a noted Pava Kathakali glove puppet artist, and is based in Thiruvananthapuram in Kerala, since 1997, where she also runs, "Ektara Baul Sangeetha Kalari" a school for Baul music.

== Early life and background ==
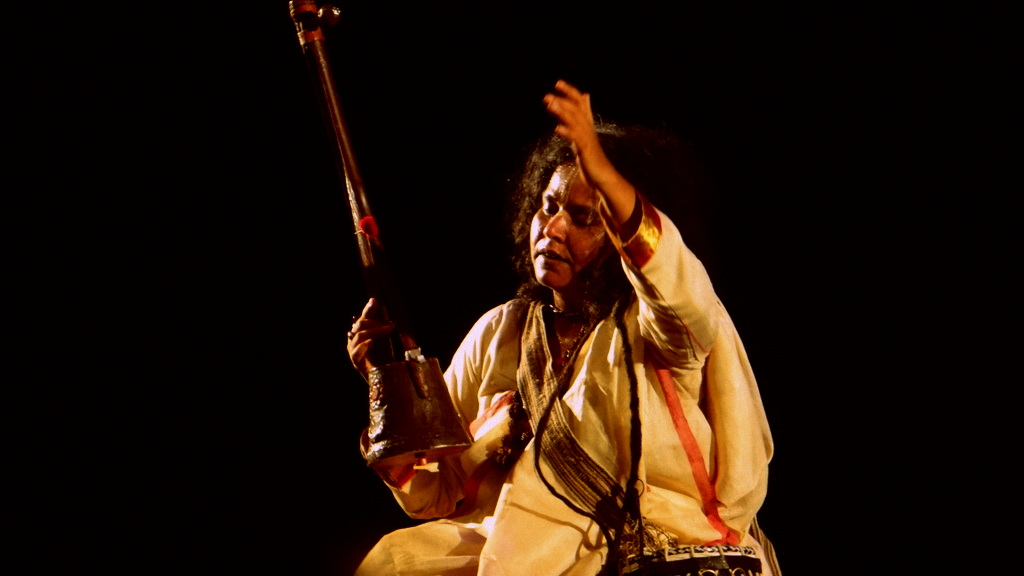
Parvathy in Kolkata, 2015

Parvathy Baul was born in 1975 or 1976 as Mousumi Parial, in a traditional Bengali Brahmin family in West Bengal. Her family was originally from East Bengal, and migrated to West Bengal after the partition of India. Her father, an engineer with the Indian Railways, was keen on Indian classical music and often took his daughter to concerts. Her mother, a housewife, was a devotee of mystic saint Ramakrishna. Due to her father's posting at various locations in the region, she grew up in Assam, Cooch Behar, and bordering areas of West Bengal. She passed higher secondary examination from Suniti Academy, Cooch Behar.

In her early years, she learnt Kathak, a classical dance, from Srilekha Mukherjee. She received training as a visual artist at Kala Bhavan, an art school at Visva-Bharati University, Santiniketan. Though she received her early music training in Hindustani classical music, it was on a train to Santiniketan campus, that she first heard a blind Baul singer, performing the traditional music of mystic minstrels from Bengal. This was followed by meeting Phulmala Dashi, a woman Baul singer who frequented the campus. Soon, she started learning music from Phulmala and also visited several Baul ashrams, later Phulamala advised her to find another teacher. During this period, she watched a performance by Sanatan Das Baul, an 80-year-old Baul singer from the Bankura in West Bengal. Deciding to learn from him, she visited his ashram in Sonamukhi in Bankura district. After 15 days, she received her diksha initiation from him, and he became her first guru. For the next seven years, she travelled with her guru, providing vocal support during performances, learning Baul songs, Baul dance, and playing ektara and duggi, a small kettle-drum strapped to the waist. Finally, he allowed her to sing on her own and soon she was led to her next guru Shashanko Goshai Baul. Goshai, who was 97-year-old at the time and lived in Khoirboni, a small village in the Bankura district. He was initially hesitant to take on a female disciple, thus tested her dedication for a few days, before taking her on. In the remaining three years of his life, he taught her numerous songs, and intricacies of the Baul tradition.

== Career ==
Though she started performing in 1995, in 1997 she came to Thiruvananthapuram in Kerala, to learn about local spiritual and theatre traditions. Here she met Ravi Gopalan Nair, an Andi Pandaram – a traditional puppeteer from Kerala, who also makes glove puppets or Pava Kathakali. She learnt Grotowski technique used in theatre for him, and in 2000 travelled with him to Bread and Puppet Theater in Vermont, US to study with creator Peter Schumann, known for incorporating puppetry, live-art into theatre performances. Prior to this they worked with the theatre company for five months during Seven Basic Needs exhibition and performances at Expo 2000 in Hanover, Germany, In Thiruvananthapuram, she also met Abdul Salam, a Muslim fakir kalandar, who became her guru, with him she found her musical calling and who taught her about the spiritual meaning of the tradition.

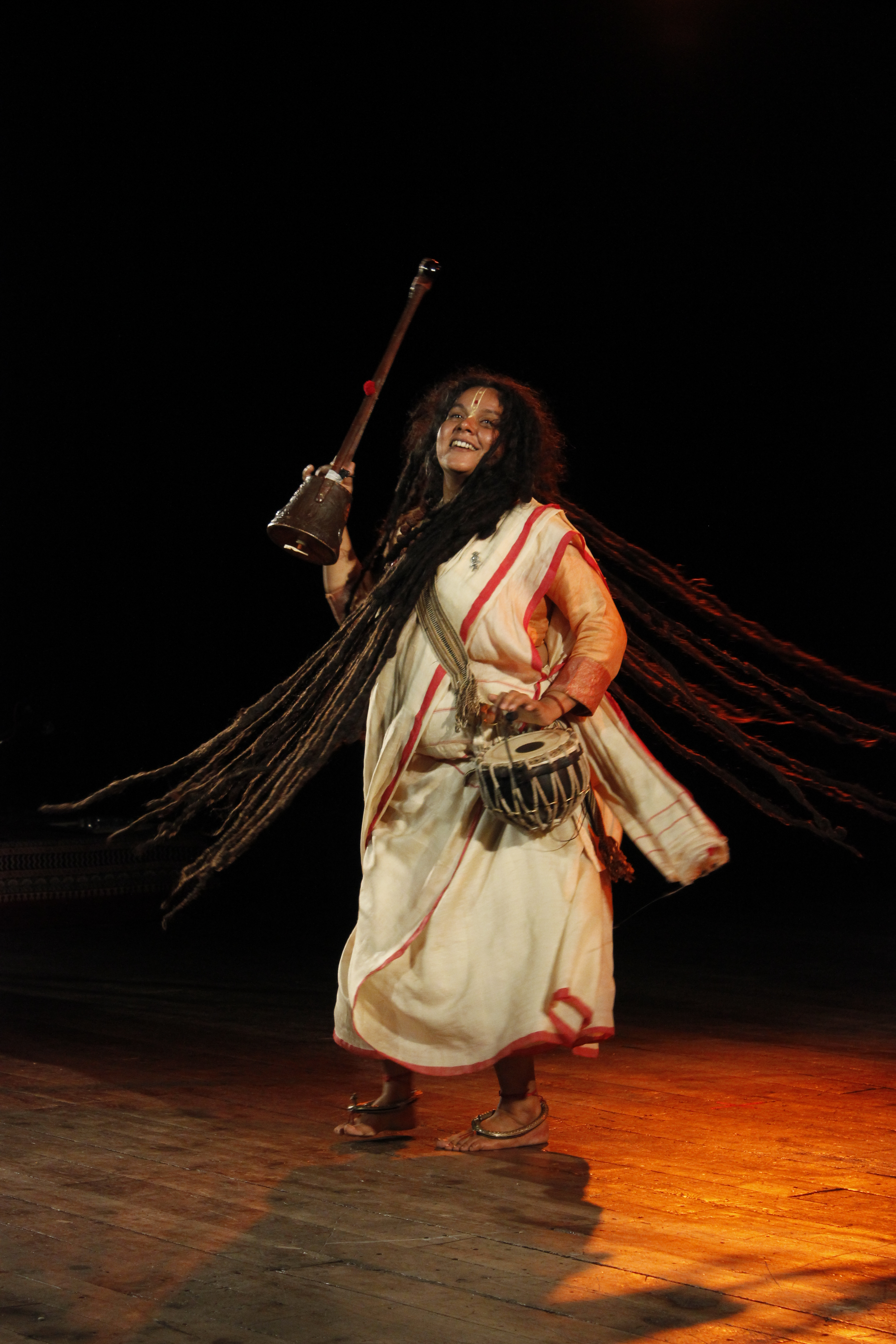
Parvati Baul performing at Bharat Bhavan Bhopal India 2017

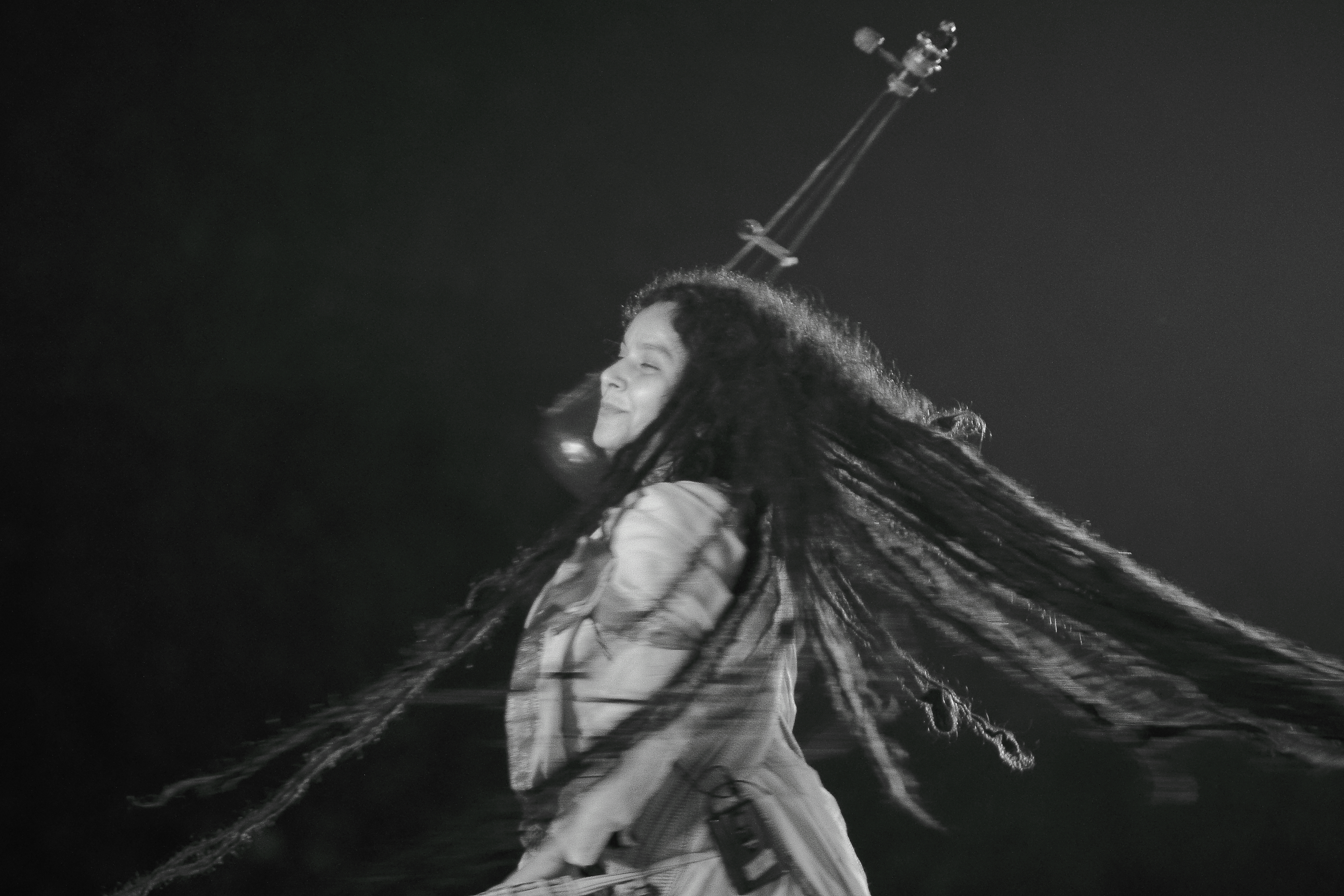
Parvati Baul in concert

Thereafter, in 2001, she decided to devote full-time to Baul tradition, and started performing Baul music, also playing ektara and a duggi as accompanying musical instruments, and the tinkling chilambu nupur metallic anklets. She performs mystic songs both from tradition Baul repertoire and her own doha couplets. She uses elements of theatre and cantastoria or sung stories into her performances by acting out the lyrics or at times adding explanatory speeches in English. Inspired by pattachitra, scroll painters and traditional story-tellers of Bengal, she adds visual elements to performance through painted backdrops. In some her performances, inspired by a work with Schumann, she paints large canvases along with her singing, illustrating the themes of her songs as a live performance art.

In late 1990s, she married her teacher Ravi Gopalan Nair, and has been living in Thiruvananthapuram for the last 15 years. She also runs an "Ektara Baul Sangeetha Kalari", a Baul music gurukul (school) at Nedumangad near Thiruvananthapuram. Yet, like the traditional Baul singers of Bengal, she continues to perform live in remote villages of Kerala, at soirées hosted by local villagers, and also in her native Bengal. Once a year, she also travels to teach Baul music at the International School of Theatre Anthropology (ISTA). Through ISTA she came into contact with the Magdalena Project, an international network of women in theatre and the performing arts, and since 2012 has organised women's performing arts festivals in India under the name Tantidhatri and in association with the Magdalena Project. Tantidhatri festivals have been held in Pondicherry and Auroville (2012), Bangalore (2016) and Kolkata (2019).

In 2005, she published Songs of the Great Soul, a book about her journey into the Baul tradition, provides a rare insight into an educated woman's foray into the tradition, which has been male preserve and mostly flourished in rural areas, where women were often caregivers and companions to Bauls at ashrams, few took to singing and the itinerant lifestyle.

In February 2019, she was conferred Sangeet Natak Akademi Award, by Government of India for her contribution to the ancient Baul tradition. She is now creating a dedicated learning center for Baul tradition in Bengal.

Over the years, she performed at various concerts all over India and other countries, including at Ruhaniyat – The All India Sufi & Mystic Music Festival and One Billion Rising.

== Supporting the Baul Tradition ==
In 2017, Parvathy Baul founded Sanatan Siddhashram in Bhirbum, West Bengal, a center aiming to foster the Baul tradition.

== Works ==
- Baul, Parvathy (2005). Song of the Great Soul: An Introduction to the Baul Path. Ekatara Baul Sangeetha Kalari.

== Filmography ==
- Neeravam (2021)
- The Bengal Files (2025)
