= Anish Deb =

Indian writer (1951–2021)

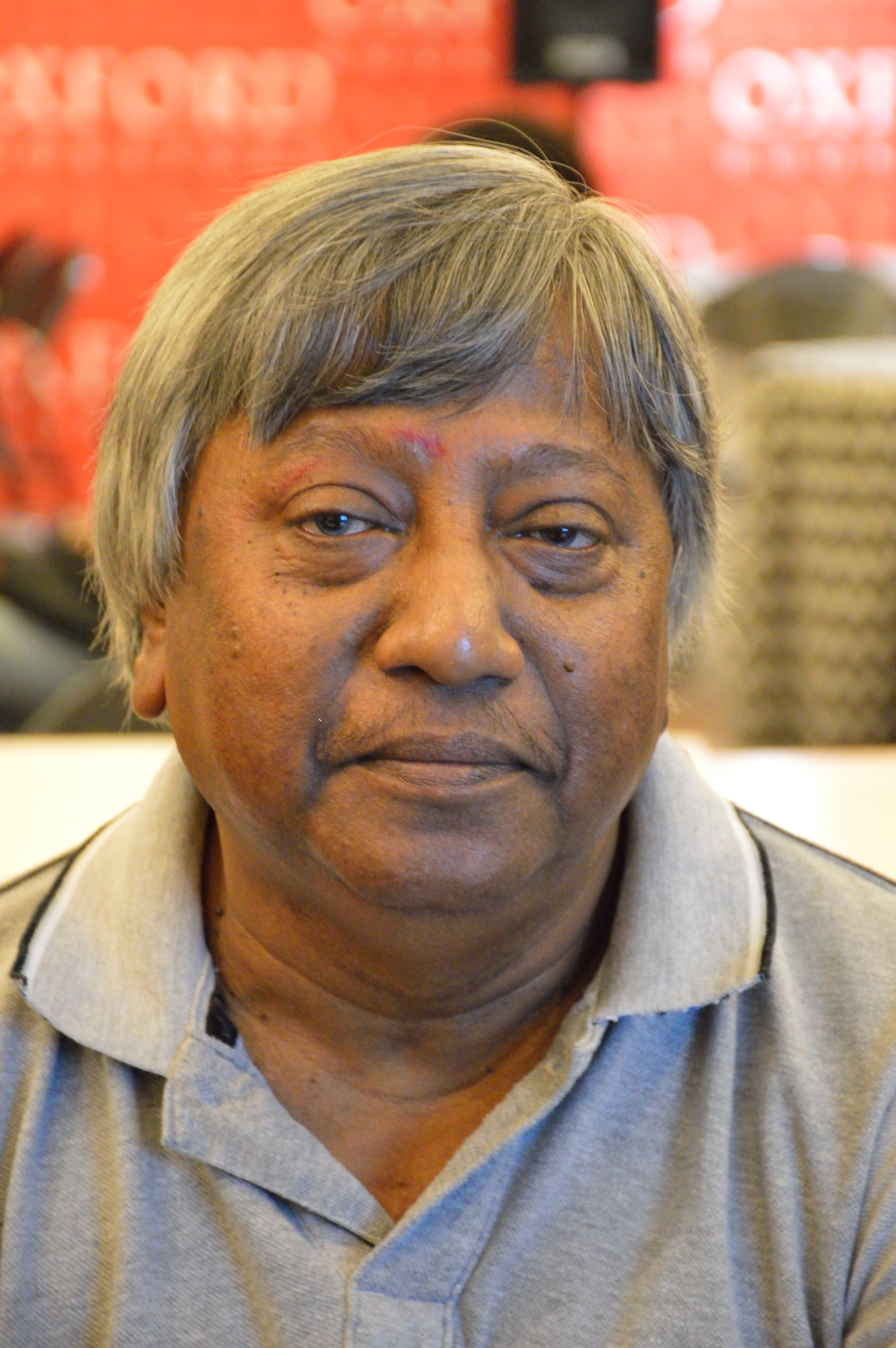
- Born: 22 October 1951; Kolkata, India
- Died: 28 April 2021 (aged 69); Kolkata, India
- Education: University of Calcutta; B.Tech., M.Tech. and Ph.D.(tech)

Anish Deb (22 October 1951 – 28 April 2021) was an Indian Bengali writer and academic. He was noted for his writings in the science fiction and thriller genre. He received several literary awards including Vidyasagar Award in 2019.

== Early life ==
Anish Deb was born in 1951 in Kolkata. He completed his B.Tech. (1974), M.Tech. (1976) and Ph.D. (Tech.) with 1 silver and 2 university gold medals in Applied Physics from the Department of Applied Physics of University of Calcutta.

== Career ==
Anish Deb started his writing career in 1968. He also edited a number of collections of popular fictions, novels and detective stories. Some of his notable writings are: Ghaser Sheesh Nei, Saper Chokh, Teerbiddho, Teish Ghanta Shat Minute, Hate Kalome Computer, Bignyaner Dashdiganto, Jibon Jokhon Phuriye Jay.

== Death ==
Deb died following COVID-19 in Kolkata on 28 April 2021.
