= Ruhaniyat – The All India Sufi & Mystic Music Festival =

Music festival in India

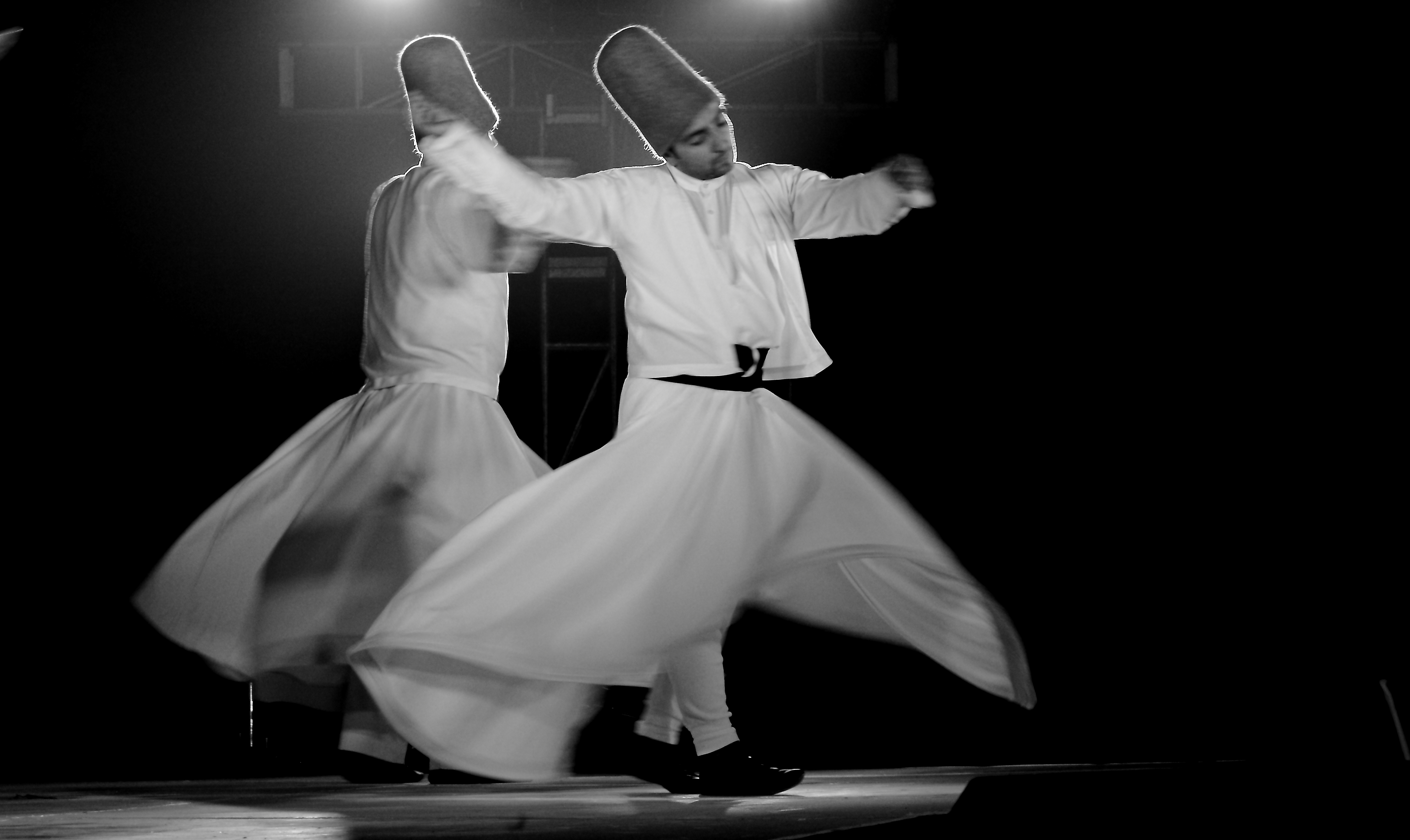
- Dates: Between November and March
- Years active: 2001–present
- Founders: Banyan Tree Events
- Website: http://www.ruhaniyat.com

Ruhaniyat – The All India Sufi & Mystic Music Festival is a music festival held across India. It is organised by Mumbai-based cultural organisation Banyan Tree Events between November and March every year. This Sufi festival is one of the biggest of its kind, and is held in Mumbai, Delhi, Bangalore, Chennai, Kolkata, Pune and Hyderabad. Musicians from various parts of India – sufi qawwals, mystic musicians, Kabir panthis, and Bauls – perform at the festival.

== History ==
The Ruhaniyat festival started in 2001, the brainchild of Mahesh Babu and Nandini Mahesh, the Directors of Banyan Tree Events, to promote sufi and mystic music has evolved into a prestigious event.

== The festival ==
Ruhaniyat means Soulfulness. The festival features the best of maestros in classical, folk and sufi music, discovered from the interiors of remote Indian villages, Turkey, Egypt, Syria etc.

== Performers ==
Parvathy Baul, Warsi Brothers, Ateeq Hussain Khan, Jari Sufi compositions of Azan Fakir of Manipur, Hafiza Begum Chaudhury, Kabirpanthis Prahlad Tippania from Devas in Madhya Pradesh, Jagar music by Rakesh Bhatt, Vithal Rao etc.

== Gallery ==
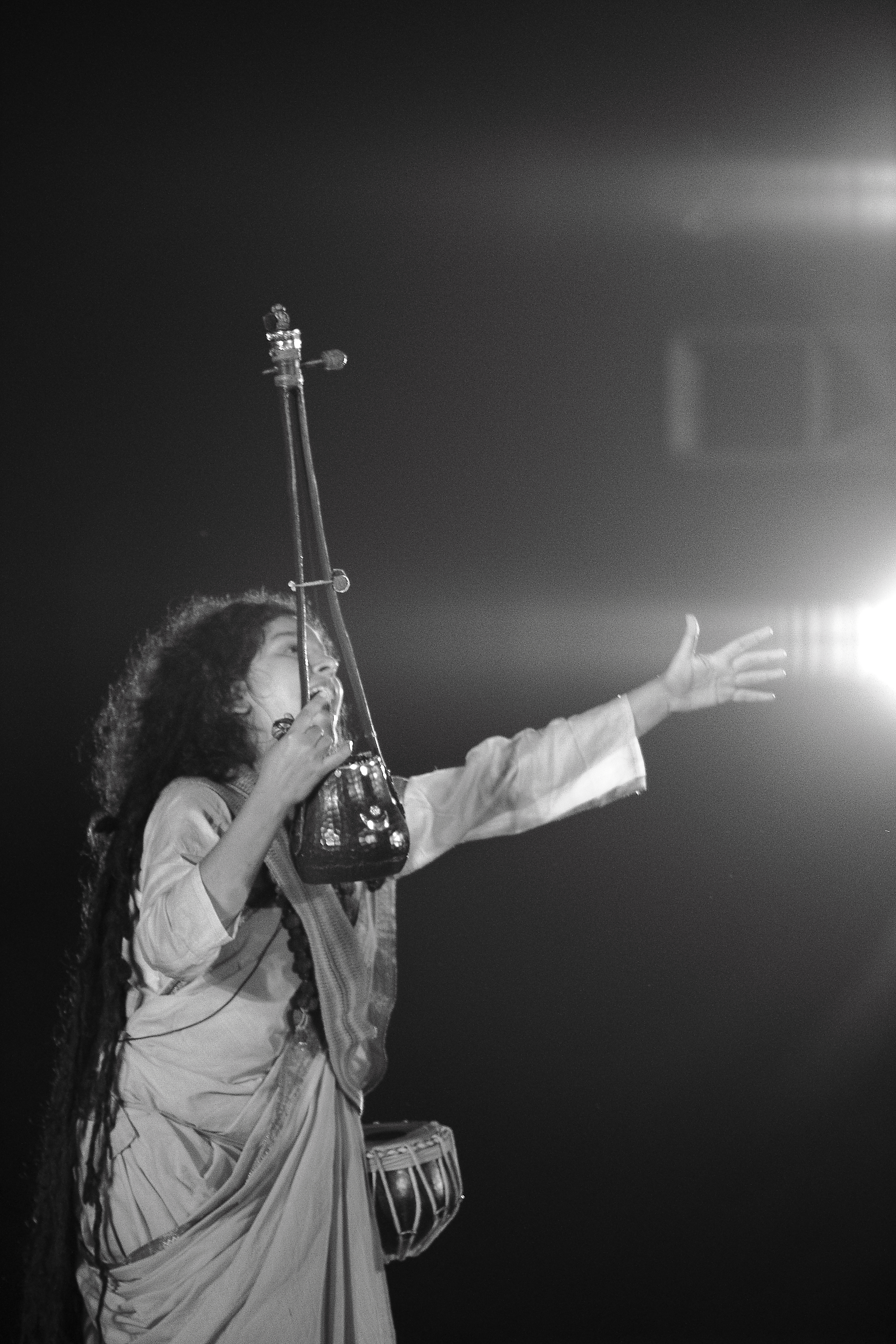

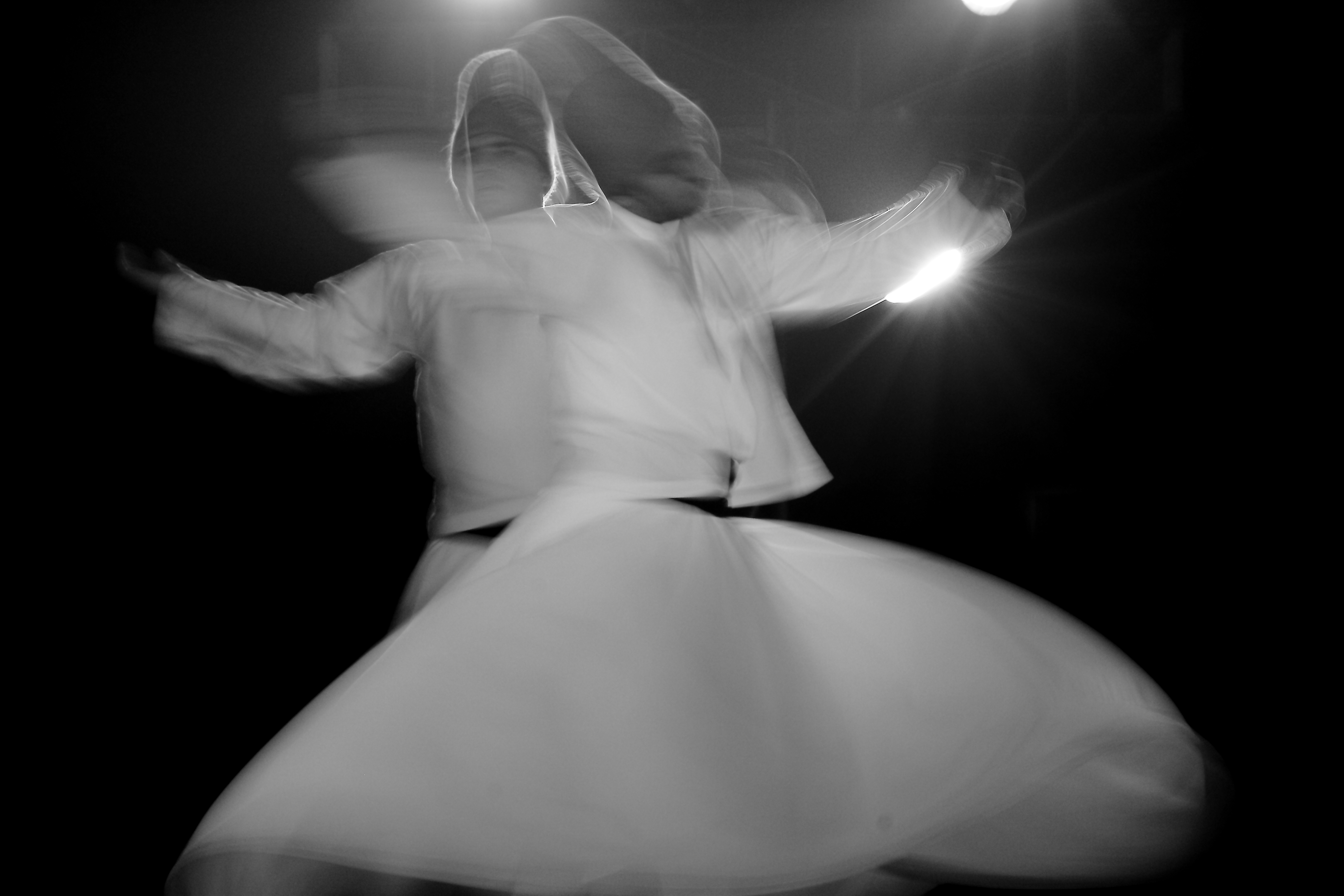

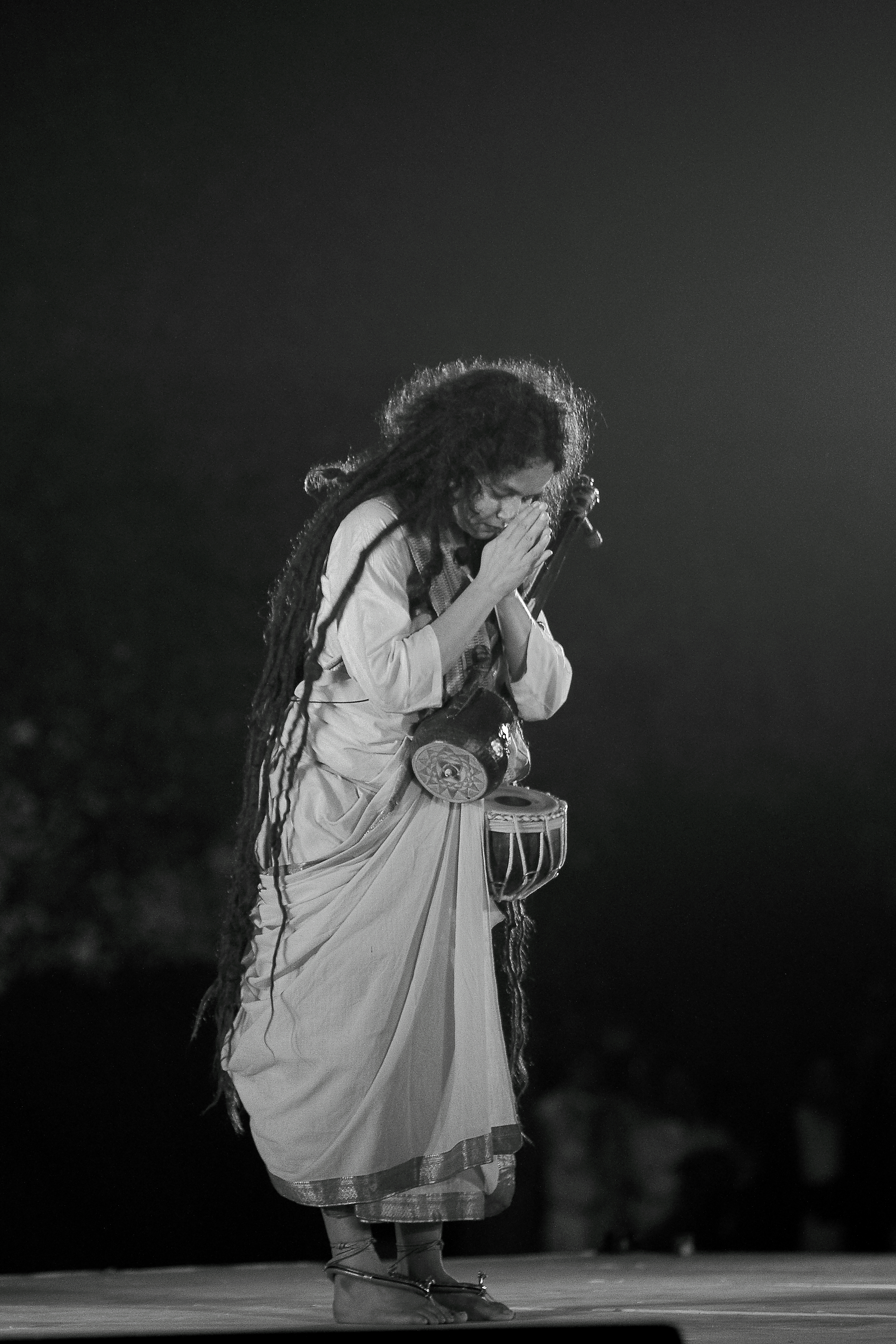
