= Shuddhaanandaa Brahmachari =

Indian motivational speaker

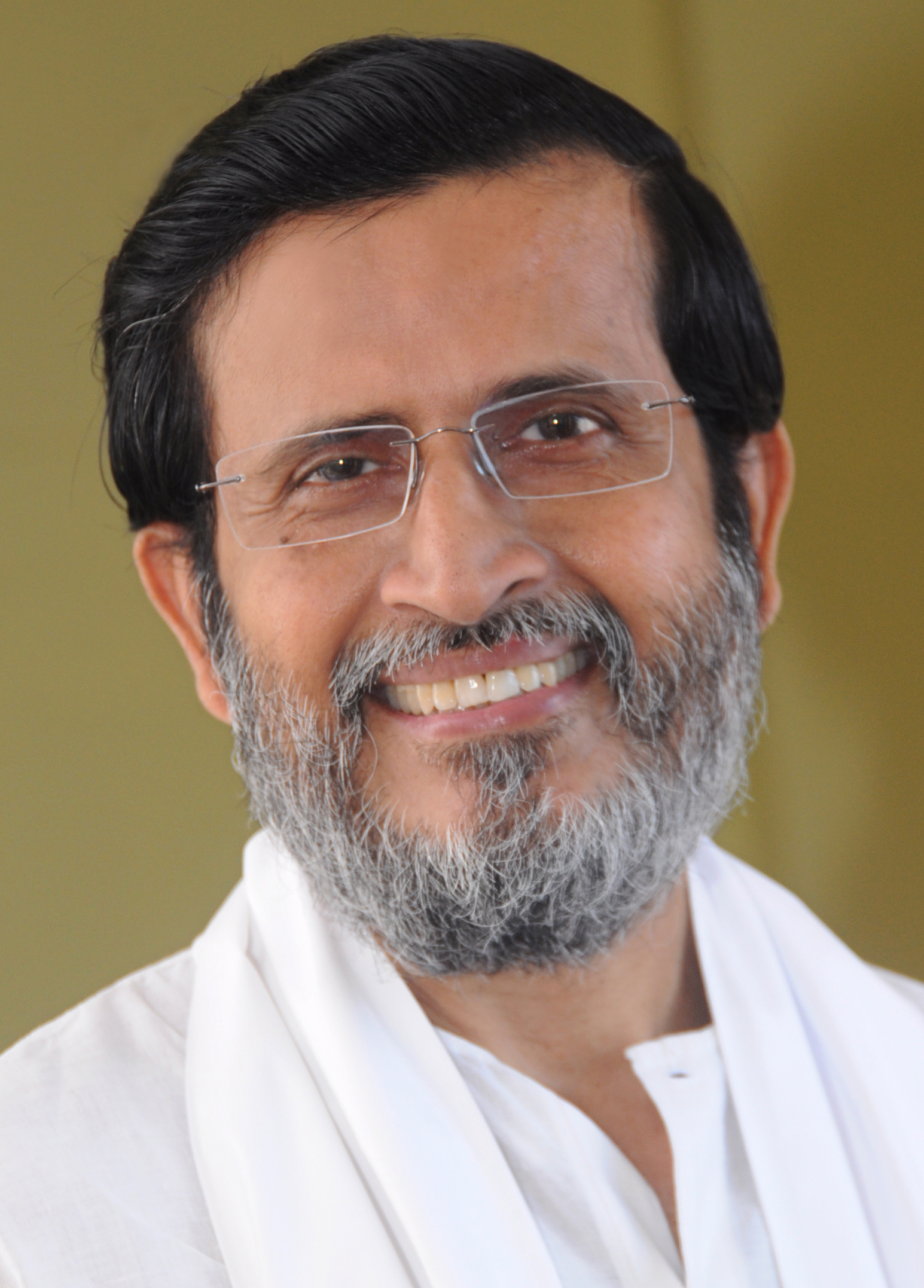
- Born: 10 May 1949 (age 77); Kolkata, India
- Occupations: Author, Motivational speaker, Humanitarian

Shuddhaanandaa Brahmachari born 10 May 1949, (often referred to as simply Bodhi) is an author, motivational speaker, spiritual teacher and humanitarian. He lives in Kolkata, India, where he founded and is the current mentor of Lokenath Divine Life Mission. He has authored several books and travels internationally, speaking on stress reduction, mindfulness and meditation and microcredit.

== Early life and career ==
He received a Master of Commerce degree in 1972 at Andhra University, Visakhapatnam and taught Commerce at Andhra Vidyalaya College (affiliated to Osmania University). From 1972–1976 he was a lecturer of Commerce at Andhra Vidyalaya College, (affiliated to Osmania University) in Hyderabad, India.

== Humanitarian work ==
He founded Lokenath Divine Life Mission (LDLM) in 1985 in Kolkata, West Bengal, India. Lokenath Divine Life Mission works in the field of education, health care and women's empowerment, utililizing microcredit self-help programs.

A former professor of economics, Brahmachari’s model aims at direct credit linkage between banks and SHGs, completely eliminating agencies that play the middleman, such as NGOs. LDLM’s role is to create SHGs through awareness, training and organisation and then enable their credit linkage with the banks.

LDLM also performs resource linkage as well as addressing targeted areas of need and collaborating with other organizations on additional programs.

== Motivational and spiritual teacher ==
In 2005, he founded the Stress Management Academy, and began conducting global seminars on breathing, relaxation, meditation, mindfulness and positive thinking for schools, corporations, hospitals, prisons and other venues under his Course of Mindfulness program.

== Awards and major speaking engagements ==
He addressed the Parliament of World Religion in Chicago, (1993) and Barcelona (2004), was a keynote speaker at the Global Youth Conference held at the Capital Center, Washington, DC (1993), and was a special invitee to the United Nations World Millennium Summit of spiritual leaders in New York, (2000). He was a keynote speaker at the International Conference on Spiritual Paradigm for Surmounting Global Management Crisis in Varanasi, India in 2012, 2013. He was keynote speaker at the Origin Group, Bahrain Annual Conference on The Power Within, 2014, and the Women’s Economic Forum (WEF), New Delhi, 2016, where he was awarded the Iconic Leaders in Peace and Change Award. He received a Lifetime Achievement Award from the S.T.A.R foundation at the House of Lords in the United Kingdom on 21 July 2015 for his "invaluable and outstanding contribution to society". He was presented the Award by The Rt Hon, Lord Hunt of Wirral MBE

== Books ==
- The Incredible Life of a Himalayan Yogi: The Times, Teachings and Life of Living Shiva Baba Lokenath, 2014
- Your Mind, Your Best Friend, 2003
- Cleaning the Mirror of Mind: Clutter Free Home, Clutter Free Mind, 2013
- Living with My Himalayan Master Sri Sri Bhajan Brahmachari-A Biography, 2020
- Quintessence of Sai Satcharitra: A Biography of the Incredible Sai Baba of Shirdi, 2023
- La vita con il mio Maestro dell’Himalaya : Biografia di Sri Sri Bhajan Brahmachari (Italian Edition), 2023
- Tu Mente, Tu Mejor Amistad: 30 Días para tu consciente mente amistosa (Spanish Edition), 2014

Shuddhaanandaa Brahmachari is also a spotlight writer for OM Times e-zine.
