= Sunanda =

Sunanda may refer to

== People ==
- Sunanda Das (born 1974), Indian politician in Odisha
- Sunanda K. Datta-Ray, Indian journalist
- Sunanda Kumariratana (1860–1880), queen consort of Siam
- Sunanda Mahendra (born 1938), Sri Lankan writer
- Sunanda Murali Manohar (1957–2017), Indian-British film producer
- Sunanda Nair, Indian dancer
- Sunanda Patnaik (1934–2020), Indian classical singer
- Sunanda Rajendra Pawar (born 1959), Indian women's rights activist
- Sunanda Pushkar (1962–2014), Indian businesswoman
- Sunanda Sanyal (1934–2022), Indian academic, essayist, and social activist
- Sunanda Sharma (born 1992), Indian singer and actress in Punjabi music and films
- Sunanda Sikdar (born 1951), Indian writer
- Sunanda (singer), South Indian playback singer in Tamil and Malayalam films active 1984 onwards

== Other uses ==
- Sunanda Devi, mountain peak

Hindu mythology

- Another name of Uma
- Mitravinda, a wife of Krishna
- Mother of Bahubali
- Wife of Bharata (Mahabharata)
- Wife of king Pratipa
