= Holde Golap (novel) =

2015 novel by Swapnamoy Chakraborty

Holde Golap (lit. 'The Yellow Rose') is a 2015 Bengali novel by the Indian author Swapnamoy Chakraborty. It portrays the social exclusion of transgender and intersex people of Bengal. An acclaimed work of queer literature, it has received multiple accolades, including the 2012 Ananda Puraskar. It was first serialized in the weekly Robbar magazine between 2012 and 2013, and was published as a book in 2015 by Dey's Publishing. It became instantly successful after its release and stayed in the bestseller list from May to July.

The novel combines a historical approach with precise, accessible prose and frequently uses the slang used within the Hijra community.

== Background ==
The idea for Holde Golap came when Chakraborty worked as a transmission executive at the All India Radio in Kolkata. In 1995, he began a radio show about sex education called Sandhikkhan. One day he received a letter from a mother who was upset that her son was gay, asking why the program said homosexuality was not a disease. This letter inspired Chakraborty to learn more. For the next fifteen years, he met with members of the queer community, interviewed them, and read books, local magazines to build the plot for his novel. He also spoke to medical professionals including plastic surgeons, and other notable social workers such as Manabi Bandopadhyay, who became India's first openly transgender college principal.

== Reception ==
At the time of its release, the novel was lauded for being first of its kind. In recent years, however, scholars have criticized its cisgender gaze, as it relies on a narration style of looking at the trans and queer characters from the outside, and at times, focuses too much on the medical terms instead of the actual lived experience of the characters.

== In popular culture ==
In 2019, Chakraborty alleged that Kaushik Ganguly's fillm Nagarkirtan was plagiarised his novel, though he later retracted the claim.
