= Taslima Nasrin =

Bangladeshi-Swedish feminist writer (born 1962)

- তসলিমা নাসরিন
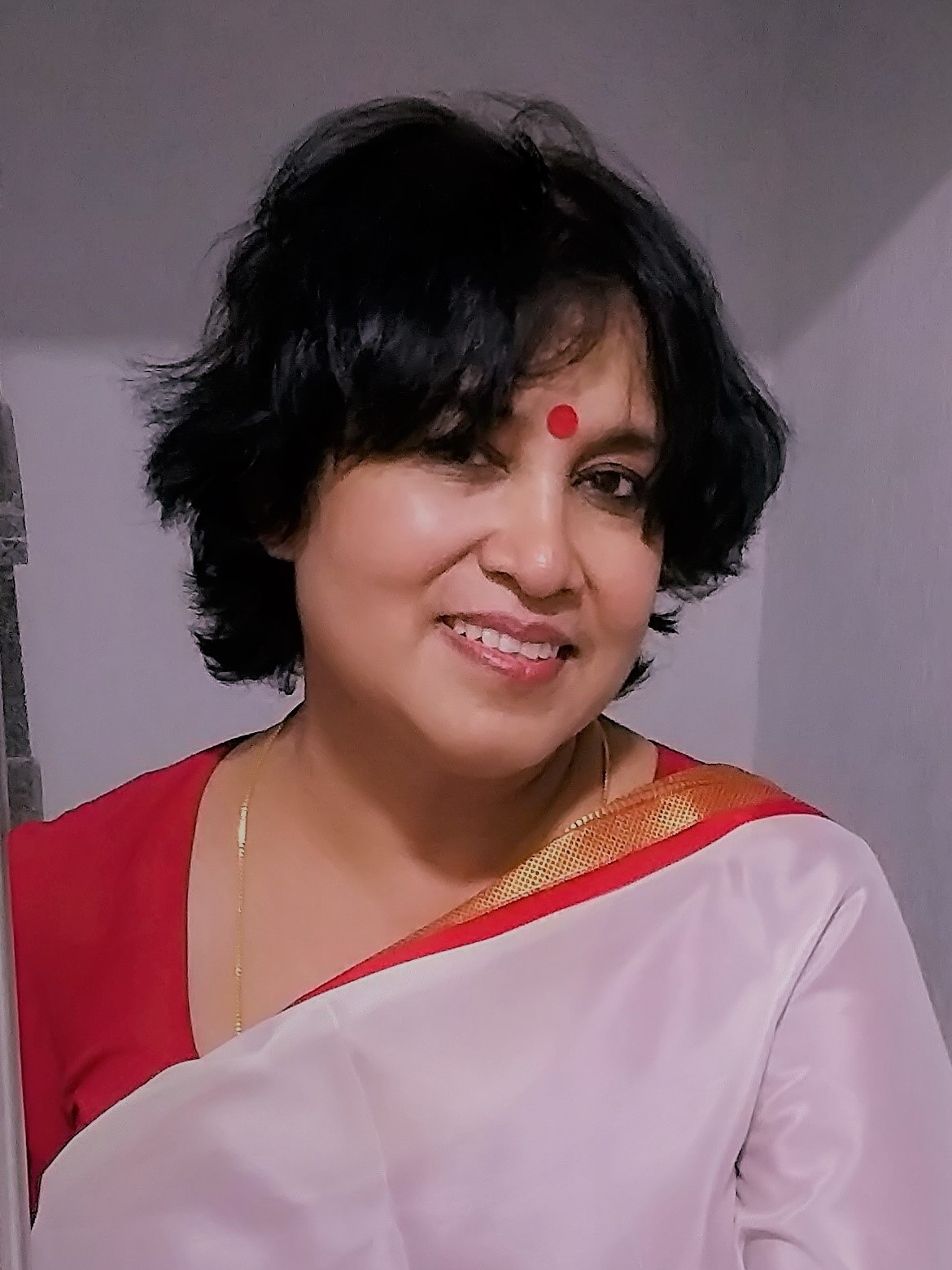
- Nasrin in 2019
- Born: 25 August 1962 (age 64); Mymensingh, East Pakistan
- Education: Mymensingh Medical College
- Occupations: Author; Activist
- Years active: 1973–present
- Movement: Feminism, criticism of Islam, freedom of speech, atheism, scientism, tolerance
- Spouses: Rudra Mohammad Shahidullah (m. 1982; div. 1986); Nayeemul Islam Khan (m. 1990; div. 1991); Minar Mahmud (m. 1991; div. 1992)
- Awards: Sakharov Prize (1994)
- Website: taslimanasrin.com

Signature
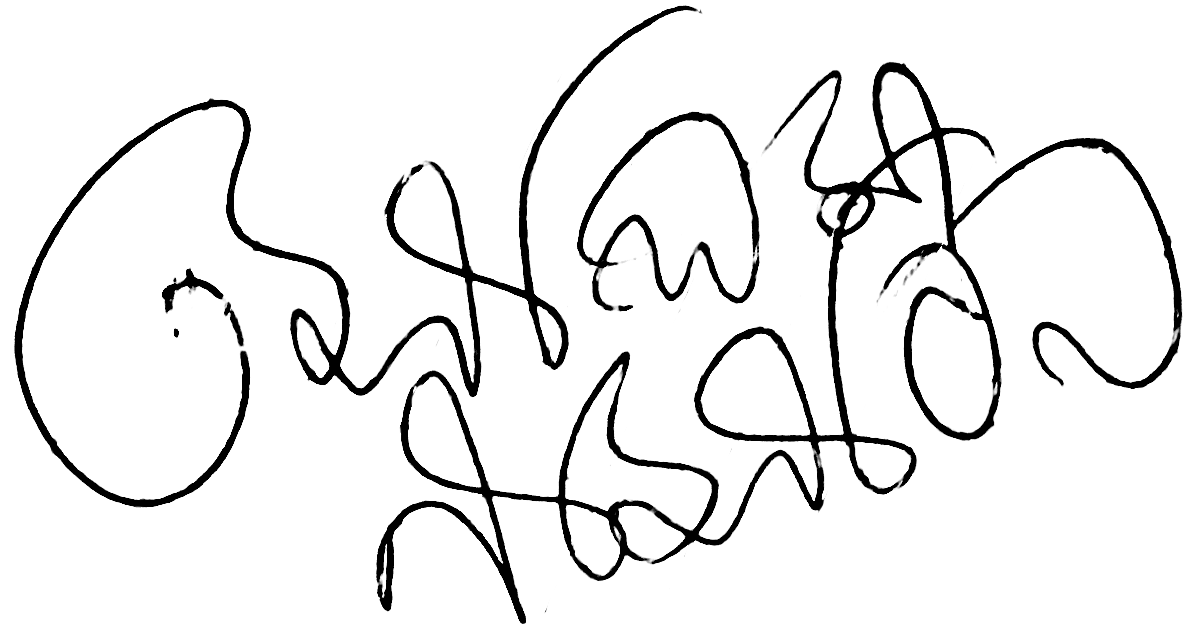

Taslima Nasrin (Note: Bengali: তসলিমা নাসরিন, romanized: Tôslimā Nāsrin; alternatively spelled as Nasreen) (born 25 August 1962) is a Bangladeshi-Swedish writer, physician, feminist, secular humanist, and activist. She is known for her writings on feminism and her criticism of Islam; some of her books are banned in Bangladesh.

She gained global attention by the beginning of the 1990s owing to her essays and novels with feminist views and criticism of what she characterises as all "misogynistic" religions. Nasrin has been living in exile since 1994, with multiple fatwas calling for her death. After living more than a decade in Europe and the United States, she moved to India in 2004 and has been staying there on a resident permit, multiple-entry, or 'X' visa since.

Nasrin has been blacklisted and banished from the Bengal region, including both Bangladesh and the Indian state of West Bengal during the governments of Communist Party of India (Marxist) and Trinamool Congress. After Bharatiya Janata Party's victory in state legislative assembly of West Bengal in 2026, she returned to Kolkata after nearly 20 years in exile from the city.

== Early life and career ==
Nasrin was born in East Pakistan to Dr. Rajab Ali and Edul Ara, of Mymensingh. Her father was a physician, and a professor of Medical Jurisprudence in Mymensingh Medical College, as well as at Sir Salimullah Medical College, Dhaka, and Dhaka Medical College. After completing high school in 1976 (SSC) and higher secondary studies in college (HSC) in 1978, she studied medicine at Mymensingh Medical College, an affiliated medical college of the University of Dhaka, and graduated in 1984 with an MBBS degree. Her Hindu ancestor Haradhan Sarkar was a Kayastha.

In college, she wrote and edited a poetry journal called Shenjuti. After graduation, she worked at a family planning clinic in Mymensingh, then practised at the gynaecology department of Mitford hospital and at the anaesthesia department of Dhaka Medical College hospital. While she studied and practised medicine, she saw girls who had been raped; she also heard women cry out in despair in the delivery room if their baby was a girl. Born into a Muslim family, she became an atheist over time. In the course of writing, she took a feminist approach.

=== Literary career ===
Early in her literary career, Nasrin wrote mainly poetry, and published half a dozen collections of poetry between 1982 and 1993, often with female oppression as a theme, and often containing very graphic language. She started publishing prose in the late 1980s and produced three collections of essays and four novels before the publication of her documentary novel Lajja (Bengali: লজ্জা, romanized: Lôjja, lit. 'Shame'), in which a Hindu family was attacked by Muslim fanatics and decided to leave the country. Nasrin suffered a number of physical and other attacks for her critical scrutiny of Islam and her demands for women's equality. Hundreds of thousands of people took to the streets demanding her execution by hanging. In October 1993, a radical fundamentalist group called the Council of Islamic Soldiers offered a bounty for her death.

In May 1994, she was interviewed by the Kolkata edition of The Statesman, which quoted her as calling for a revision of the Quran; she claimed she only called for abolition of the Sharia, the Islamic religious law. In August 1994, she was brought up on "charges of making inflammatory statements" and faced criticism from Islamic fundamentalists. A few hundred thousand demonstrators called her "an apostate appointed by imperial forces to vilify Islam"; a member of a militant faction threatened to set loose thousands of poisonous snakes in the capital unless she was executed. After spending two months in hiding, she escaped to Sweden at the end of 1994, consequently ceasing her medical practice and becoming a full-time writer and activist.

== Life in exile ==
Leaving Bangladesh towards the end of 1994, Nasrin lived in exile in Western Europe and North America for ten years. Her Bangladeshi passport had been revoked; she was granted citizenship by the Swedish government and took refuge in Germany. She allegedly had to wait six years (1994–1999) to get a visa to visit India. In 1998, she wrote Meyebela, My Bengali Girlhood, her biographical account from birth to adolescence. She never got a Bangladeshi passport to return to the country to visit her parents, both of whom are now deceased.

=== 2004–2007, life in Kolkata ===
In 2004, she was granted a renewable temporary residential permit by India and moved to Kolkata in the state of West Bengal, which shares a common heritage and language with Bangladesh, In an interview in 2007, after she had been forced to flee, she called Kolkata her home. The government of India extended her visa to stay in the country on a periodic basis, though it refused to grant her Indian citizenship. While living in Kolkata, Nasrin regularly contributed to Indian newspapers and magazines, including Anandabazar Patrika and Desh, and, for some time, wrote a weekly column in the Bengali version of The Statesman.

Again, her criticism of Islam was met with opposition from religious fundamentalists: in June 2006, Syed Noorur Rehaman Barkati, the imam of Kolkata's Tipu Sultan Mosque, admitted offering money to anyone who "blackened [that is, publicly humiliated] Ms Nasreen's face." Even abroad, controversy followed: on the US Independence Day weekend in 2005, she criticised US foreign policy and tried to read her poem titled "America" to a large Bengali crowd at the North American Bengali Conference at Madison Square Garden in New York City, but was booed off the stage. Back in India, the "All India Muslim Personal Board (Jadeed)" offered 500,000 rupees for her beheading in March 2007. The group's president, Tauqeer Raza Khan, said the only way the bounty would be lifted was if Nasrin "apologizes, burns her books and leaves."

In 2007, elected and serving members of All India Majlis-e-Ittehadul Muslimeen made threats against Taslima Nasreen, pledging that the fatwa against her and Salman Rushdie were to be upheld. While she was in Hyderabad releasing Telugu translations of her work, she was attacked by party members led by three MLAs- Mohammed Muqtada Khan, Mohammed Moazzam Khan and Syed Ahmed Pasha Quadri - were then charged and arrested.

==== Expulsion from Kolkata ====
On 9 August 2007, Nasrin was in Hyderabad to present the Telugu translation of one of her novels, Shodh, when she was attacked by a mob led by legislators from the Majlis-e-Ittehadul Muslimeen, an Indian political party. A week later, on 17 August, Muslim leaders in Kolkata revived an old fatwa against her, urging her to leave the country and offering an unlimited amount of money to anyone who would kill her. On 21 November, Kolkata witnessed a protest against Nasrin. A protest organised by the "All India Minority Forum" caused chaos in the city and forced the army's deployment to restore order.

The government of India kept Nasrin in an undisclosed location in New Delhi, effectively under house arrest, for more than seven months. In January 2008, she was selected for the Simone de Beauvoir award in recognition of her writing on women's rights, but she declined to go to Paris to receive the award. She explained that "I don't want to leave India at this stage and would rather fight for my freedom here," but she had to be hospitalised for three days with several complaints. The house arrest quickly acquired an international dimension: in a letter to the London-based human rights organisation Amnesty International, India's former foreign secretary Muchkund Dubey urged the organisation to pressure the Indian government so that Nasrin could safely return to Kolkata.

From New Delhi, Nasrin commented: "I'm writing a lot, but not about Islam, It's not my subject now. This is about politics. In the last three months I have been put under severe pressure to leave [West] Bengal by the police." In an email interview from the undisclosed safehouse, Nasrin talked about the stress caused by "this unendurable loneliness, this uncertainty and this deathly silence." She cancelled the publication of the sixth part of her autobiography Nei Kichu Nei ("No Entity"), and — under pressure — deleted some passages from Dwikhandito, the controversial book that was the boost for the riots in Kolkata. She was forced to leave India on 19 March 2008.

Nasrin moved to Sweden in 2008 and later worked as a research scholar at New York University. Since, as she claims, "her soul lived in India," she also pledged her body to the country, by awarding it for posthumous medical use to Gana Darpan, a Kolkata-based NGO, in 2005. She eventually returned to India, but was forced to stay in New Delhi as the West Bengal government refused to permit her entry. Currently, her visa received a one-year extension in 2016 and Nasreen is also seeking permanent residency in India but no decision has been taken on it by the Home Ministry.

In 2015 Nasrin was threatened with death by Al Qaeda-linked extremists, and so the Center for Inquiry assisted her in travelling to the United States, where she now lives. The Center for Inquiry (CFI) that helped evacuate her to the US on 27 May gave an official statement in June 2015 stating that her safety "is only temporary if she cannot remain in the U.S., however, which is why CFI has established an emergency fund to help with food, housing, and the means for her to be safely settled".

== Literary works ==
Do you really think a God who created the universe, billions of galaxies, stars, billions of planets- would promise to reward some little things in a pale blue dot (i.e Earth) for repeatedly saying that he is the greatest and kindest and for fasting? Such a great creator can't be so narcissist!
-Taslima Nasrin

Nasrin started writing poetry when she was thirteen. While still at college in Mymensingh, she published and edited a literary magazine, SeNjuti ("Light in the dark"), from 1978 to 1983. She published her first collection of poems in 1986. Her second collection, Nirbashito Bahire Ontore ("Banished within and without") was published in 1989. She succeeded in attracting a wider readership when she started writing columns in late 1980s, and, in the early 1990s, she began writing novels, for which she has won significant acclaim. In all, she has written more than thirty books of poetry, essays, novels, short stories, and memoirs, and her books have been translated into 20 different languages.

Her own experience of sexual abuse during adolescence and her work as a gynaecologist influenced her a great deal in writing about the treatment of women in Islam and against religion in general. Her writing is characterised by two connected elements: her struggle with the religion of her native culture, and her feminist philosophy. She cites Virginia Woolf and Simone de Beauvoir as influences, and, when pushed to think of one closer to home, Begum Rokeya, who lived during the time of undivided Bengal. Her later poetry also evidences a connection to place, to Bangladesh and India.

=== Columns and essays ===
In 1989 Nasrin began to contribute to the weekly political magazine Khaborer Kagoj, edited by Nayeemul Islam Khan, and published from Dhaka. Her feminist views and anti-religion remarks articles succeeded in drawing broad attention, and she shocked the religious and conservative society of Bangladesh by her radical comments and suggestions. Later she collected these columns in a volume titled Nirbachita Column, which in 1992 won her first Ananda Purashkar award, a prestigious award for Bengali writers. During her life in Kolkata, she contributed a weekly essay to the Bengali version of The Statesman, called Dainik Statesman. Taslima has always advocated for an Indian Uniform civil code, and said that criticism of Islam is the only way to establish secularism in Islamic countries. Taslima said that Triple talaq is despicable and the All India Muslim Personal Law Board should be abolished. Taslima used to write articles for online media venture The Print in India.

=== Novels ===
In 1992 Nasrin produced two novellas which failed to draw attention.

Her breakthrough novel Lajja (Shame) was published in 1993, and attracted wide attention because of its controversial subject matter. It contained the struggle of a patriotic Bangladeshi Hindu family in a Muslim environment. Initially written as a thin documentary, Lajja grew into a full-length novel as the author later revised it substantially. In six months' time, it sold 50,000 copies in Bangladesh before being banned by the government that same year.

Her other famous novel is French Lover, published in year 2002.

=== Autobiography ===
Amar Meyebela (My Girlhood, 2002), the first volume of her memoir, was banned by the Bangladeshi government in 1999 for "reckless comments" against Islam and the prophet Mohammad. Utal Hawa (Wild Wind), the second part of her memoir, was banned by the Bangladesh government in 2002. Ka (Speak up), the third part of her memoir, was banned by the Bangladeshi High Court in 2003. Under pressure from Indian Muslim activists, the book, which was published in West Bengal as Dwikhandita, was banned there also; some 3,000 copies were seized immediately. The decision to ban the book was criticised by "a host of authors" in West Bengal, but the ban was not lifted until 2005. Sei Sob Ondhokar (Those Dark Days), the fourth part of her memoir, was banned by the Bangladesh government in 2004. To date, a total of seven parts of her autobiography have been published. "Ami bhalo nei tumi bhalo theko priyo desh", " Nei kichu nei" and "Nirbashito". All seven parts have been published by Peoples's Book Society, Kolkata. She received her second Ananda Purashkar award in 2000, for her memoir Amar Meyebela (My Girlhood, published in English in 2002).

== Nasrin's life and works in adaptation ==
Nasrin's life is the subject of a number of plays and songs, in the east and the west. The Swedish singer Magoria sang "Goddess in you, Taslima," and the French band Zebda composed "Don't worry, Taslima" as an homage.

Her work has been adapted for TV and even turned into music. Jhumur was a 2006 TV serial based on a story written especially for the show. Bengali singers like Fakir Alamgir, Samina Nabi, Rakhi Sen sang her songs. Steve Lacy, the jazz soprano saxophonist, met Nasrin in 1996 and collaborated with her on an adaptation of her poetry to music. The result, a "controversial" and "compelling" work called The Cry, was performed in Europe and North America. Initially, Nasrin was to recite during the performance, but these recitations were dropped after the 1996 Berlin world première because of security concerns.

== Controversy ==
=== Abrar Fahad ===
In 2019, she garnered criticism from all over Bangladesh following her comment on Abrar Fahad in a Facebook status where she claimed "Abrar Fahad behaved like a Shibir Member". Her critics included Asif Nazrul who called her a "mentally unstable person" for making such a comparison.

=== Burqa ===
When Sri Lanka banned the burqa in 2019, Nasrin took to Twitter to show her support for the decision. She described the burqa as a 'mobile prison,' a comment which was reported on by journalists.

In another 2020 tweet about A. R. Rahman's daughter Khatija Rahman wearing burqas Taslima said,

I absolutely love A. R. Rahman's music. But whenever i see his dear daughter, i feel suffocated. It is really depressing to learn that even educated women in a cultural family can get brainwashed very easily!

Khatija Rahman replied to this tweet in an Instagram post by saying,

I'm sorry you feel suffocated by my attire. Please get some fresh air, cause I don't feel suffocated rather I'm proud and empowered for what I stand for. I suggest you google up what true feminism means because it isn't bashing other women down nor bringing their fathers into the issue. I also don't recall sending my photos to you for your perusal.

=== Eugenics ===
In a 2019 tweet, she stated on Twitter that

Men and women who have bad genes with genetic diseases like diabetes, hypertension, cancer etc should not produce children. They have no right to make others suffer.

Some commentators cited this as support for eugenics. Nasrin has denied this, stating that she is not a supporter of eugenics, and that her comment was not serious, and had been taken out of context.

=== Suicide ===
In another 2019 tweet just days after V.G. Siddhartha's suicide, Taslima said,

So many painless ways to commit suicide. why hang yourself, drown yourself, or cut your wrist, why jump from the high rise building or the bridge, or swallow pesticide, or poison or why jump in front of an oncoming train? Take the lethal doses of morphine and die peacefully.

This was met with plenty of criticisms with critics calling the tweet irresponsible, insensitive and promotion of suicide. Responding to the criticisms she defended the tweet by saying,

I am not encouraging people to die. I am asking people who decided to commit suicide or who is determined to commit suicide, to get a peaceful way to do it. It is a positive tweet.

=== Moeen Ali ===
In a 2021 tweet about British cricketer Moeen Ali she said,

If Moeen Ali were not stuck with cricket, he would have gone to Syria to join ISIS.

She faced significant criticism because of this tweet including Moeen's teammates Jofra Archer, Sam Billings and Saqib Mahmood. Replying to Nasreen's original tweet, Archer wrote, "Are you okay? I don't think you're okay". Saqib Mahmood wrote, "Can't believe this. Disgusting tweet. Disgusting individual". She later justified her tweet with another tweet,

Haters know very well that my Moeen Ali tweet was sarcastic. But they made that an issue to humiliate me because I try to secularize Muslim society & I oppose Islamic fanaticism. One of the greatest tragedies of humankind is pro-women leftists support anti-women Islamists.

Archer also blasted Nasreen's attempt at damage control with her second tweet. "Sarcastic? No one is laughing, not even yourself, the least you can do is delete the tweet," Archer wrote. Moeen Ali's father Munir said,

If she looks into a mirror, she will know what she tweeted is what is fundamentalist – a vicious stereotype against a Muslim person, a clearly Islamophobic statement. Someone who doesn't have self-respect and respect for others can only stoop to this level.

She later deleted her original tweet.

=== Malala Yousafzai ===
In a 2021 tweet about Malala Yousafzai's marriage to Asser Malik, Taslima said,

Quite shocked to learn Malala married a Pakistani guy. She is only 24. I thought she went to Oxford University for study, she would fall in love with a handsome progressive English man at Oxford and then think of marrying not before the age of 30. But..

This tweet faced sharp criticisms with critics calling the tweet Islamophobic, colonialist and racist.

=== Boycott Islam ===
After a knife terror attack at a church in Nice in 2020, Taslima tweeted "Boycott Islam". This led to formal complaints against for spreading disharmony and communal hate in India. This included Rajya Sabha MP Saket Gokhale filing a complaint with the Home Ministry of India. He said in a tweet,

A Swedish national spreading communal hate speech in India will NOT be tolerated.

Taslima later deleted that tweet.

=== Mahfuj Alam ===
In 2024, Taslima faced significant backlash after asserting that Mahfuj Alam was the leader of Hizb-ut-Tahrir in a Facebook status despite not having any concrete evidence of it. This led to the Indian mainstream media picking up on it and publishing it as news without further fact checking. Her actions quickly sparked a wave of memes and trolling on social media, with many people questioning her motives and even speculating about her mental state.

== Writers and intellectuals for and against Nasrin ==
Nasrin has been criticised by writers and intellectuals in both Bangladesh and West Bengal for targeted scandalisation. Because of "obnoxious, false and ludicrous" comments in Ka, "written with the 'intention to injure the reputation of the plaintiff'", Syed Shamsul Haq, Bangladeshi poet and novelist, filed a defamation suit against Nasrin in 2003. In the book, she mentions that Haq confessed to her that he had a relationship with his sister-in-law. A West Bengali poet, Hasmat Jalal, did the same; his suit led to the High Court banning the book, which was published in India as Dwikhondito. Nearly 4 million dollars were claimed in defamation lawsuits against her after the book was published. The West Bengal Government, supposedly pressured by 24 literary intellectuals, decided to ban Nasrin's book in 2003. Some commented that she did it to earn fame. She defended herself against the allegations, responding that she had written her life's story, not those of others. She enjoyed support from Bengali writers Annada Shankar Ray, Sibnarayan Ray and Amlan Dutta.

Recently she was supported and defended by author Mahasweta Devi, poet Joy Goswami, and artist Paritosh Sen. In India, noted writers Arundhati Roy, Girish Karnad, and others defended her when she was under house arrest in Delhi in 2007, and co-signed a statement calling on the Indian government to grant her permanent residency in India or, should she ask for it, citizenship. In Bangladesh, writer and philosopher Kabir Chowdhury also supported her strongly.

== Other activities ==
- Reporters Without Borders (RWB), member of the Emeritus Board

== Awards ==
Taslima Nasrin has received international awards in recognition of her contribution towards the cause of freedom of expression. Awards and honours conferred on her include the following:

- Ananda Award or Ananda Puraskar from West Bengal, India in 1992 and 2000 for "Nirbachita Kolam" and "Amar Meyebela"
- Sakharov Prize for freedom of thoughts from European Parliament, in 1994
- Simone de Beauvoir Prize in 2008
- Human Rights Award from the Government of France, 1994
- Edict of Nantes Prize from France, 1994
- Kurt Tucholsky Prize, Swedish PEN, Sweden, 1994
- Feminist of the Year from Feminist Majority Foundation, US, 1994
- Scholarship from the German Academic Exchange Service, Germany, 1995
- Honorary Doctorate from Ghent University, Belgium, 1995 Overzicht eredoctoraten
- Distinguished Humanist Award from International Humanist and Ethical Union, Great Britain, 1996
- Erwin Fischer Award, International League of non-religious and atheists (IBKA), Germany, 2002
- Freethought Heroine Award, Freedom From Religion Foundation, US, 2002
- Fellowship at Carr Centre for Human Rights Policy, John F. Kennedy School of Government, Harvard University, US, 2003
- UNESCO-Madanjeet Singh Prize for the promotion of tolerance and non-violence, 2004
- Honorary doctorate from American University of Paris, 2005
- Grand Prix International Condorcet-Aron, 2005
- Woodrow Wilson Fellowship, US, 2009
- Feminist Press award, US, 2009
- Honorary doctorate from Universite Catholique de Louvain, Belgium, 2011
- Honorary citizenship from Esch, Luxembourg, 2011
- Honorary citizenship from Metz, France, 2011
- Honorary citizenship from Thionville, France, 2011
- Honorary doctorate from Paris Diderot University, Paris, France, 2011
- Universal Citizenship Passport. From Paris, France, 2013
- Academy Award from the Royal Academy of Arts, Science and Literature, Belgium, 2013
- Honorary Associate of the National Secular Society
- Lifetime Achievement Award 2025 from esSENSE Global, at the Litmus '25 annual conference, Kochi, Kerala, India, 2025

== Bibliography ==
https://www.britannica.com/biography/Taslima-Nasrin [references: https://www.britannica.com/biography/Taslima-Nasrin/additional-info#history ]

=== Poetry ===
- Shikore Bipul Khudha (Hunger in the Roots), 1982
- Nirbashito Bahire Ontore (Banished Without and Within), 1989
- Amar Kichu Jay Ashe Ne (I Couldn't Care Less), 1990
- Atole Ontorin (Captive in the Abyss), 1991
- Balikar Gollachut (Game of the Girls), 1992
- Behula Eka Bhashiyechilo Bhela (Behula Floated the Raft Alone), 1993
- Ay Kosto Jhepe, Jibon Debo Mepe (Pain Come Roaring Down, I'll Measure Out My Life for You), 1994
- Nirbashito Narir Kobita (Poems From Exile), 1996
- Jolpodyo (Waterlilies), 2000
- Khali Khali Lage (Feeling Empty), 2004
- Kicchukhan Thako (Stay for a While), 2005
- Bhalobaso? Cchai baso (It's your love! or a heap of trash!), 2007
- Bondini (Prisoner), 2008
- Golpo (stories), 2018

=== Essay collections ===
- Nirbachito Column (Selected Columns), 1990
- Jabo na keno? jabo (I will go; why won't I?), 1991
- Noshto meyer noshto goddo (Fallen prose of a fallen girl), 1992
- ChoTo choTo dukkho kotha (Tale of trivial sorrows), 1994
- Narir Kono Desh Nei (Women have no country), 2007
- Nishiddho (Forbidden), 2014
- Taslima Nasreener Godyo Podyo (Taslima Nasreen's prose and poetry), 2015
- Amar protibader bhasha (Language of my protest), 2016
- Sakal Griho Haralo Jar (A poet who lost everything), 2017
- Bhabnaguli (My thoughts), 2018
- Bhinnomot (Different opinions), 2019

=== Novels ===
- Oporpokkho (The Opponent), 1992.
- Shodh, 1992. ISBN 978-81-88575-05-3. Trans. in English as Getting Even.
- Nimontron (Invitation), 1993.
- Phera (Return), 1993.
- Lajja, 1993. ISBN 978-0-14-024051-1. Trans. in English as Shame.
- Bhromor Koio Gia (Tell Him The Secret), 1994.
- Forashi Premik (French Lover), 2002.
- Brahmaputrer pare (At the bank of Brahmaputra river), 2013
- Beshorom (Shameless), 2019

=== Short stories ===
- Dukkhoboty Meye (Sad girls), 1994
- Minu, 2007

=== Autobiography ===
- Amar Meyebela (My girlhood), 1997
- Utal Hawa (Wild Wind), 2002
- Ka (Speak Up), 2003; published in West Bengal as Dwikhandito (Split-up in Two), 2003
- Sei Sob Andhokar (Those Dark Days), 2004
- Ami Bhalo Nei, Tumi Bhalo Theko Priyo Desh ("I am not okay, but you stay well my beloved homeland"), 2006.
- Nei, Kichu Nei (Nothing is there), 2010
- Nirbasan (Exile), 2012

== Academic contribution ==
=== Titles in English ===
- Split ISBN 978-0-670-09018-1
- Exile ISBN 978-0-670-08874-4
- French Lover ISBN 978-0-14-302810-9
- Nasrin, Taslima (2005). All About Women. New Delhi: Rupa & Co. ISBN 978-81-291-0630-8.
- Nasrin, Taslima (c. 1995). The Game in Reverse: Poems. Carolyne Wright (trans.). New York: George Braziller. ISBN 978-0-8076-1391-7.
- Nasrin, Taslima (1994). Shame. New Delhi: Penguin India. ISBN 978-0-14-024051-1. Trans. of Lajja.
- Nasrin, Taslima (c. 2005). Love poems of Taslima Nasreen. New Delhi: Rupa & Co. ISBN 978-81-291-0628-5.
- Nasrin, Taslima (2002). My Bengali Girlhood. Gopa Majumdar (trans.). South Royalton: Steerforth Press. ISBN 978-1-58642-051-2. Trans. of Meyebela

=== Secondary works ===
- Garzilli, Enrica (1997). "A Non-Conventional Woman: Two Evenings with Taslima Nasrin. A Report". Journal of South Asia Women Studies. 3 (1). Milan: Asiatica Association. ISSN 1085-7478.
- Zafar, Manmay (2005). "Under the gaze of the state: policing literature and the case of Taslima Nasrin". Inter-Asia Cultural Studies. 6 (3): 410–21. doi:10.1080/14649370500170035. ISSN 1469-8447. S2CID 144386024.
- Hasan, Md. Mahmudul (December 2010). "Free speech, ban and "fatwa": A study of the Taslima Nasrin affair". Journal of Postcolonial Writing. 46 (5): 540–552. doi:10.1080/17449855.2010.517061. S2CID 28109396.
- Hasan, Md. Mahmudul (July 2016), "Nasrin Gone Global: A Critique of Taslima Nasrin's Criticism of Islam and Her Feminist Strategy." South Asia Research. 36(2): 167–185. Nasrin Gone Global: A Critique of Taslima Nasrin's Criticism of Islam and Her Feminist Strategy

== See also ==
- List of fatwas
- List of former Muslims
- Women in muslim societies
- The Cry (Steve Lacy album)
