= Barun Sengupta =

Indian writer (1934–2008)

Barun Sengupta বরুণ সেনগুপ্ত
- Born: 23 January 1934; Barisal, Bengal Presidency, British India
- Died: 19 June 2008 (aged 74); Kolkata, West Bengal, India
- Occupations: Journalist, founder-editor of Bartaman

Barun Sengupta (Bengali: বরুণ সেনগুপ্ত) (23 January 1934 – 19 June 2008), the founder-editor of Bartaman newspaper, was a Bengali journalist and popular political critic. He is remembered for his bold and simple diction of political analysing that made him extremely well liked among the common readers in West Bengal.

== Life ==
Son of Nirmalananda Sengupta and Ranibala Devi, Barun Sengupta was born in Barisal (in present-day Bangladesh). Sengupta, along with his family, moved to Kolkata before the partition of India in 1947 and rented a house near Baithakkhana Market in north-central Kolkata.

His education started in B.M. School, Barisal. Later he was admitted to Town School, Kolkata. After graduating in commerce from City College, Kolkata, he founded a periodical named Bhabikal which lasted a few issues. In 1957, he founded another weekly named Bartaman with the aid of Hemanta Kumar Bose, a popular leader of the political party, Forward Bloc. He joined Anandabazar Patrika in 1960 and became its first designated political correspondent in 1965. During the Emergency, he was sent to jail along with another reporter, Gour Kishore Ghosh.

In 1984, he left Anandabazar Patrika to start his own journal and launched Bartaman, a daily, on 7 December that year. For its straightforward and intrepid style, the journal became extremely popular among the common Bengali readers. Later Sengupta launched two more periodicals – Saptahik Bartaman, a weekly and Sukhi Grihokon, a monthly and this time too it was a success. He died in a south Kolkata nursing home after a brief illness, having completed 50 years in journalism the previous year.

== Books ==
He wrote several books on India's political situation. One of his controversial book Indira Ekadashi was based on the 11-year tenure (1966–77) of Indira Gandhi as the Prime Minister of India.

- Pala Badaler Pala
- Sab Charitra Kalpanik
- Bipak-i-stan
- Andhakarer Antaraley
- Netajir Antardhan Rahasya

== Remembrance ==
A metro station was named after him as Barun Sengupta Metro Station in the Orange Line of Kolkata Metro. The station is meant to serve the Science City and surrounding area of Eastern Kolkata.
