= Jayanta Dey =

Indian author

Jayanta Dey জয়ন্ত দে
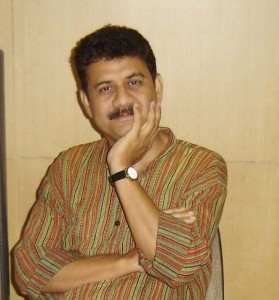
- Photo of Jayanta Dey
- Born: 29 February 1964 (age 61); Kurchibaria, Howrah, India
- Citizenship: Indian
- Occupation: Editor
- Spouse: Chumki Dey
- Children: Ahitagni Dey
- Awards: Somenchanda Smriti Puroskar 2006 Golpomala Puroskar 2009; Namita Chattopadhyay Sahitya Puroskar 2013; Sopan Puroskar 2013 Bankim Puroskar 2023

Jayanta Dey (Bengali: জয়ন্ত দে; born 29 February 1964)is a novelist and short story writer in Bengali living in Kolkata, West Bengal, India. He is also the editor of Saptahik Bartaman Magazine and works at daily Bartaman Patrika. He has received awards like Somenchanda Smriti Puroskar, Golpomala Puroskar, Namita Chattopadhyay Sahitya Puroskar.

== Early writing ==
Jayanta Dey started writing poetry and was involved in publishing little magazine Amuk. He shifted to writing short stories after the 92-93 riots in India following the Demolition of the Babri Masjid when he felt that he can't communicate himself in poetry. His short story Pendulum, using the symbolism of an antique clock to establish the communal hatred in urban Indian psyche was published in Teebro Kuthar magazine. The short story received wide acclaim and received attention from eminent Bengali novelist Debesh Ray. Jayanta Dey's short stories started to feature in several reputed Bengali literary magazines like Desh and Pratikhon.

== Style ==
Jayanta Dey is a powerful writer. Noted critic Nityapriya Ghosh argues that his style is flawless. His novels deals a wide range of ideas dealing with transgender people, ragging, power and corruption, Kumbha Mela etc. He abhors violence and wants to supplement issues of revenge with fantasy and magic.

== Works ==
=== Short story collections ===
Name	Publisher	ISBN
Jayanta Dey'er Galpo	Pratikhon Publications	
Nirbachito Galpo	Koruna Prokashani	
Amra O Aro Koekjon	Mitra & Ghosh Publishers	ISBN 978-81-7293-944-1
Sera Ponchasti Golpo	Dey's Publishing	ISBN 978-81-295-1424-0

=== Novels ===
Name	Publisher	ISBN
Alor Ayojon	Koruna Prokashani	
Ruptan	Koruna Prokashani	
Ghaiharini	Koruna Prokashani	ISBN 81-8437-083-0
Bhoy! Bhoy!	Mitra & Ghosh Publishers	ISBN 978-81-7293-981-6
Purnokumbhe Kolpobash	Mitra & Ghosh Publishers	ISBN 978-93-5020-012-4
Jago Ratri	Dey's Publishing	ISBN 978-81-295-0998-7
Paymonti	Parampara	ISBN 978-93-80869-79-7
Parir Dekhano Alo	Dey's Publishing	ISBN 978-81-295-1968-9
Mrito na Jibito	Patrabharati	ISBN 978-81-8374-283-2
Aatmajan	Dey's Publishing	ISBN 978-81-295-2361-7
Anti Hero	Patrabharati	ISBN 978-81-8374-343-3
Nishikantor Khoka Bhut	Parashpathar Prakashan	ISBN 978-93-82046-34-9
Kankal Hāta'er Bala	Koruna Prokashani	ISBN 978-81-8437-234-2
