= Nirbachito Column =

Book by Taslima Nasreen

- Author: Taslima Nasrin
- Original title: নির্বাচিত কলাম
- Translator: Debjani Sengupta
- Language: Bengali
- Genre: Non-fiction
- Publisher: Mujibur Rahman Khoka
- Publication date: 1992

Nirbachito Column (Bengali: নির্বাচিত কলাম) or (Selected Columns) is a feminist work in Bengali literature. It was published in 1992 and is a collection of essays by exiled Bengali author Taslima Nasrin which were previously published in the newspaper Ajker Kagoj. The author was awarded the Ananda Purashkar, a major Bengali literary award, for the book.

== Synopsis ==
The book starts by describing her experience of being tortured by a boy when she was eighteen or nineteen. The boy pressed a half-smoked burning cigarette on her hand and laughed and went away. The column ends with mentioning that once in her city, there were some signboards which mentioned "seek help of cops if ever teasers disturb you". The column says, "it did not work out. Probably the teasers eradicated those signboards along with the stamps. As long as those signboards existed, teasers used to stand leaning on the wooden posts of those and whistle at girls. And the most ironic thing is, once, girls had to seek help of those teasers to protect themselves from the teasing of cops."

A reading from the book by the author herself, and a recitation of her one romantic poem by Bratati Bannerjee.
1 minute and 55 seconds (of 1:55)

The book criticizes Islam, Hinduism, and religions in general as man made tools to oppress women. The book inspired so many women, while angered so many fundamentalists, at the same time. This is the first Bengali book ever where a woman talks about sex without any hesitation. Sex discussion is still a taboo in Bangladesh. Columns that are presented in this book were written between 1989-1990. These columns revived the feminist struggle in Bangladesh after almost one century of Roquia Sakhawat Hussain.

== Publication ==
In 1989 Taslima Nasrin was invited by then editor Naimul Islam Khan (later her husband) to write columns for the popular newspaper Ajker Kagoj. Taslima Nasrin replied, "Sorry, I don't know how to write a column." Khan replied, "Don't worry. Write anything that comes to your mind."

While Taslima Nasrin was thinking about a subject to write about, her gaze fell on her right hand. She noticed a scar and remembered about the boy who pressed the cigarette on her hand, that left the black mark there. Then she took the pen and wrote about the event. She was still uncertain about whether the essay was really acceptable, but she submitted it, mentioning "I don't know the method of writing column. I just wrote about an experience of my own life."

She was unsure about whether the column would really be published or not. To her surprise, when the column came out in the newspaper, it grabbed the attention of many readers, and then she was invited to write columns regularly. Sales of the newspaper rose whenever she wrote an article.

In 1991, publisher Mujibur Rahman Khoka, who was a friend of Taslima Nasrin, offered to publish a book on her columns, which she agreed to. After publication, the book became a best seller and was also popular in West Bengal. The book became controversial and helped spread Nasrin's name

== Controversy ==
When the book was declared for Ananda Award, Nasrin informed the award committee that the book contains a column where she copied a write-up of Sukumari Bhattacharya on Vedas. But the committee did not take it as a big deal, probably because she herself confessed about it. There is some controversy about the book. The book was criticized by Muslims and traditionalists. They declare that she presented Islam negatively, without understanding Quran and Hadith properly.

== Awards ==
Taslima Nasrin got Ananda Purashkar for the book back in 1992.

== Translations ==
Debjani Sengupta has translated the book into English. It has also been translated in Hindi, Assamese, Marathi and many other languages.
