= Bankim Puraskar =

Award for Bengali literature, given by the Government of West Bengal

Bankim Puraskar (Bengali: বঙ্কিম পুরস্কার, Bankim Memorial Award) is the highest award given by the Government of West Bengal for contribution to Bengali fiction. The award was instituted in 1975 in memory of Bankim Chandra Chattopadhyay, a famous Bengali novelist of the 19th century. It has been brought under the aegis of Paschimbanga Bangla Akademi, functioning under the Department of Information & Cultural Affairs, in 2003. The award is handed over by the Chief Minister of West Bengal.

== Awardees ==
- 1975 – Prabodh Chandra Sen
- 1982 – Gour Kishore Ghosh
- 1983 – Sunil Gangopadhyay – Sei Samay (novel, 2 volumes)
- 1984 – Sushil Jana
- 1985 – Prafulla Roy – Akasher Neeche Manush (novel)
- 1986 – Amiya Bhushan Majumdar – Rajnagar (novel)
- 1987 – Amalendu Chakraborty – Jabajjiban (novel)
- 1988 – Sachindranath Bandyopadhyay
- 1990 – Dibyendu Palit
- 1991 – Kamal Kumar Majumdar – Galpasamagra (complete stories) (posthumous)
- 1992 – Abhijit Sen – Rahu Chandaler Harh (novel)
- 1993 – Shankar (Mani Shankar Mukhopadhyay) – Gharer Madhye Ghar
- 1994 – Syed Mustafa Siraj – Aleek Manush (novel)
- 1995 – Manjush Dasgupta, Sandipan Chattopadhyay
- 1996 – Nabarun Bhattacharya – Harbart (novel) (award returned in 2007 in protest against the Nandigram violence)
- 1998 – Atin Bandyopadhyay – Dui Bharatbarsha (novel)
- ... ... . – Bani Basu
- 2000 – Narayan Sanyal – Rupamanjari (3 volumes) (historical novel)
- 2001 – Samir Rakshit Dukher Akhyan (novel),
- 2001 – Amar Mitra – Ashwacharit (novel)
- 2002 – Chitta Ghoshal – Nirbachita Galpo volume 2 (selected stories)
- 2002 . – Tapan Bandyopadhyay – Nadi, Mati, Aranya (3 volumes)
- 2004 – Bhagirath Mishra – Mrigaya
- 2005 – Sadhan Chattopadhyay
- ... ... . – Nabendu Ghosh – Chand Dekhechhilo (novel)
- ... ... . – Swapnamoy Chakraborty – Abantinagar (novel)
- 2006 – Ramkumar Mukhopadhyay
- 2007 – Jhareswar Chattopadhyay – Sohish
- 2008 – Kinnar Roy – Mrittukushum, Nalini Bera
- 2010 – Afsar Ahmed – Hire Bhikharini O Sundori Ramoni Kissa
- 2010 – Anil Ghorai – Ananta Draghima (Study on the use of colors in the works and paintings of Rabindranath Tagore)
- 2011 – Rabisankar Bal – Dozakhnama (novel)
- 2012 – Kamal Chakraborty
- 2014 – Ramanath Roy
- 2015 – Gautam Basu – Bengali Poetry
- 2016 – Abul Bashar
- 2017 – Balaram Basak
- 2018 – Subrata Sengupta
- 2022 – Harsha Dutta for Bengali Prose Fiction Literature
- 2023 – Jayanta Dey Annapurna (novel)
- 2025 – Sanmatrananda

== See also ==
- Rabindra Puraskar
- Ananda Puraskar
- List of Sahitya Akademi Award winners for Bengali
- Bangla Academy Award
