= Amalendu Chakraborty =

Indian writer (1934–2009)

- Born: 7 December 1934; Baghai village, Dhaka, Bengal Presidency, British Raj
- Died: 15 June 2000 (aged 65); Baguiati, Kolkata, West Bengal, India
- Education: Central Calcutta College, Calcutta University
- Occupations: Novelist; short story writer
- Spouse: Gita Chakraborty
- Children: 1
- Writing career
- Years active: 1948-2009
- Notable awards: Bankim Puraskar (1987)

Amalendu Chakraborty (7 December 1934 ― 15 June 2009) was an Indian Bengali writer and novelist in the late 20th Century.

== Early life and education ==
Amalendu Chakraborty was born in the village of Baghai in Dhaka district in British India. In his childhood, he was forced to move to his maternal home in Kolkata with the uprooted people before independence. The renowned poet Sanjay Bhattacharya was his maternal uncle. He studied at Bowbazar High School. He then graduated from Central Calcutta College and received a master's degree in Bengali language and literature from the University of Calcutta.

== Film adaptation ==
Renowned film director Mrinal Sen made the famous film Ek Din Pratidin based on Amalendu Chakraborty's short story "Abirat Chenamukh". The film was released in 1979 and screened at the Cannes Film Festival. The highly acclaimed film won many National Awards. After that, Mrinal Sen also made a film based on the novel Akaler Sandhane, written in the backdrop of the 1943 Bengal famine, and the film was released in 1980. The film was awarded the Silver Bear award at the Berlin Film Festival in 1981. In 1987, he received Bankim Puraskar by the government of West Bengal.

== Death ==
He died on 15 June 2009 at age 74 in his Baguiati residence.

== See also ==
- Charu Chandra Chakraborty
