= Rabisankar Bal =

Indian writer (1962–2017)

- Born: 8 May 1962; Calcutta, West Bengal, india
- Died: 12 December 2017 (aged 54–55); Kolkata, West Bengal, India
- Citizenship: India
- Occupations: Writer, journalist
- Known for: Novelist, short story writer, journalist
- Notable work: Dōjakhanāmā, Āẏanājībana
- Children: 2
- Awards: Bankim Puraskar (2011)

Rabisankar Bal (1962–2017) was an Indian writer and journalist.

== Career ==
Over his career, he published more than twenty works, including novels, short stories, poetry, and essays. His notable works include Dozakhnama (Conversations in Hell) and Aynajibon (A Mirrored Life), both translated into English by Arunava Sinha. Bal is recognised as an important figure in contemporary Bengali literature. He received several literary awards in recognition of his contributions.

During his career, Bal authored 15 novels and edited five collections of short stories. He also translated works of Saadat Hasan Manto into Bengali. His novel The Biography of Midnight earned him the Sutapa Roy Chowdhury Memorial Prize from the Government of West Bengal. Rabisankar Bal died at the age of 55 after a brief illness at B. R. Singh Hospital in Kolkata.

== Works ==
=== Collection of Stories (গল্পগ্রন্থ) ===
1. দারুনিরঞ্জন
2. রবিশঙ্কর বল এর গল্প
3. আর্তোর শেষ অভিনয়
4. জীবন অন্যত্র
5. ওই মণিময় তার কাহিনী
6. সেরা ৫০ টি গল্প

=== Novels (উপন্যাস) ===
1. নীল দরজা লাল ঘর
2. পোখরান ৯৮
3. পাণ্ডুলিপি করে আয়োজন
4. বাসস্টপে একদিন
5. মিলনের শ্বাসরোধী কথা
6. নষ্টভ্রষ্ট
7. এখানে তুষার ঝরে
8. দোজখনামা
9. আয়নাজীবন
10. আঙুরবাগানে খুন
11. জিরো আওয়ার
12. মধ্যরাত্রির জীবনী

=== Collection of Poems (কবিতা) ===
1. হেমন্তের এলিজি
2. ত্রস্ত নীলিমা
3. ঊনপঞ্চাশ বায়ু

=== Non Fiction (প্রবন্ধ) ===
1. সংলাপের মধ্যবর্তী এই নীরবতা
2. কুষ্ঠরোগীদের গুহায় সংগীত
3. মুখ আর মুখোশ
4. জীবনানন্দ ও অন্যান্য

=== Edited and Translated Books (সম্পাদিত গ্রন্থ) ===
1. সাদাত হোসেইন মন্টো রচনাসংগ্রহ
