= Parimal Bhattacharya =

Bengali novelist

- পরিমল ভট্টাচার্য
- Born: 1964 (age 61–62); Bhatpara, North 24 Parganas district, West Bengal, India
- Citizenship: India
- Education: Calcutta University
- Occupations: Writer, Academic
- Notable work: No Path in Darjeeling Is Straight; Satgaon-er Hawa Tantira
- Awards: Ananda Puraskar (2026)
- Website: https://parimalbhattacharya.in/

Parimal Bhattacharya (born 1964) is an Indian bilingual writer, essayist and academic from West Bengal. In 2026, he was awarded Ananda Puraskar for his novel Satgaon-er Hawa Tantira.

== Early life ==
Bhattacharya was born and raised in Bhatpara in North 24 Parganas district. He completed his postgraduate studies from Calcutta University and served as an associate professor of English under the West Bengal Education Service. Bhattacharya joined in service in 1994 and worked in various Government Colleges of West Bengal. He took voluntary retirement to focus on his literary works in 2025. His writings were also published in several leading journals. He has authored and edited over 15 books.

== Literary works ==
- No Path in Darjeeling Is Straight
- Bells of Shangri-La
- Danchinama
- Nahumer Gram O Onyanyo Museum
- Dodo Pakhider Gaan
- Apur Desh
- Field Notes from a Waterborne Land
- Satyi Rupkatha
- Jantranar Uttaradhikar
- Tarkovskyr Ghorbari
- Bergman, Apni
- Satgaon-er Hawa Tantira
