= Swapnamoy Chakraborty =

Bengali writer

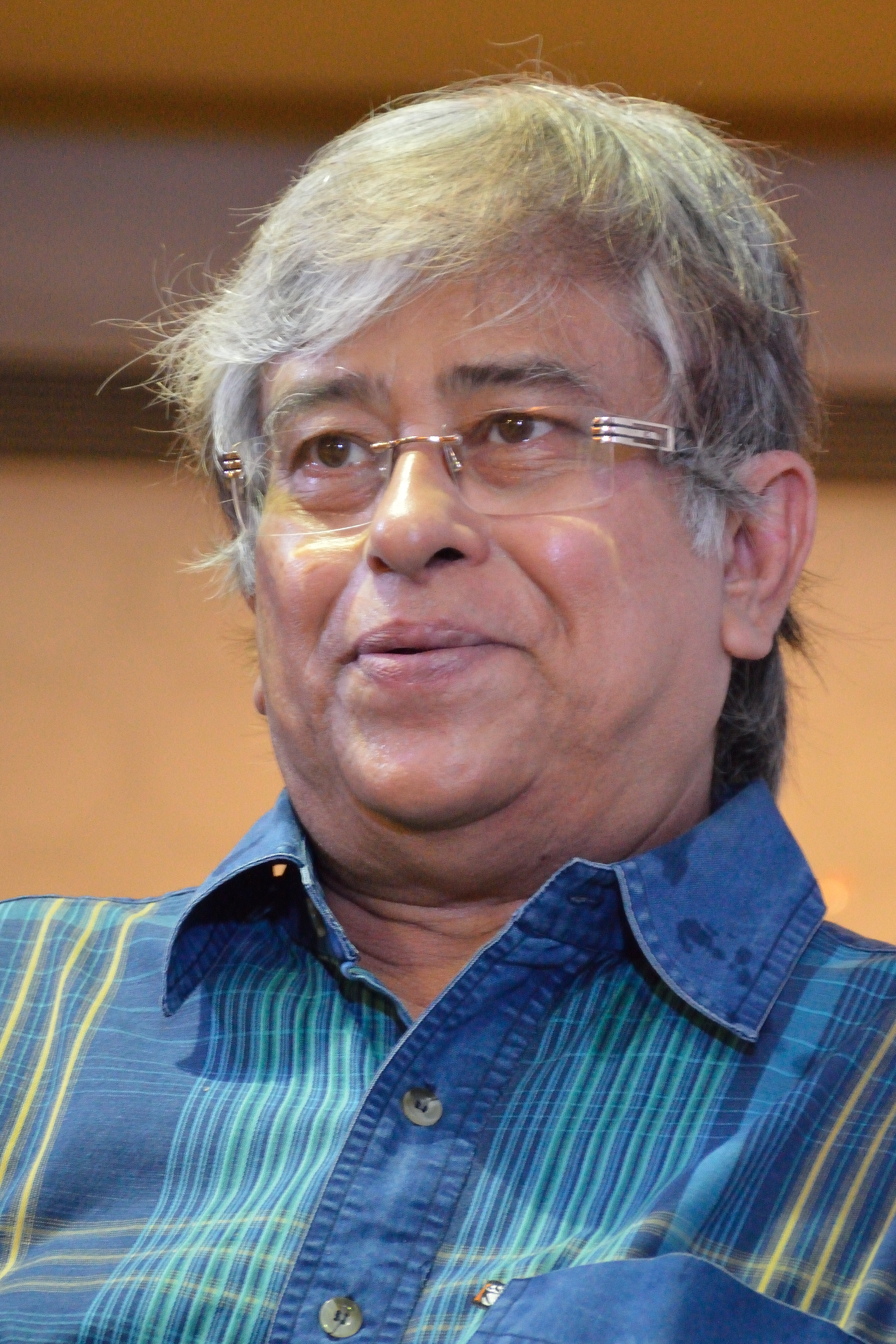
Swapnamoy Chakraborty

Swapnamoy Chakraborty (born 24 August 1951) is an Indian novelist and essayist, from West Bengal.

== Career ==
Chakraborty was born in Kolkata. He worked in the Land Department under the Government of West Bengal and Akashvani Kolkata as an executive director. He started his writing career with short stories. His first short story was published in 1972 in Amrita magazine. Chakraborty's first book Bhumi Sutra was published in 1982. His book Abantinagar won the Bankim Puraskar in 2005.

He received Ananda Puraskar in 2012 for Holde Golap, a research based novel on LGBT communities. In February 2019, Chakraborty alleged that Kaushik Ganguly’s film Nagarkirtan was plagiarised from his novel titled Holde Golap but later he revised his views on the film.

== Works ==
Books: Chatuspathi, Abantinagar, Holde Golap, Joler upor pani

== Awards ==
- Bankim Puraskar (2005)
- Ananda Puraskar (2015)
- Sahitya Akademi Award (2023)
