= Ananda Puraskar =

Award for Bengali literature awarded annually by the ABP Group to writers

The Ananda Puraskar (lit. 'Ananda Award') is an award for Bengali literature awarded annually by the ABP Group to writers using Bengali, usually from West Bengal, India.

== History ==
The award can be traced to a comment by Annada Shankar Ray ruing the absence of literary awards in Bengal. It was started on 20 April 1958 and has been given in the same month since. Initially, there were two awards, in memory of Prafulla Kumar Sarkar and Suresh Chandra Majumdar, the founders of Anandabazar Patrika. Another award was started in 1984 in memory of Ashok Kumar Sarkar to commemorate the golden jubilee of Desh. All three awards were merged in 2000.

== Awardees ==
- 1958 – Bibhutibhushan Mukhopadhyay (Prafulla Kumar Sarkar Memorial)
- .......Samaresh Basu (Suresh Chandra Majumdar Memorial)
- 1960 – Pramathanath Bishi – Kerry Saheber Munshi (novel) (Prafulla Kumar Sarkar Memorial)
- 1961 – Syed Mujtaba Ali
- 1963 - Kalidas Roy
- 1964 - Narayan Gangopadhyay
- 1966 – Sukumar Sen
- 1967 – Bimal Kar
- 1968 – Gopal Chandra Bhattacharya
- 1970 – Gour Kishore Ghosh
- 1971 – Satyajit Ray, Santosh Kumar Ghosh
- 1972 – Sunil Gangopadhyay – for general work
- 1973 – Shirshendu Mukhopadhyay – Manabjomin (novel)
- 1974 – Moti Nandy
- 1975 – Shakti Chattopadhyay
- 1976 – Buddhadeb Guha – Halud Basanta (novel)
- 1978 – Nikhil Sarkar
- 1979 – Syed Mustafa Siraj
- 1980 – Probodh Kumar Sanyal
- 1981 – Sanjib Chattopadhyay
- 1982 – Samaresh Majumdar
- 1983 – Annada Shankar Ray
- 1984 – Subhas Bhattacharya – Adhunik Bangla Prayog Abhidhan (A Dictionary of Modern Bengali Usage),
- .......Dibyendu Palit – Sahajoddha (novel),
- .......Sukumar Sen, Sagarmoy Ghosh, Bimal Mitra (Ashok Kumar Sarkar Memorial)
- 1985 – Alokranjan Dasgupta
- 1986 – Ketaki Kushari Dyson – Rabindranath o Victoria Ocampor Sandhane (historical novel) (Prafulla Kumar Sarkar Memorial)
- 1987 - Amalesh Tripathi - Itihas o Oitihashik
- 1988 – Abul Bashar
- 1989 – Sunil Gangopadhyay – Purbo-Paschim (novel)
- .......Amitav Ghosh – The Shadow Lines (novel)
- .......Nirad C. Chaudhuri – Thy Hand, Great Anarch! (autobiography)
- 1990 – Shirshendu Mukhopadhyay – Doorbeen (novel)
- .......Jay Goswami – Ghumiechho, Jhaupata? (poetry)
- 1991 – Subhash Mukhopadhyay, Jaya Mitra
- 1992 – Taslima Nasrin – Nirbachito Column (articles)
- 1993 – Bangla Academy (refused)
- .......Clinton B. Seely (Ashok Kumar Sarkar memorial)
- 1994 – Annada Shankar Ray,
- .......Shamsur Rahman,
- .......Anisuzzaman (Ashok Kumar Sarkar Memorial),
- .......Naren Biswas – Aitihyer Angikar (Audio cassettes, 13 Nos.)
- 1995 – Dr. Nazrul Islam – Bakul (novel),
- .......Debarati Mitra - Bhutera O Khuki
- 1996 – Akhtaruzzaman Elias – Khwabnama (novel)
- 1997 – Bani Basu – Maitreya Jatak (novel) (Prafulla Kumar Sarkar Memorial)
- ........Ketaki Kushari Dyson & Sushobhan Adhikari – Ranger Rabindranath (on Tagore's colour vision) (Suresh Chandra Majumdar Memorial)
- 1998 – Jay Goswami – Jara Brishtite Bhijechhilo (novel in verse)
- 1999 – Mandakranta Sen – Hriday Abadhya Meye (poetry)
- 2000 – Taslima Nasrin – Amar Meyebela (memoirs)
- 2001 – Gauriprasad Ghosh – Everyman's Dictionary
- 2002 – Sudhir Chakraborty – Baul Fakir Katha (folk culture)
- 2003 – Tilottama Majumdar – Basudhara (novel)
- 2004 – Srijato – Uranto Sab Joker (poetry)
- 2005 – Mihir Sengupta – Bishad Briksha (autobiography)
- 2006 – Utpal Kumar Basu – Sukh-Duhkher Sathi (poetry)
- 2007 – Dhritikanta Lahiri Choudhury – Hatir Boi (on elephants)
- 2008 – Hasan Azizul Huq – Agunpakhi (novel)
- 2009 – Ranajit Guha – Kabir Naam O Sarbanaam
- 2010 – Sunanda Sikdar – Dayamayir Katha
- 2011 – Gautam Bhadra – Nyara Bot-tolaye Jai Ko-bar?
- 2012 – Pinaki Thakur – Chumbaner Kshata (poetry)
- 2013 – Ramkumar Mukhopadhyay – Dhanapatir Singhalyatra (novel)
- 2014 – Arindam Chakrabarti – Bhaatkaporer Bhabna Ebong Koyekti Aatpoure Darshanik Prayas (philosophy)
- 2015 – Swapnamoy Chakraborty – Holde Golap
- 2016 – Sudhir Dutta – Tabu Moi o Srestho Kobitaguccho
- 2017 – Anisuzzaman – Bipula Prithibi (The Vast World)
- 2018 – Santosh Rana – Rajniti Ek Jibon
- 2019 – Nalini Bera – Subarnarenu Subarnarekha
- 2023 – Dr. Purnendu Bikas Sarkar – Gitabitan Tathyobhandar
- 2025 – Smaranjit Chakraborty
- 2026 – Parimal Bhattacharya – Satgaonr Haoatantira

== See also ==
- Rabindra Puraskar
- Bankim Puraskar
- Sahitya Akademi Award to Bengali Writers
- Bangla Academy Award
