= Amar Mitra (writer) =

Bengali writer (born 1951)

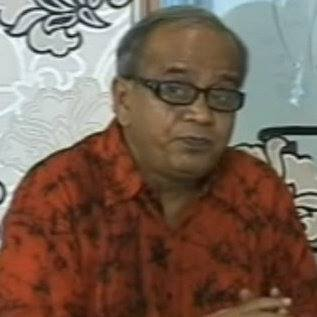
- Mitra in September 2014
- Born: 30 August 1951 (age 74); Basirhat, North 24 Parganas, West Bengal
- Occupations: Civil service, Bengali writer
- Spouse: Mitali Mitra
- Family: Manoj Mitra (brother)
- Awards: O. Henry Award (2022); Sahitya Akademi (2006); Bankim Puraskar (2001); Kotha Award for Short Story (1998); Sarat Purashkar (2002); Gajendra Kumar and Sumitnath Award (2010)

Amar Mitra (born 30 August 1951) is an eminent writer in Bengali living in Kolkata, West Bengal. His elder brother is notable actor Manoj Mitra.

== Early life ==
After partition of India in 1947, the Mitra family migrated from Satkhira in Khulna and came to Basirhat. His father, Ashok Kumar Mitra, was a government worker and opted to live in India after partition. He was born in the year 1951 in Basirhat. He was a student of chemistry. His father used to work in the Department of Land Reforms under Government of West Bengal.

== Literary career ==
Mitra is a veteran Bengali novelist and short story writer. He also edited number of books. He is writing for over five decades which includes 30 published novels, number of short-story collections as well as few books for children. Mitra participated in the First forum of Asian Countries' writers held in Nur Sultan city in Kazakhstan in September 2019 and awarded O. Henry Award for his short story, The Old man of Kusumpur. He was awarded with Sahitya Akademi Award for his novel Dhrubaputra (Bengali: ধ্রুবপুত্র) in 2006. He has also received the Bankim Puraskar from Government of West Bengal for his novel, Aswacharit (Bengali: অশ্বচরিত) in 2001, Mitra received Mitra O Ghosh award in the year 2010, Sharat Puroskar in the year 2018.
