= Mandakranta Sen =

Indian Bengali poet

- Born: 15 September 1972 (age 53); Calcutta, West Bengal
- Education: Higher secondary
- Alma mater: Lady Brabourne College
- Occupation: Author
- Spouse: Arinindam Mukhopadhyay
- Writing career
- Language: Bengali
- Genres: Poetry, fiction, drama
- Notable awards: Sahitya Akademi; Ananda Purashkar; Krittibas Puraskar

Mandakranta Sen (born 15 September 1972) is an Indian poet of Bengali language. She became the youngest ever winner of Ananda Puraskar in 1999 for her very first poetry book. In 2004, she was awarded Sahitya Akademi Golden Jubilee Award for poetry. She quit medical studies to become a full-time writer.

== Early life and education ==
Mandakranta was born in Tollygunge, Kolkata in 1972. She completed her secondary education from Sakhawat Memorial Govt. Girls' High School and higher secondary from Lady Brabourne College. She later went on to study MBBS at Nil Ratan Sircar Medical College and Hospital from 1991-1997, but dropped out just before appearing at her final examinations. Thereafter she devoted herself fulltime to literature.

== Literary works ==
Mandakranta is a major voice in 21st century Bengali poetry. She has achieved success in different literary genres like poetry, novel, short story and essays, although she enjoys reputation chiefly as a poet. She is among foremost Bengali writers writing on conjugal and sexual issues of women. Her poetry is regarded as feminist. Her works have been translated into English and Hindi. She has also worked as a lyricist, composer, cover designer and a magazine editor.

== Awards and recognition ==
Mandakranta has been awarded Sahitya Akademi Golden Jubilee Award for young writer for her contributions to Bengali poetry. She has also won numerous other awards including Ananda Puraskar (1999), Krittibas Puraskar and Akash Bangla Barsha Samman etc. She is one of the contributors to Sahitya Akademi journals. She was the youngest ever winner of Ananda Puraskar at the age of 27. She has also given poetry readings in Germany.

== Controversies ==
In 2015 Mandakranta returned her Sahitya Akademi Award in protest against the Dadri incident and the mob attacks on writers and rationalists. In 2017 she was threatened with gang rape for standing by fellow writers who protested against Hindutva terror.

== Bibliography ==
=== Books in English ===
- Sen, Mandakranta (2016). My Heart is an Unruly Girl. Mumbai: Paperwalla Media & Publishing. ISBN 978-93-827493-7-0.
- Sen, Mandakranta (2015). After the Last Kiss. New Delhi: Harper Collins India.

=== Books in Bengali ===
- Sen, Mandakranta (2019). Bosobas. Kolkata: Patra Bharati. ISBN 978-81-837459-0-1.
- Sen, Mandakranta (2005). Shreshtha Kabita. Kolkata: Dey's Publishing. ISBN 978-81-295045-3-1.
- Sen, Mandakranta (2014). Premer Kabita. Kolkata: Saptarshi Prakashan. ISBN 978-93-827067-1-7.
- Sen, Mandakranta (2015). Dalchhoot. Kolkata: Ananda Publishers. ISBN 978-81-775619-6-8.
- Sen, Mandakranta (2018). Jhaptal. Kolkata: Ananda Publishers. ISBN 978-81-264140-8-6.
- Sen, Mandakranta (2015). Hriday Abadhya Meye. Kolkata: Ananda Publishers. ISBN 978-81-721591-2-2.
- Sen, Mandakranta (2017). Kolkobja. Kolkata: Dey's Publishing. ISBN 978-81-295214-7-7.
- Sen, Mandakranta (2019). Swapner Gaan. Kolkata: Dey's Publishing. ISBN 978-81-264467-4-2.
- Sen, Mandakranta (2020). Mithe Kora Kichhu Chora. Kolkata: Dey's Publishing.
- Sen, Mandakranta (2014). Balo Anya Bhave. Kolkata: Ananda Publishers. ISBN 978-81-775610-3-6.
- Sen, Mandakranta (2021). Antyakshari. Kolkata: Dey's Publishing.
- Sen, Mandakranta (2019). Jonmosutra Hotyasutra. Kolkata: Dhansere Publishers. ISBN 978-93-884325-4-2.

=== Chapters in books ===
- Sen, Mandakranta (2017), "Madri and Maria", in Anilkumar, K. S.; Resmi, G. (eds.), Lesbian Stories in Malayalam, vol. 1 (1st ed.), Trivandrum: Chintha Publishers, ISBN 978-81-770239-7-8

=== Journal articles ===
- Sen, Mandakranta (2011). "A Letter from Lesbos". Feminist Studies. 37 (1): 184. doi:10.1353/fem.2011.0010. JSTOR 23069891. S2CID 245665647.
- Sen, Mandakranta (2005). "Offering". Indian Literature. 49 (1): 21. JSTOR i23339387.
- Sen, Mandakranta (2005). "The Believer". Indian Literature. 49 (1): 22. JSTOR i23339387.
- Sen, Mandakranta (2005). "Probabilities". Indian Literature. 49 (1): 23. JSTOR i23339387.
- Sen, Mandakranta (2005). "The Wind". Indian Literature. 49 (1): 24. JSTOR i23339387.
- Sen, Mandakranta (2017). "Sin". Indian Literature. 61 (2): 77. JSTOR 26791267.
- Sen, Mandakranta (2017). "Suicidal". Indian Literature. 61 (2): 78. JSTOR 26791268.
- Sen, Mandakranta (2017). "Exile". Indian Literature. 61 (2): 79–80. JSTOR 26791270.
- Sen, Mandakranta (2017). "The Dream Girl". Indian Literature. 61 (2): 24. JSTOR 26791270.

=== Translated works ===
- Andhi Chhalaang (2006) in Hindi

== See also ==
- Indian Poets
- Sahitya Akademi Award
- Bengali Literature
- Tapan Kumar Pradhan
- Ranjit Hoskote
