= Bhaskar Chakraborty =

Bengali poet and critic

- ভাস্কর চক্রবর্তী
- Born: February 16, 1943
- Died: July 23, 2005 (aged 62)
- Citizenship: Indian
- Occupation: Poet
- Style: Prose style poetry
- Spouse: Basabi Chakraborty

Bhaskar Chakraborty (Bengali pronunciation: [/ˈbʰaʃkor ˌtʃɔkroˈbɔrti/] BAH-skuhr-CHUK-ruh-BOHR-tee; Bengali: [ভাস্কর চক্রবর্তী]) (February 16, 1945 – July 23, 2005) was a Bengali poet and critic from India.

Death and decay were recurring motifs in his works. Critic Amitabha Chaudhury praised him for his "virtuous poetry," recognizing his ability to eliminate "too much ego interference, too much abstract intellect, and too much striving for effects." Chaudhury also commended him for "transforming his personality into the poetry" and for "not being afraid of moments of guilt, dismay, self-reproach, and exhaustion in the voice of his poetry."

== Biography ==
Bhaskar was born in Baranagar, Kolkata, pre-partitioned India. He graduated from Brahmananda Keshab Chandra College, where he met Rudraprasad Sengupta, a faculty member of the college, who is a prominent figure in Bengali theater. He began his literary career in the 1960s, writing poetry. In later years, he wrote book reviews and poetry criticism at Anandabazar Patrika, and Desh magazine. Bhaskar was employed as a schoolteacher. He was married to born as Basabi Chakraborty until his death in 2005. Their only daughter, Praiti is a psychology professor.

== In popular culture ==
- Two of his poetry collections, Eso Susangbad Eso and Sheitkal Kobe Asbe? were referenced during a conversation between two characters in Joy Goswami's short story Marubhumir Shesh Kobita, collected in Bhagnansa Nirnoy.

== Works ==
=== Poetry collections ===
- Shitkal Kabe Asbe Suparna (1971)
- Eso Susangbad Eso (1981)
- Rastay Abar (1983)
- Debotar Sange (1986)
- Akash Angshato Meghla Thakbe (1989)
- Swapno Dekhar Mahara (1993)
- Tumi Amar Ghum (1998)
- Neel Ronger Groho (1999)
- Selected poems (2000)
- Kirakam Acho Manushera (2005)
- Jirafer Bhasha (2005)
- Kabita Samagra (2010)

=== Prose ===
- Priyo Subrata (প্রিয় সুব্রত)
- Shyanjaan(শয়নযান)
- Vivekananda (বিবেকানন্দ)
- Gadyo Samgra, volume 1 (2013)
