= Sagina Mahato =

1970 film by Tapan Sinha

- Film poster
- Directed by: Tapan Sinha
- Written by: Gour Kishore Ghosh
- Produced by: J. K. Kapur; Hemen Ganguly
- Starring: Dilip Kumar; Saira Banu
- Music by: Anup Ghoshal; Assistant; Tapan Sinha
- Release date: 14 April 1970
- Running time: 148 minutes
- Country: India
- Language: Bengali

Sagina Mahato is a 1970 Indian Bengali-language political action drama film produced by Shri J. K. Kapur and directed by Tapan Sinha. The film stars Dilip Kumar and Saira Banu, two acting giants of Indian cinema. The film is based on the true story of the labour movement of 1942–43, told through with fictional characters created by Gour Kishore Ghosh in his short story of the same name, and the mock trial of Sagina Mahato, the trade union leader of a factory in Siliguri. It was entered into the 7th Moscow International Film Festival. The film was shot on locations in Kurseong, near Darjeeling. A diamond-jubilee hit, it created box-office records in Bengal. The film was remade as a Hindi film titled Sagina in 1974, by Sinha with the same leads, produced by the same producers team J.K. Kapur and Hemen Ganguly, though this version wasn't commercially successful. Film music composed by playback singer Anup Ghoshal.

== Plot ==
This is story of a tea estate labour leader in the north eastern region of India during the British Raj. Sagina Mahato fights for the rights of the labourers and dares to face the tyranny of the British bosses. He is helped by a young communist Amal who comes to the place to mobilise the poor and downtrodden masses. Amal, an outsider, turned Sagina into a leader and thus alienated him from the masses by elaborating, appropriating, codifying, and approximating his social hierarchy. The story by Gour Kishore Ghosh, first published in the magazine'Desh' 18 January 1958, reveals the problems of vulgar vanguardism from the radical humanist standpoint.

== Casts ==
- Dilip Kumar as Sagina Mahato
- Saira Banu as Lalita
- Anil Chatterjee
- Bhanu Bandopadhyay
- Swarup Dutta
- Sumita Sanyal
- Romi Chowdhury
- Kalyan Chatterjee

== Awards ==
BFJA Awards in 1971

- Best Actor: Dilip Kumar
- Best Actor in Supporting Role: Anil Chatterjee
- Best Art Direction: Suniti Mitra
- Best Music: Tapan Sinha
- Best Male Playback Singer Award: Anup Ghoshal

8th Moscow International Film Festival

- Best Afro-Asian Film

== See also ==
- History of tea in India
