= Hasan Azizul Huq =

Bangladeshi novelist (1939–2021)

- হাসান আজিজুল হক
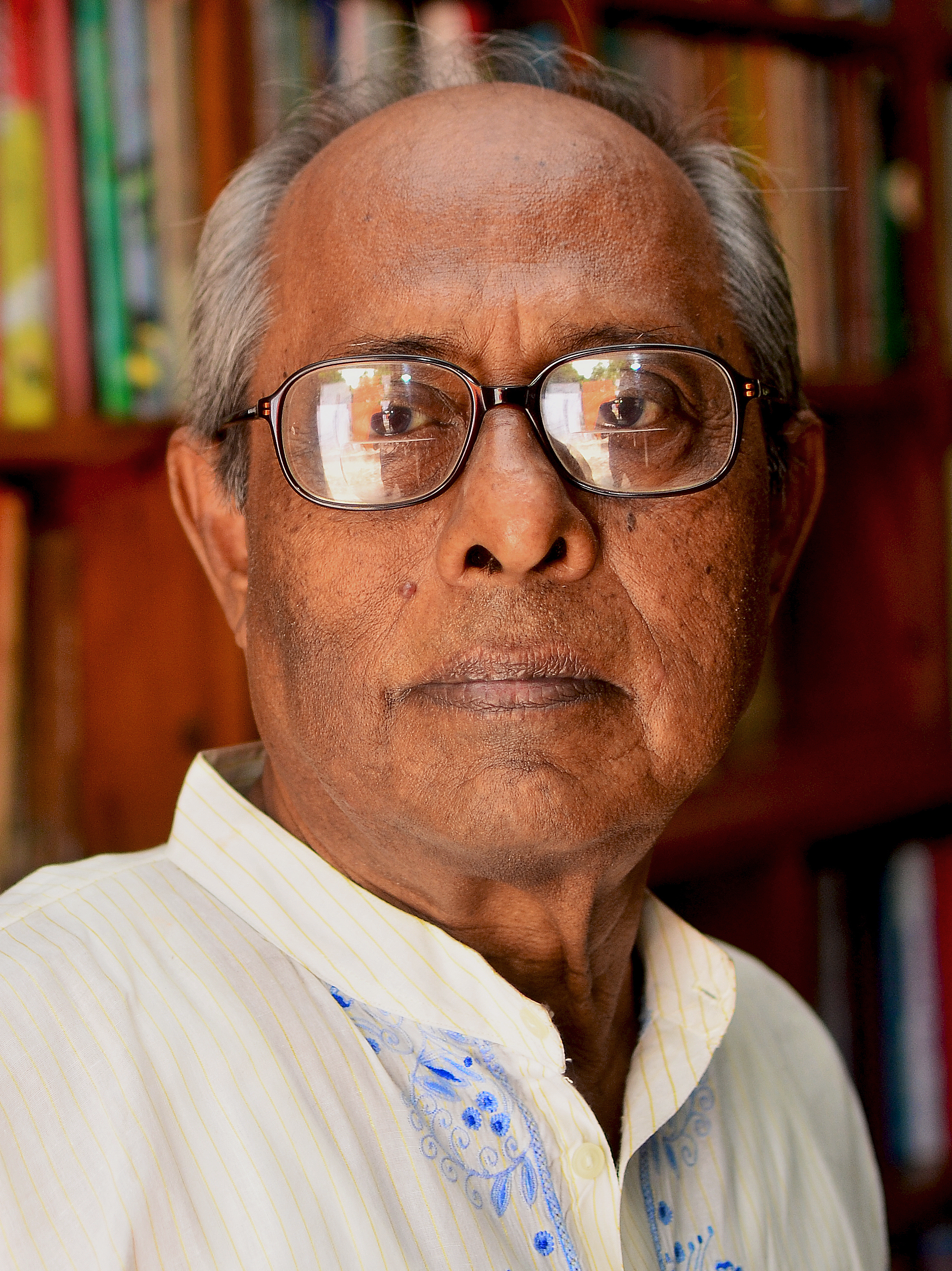
- Azizul Huq in 2012
- Born: 2 February 1939; Jabgraam, Burdwan, Bengal Presidency, British India (now in West Bengal, India)
- Died: 15 November 2021 (aged 82); Rajshahi, Bangladesh
- Education: University of Rajshahi
- Occupation: Writer
- Awards: full list

Hasan Azizul Huq (2 February 1939 – 15 November 2021) was a Bangladeshi short-story writer and novelist. He was awarded Ekushey Padak in 1999, Bangla Academy Literary Award in 1970 and Independence Award in 2019.

== Early life and education ==
Azizul Huq was born in Jabagram in Burdwan district of West Bengal. In 1954, his parents moved to Phultala, near the city of Khulna, Bangladesh. He completed his post-graduation from Rajshahi University in 1960. He served as a faculty in the department of philosophy of the same university. Azizul Huq was the second Bangabandhu Chair of the department of history at the University of Dhaka.

== Career ==
Azizul Huq's first published volume is Samudrer Swapna, Shiter Aranya (1964). Among other notable volumes are: Atmaja o Ekti Karabi Gaachh (1967), Jeeban Ghase Agun (1973), Namhin Gotrohin (1974), Pataale, Haspataale (1981), Kathakataa (1981), Aprakasher Bhaar (1988) and Ma Meyer Sansar (1997) and Raarbanger Golpo (1999). He wrote two autobiographies, Fire Jai Fire Ashi and Uki Diye Digonto.

His stories have been translated into English, Hindi, Urdu, Russian, Czech and Japanese.

== Works ==
- Atmoja O Ekti Karabi Gaach
- Jibon Ghoshe Agun
- Agunpakhi
- Naamhin Gotrahin

== Awards ==
- Bangla Academy Literary Award (1970)
- Ekushey Padak (1999)
- Ananda Purashkar (2008)
- Druhee Katha-Shahityak Abdur Rouf Choudhury Memorial Award
- Adamjee Literary Award
- Lekhok Shibir Puroshkar
- Alaol Sahitya Puroshkar
- Alokto Sahitya Puroshkar
- Agrani Bank Puroshkar
- Philips Sahitya Puroshkar
- Independence Award (2019)

== Death ==
Hasan Azizul Huq died on 15 November 2021 at Bihas Chouddopai University Housing Society, Rajshahi. He was buried in front of the Central Library of Rajshahi University.

Grave of Hasan Azizul Huq at University of Rajshahi
