= Pagali Tomar Sange =

1994 collection of poems by Joy Goswami

Pagli, Tomar Songe
- Author: Joy Goswami
- Language: Bengali
- Genre: Poetry
- Publisher: Ananda Publishers Private Limited
- Publication date: January 1994
- Pages: 79
- ISBN: 81-7215-290-6

Pagli, Tomar Songe (lit. 'Crazy girl, with you') is a collection of 43 poems by Bengali poet Joy Goswami, first published in January 1994 by Ananda Publishers Private Limited.

In 2000, the book won the Sahitya Akademi Award.

== List of poems ==
- "Ma Aar Meyeti"
- "Dukhani Hater Sorobore"
- "Shukno Patar Daale"
- "Sparsho"
- "Kolonko, Ami Kajoler"
- "Masipisi"
- "Poth"
- "Ghumonto Debota"
- "Kukurchanader Golpo"
- "Ke Jonmay, He Boishakh"
- "Ragging"
- "Hans"
- "Mrityuti Rochona Kori"
- "Rin"
- "Eshichi, Kusum"
- "Dol: Shantiniketan"
- "Gitisurjo: Premsongkha"
- "Rishi O Ranga Megh"
- "Bhojoshobha"
- "Tej"
- "Jatismar"
- "O Akashpar"
- "Akashtirer Bondhu"
- "Guptochor"
- "DheuGuchchho"
- "Jashogiti"
- "Ek Line, Du Line"
- "Dikbhram"
- "Ranikuthi"
- "Ekfota"
- "Panchali: Dompotikotha"
- "Prakton"
- "Bondhu"
- "Jwolo"
- "Jolhawar Lekha"
- "Surjodheu, DurbaDal"
- "Sobcheye Unchu Tarake Ami Boli"
- "Surjo"
- "Rupkotha"
- "Boyosondhi"
- "Mrityu Shob Lekhapora"
- "Chokh Paltae Koy"
- "Lokjon"

== Popularity ==
The collection highlights Joy Goswami's distinct style, combining traditional Bengali poetic forms with contemporary themes. Some poems have gained popularity among younger readers and are frequently recited in YouTube videos. Notably, Panchali: Dampatikatha (পাঁচালি: দম্পতিকথা, Ballad: Tale of a Couple) is recognized for its rhythmic experimentation.
