= Dhritikanta Lahiri Choudhury =

Indian conservationist (1931–2019)

- ধৃতিকান্ত লাহিড়ী চৌধুরী
- Born: 10 September 1931; Mymensingh District, Bengal Presidency, British India (now in Bangladesh)
- Died: 1 March 2019 (aged 87); Bhowanipore, Kolkata, West Bengal, India
- Education: Presidency College (B.A.); Calcutta University (M.A.); Leeds University (Ph.D.)
- Occupations: Professor, author
- Children: 1 (son)
- Awards: Ananda Puraskar(2007)

Dhritikanta Lahiri Choudhury (10 September 1931 – 1 March 2019) was an Indian Bengali author and expert on Indian elephants.

== Biography ==
Lahiri Choudhury was born to Dhirendrakanta and Renuka Debi in 1931 in village of Kalipur in the Mymensingh district. After the partition of Bengal his family shifted to Kolkata. He passed M.A. in English literature from Presidency College and completed Ph.D. from the University of Leeds. He served as a professor of Rabindra Bharati University. Lahiri Choudhury travelled over seventy years in the forests of Assam, Barak Valley, West Bengal, Meghalaya, Arunachal Pradesh and Orissa as well as Uttaranchal, Bandipur and Periyar. He gathered huge experiences with elephants and surveyed the status and distribution of elephants, studied man-elephant conflicts and analysed the problems of elephants in India. His books The Great Indian Elephant Book and A Trunk Full of Tales: Seventy Years with the Indian Elephant are considered guidebooks on managing elephants. Lahiri Choudhury wrote two Bengali books Hatir Boi and Jiboner Indradhanu. He also researched Architecture of Calcutta. In 1977 he became a member of the International Union for Conservation of Nature (IUCN) specialist group on elephants and of the advisory committee of Project Elephant under the Government of India in 2004. Lahiri Choudhury received Ananda Purashakar in 2007 for Hatir Boi.

Lahiri Choudhury died on 1 March 2019 at the age of 87.
