= J. K. Kapur =

Indian filmmaker

J. K. Kapur (24 April 1927 in Lahore – 2004) was an Indian filmmaker, producer, social activist, and restaurateur.

During the partition of India in 1947, Kapur migrated to Bombay, India, from modern-day Pakistan, during the partition of India.

He founded Copper Chimney in 1972, the award-winning Indian restaurant chain in Mumbai, India with Prem Chaddha. Copper Chimney is part of K Hospitality Corp, an Indian hospitality and food service company, which continues to be owned by the Kapur family today. J. K. Kapur was also the Senior Vice President of the International World Laughter Club, President of Worli Woods (NGO in Mumbai), Founder-President of the Senior Citizens Helpline and the Chairman of the Indo-Japanese Committee to improve relations between India and Japan.

Kapur produced the historic 1970 Bengali movie, "Sagina Mahato" followed by its Hindi remake, "Sagina," released on 26 July 1974. Dilip Kumar and Saira Banu played the leads in both versions of this tale and Dilip Kumar received various accolades for his role including Best Actor at the BFJA Awards in 1971.
