= Nikhil Sarkar =

Indian historian and writer

Sripantha
- শ্রীপান্থ
- Born: Nikhil Sarkar; 1 May 1932; Gouripur, Mymensingh District, Bengal Presidency, British India (Now in Bangladesh
- Died: 17 August 2004 (aged 72); Calcutta, West Bengal, India
- Other name: Sripantha (শ্রীপান্থ)
- Education: University of Calcutta
- Occupations: Journalist, author, historian
- Organization(s): Jugantar Patrika, Ananda Bazar Patrika
- Known for: Kolkata Karchra (Notebooks of Kolkata)
- Notable work: Ajob Nagori, Sripanther Kolkata, Elokeshi Mohanta Sammand
- Awards: Ananda Puraskar (1978)

Nikhil Sarkar (1 May 1932 – 17 August 2004) popularly known as Sripantha was a Bengali social historian, writer and journalist.

== Early life ==
Sarkar was born at Gouripur village of Mymensingh district in 1932 in British India. After competed primary education in Mymensingh, he graduated in history from the University of Calcutta.

== Literary career ==
He started his journalist career with Bengali daily Jugantar and thereafter joined in Anandabazar Patrika in the 1960s. Sarkar became associate editor of Anandabazar Patrika. He was in charge of the editorial page and Monday column named Kalkatar Karcha (Notebook of Kolkata). His numerous books were published under the pseudonym Sripantha. Sarkar worked on sub-altern history of Kolkata as well as Bengali culture. He was awarded the Ananda Puraskar in 1978.

== List of major works ==
- Ajob Nagari
- Sripanther Kolkata
- Jokhon Chapakhana Elo
- Mohanto Elokeshi Sambad
- Keyabat Meye
- Thagi
- Metiyaburujer Nabab
- Dai
- Bat Tala
- Harem and Debdashi
- Kolkata
