= Jabo na keno? jabo =

Book by Taslima Nasreen

Jabo Na Keno? Jabo (যাবো না কেন? যাবো in Bengali) is the second column collection of Bangladeshi-born feminist and secular humanist writer Taslima Nasrin (তসলিমা নাসরিন).

== Title ==
"Jabo na keno? Jabo." means "Why won't I go? I will." in Bengali. A book of poetry by Bengali poet Shakti Chattopadhyay (শক্তি চট্টোপাধ্য্যায়) is similarly titled Jete pari kintu keno jabo? (যেতে পারি কিন্তু কেন যাবো?)", meaning "I can go if I wish. But why will I go?".

== Description ==
The book starts with some very emotional columns. In the first column, she says that often she wishes to die by taking opium. She shares that her father used to say, "Opium is the cause of peaceful death." She speaks of her loneliness in male-dominated society and how as a result she often thought about suicide.

There is also a sentence in the first column, "Deergho Ekti Jeebon Eka Hantbo Bole Jutor Sukhtala puru kore mota sutoy genthechi (দীর্ঘ একটি জীবন একা হাঁটবো বলে জুতোর সুখতলা পুরু করে মোটা সুতোয় গেঁথেছি in Bengali)", which means "I have thickened the soles of my shoes, to walk on the long road of life that lies ahead of me". One of her poems titled "Ei Korechi Valo" (এই করেছি ভাল, "I have done the right thing" also begins with the same sentence, rearranged in two lines. This poem was compiled in her fifth poetry book titled Balikar Gollachut (বালিকার গোল্লাছুট).

The second column starts, "Taslima Nasrin had died. Yes, she died indeed. She is revived now. She can breathe in fresh air, now she can smell the green of the trees, now she can drench in sunshine, in water, in full moon. She watched how terrible and ugly death is. A person who wakes up from death knows how beautiful life is, how wonderful it is to live on." The rest of the column is written as an emotional poem titled "Ghumvangania" ("To Awake"). The poem was compiled in her sixth poetry collection titled Behula Eka Vasiyechilo Vela ("Behula alone wafted the raft") which was published in February 1993.

The book also contains a column where she criticised the suicide of a famous Bengali actress, saying "If suicide can solve all the problems, then women of every house should have erased their trails from the earth by committing suicide." She ends the column by saying, "I hope that a pathetic, weak and man-oriented person like you would not be born on earth again."
