= Agunpakhi =

Bengali novel

- The first edition published by Sandhani Prakashani
- Author: Hasan Azizul Huq
- Original title: আগুনপাখি
- Cover artist: Qayyum Chowdhury (of the 1st edition by Sandhani Prakashani)
- Language: Bengali
- Genre: Historical novel
- Publisher: Sandhani Prakashani from Dhaka, Bangladesh and Dey's Publishing from Kolkata, India
- Publication date: The 1st edition by Sandhani Prakashani in 2006
- Publication place: Bangladesh
- Pages: 158 (1st edition by Sandhani Prakashani)
- ISBN: 9788129508201
- OCLC: 233697580

Agunpakhi (English: The Phoenix) is a novel by Bangladeshi writer Hasan Azizul Huq. First published in 2006, the novel was awarded Prothom Alo book of the year prize in 2007 and Ananda Purashkar in 2008.

== Plot summary ==
Agunpakhi is set in rural Rarh, now in West Bengal, of early twentieth century. It chronicles a rural family's ups and downs. The story is told by a country housewife in first person narrative. The story begins a score years before the Partition of India. She makes a powerful observation of herself and people around her. Through her eyes, we see the way of life of the then Rarh region.

In the early part of the novel, she mostly speaks of life within the family: births, deaths, marriages. Their fortunes blossom as they become the largest landowner in the area. But as World War II breaks out, they get hit by cholera, shortages, crop failure, and finally the trauma of Hindu-Muslim division. With these events, the story transcends its domestic confinement.

The narrator comments on her world being consumed by a divisiveness that had nothing to do with their lives. At the end of the novel, her children set for Pakistan, and later they ask their parents to join them. Her husband agrees, but she refuses to go. Her decision to stay back alone astonishes her husband. In answer to her husband's question, “When did you learn so much?” she says, “All these years I've only learned what you taught me and I've only said what you had me say. Now though, I've learned one or two things on my own.”
