= Dwikhandito =

2003 book by Taslima Nasreen

- 2018 version translated into English and published as 'Split: A Life'
- Author: Taslima Nasrin
- Language: Bengali language
- Series: Amar Meyebela
- Genre: Autobiography
- Published: 2003
- Publisher: People's Book Society
- Publication place: India
- Media type: Print (hardcover)
- ISBN: 9788185383477
- Preceded by: Utal Hawa (Wild Wind)
- Followed by: Seisob Andhokar (Those Dark Days)

Dwikhandito ("Split in two") is an autobiographical book of Bengali novelist and poet Taslima Nasrin, published in 2003. This is the third volume of Amar Meyebela. The book was first published in Bangladesh under the title Ko ("Speak") and banned. It was also banned in the Indian state of West Bengal for two years alleging insult of religious beliefs and obscenity. In March 2018 the book was translated into English and published as Split: A Life by Penguin Random House.

== Controversy ==
Writer claimed that the book tells about her experiences and works as a doctor, how she became the target of fundamentalists. Dwikhandito or Ko was banned by a Dhaka Court and its copies have been confiscated following a defamation suit moved by a senior Bengali poet and novelist, Syed Shamsul Haq, against the writer. Kolkata based intellectuals, at the instance of the Calcutta Khilafat Committee, had urged the state government to ban the controversial book in the interest of communal amity. At the same time five fatwas were issued against her for writing this book. Sunil Gangopadhayay said in Kolkata that Dwikhandito is not literature. It may be good to read if you are interested in scandals about some writers. But it is not literature. Writer Dibyendu Palit opined that they must have imposed the ban after taking note of the appeal made by Muslim intellectuals who had apprehended that the book might foment communal discord. Several Bangladeshi and Indian writers called the book a "fictitious fantasy" about sexual encounters. The Left Front Government banned the book on 28 November 2003 fearing that book could incite communal discord. The then Chief Minister of West Bengal Buddhadeb Bhattacharya decided to ban the book after consulting intellectuals. CPI (M) leader Anil Biswas said that Dwikhandito may create riot and disturb communal harmony in West Bengal. Kolkata Police had seized about 3,000 copies of the book from its local publisher. Government stated that it contains matters on pages 49 and 50 which could promote enmity, ill-will and hatred between different groups on grounds of religion, punishable under Section 153A of the Indian Penal Code. It was alleged that Nasrin's statement in this book on Prophet Mohammad hurts the sentiments of the Muslim community. On 18 November 2003, the Calcutta High Court put out an injunction against publication after a poet, Syed Hasmat Jalal, filed an 11 crore INR defamation suit against Nasrin. On 22 September 2005, the Division Bench of Hon'ble Justice Dilip Seth lifted the ban.
