= Sachindranath Bandyopadhyay =

Indian Writer (1920–1999)

- Born: 6 September 1920; Kalighat, Calcutta, Bengal Presidency, British Raj
- Died: 26 May 1999 (aged 78); Chetla, Calcutta, West Bengal, India
- Education: Ashutosh College
- Occupations: Poet; Dramatist; Fiction Writer
- Spouse: Uma Bandyopadhyay
- Parent: Satishchandra Bandyopadhyay (father) Suruchi Devi (mother)
- Writing career
- Notable awards: Bankim Puraskar (1988)

Shachindranath Bandyopadhyay (born 6 September 1920 - died 26 May 1999) was a poet, essayist and playwright. He received the Bankim Puraskar award for his novel Bandare Bandare in 1987, the highest award given by the West Bengal Government for contributions to Bengali literature.

== Sources ==
- প্রতিবেদক, কালবেলা (26 May 2024). "শচীন্দ্রনাথ বন্দ্যোপাধ্যায়". কালবেলা (in Bengali).
- "বিস্মৃতপ্রায় কথাসাহিত্যিক শচীন্দ্রনাথ বন্দ্যোপাধ্যায় /নির্মল বর্মন". জ্বলদর্চি (in Bengali). 25 September 2024.
- Bangla, Jago (26 May 2024). "শচীন্দ্রনাথের বিয়ে দিয়েছিলেন বিভূতিভূষণ". JagoBangla.
