= Sagina (film) =

- Film poster
- Directed by: Tapan Sinha
- Screenplay by: Tapan Sinha
- Story by: Rupadarshi
- Produced by: J. K. Kapur
- Starring: Dilip Kumar; Saira Banu
- Narrated by: Dilip Kumar
- Cinematography: Bimal Mukherjee
- Edited by: Subodh Roy
- Music by: S. D. Burman
- Release date: 15 July 1974
- Country: India
- Language: Hindi

Sagina is a 1974 Hindi film, produced by J. K. Kapur and directed by Tapan Sinha, the film stars Dilip Kumar, Saira Banu, Aparna Sen, and Om Prakash. It was a remake of 1970 Bengali movie Sagina Mahato directed by Tapan Sinha with the same lead pair in the cast. This version was a commercial failure, and Dilip Kumar's first consecutive failure in almost three decades since 1945.

== Plot ==
Sagina is a factory laborer, and an aggressive, honest and lovable character who was the first to fight against the tyranny of the British bosses in the tea gardens of North-Eastern India.

== Cast ==
- Dilip Kumar as Sagina Mahato
- Saira Banu as Lalita
- Aparna Sen as Vishakha
- Om Prakash as Guru
- Kader Khan as Anupam Dutt
- K. N. Singh as Factory Owner

== Soundtrack ==
The film has music by S. D. Burman and lyrics by Majrooh Sultanpuri. This movie marked the first and only time Kishore Kumar sang for Dilip Kumar. "Chote Chote Sapne Hamar" was reused from the Bengali film, Sagina Mahato, with music by Anup Ghoshal.

Sagina

Soundtrack album by S. D. Burman
- Released: July 15, 1974
- Genre: Feature film soundtrack
- Length: 14:37
- Language: Hindi
- Label: Saregama
- Producer: S. D. Burman

S. D. Burman chronology
Prem Nagar (1974)	Sagina (1974)	Chupke Chupke (1975)

Songs
No.	Title	Playback	Length
1.	"Aaj Sala Koi Shala - Commentary"	Ameen Sayani and Dilip Kumar	1:28
2.	"Uparwala Dukhion Ki Nahin Sunta Re"	Kishore Kumar and Dilip Kumar	3:42
3.	"Tumhare Sang To Rain Bitai"	Kishore Kumar and Lata Mangeshkar	3:08
4.	"Sala Main To Sahab Ban Gaya"	Kishore Kumar and Pankaj Mitra	4:41
5.	"Gajab Chamke Bindiya Teri"	Kishore Kumar and Asha Bhosle	3:05
Total length:			14:37

== Awards and legacy ==
Dilip Kumar earned one more nomination in the category of best actor in the 22nd Filmfare Awards. The film won the 1974 Filmfare Best Art Direction Award for Sudhendu Roy. In the 1975 film Chupke Chupke a billboard featuring the poster can briefly be seen.
