= Abhijit Sen (writer) =

Indian writer (1945- )

Abhijit Sen (born 1945) is an Indian Bengali writer in late 20th Century. He received Bankim Puraskar for his novel Rohu Chandaler Har in 1992.

== Early life and career ==
Abhijit Sen was born in the village of Mahakumar Keora in Jhalakathi, Barisal, British India. After the partition, he came to Calcutta and became involved in the political Naxalite movement. He completed his MA in history. He began writing while living in Balurghat from 1970. His first novel, Rahu Chandaler Haar, was published in 1985. This novel, which tells the story of the life and struggle of a nomadic group in North Bengal, brought him special fame in the Bengali literary world. In 1992, Abhijit Sen received the Bankim Puraskarfor Rahu Chandaler Haar and in 2005, the University of Calcutta awarded him the Saratchandra Smriti Puraskar.

== Published books ==
- Rahu Chandaler Haar (1985)
- Ondhokarer Nodi (1988)
- Chaayar Pakhi (1993)
- Aandhar Mahish (1993)
- Halud Ronger Surjo (1996)
- Swapno Ebong Onnano Nilima (2000)
- Nimno Gotir Nadi (2006)
- Megher Nadi (2007)
- Mousumi Samundrer Upokul (2006)
- Rajpat Dharmapat (2008)
- Nangno Nirjan Haat (2008)
- Lash Kata Ghorer Samne Opekha (2011)
- Debangshi (1990)
- Brahmanya and Onnano Golpo (1995)
- Abhijit Sen's Best Stories (2005)
- Abhijit Sen's Ten Stories (2008)

== Awards ==
- Bankim Puraskar (1992)
- Saratchandra Smriti Puraskar (2005)
