= Arunava Sinha =

Indian translator and former journalist

- অরুনাভ সিনহা
- Born: 1962 (age 63–64); Calcutta, West Bengal, India
- Citizenship: Indian
- Education: Jadavpur University
- Occupations: translator, professor
- Website: https://arunavasinha.in/

Arunava Sinha is an Indian translator, former journalist, and professor of creative writing at Ashoka University, Haryana. He is also the co-director of the Ashoka Centre for Translation. His work mainly involves translating Bengali fiction and nonfiction, both classical and contemporary, into English, as well as translating from English into Bengali. As of 2025, over ninety of his translations have been published. He has received translation awards and has been shortlisted for others, both in India and abroad. He has conducted translation workshops at institutions including the British Centre for Literary Translation (UEA), the University of Chicago, the Dhaka Translation Centre, and Jadavpur University, and has worked with translators internationally.

== Early life and career ==
Sinha was born in Kolkata, India, and spent his early childhood in Mahim, Mumbai. In an interview with the writer Nilanjana S Roy, he recalled his first memories of language as being in Marathi, spoken by older children in the household. However, his earliest meaningful exposure to language came through songs played by his mother, particularly Rabindrasangeet sung by Debabrata Biswas, which left a lasting impression on him.

From the age of four, Sinha began reading in Bengali, his mother tongue. At eight, he transitioned to reading exclusively in English, although Bengali remained the language of communication with family and neighbourhood friends. He describes himself as being bilingual from childhood, though he did not enjoy studying Bengali as a subject in school.

Sinha pursued his undergraduate studies in electrical engineering but soon realised it was not his calling. He switched to studying English literature at Jadavpur University, where he developed a deeper appreciation for language and literature.

His journey into translation began during his college years, when he gave a talk on translation. This early exposure sparked his interest in the field, leading him to translate short stories for a city magazine in Kolkata.

In 1992, Sinha undertook his first book-length translation, translating Sankar's novel Chowringhee from Bengali to English. This project came about when Sankar requested that he translate the novel for a French publisher. Years later, in 2007, the translation was published by Penguin India, marking the beginning of Sinha's professional career as a translator.

== See also ==
- Sukanta Chaudhuri
- Sankar
- Rabisankar Bal
