= Ketaki Kushari Dyson =

Indian-born poet, novelist and playwright (1940–2026)

- Born: Ketaki Kushari; 26 June 1940; Kushtia, Bengal Province, British India
- Died: 11 September 2026 (aged 86) near Oxford, England
- Education: Jadavpur University, Oxford University
- Occupations: Poet, novelist, translator, literary critic, diaspora scholar
- Spouse: Robert Dyson
- Writing career
- Language: Bengali, English
- Genres: Poetry, novel, essay
- Subjects: Bengali, England, Indian Diaspora
- Notable works: Various Universe: The Journals and Memoirs of British Men and Women in the Indian Subcontinent, 1765-1856, (1980) In Your Blossoming Flower-Garden: Rabindranath Tagore and Victoria Ocampo (1985) Notan Notan Payraguli (1983)
- Notable awards: Ananda Purashkar
- Website: ketakikusharidyson.org

Ketaki Kushari Dyson (née Ketaki Kushari; 26 June 1940 – 11 September 2026) was an Indian-born poet, novelist, playwright, translator and critic, diaspora writer and scholar. Born in Kushtia, Bengal Province, British India, she lived most of her adult life near Oxford. She wrote in Bengali and English, on topics as wide-ranging as Bengal, England, the various diaspora, feminism and women's issues, cultural assimilation, multiculturalism, gastronomy, social and political topics.

== Early life and education ==
In an interview with Voice of America in 2011, Ketaki Kushari Dyson spoke at length of the deep influence of Rabindranath Tagore's and Buddhadeb Bosu's works in her early life and introduction to poetry. She began writing poetry at the age of four and recalled Sishu (1903), a collection of Bengali poems for children by Tagore, as the first book she read, followed by Katha-O-Kahini (1908).

Dyson was educated in Kolkata, India, at Jadavpur University, where she studied English Literature, and at The University of Oxford, UK. Her doctoral thesis at Oxford University, entitled 'Various Universe: The Journals and Memoirs of British Men and Women in the Indian Subcontinent, 1765–1856', explores the writings of British men and women on their experiences of the Indian subcontinent from the early rule of the East India Company (Company Raj), until just before the Indian Rebellion of 1857 (Indian Mutiny).

== Career ==
Dyson, remarkably, continued to write both in her native Bengali as well as in English. She published extensively in both languages. Her body of work includes numerous volumes of poetry, translations (mostly of poetry by Rabindranath Tagore and Buddhadeb Bosu), collections of essays, a volume of autobiographical sketches, two Bengali novels, scholarly studies of early British colonists in India and of Victoria Ocampo, and Bengali plays (one of them translated into English). Her novel, Notan Notan Payra Guli, which was published in instalments in the Bengali magazine Desh (1981–82) was deemed an instant success. In this novel, Kushari Dyson depicts contemporary life and struggle of immigrants in Britain, through the eyes of a Bengali woman.

== Personal life and death ==
In 1964, she married Robert Dyson. Ketaki Kushari Dyson died on 11 September 2026, at the age of 86.

== Awards and recognition ==
- Ananda Puraskar (1986 and 1997)
- Bhubanmohini Dasi Medal of the University of Calcutta for eminent contribution to contemporary Bengali letters (1986)
- Star Ananda Award in Bengali Literature

== Selected work ==
=== Poetry ===
- Bokol (1997)
- Sap-wood (1978)
- Shobij Prithibi (Bengali poems), Ananda Publishers, Calcutta (1980)
- Hibiscus in the North (English poems, pamphlet), Mid-day Publications, Old Fire Station Arts Centre, Oxford (1979)
- Joler Koridor Dhorey (Bengali poems), Navana, Calcutta (1981)
- Spaces I Inhabit (English poems), Navana, Calcutta (1983)
- Katha Boltey Dao (Bengali poems), Ananda, Calcutta (1992)

=== Novels ===
- Noton Noton Pairaguli (Bengali novel), Ananda Publishers, Calcutta, 1983. (Serialized in Desh in 1981–2)
- Rabindranath o Victoria Ocampor Sandhaney (Bengali novel combined with research and translation work), Navana, Calcutta, 1985. (Winner of the Prafullakumar Sarkar Memorial Ananda Prize, Calcutta, 1986.) New edition reissued by Dey's, Calcutta, 1997.

=== Academic work ===
- A Various Universe: The Journals and Memoirs of British Men and Women in the Indian Subcontinent, 1765-1856, Oxford University Press, Delhi, 1978; reprinted: 1980. (Book based on doctoral work at Oxford) New edition with a new preface, 2002.
- Ed., with Pauline Burton and Shirley Ardener, Bilingual Women: Anthropological Approaches to Second Language Use, Berg Publishers, Oxford & Providence, 1994. Distributed in the US by New York University Press. (There is a paper here entitled ‘Forging a Bilingual Identity: A Writer’s Testimony’)
- Ranger Robindranath co-authored by Shushovan Adhikari, Parabaash, 2001

=== Essays and biographical work ===
- Nari, Nogori (Bengali, autobiographical sketches), Ananda Publishers, Calcutta, 1981. (Serialized in Desh in the sixties)
- Bhabonar Bhaskarya (Bengali collected essays), Dey's, Calcutta, 1988.
- Shikorbakor (Bengali collected essays from the sixties), Ananda, Calcutta, 1990.
