= Meyebela, My Bengali Girlhood =

Book by Taslima Nasreen

- Author: Taslima Nasrin
- Language: Bengali; English
- Genre: Autobiography
- Publisher: Steerforth
- Publication date: June 1, 1998
- Media type: Hardback
- Pages: 300
- ISBN: 1-58642-051-8
- OCLC: 49650304
- Dewey Decimal: 891.4/4171 B 21
- LC Class: PK1730.3.A65 Z46 2002

Meyebela, My Bengali Girlhood is a 1998 autobiographical book by Bangladeshi doctor, turned feminist writer Taslima Nasrin.

== Synopsis ==
This autobiographical book tells Nasrin's story from birth to adolescence. The Bengali term Meyebela means "girlhood". The book has been banned in Bangladesh because "its contents might hurt the existing social system and religious sentiments of the people."

The book is very frank about her father and mother. Her father is described by Nasrin as rude and tyrannical. Nasrin was also sexually exploited by two of her family elders (uncles). She also said: "When I was at the hospital (in Dhaka), I treated so many seven- or eight-year-old girls who were raped by their male relatives, some 50 or 60 years old. I treated them, and I remembered when I was raped."

Nasrin has in this and in her other books written about women's rights in Bangladesh: "Girls suffer, especially in Muslim countries," she said. "I could not go out and run in the fields. I was supposed to stay home to learn how to cook, to clean. Women are not treated as human beings. They are taught for centuries that they are slaves of men."
