= Mihir Sengupta =

Indian writer of Bengali language (1946–2022)

- Born: 1 September 1946; Keora, Barisal, British India
- Died: 17 January 2022 (Age 75); Kolkata, India
- Education: Brojomohun College
- Occupations: Bank employee, writer
- Notable work: Bisadbrikhho
- Awards: Ananda Purashkar (2005)

Mihir Sengupta (1946 – 17 January 2022) was an Indian writer of Bengali literature.

He was best known for his 2005 autobiography Bishaad Brikkho ('Tree of Sorrow'). It describes the atrocities of post-partition East Pakistan as seen by the author, who was uprooted from his native Barisal in present-day Bangladesh and ended up in Calcutta as a refugee. Bishaad Brikkho is regarded as an important literary document of the atrocities of post-partition West Pakistan and won the Ananda Puroshkar literary prize. Sengupta died in Kolkata of blood cancer on 17 January 2022, at the age of 75.
