= Alokeranjan Dasgupta =

Bengali poet (1933–2020)

- Born: 6 October 1933; Kolkata, Bengal Presidency, British India
- Died: 17 November 2020 (aged 87); Heidelberg, Baden-Württemberg, Germany
- Education: Viswa Bharati University; Presidency College; Calcutta University (PhD)
- Occupations: Writer, author
- Writing career
- Language: Bengali; German
- Notable awards: Ananda Puraskar(1985), Rabindra Puraskar(1987), Sahitya Akademi Award(1992), Goethe Medal(1985), Pravasi Bharatiya Samman (2005)

Alokeranjan Dasgupta (6 October 1933 – 17 November 2020) was a Bengali poet who was the author of over 20 books of poetry. He translated Bengali and Santal poetry and plays into English and German, and also translated literature from German and French into Bengali. He also published a number of books of essays, and was well known for his distinctive prose style.

== Education ==
Dasgupta was born in 1933 in Kolkata. He studied at Visva-Bharati, Santiniketan, and then at St. Xavier's College, the Presidency College, and finally at the University of Calcutta, gaining a Ph.D. for his studies on the lyric in Indian poetry. He used also to be associated vigorously with the little magazines and translate the original German works into Bengali.

== Career ==
After completing his Ph.D., Dasgupta taught comparative literature and Bengali at the Department of Comparative Literature (founded by Buddhadeva Bose) at Jadavpur University from 1957 until 1971, when he went to Germany on a Humboldt Foundation Fellowship. Since 1971, he taught at the faculty of the South Asia Institute of the University of Heidelberg, Germany. He was closely associated with the Deutsche-Indische Gessellschaft (DIG), which is a premier institution for promoting close links between India and Germany.

A poet much admired by his fellow poets and the wannabes, his poetry is known for both thematic and technical innovations. The German government felicitated him for his contribution to bring together two different cultures together by awarding him the Goethe Medal in 1985.

== Awards ==
Dasgupta received many awards and honors including the Sudha Basu award from the University of Calcutta (1983), the Goethe Prize in Germany (1985), the Ananda Purashkar (1985), the Pravasi Bharatiya Samman (1985), the Rabindra Puraskar (1987), the Sahitya Akademi Award (1992) for his book of poems Marami Karat (translated as The Mystical Saw and Other Poems) and the Pravasi Bharatiya Samman (2005).

== Bibliography ==
- Saranarthir Ritu O Shilpa Bhabna, Ananda Publishers, 1993. ISBN 81-7215-159-4.
- Bhramane Nay Bhubane, Ananda Publishers. ISBN 81-7066-145-5.
- Chayapathera Sandra Samlapika, Ananda Publishers. ISBN 81-7215-277-9.
- Ekhanao Nameni, Bandhu, Niukliyara sitera Godhuli, Ananda Publishers. ISBN 81-7215-996-X.
- Jvarera Ghore Taraju Kempe Yaya
- Samabayi silpera Garaje
- Tushara Jure Trisulacihna
- Problems of Translation from South Asian Languages (by Universitat Heidelberg, Alokeranjan Dasgupta)
- The Lyric In Indian Poetry (1962)
- The Mystical Saw and Other Poems (by Roland Hindmarsh, Sahitya Akademi, Alokeranjan Dasgupta) (1996)
- Satabarshikira alochayaya (2000)
- The Shadow of a Kite and Other Essays (2004)
- Alo Aro Alo (Collection of poems) (Abhijan Publishers, 2009)
- Se Ki Khunje Pelo Iswerkana (Collection of poems) (Abhijan Publishers, 2012)
- Nirishwar Pakhider Upasonalaye (Collection of poems) (Abhijan Publishers, 2013)
- Ekhon Nabhonil Amar Tahabil (Collection of poems) (Abhijan Publishers, 2014)
