= Gour Kishore Ghosh =

Indian writer and journalist (1923–2000)

- Born: 20 June 1923; Gopalpur, Bengal Presidency, British India (now in Bangladesh)
- Died: 15 December 2000 (aged 77); Calcutta, West Bengal, India
- Education: Nabadwip Bakultala High School
- Occupation: Journalism
- Writing career
- Pen name: Rupadarshi
- Notable awards: Magsaysay Award (1981); Bankim Puraskar (1982)

Gour Kishore Ghosh (20 June 1923 – 15 December 2000) was an Indian writer and journalist in Bengali. Associated with Anandabazar Patrika for decades, Ghosh was known for his novels Desh Mati Manush and Prem Nei. He was the first editor of Aajkaal.

== Early life ==
Ghosh was born in Hat Gopalpur village in the Jessore district in undivided Bengal (presently Bangladesh), on 20 June 1923.

Due to poverty, Ghosh could not continue his education further and had to become a professional soon after.

He varied his professions between 1941 and 1953. Amongst others, he worked as private tutor, electrician and fitter, sailor, waiter at restaurants, trade union organiser, schoolteacher, manager of a touring dance troupe, land customs clearing clerk, proof reader and others, until from an interim job as a border customs clerk he joined a new daily newspaper, Satyayuga where his distinctive writing style earned him promotion to editor of two feature sections. Thus, he settled at his chosen profession, that of a reporter / journalist.

== Journalistic and literary career ==
Ghosh wrote columns in the literary weekly Desh and in Calcutta's largest vernacular daily, Anandabazar Patrika, of which he also became senior editor. He portrayed the agony of West Bengal during the Naxalite movement from 1969 to 1971, in sharp satire, in his "News Commentary by Rupadarshi". He often wrote under his pen-name, Rupadarshi.

After the emergency was imposed upon India in 1975, Ghosh shaved his head and wrote a symbolic letter to his 13-year-old son explaining his act of "bereavement" over the loss of his freedom to write. Published in Kolkata, a Bengali monthly, this letter caused his arrest, was widely circulated through the underground and became a classic of protest. He was sent to jail along with another reporter Barun Sengupta. Ghosh smuggled from prison two other letters on abuses of authoritarian rule before, in his cell, he suffered a third heart attack.

Although reinstated as a senior editor of Ananda Bazar Patrika after the emergency ended and he had recovered from his illness, Ghosh started Aajkaal (This Time), in collaboration with a few associates in early 1980s.

After a short stint with Aajkal, he wrote for Anandabazar Patrika until the end.

His weekly satirical column was famous, as also a series of humorous stories. His mature work chose the rather neglected field of interaction between Hindu and Muslim societies.

Among his lighter works, Brojoda, although not as popular as Feluda, GhanaDa and Tenida, has left his distinct mark in the so-called dada-literature of Bengal.

== Awards ==
Ghosh's awards include:

1. Ananda Purashkar for Literature (1970).
2. Ko Joy Uk Memorial award (1976), from the South Korean Government.
3. Ramon Magsaysay Award (1981) for Journalism, Literature and Creative Communication Arts.
4. Maharashtra Government Award (1981).
5. Bankim Puraskar (1982).
6. Hardayal Harmony Award (1993).
7. Maulana Abul Kalam Azad Award (1993).

== List of major works ==
Short story collections:

1. Ei Kolkatay (1952)
2. Mon Maney Na (1955)
3. Sagina Mahato (1969)
4. Poschimbongo Ek Promod Toroni, Ha ha! (1969)
5. Aamra Jekhaney (June 1970)
6. Prem ney
7. Jol Porey Pata Norey
8. Brojodar Goolpo Samagra

Sagina Mahato, a story written by him in remembrance of a colleague of his in his political activist past, was successfully adopted into movies in Hindi (Sagina) and Bengali (Sagina Mahato) by Tapan Sinha, with the famous thespian Dilip Kumar playing the part of the protagonist Sagina Mahato in both instances.

== Personal life ==
He died on 15 December 2000. In 2011, Gour Kishore Ghosh metro station, a Kolkata Metro station was named after him.
