= Nalini Bera =

Indian Author

Nalini Bera is an Indian short story writer and novelist.

== Literature works ==
- Ure Jay Karikuri Pakhira
- Uthila Suyari Basila Nahi
- Jha Jha Roudre Athaba Fin Fota Jyotsnay
- Halud Baner Tusu
- Amful Jamfuiler Desh
- Subarnarenu Subarnarekha
- Bhalobasar Basa Badal
- Panchali
- Epar Ganga Opar Ganga

== Awards ==
He was awarded the Bankim Puraskar in 2008 for Shabor Charit and Ananda Puraskar in 2019 Subarnarenu Subarnarekha.
