= Lajja (novel) =

1993 book by Taslima Nasreen

- Author: Taslima Nasrin
- Language: Bengali
- Genre: Novel
- Publication date: 1993
- Publication place: Bangladesh
- English publication date: October 1997
- Media type: Print (Hardback & Paperback)
- Pages: 302
- ISBN: 1-57392-165-3
- OCLC: 37322498
- Dewey Decimal: 891.4/437 21
- LC Class: PK1730.3.A65 L3513 1997

Lajja (Bengali: লজ্জা Lôjja) (Shame) is a novel in Bengali by Taslima Nasrin, a writer of Bangladesh. The word lajja/lôjja means "shame" in Bengali and many other Indo-Aryan languages. The book was written about the violence, rape, looting and killings of Bengali Hindus that took place in December 1992 after the destruction of Babri Masjid took place in India. The book was first published in 1993 in Bengali and was subsequently banned in Bangladesh. It nonetheless sold 50,000 copies in the six months after its publication, though Taslima fled her native Bangladesh after receiving death threats from Islamic groups.

Nasrin dedicated the book "to the people of the Indian subcontinent," beginning the text with the words, "let humanity be the other name of religion." The novel is preceded by a preface and a chronology of events.

== Synopsis ==
Lajja is a response of Taslima Nasrin to anti-Hindu riots that erupted in parts of Bangladesh, soon after the demolition of Babri Masjid in India on 6 December 1992. The book subtly indicates that communal feelings were on the rise, the Hindu minority of Bangladesh was oppressed, and secularism was under shadow.

== Plot summary ==
In Ayodhya, in the state of Uttar Pradesh in India, on 6 December 1992, Babri Masjid is demolished. The demolition has repercussions in Bangladesh. The fire of communal rioting erupts, and the Dutta family feels and faces the heat of the communal hatred. Each member of the family feels about this in his/her own way.

Sudhamoy, the patriarch, feels that Bangladesh, his motherland, will never let him down. Kiranmayee as a faithful wife stands by her husband's views. Suranjan, their son, believes that nationalism will be stronger than communalism but is progressively disappointed. He finds himself adopting communal reactions that contrast entirely with the ideology of patriotism he has always had faith in. Nilanjana curses her brother's apathy and coaxes his brother to take the family to a Muslim friend's house for safety.

It is a story of metamorphosis, in which disastrous events create disillusionment, resulting in violence and resentment.

== Translations ==
Lajja has been translated into many languages including French, Dutch, German, English, Spanish, Italian, Swedish, Norwegian, Finnish, Icelandic, Persian, Arabic, Assamese, Kannada, Hindi, Gujarati, Odia, Urdu, Marathi, Telugu, Tamil, Punjabi, Nepali Malayalam and Sinhalese.

== See also ==
- Shame society
- List of books banned by governments
