= Sunanda Sanyal =

Indian academic, essayist, columnist, and social activist (1934–2022)

- Born: 1 February 1934; Pabna, Bengal Presidency, British India
- Died: 22 March 2022 (aged 88); Kolkata, West Bengal, India
- Occupation: Academician
- Children: Sugata Sanyal

Sunanda Sanyal (1 February 1934 – 22 March 2022) was an Indian eminent academic, essayist, social activist and columnist from West Bengal.

== Life ==
Sanyal was born into an illustrious family of Pabna in British India (now in Bangladesh) on 1 February 1934. He completed his schooling at Pabna and came to Kolkata for higher studies and thereafter at Hyderabad and Leeds University.

Sanyal did his graduation and post-graduation in English literature from University of Calcutta. He got his postgraduate DTE degree from English and Foreign Languages University at Hyderabad in the early 1970s.

== Career ==
Sanyal started his career as a teacher in English at the Ramakrishna Mission Vidyamandira at Belur Math. He was also a part-time English lecturer in University of Calcutta and University of Burdwan at Burdwan. He wrote articles on different social issues in different English and vernacular newspapers.

Sanyal opposed the Left Front government’s decision not to teach English in the primary classes. As a member of the state education commission, he gave his note of dissent on the LF government’s English language policy decision for which he was upbraided by the chairman of the commission, Ashok Mitra, the then Minister of the LF government.

Sanyal was also closely involved with the All Bengal Save Education Committee headed by Tarunkanti Naskar. Professor Sanyal had always wanted proper education for poor rural children. Because of his prolonged opposition against the LF government’s education policy, the government was finally forced to bring back English in the primary level.

Sanyal, along with several others, formed Ganamukti Parishad to support the movements launched by Mamata Banerjee in Singur, Nandigram and Jungle mahal. He visited these areas and took part in rallies and meetings to create public opinion.

== Death ==
Sanyal was suffering from old age-related ailments, was admitted to a private hospital in Salt Lake area on 26 February. He was diagnosed with sepsis and multiple-organ failure. He died on 22 March 2022.

Former advocate general Bimal Chatterjee described Sanyal as a perfect gentleman of high moral values and integrity and a repository of knowledge.
