= Bartaman =

Indian newspaper

Bartaman বর্তমান

- Front page of 20 January 2009
- Type: Daily newspaper
- Format: Broadsheet
- Owner: Bartaman Pvt. Ltd
- Editor: Himangshu Sinha
- Founded: December 1984; 41 years ago
- Language: Bengali
- Headquarters: 6, J.B.S. Haldane Avenue, Kolkata-700105, India, 0336622 0330
- Country: India
- Circulation: 635,296 Daily (as of December 2019)
- Website: bartamanpatrika.com

Bartaman Patrika (Bengali: বর্তমান) is an Indian Bengali daily newspaper published from Kolkata, West Bengal, India, by Bartaman Pvt. Ltd. Apart from the Kolkata edition, the newspaper has three other simultaneous editions, published daily from three major towns of West Bengal: Siliguri, Bardhaman, and Midnapore. Bartaman is the second-most widely circulated Bengali newspaper in West Bengal after Anandabazar Patrika.

== History ==
The newspaper was founded on 7 December 1984 by Barun Sengupta, a former Anandabazar Patrika journalist. Sengupta died on 19 June 2008 at Kolkata.

During the Left Front regime, Bartaman Patrika was known for his staunch anti-communist and anti-establishment views. However, they have been loyal supporter to the present Bengal Government after 2011 Elections. Since April 2002, Bartaman Patrika has published an online version and in the year of 2006 Bartaman launched its Mobile App version. Also in 2022 Bartaman published Hindi daily named Bartaman Patrika.

== Bartaman Group ==
- Bartaman: A Bengali daily newspaper.
- Bartaman Patrika: One of the emerging Hindi daily in eastern India.
- Saptahik Bartaman: A Bengali weekly family magazine.
- Sukhi Grihakon: A Bengali women's lifestyle magazine.
- Sarir o Sastha: A Bengali health and wellness magazine.

== Competition ==
Bartaman's main competitor is Anandabazar Patrika, published since 1922. Bartaman holds second position after Anandabazar Patrika in West Bengal, by readership and circulation; its daily circulation is roughly about 60% of that of Anandabazar Patrika.
