= Arindam Chakrabarti =

Indian philosopher

Arindam Chakrabarti is an Indian philosopher who is a professor of philosophy at Ashoka University, India. He is the disciple of Sri Sri Sitaramdas Omkarnath. He earned his B.A. and M.A. degrees from the University of Calcutta in 1976 and 1978, respectively. He completed DPhil at Oxford University in 1982, under the supervision of Sir Peter Strawson and Michael Dummett.

== Selected publications ==
- Realisms Interlinked: Objects, Subjects and Other Subjects (24 chapters Monograph)—Bloomsbury, London, published 2019.
- The Book of Questions: An Introduction to Indian Philosophical Analysis—Penguin Books, India. 2018.
- Bloomsbury Research Handbook of Indian Aesthetics and Philosophy of Art, 2017.
- Comparative Philosophy without Borders: Essays in Fusion Philosophy, co-edited with Ralph Weber, 2015, Bloomsbury-Continuum, London, UK.
- Engaged Emancipation: New Essays on Yogavāsiṣtha, Co-edited with Christopher Chapple, State University of New York Press, 2014.
- Mahābhārata Now: Narrative, Aesthetics, Ethics (Co-edited with Shibaji Bandyopadhyaya), Routledge India, and Indian Institute of Advanced Study, Shimla, 2013.
- Apoha: Buddhist Nominalism and Human Cognition (Co-edited with Mark Siderits and Tom Tillemans), Columbia University Press, New York, 2011.
- Universals, Concepts, and Qualities: New Essays on the Meaning of Predicates, Ashgate Publishing, UK, 2006, Co-edited with Sir Peter Strawson.
- Denying Existence (Book in the Synthese Library Series), Kluwer Academic Publishers, Dordrecht/Boston, 1997.
- Epistemology, Meaning and Metaphysics After Matilal (edited anthology), Indian Institute of Advanced Studies, Studies in the Humanities Series Vol. II, 1996.
- Knowing from Words (Co-edited with Bimal Matilal), Kluwer Academic Publishers, Synthese Library Series, 1993.
