= Sunanda Sikdar =

Indian writer and memoirist (born 1951)

Sunanda Sikdar (born 1951) is an Indian writer and memoirist of Bengali origin. She was born after the partition of India in 1947, in the village of Digpait in East Pakistan, (now Bangladesh) from where her family migrated to Kolkata in India in the 1950s.

Her award-winning memoir Doyamoyeer Kotha was published in 2008, and received enormous critical and popular acclaim. The essayist Prasanta Chakravarty wrote:

"In Bangla literature, the greatest success story in recent times has been a post-partition memoir: Dayamayeer Katha (Dayamayee’s Tale), Sunanda Sikdar’s maiden work. Upon its arrival in January 2008, it received both critical and popular acclaim and in no time traversed the distance from being a cult hit to becoming an instant classic."

The book received the Ananda Puroshkar and Penguin India has released an English translation under the title A Life Long Ago. In 2010, an extract was also published as a part of Penguin's annual anthology, First Proof: The Penguin Book Of New Writing From India 6.
