= Joy Goswami =

Indian-Bengali poet (born 1954)

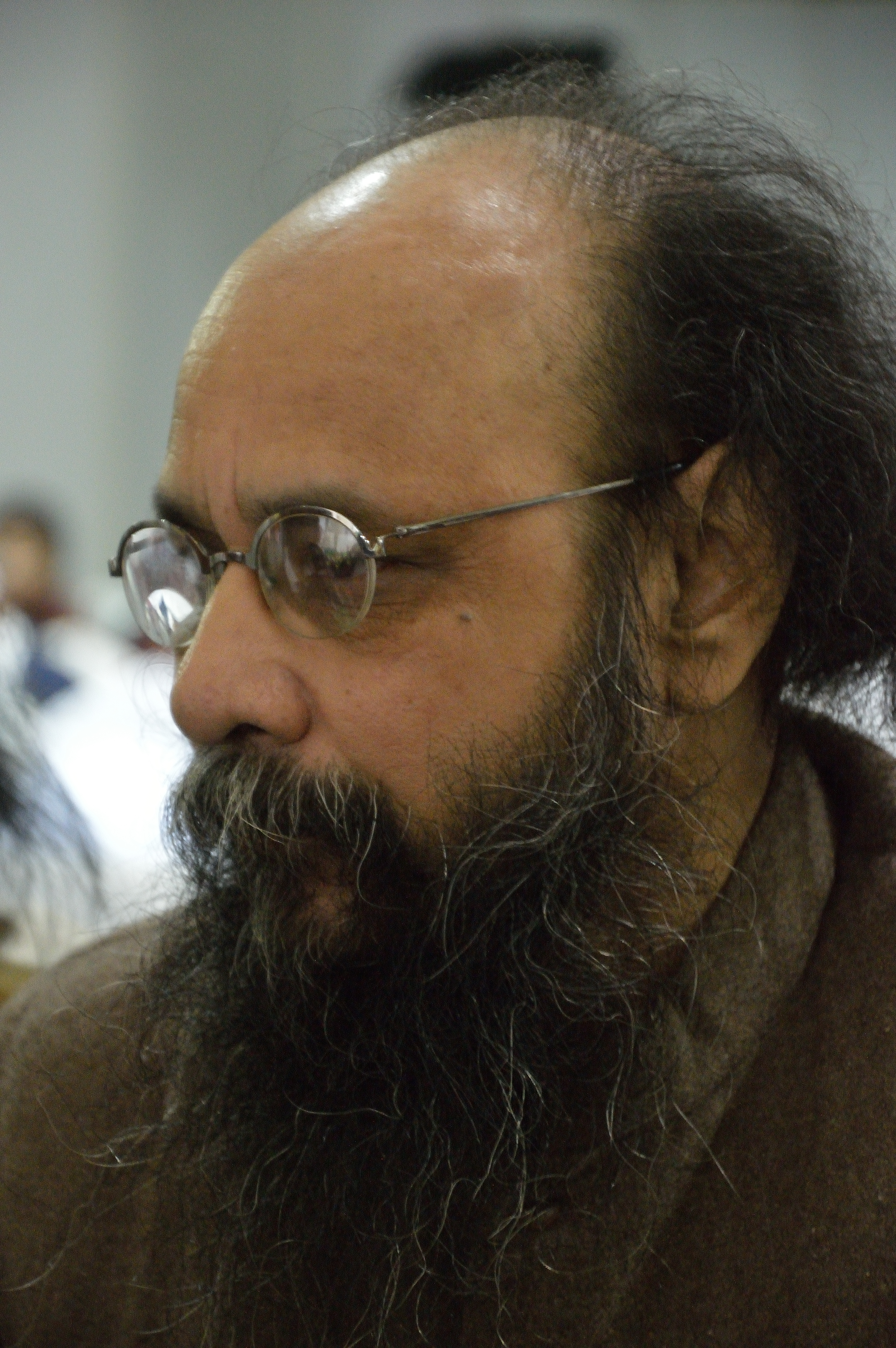
- Born: 10 November 1954 (age 71); Kolkata, West Bengal, India
- Occupation: Poet • novelist • short story writer
- Notable work: Pagali Tomar Sange; Jara Brishtite Bhijechhilo; Ghumiyechho, Jhaupata?; Sanjhbatir Rupkathara (Sanjhbati's Dreams)
- Spouse: Kaberi Goswami
- Children: 2
- Awards: Sahitya Akademi Award; Ananda Puraskar

Joy Goswami (/dʒɔe̯ ɡoʃwami/ goh-SHWAH-mee; born 10 November 1954) is an Indian poet, novelist, and short story writer. Goswami writes in Bengali and is widely considered as one of the most important poets in the post-Jibanananda Das era of Bengali poetry. His work addresses ordinary lives, marriage struggles, relationships with women, and the act of writing. He is lauded for his linguistically inventive poetry, its semi-abstract imagery, and strong lyrical appeal.

Goswami’s work is acclaimed in Bengal and India but remains obscure abroad, despite some translations by the 1981 Nobel laureate Roald Hoffmann. His poetry collections, short stories and novels have won several awards, including two Ananda Puraskar, the 1997 Paschimbanga Bangla Akademi Award for Bajra Bidyut Bharti Khata, the 2000 Sahitya Akademi Award for his poetry collection Pagali Tomar Sange (Crazy girl, with you), the 2012 Banga Bibhushan, the 2017 Moortidevi Award for Du Dondo Phowara Matro

In 1976, he joined Desh as a staff writer and later served as the magazine's poetry editor until leaving for Sangbad Pratidin in 2007. In addition to his literary works, his interests include aphorisms on art, theatre, Indian classical music, letters, and cricket.

== Biography ==
=== Family and early years ===
Joy Goswami was born on November 10, 1954, in Kolkata. Shortly after his birth, his family moved to Ranaghat, a town beside the Churni River in Nadia. His father, Madhu Goswami, was a well-known freedom fighter in the area. His mother, Sabita Goswami, worked as a school teacher. At the age of eight, he lost his father and was raised by his mother. Joy attended Ranaghat High School but dropped out from his courses in class 11.

=== Early writing ===
As a quiet kid, Joy kept a journal. One day, his brother found it and read his poems out loud to friends, humiliating him. He decided to stop writing but later changed his mind. To protect his thoughts, he wrote in a way that would confuse anyone who tried to read them. He said, “There was this simultaneous process of trying to give vent to my thoughts as well as an attitude of trying to hide what I was trying to express. That is what I would call the birth of metaphor.” Thus at 13, he wrote his first poem about the ceiling fan in his room.

His poem was first published at 19 in three magazines: Simanta Sikha, Paddokhep, and Homsikha. For the next 15–16 years, he wrote extensively for little magazines.

=== Career ===
His first poetry collection, Christmas o Sheeter Sonnetguchcho, was published in 1976 with only eight poems. He financed the publication with 145 INR, borrowed from his mother. His first poem in Desh appeared in 1976. In 1978, he again relied on his mother's support to publish his second book, Pratnjiv. His third collection, Aleya Hrod, was published in 1981 after poet Shankha Ghosh helped him find a publisher.

After thirty years in Ranaghat, he returned to Kolkata where he has continued to live ever since.

In 2001, he joined the International Writing Program at the University of Iowa, sponsored by the U.S. Department of State.

In a review for Anandabazar Patrika, Bhaskar Chakraborty praised Joy Goswami’s second poetry collection, Pratnajeev, writing, “Most poems in this collection are long, each masterful in its form. [...] His words pour like a fountain, erasing the boundaries of time—at times imagining a world millions of years ahead, at others capturing the mysteries of the present. His themes are sweeping, filled with haunting imagery—scorched earth, fear, and an unexpected cast of lovers, ghosts, and witches.”

His mother died in 1984. He has received the Anita-Sunil Basu Award from the Bangla Academy, Govt of W.B. the prestigious Ananda Purashkar in 1989 for Ghumiyechho, Jhaupata? (Have you slept, pine leaf?) and the Sahitya Akademi Award, 2000 for his anthology Pagali tomara sange (With you, O crazy girl). He possesses a great deal of admiration for Mamata Bandyopadhyay and openly extends his support for her, for which he has also been criticised.

In 1976, he joined Desh as a staff writer and later served as the magazine's poetry editor. In his role, he brought diverse poets into the fold of the Ananda Bazar Patrika group, and bridged the gap between alternative literary circles and a wider middle-class readership in the 1990s.

After leaving Desh, he became a staff writer at Sangbad Pratidin, where he wrote a Sunday column on poetry criticism. He was laid off from the position in 2019. After knowing about his condition, the state CM Mamata Banerjee appointed him in a state-funded institution.

In 2024, Goswami said he'd quit publishing poems but keep writing.

== Works ==
=== Poems ===
==== Malatibala Balika Vidyalaya (Malatibala Girls' School) ====
The second poem from Aaj Jodi Amake Jiges Koro (If You Ask Me Today) is a 32-line monologue that follows a woman reminiscing her teenage love for Benimadhob—who never noticed her and was already engaged. The poem explores Bengali society’s subtle prejudice against dark-skinned, lower-middle-class people. It is noted for its musicality, which is difficult to preserve in translation. In 1996, Samir Chattopadhyay and Lopamudra Mitra adapted it into a widely popular song, now available on YouTube. Some of the lines are also frequently alluded to in literature and media.

=== Short stories ===
==== Mallar Jekhane Name ====
Joy Goswami's best-known short stories include Mallar Jekhane Name (Where Mallar Descends). "Mallar," or "Malhar" is a Hindustani classical raga linked to heavy rains.

Set in the 1990s, the story follows a middle-aged poet and a college girl who meets him daily on his commute. A fervent admirer, she bombards him with questions about his works, making the introverted poet uneasy as it draws curious stares from fellow passengers. The poet never gets angry at her—because he doesn’t know how. At times, something close to anger stirs within him. But he swallows it.

The story unfolds in three parts. In the first, they converse on his way to work. In the second, the poet, lost in thought, reflects on his life—his relationships, a clash with a political figure at a poetry summit, his sexuality, his writing—and finds solace in the raga, Mallar. In the third part, on a train to a literary summit, the girl confesses to writing him a letter she never sent, calling it an imaginary conversation. She keeps ticket stubs from their meetings, which he finds absurd. She asks him to read poems at the summit from her favorite book of his. She won’t stop insisting.

Then, all of a sudden, the poet imagines Mallar descending. Outside, the sun blazes, and the train paces, but the world around him fades into a night sky sealed with heavy rain. He tries to resist, but he cannot. He imagines the earth’s heartbeat rising from the deepest trench—a deep, pounding rhythm.

And the girl asks, "You'll read it, won’t you? Please say you will."

The poet, unable to control his rage, gets up on his feet. Blood flickers in his eyes. His hands, his legs, tremble violently. And he wails: "Say one more word, and I’ll tear your tongue out! Where were you when I was twenty-five? Where were you?!"

== Political views ==
Joy Goswami has consistently raised his voice against state brutalities, genocide, and weapons of mass destructions. After India's second nuclear test in May 1998—coincidentally on the anniversary of his mother's death 14 years earlier—he wrote the poem Ma Nishad, published in Desh. The title references Valmiki’s first shloka, "mā niṣāda pratiṣṭhā…," spoken after he witnessed a hunter kill a male crane while it was mating.

Since the 2002 Gujarat riots, he has been a vocal critic of the Modi government and its Hindu nationalist agenda. One of his poems, written in the aftermath of the Gujarat riots, includes these lines: "Uṭ chalechhe mukhṭi tule — uṭ. Kī bolchhe se? Gujrat riot broke out...," (Note: Bengali: উট চলেছে মুখটি তুলে— উট। কী বলছে সে? Gujrat riot broke out...) (lit. 'The camel walks, head held high—camel. What does it say? Gujarat riot broke out...'). The final word (uṭ, pronounced /uʈ/, which means "camel") in the first sentence, borrowed from a children's rhyme, alliterates with the English word "out."

Following the 2007 Nandigram-incident, he publicly condemned the Left Front government and published the poetry collection Shasoker Proti (For The Oppressor). He joined protests alongside prominent writers, singers, actors, and journalists. In several essays, he also criticized Sunil Gangopadhyay, who had close ties to then-chief minister Buddhadeb Bhattacharya, for supporting the administration.

On March 21, 2022, AITC leader Bhadu Sheikh was murdered at the Bogtui intersection in Rampurhat, Birbhum. That night, a riot broke out, resulting in the deaths of eight people who were burned alive. In response, Goswami published Dagdha (দগ্ধ), a collection of eight poems. Though he did not explicitly criticize the ruling government, he concluded the book saying, "This collection of poems is the helpless grief of the child, the mother who could not know in her lifetime which group has the right to live or die."

== Writing style ==
Joy Goswami has been writing poetry for half a century on a wide range of topics—from the human mind, desires, and details of life to the very essence of human existence, as well as nuclear weapon tests and atomic theory. He has experimented with different forms and structures, causing his style to vary widely over the years, and some critics have compared it to that of Rabindranath Tagore. Yet, he says he has yet to find a definitive language that truly expresses his thoughts.

== In popular culture ==
- In Shob Charitro Kalponik (2009), Joy Goswami appears reading poems he wrote for the film at director Rituparno Ghosh's request, who was also editor of Robbar, a supplement of Sangbad Pratidin, at the time.

== Selected works ==
=== Poetry collections ===
- Christmas o Sheeter Sonnetguchchho (1976)
- Pratnajiv
- Aleya Hrod (1981)
- Unmader Pathokromo (1986)
- Bhutumbhogoban (1988)
- Ghumiyechho, Jhaupata? (1989)
- Aj Jadi Amake Jigyes Karo
- Santansantati
- Moutat Maheswar
- Sakalbelar Kobi
- Mrito Nagorir Raja
- Bhaloti Basibo
- Phulgachhe Ki Dhulo (2011)
- Atmiyoswajan (2011)
- Shanti (2023) ( Barnik Prokashon)

=== Novels ===
- Jara Brishtite Bhijechhilo
- Saanjhbatir Roopkathara
- Sab Andhakar Fulgach
- Bhenge Jawar Pore

== Publication list ==
Published works by Jaya Gosvāmī (which is how his name is transliterated in the Library's catalog and Name Authority File) listed in the Library of Congress Catalog:

- Bajrabidyu_t-bharti khātā. Kalakātā: Ānanda Pābali'sārsa, 1995. ISBN 81-7215-399-6
- Bishāda. Kalakātā: Ānanda Pābali'sārsa, 1998. ISBN 81-7215-786-X
- Hrdaye premera ´sīrsha. Kalakātā: Ānanda Pābali'sārsa, 1994. ISBN 81-7215-293-0
- Jaga_tabāri. Kalakātā: Ānanda Pābali'sārsa, 2000. ISBN 81-7756-107-3
- Kabitāsamgraha. Kalakātā: Ānanda Pābali'sārsa, <1997–2001>
- Mā nishāda. Kalakātā: Ānanda Pābali'sārsa, 1999. ISBN 81-7215-946-3
- Manoramera upanyāsa. Kalakātā : Ānanda Pābali'sārsa, 1994. ISBN 81-7215-222-1
- Oh svapna! Kalakātā: Ānanda Pābali'sārsa, 1996. ISBN 81-7215-512-3
- Pāgalī, tomāra sange. Kalakātā: Ānanda Pābali'sārsa, 1994. ISBN 81-7215-290-6
- Pātāra po'sāka. Kalakātā: Ānanda Pābali'sārsa, 1997. ISBN 81-7215-672-3
- Pretapurusha o anupama kathā. Kalakātā: Ānanda, 2004. ISBN 81-7756-402-1
- Raudrachāyāra samkalana. Kalakātā: Ānanda Pābali'sārsa, 1998. ISBN 81-7215-821-1
- Sam'sodhana bā kātākuti. Kalakātā: Ānanda Pābali'sārsa, 2001. ISBN 81-7756-124-3
- Sānjhabātira rūpakathārā. Kalakātā: Ānanda Pābali'sārsa, 1998. ISBN 81-7215-839-4
- Seisaba seyālara. Kalakātā: Ānanda Pābali'sārsa, 1994. ISBN 81-7215-316-3
- Shanjhbati's dreams = Shanjhbatir rupkathara. New Delhi: Srishti Publishers & Distributors, 2004. ISBN 81-88575-43-7
- Suranga o pratirakshā. Kalakātā: Ānanda Pābali'sārsa, 1995. ISBN 81-7215-420-8
- Sūrya-porā chāi. Kalakātā: Ānanda Pābali'sārsa, 1999. ISBN 81-7215-773-8
- Yārā brshtite bhijechila. Kalakātā: Ānanda Pābali'sārsa, 1998. ISBN 81-7215-566-2

== Awards and honours ==
- Anita-Sunil Basu Award from Bangla Akademi, W.B. Govt. (2017)
- Ananda Puraskar (1990), (1998)
- Sahitya Akademi Award (2000)
- Bharatiya Bhasha Parishad Lifetime Achievement Award (2011)
- Rachana Samagra Purashkar (2011)
- Banga Bibhushan by West Bengal Government (2012)
- D.Litt. by University of Calcutta (2015)
- D.Litt by North Bengal University (2015)
- D.Litt. by Kalyani University (2017)
- Sera Bangali by ABP Group (2017)
- Moortidevi Award (2017)
