= Bibhutibhushan Mukhopadhyay =

Indian Bengali-language author

- Born: 24 October 1894; Darbhanga, Bengal Presidency, British India
- Died: 30 July 1987 (aged 92); Darbhanga, Bihar, India
- Occupations: Poet, novelist, playwright, essayist
- Writing career
- Language: Bengali, English

Bibhutibhushan Mukhopadhyay (24 October 1894 – 30 July 1987) was an Indian Bengali language author.

== Works ==
=== Novels ===
- Nilanguriyo, later adapted for film
- Swargadapi Gariyasee
- Tomrai Bharasa
- Uttarayan
- Kanchan Mulya, later adapted for film
- Dolgovinder Karacha
- Rup Holo Abhisap
- Nayan Bou
- Panka Pallab
- Kadam

=== The Ranu short stories ===
- Ranur Prothom Vagh
- Ranur Ditio Vagh
- Ranur Tritio Vagh
- Ranur Kothamala

=== Other short stories ===
- Hathe Khari
- Rel Ranga
- Barjatri
- Basar
- Kokil Deke Chhilo

=== Travelogues ===
- Kushi Panganer Chithi
- Duar Hote Adure
- Ajatar Joyjatra

=== Natak ===
- Barjatri, later adapted for film and television
- Tansil

=== Children's books ===
- Ponur Chithi
- Kilasher Patrani
- Hese Jao (poetry)
