= Saptahik Bartaman =

- Company: Bartaman Pvt. Ltd.
- Website: Official website

Saptahik Bartaman (সাপ্তাহিক বর্তমান) is a Bengali language weekly magazine published by Bartaman Pvt. Ltd. (the publisher of the newspaper Bartaman) from Kolkata, India. It had a circulation of 1,48,378, in January–June, 2011.

It is the largest Bengali family magazine in Eastern India. This weekly magazine is available in print and can also be accessed online through their official app. It is part of the Bartaman Group which has evolved into one of the most influential media houses in Eastern India. Saptahik Bartaman can be accessed in the Bartaman official website.
