= Lozowick =

Lozowick is a surname. Notable people with the surname include:

- Lee Lozowick, American spiritual teacher, author, poet, lyricist and singer
- Louis Lozowick, American painter and printmaker
- Yaacov Lozowick, German-born Israeli historian and writer

== See also ==
- Lodowick, a surname
