= Bhaba Pagla =

- Bhaba Pagla

Background information
- Born: Bhabendramahan Ray Chaudhury; October 17, 1902; Amta, Bengal Province, British India (now in Bangladesh)
- Died: February 26, 1984 (aged 81) Kalna, West Bengal, India

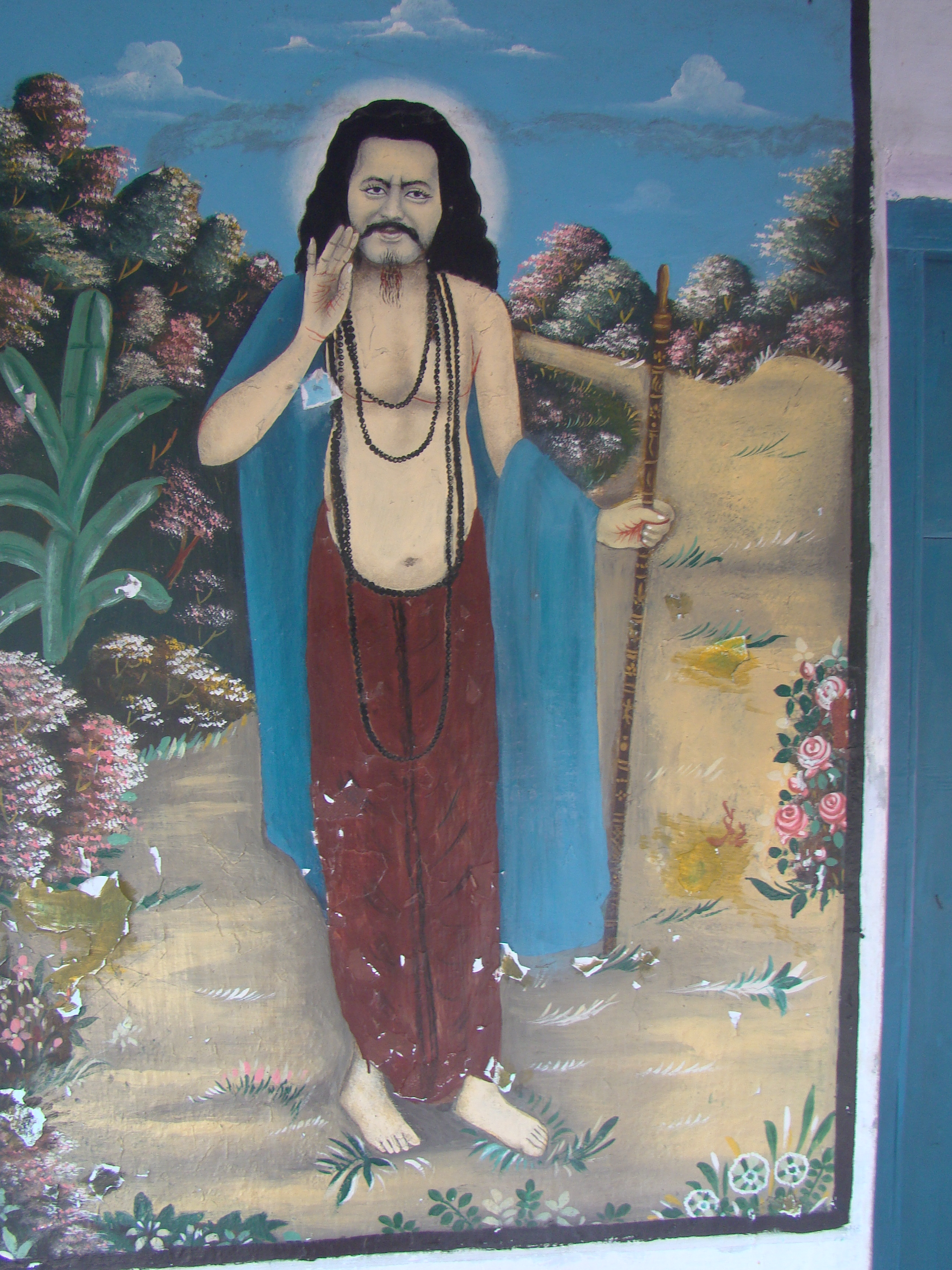
A wall painting of Bhaba Pagla.

Bhabendramohan Ray Chaudhury (17 October 1902 – 26 February 1984), better known as Bhaba Pagla, was a Bengali lyricist, composer, and a devotee of goddess Kali. He is known for his contributions to Bengali folk music. His conventional education did not exceed the primary school level but his creations, mostly lyrics, had been sunk into a deep inner meaning and located in a high thought though common words used for cultural expression. The lyrics also had been composed by him with easy harmony to entertain the masses.

== Biography ==
Bhaba Pagla was born as Bhabendramahan Ray Chaudhury around 1903 at Amta in Dhaka District in the Bengal Province of British India (now in Dhamrai Upazila, Dhaka, Bangladesh). He came of a respectable family of small land owners of the Saha caste, and the surname of the family was Chowdhury, though Bhaba achieve his own title Pagla, the mad, a mad by the love for God. Bhaba's parents, Gajendra Mohan Chowdhury and his wife Gayasundari Devi had developed themselves highly in the way of devotion and had been blessed by many gurus and sadhus.

Bhaba Pagla had been leading a family life with Smt. Shaibalini Devi and he had been the father of three children.

Bhaba was dead set against publicizing his mystic power; he used to say "If people get to know about me, I'll become cow dung!".

Beyond his spiritual influence, Bhaba Pagla is more famous for his contribution in Bengali folk culture. The songs, he composed, are renowned all around of Bengal, India and Bangladesh. Many devotional songs of him have been published in records by a research group affiliated with France Government and his works are now subject to interest of many research scholar. University of Kalyani, in West Bengal, India, has included "Bhaba Paglar Gan" (Song of Bhaba Pagla) into their academic curriculum and in Bangladesh Bangla Academy of Dhaka's publication department brought out a biography of Bhabapagla "Jiban o Gan" by name.

Those who heard him perform praised him as a talented harmonium and behala (a type of violin) player.

== Songs ==
Bhaba Pagla composed thousands of charming folk songs, which are mostly performed by Bauls, but also by Shyamasangit singers. Bhaba Pagla's songs are referred to by his devotees as spiritual songs for self-realization (sadhana sangit). The themes and the styles covered by his songs are numerous, drawing from various popular and religious repertoires of his time. His lyrics are profound and metaphorical, but also witty and humorous.

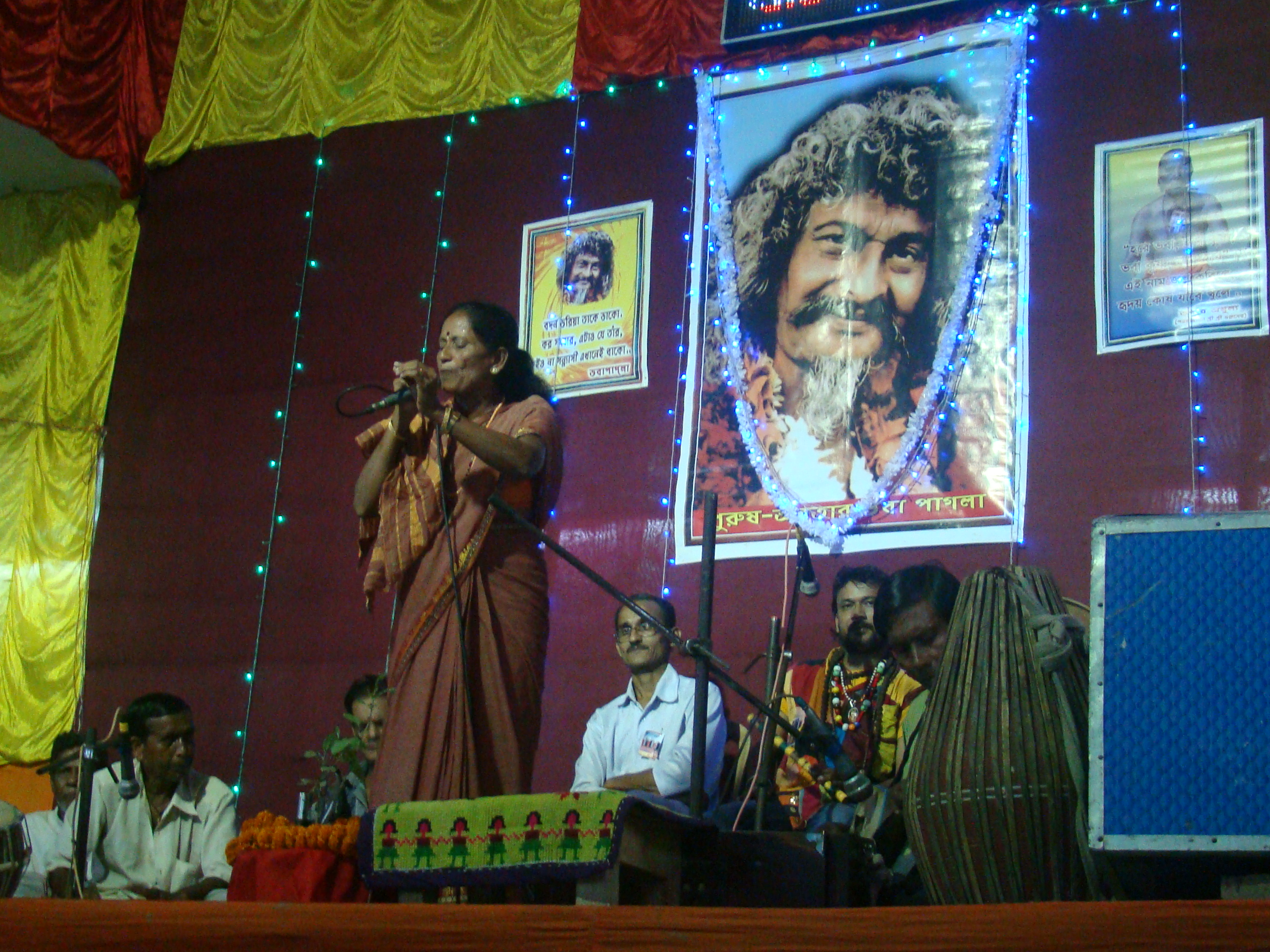
A woman singer at a festival dedicated to Bhaba Pagla (mahasammelan) in Nadia (West Bengal). Photo by Carola Lorea.

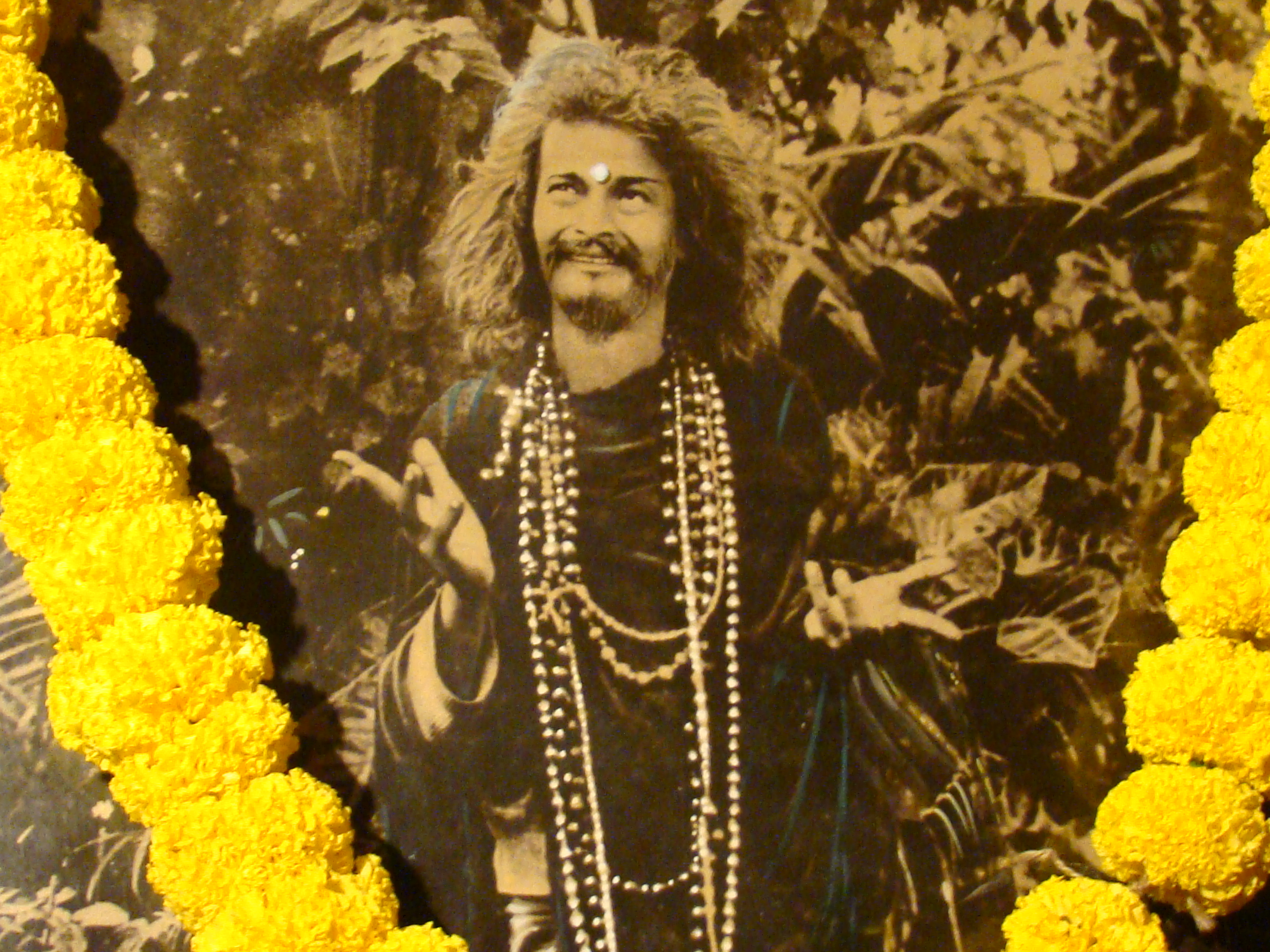
A picture of Bhaba Pagla worshipped by his devotees.
