= Baul =

Group of mystic, syncretic minstrels of Bengal

Baul songs
- UNESCO Intangible Cultural Heritage
- Country: Bangladesh
- Reference: 00107
- Region: Asia and the Pacific

Inscription history
- Inscription: 2008 (3rd session)
- List: Representative

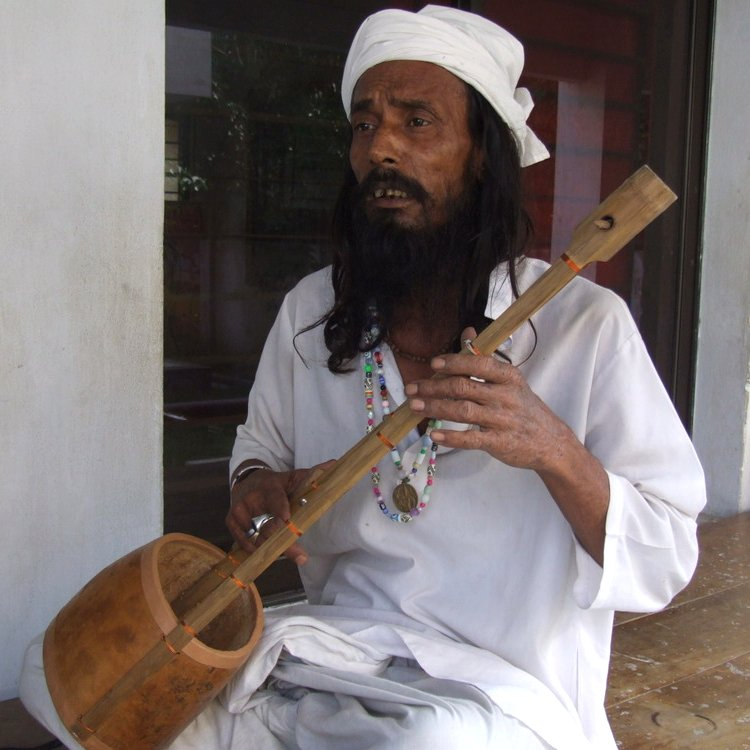
A Baul from Lalon Shah's shrine in Kushtia, Bangladesh

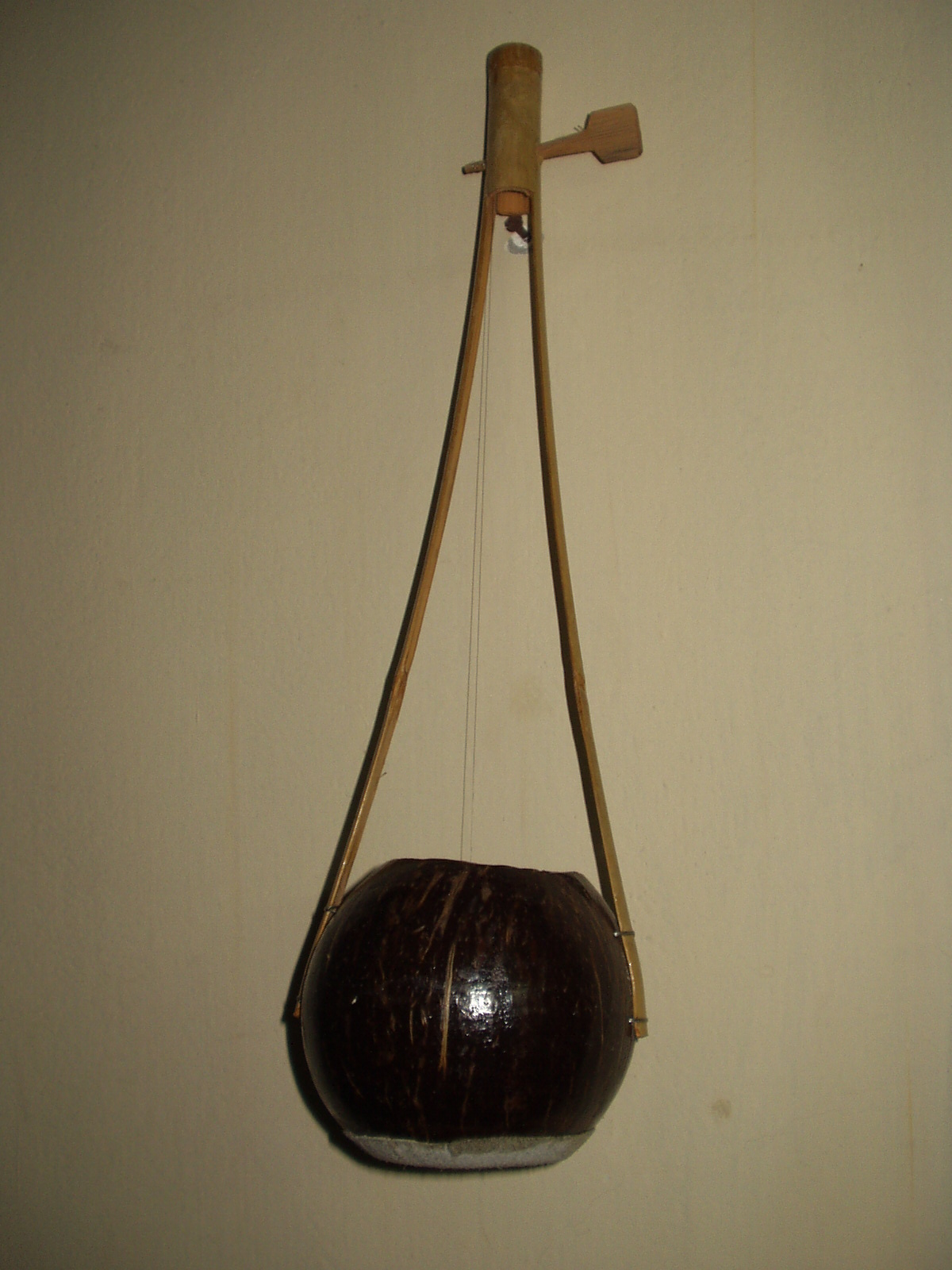
Ektara, a common musical instrument of Bauls

The Baul (Bengali: বাউল) are a group of mystic minstrels of mixed elements of Sufism and Vaishnava Sahajiya from different parts of Bangladesh and the Indian states of West Bengal, Tripura and Assam's Barak Valley and Meghalaya. Bauls constitute both a syncretic religious sect of troubadours and a musical tradition. Bauls are a very heterogeneous group, with many sects, but their membership mainly consists of Sufi Bengali Muslims and Gaudiya Vaishnava Bengali Hindus. They can often be identified by their distinctive clothes and musical instruments. Lalon Shah is regarded as the most celebrated Baul saint in history.

Although Bauls constitute only a small fraction of the Bengali population, their influence on the culture of Bengal is considerable. In 2005, the "Baul tradition of Bangladesh" was included in the list of Masterpieces of the Oral and Intangible Heritage of Humanity by UNESCO.

== Etymology ==
The origin of the word Baul is debated. A recent scholarly research suggests that the Bauls may be descendants of a specific branch of Sufism referred to as ba'al. A common view is that it may be derived either from the Sanskrit word vātula, which means "mad, crazy", or from vyākula, which means "impatiently eager, upset". According to philosopher Shashibhusan Dasgupta, both of these derivations are consistent with the modern sense of the word, "inspired people with an ecstatic eagerness for a spiritual life where one can realise one's union with the eternal Beloved". Another theory is that it comes from the Persian word Aul.

== History ==
The origin of Bauls is not known exactly, but the word "Baul" has appeared in Bengali texts as old as the 15th century. The word is found in the Chaitanya Bhagavata of Vrindavana Dasa Thakura as well as in the Chaitanya Charitamrita of Krishnadasa Kaviraja. Some scholars maintain that it is not clear when the word took its sectarian significance, as opposed to being a synonym for the word madcap, agitated. Bauls are a part of the culture of rural Bengal. Many attempts have been made to ascertain the origin of Bauls but there is wide disagreement among scholars. But they agree that no founders have been acknowledged either by Bauls themselves or others. Bauls are divided into several named groups, each following a named Muslim or Hindu guru. Besides, there are other communities who later identified or affiliated themselves with Bauls, like Darbesi, Nera and two sub-sects of Kartabhajas — Aul and Sai. The Bauls themselves attribute their lack of historical records to their reluctance to leave traces behind. Dr. Jeanne Openshaw writes that the music of the Bauls appears to have been passed down entirely in oral form until the end of the 19th century, when it was first transcribed by outside observers.

Ahmed Sharif says about history of Baulism in his book "Baul Tattva", "A mixed sect has been formed by the cooperation of Brahmanism, Shaivism and Buddhist Sahajiya sects, called Nathpanth. Their goal is physical pursuits. (Nathpanth and Sahajiya) people of these two sects were once converted to Islam and Vaishnavism, but since it was not possible to abandon the old beliefs and reforms, they continued to practice religion in the old traditions even under the auspices of Islam and Vaishnavism, as a result of which the Baulism, a combination of Hindus and Muslims, emerged. Therefore, there is no obstacle in accepting the Muslim vows of a Hindu guru or the Hindu vows of a Muslim guru. They have broken the barriers of Brahmanism and Shariat Islam and have paved the way according to their own mind. That is why they say, "Kali Krishna is God, there is no barrier to any name. Say Kali Krishna is God."

There are two classes of Bauls: ascetic Bauls who reject family life and Bauls who live with their families. Ascetic Bauls renounce family life and society and survive on alms. They have no fixed dwelling place, but move from one akhda to another. Bangladeshi men wear white lungis and long, white tunics; women wear white saris. They carry jholas, shoulder bags for alms. They do not beget or rear children. They are treated as jyante mara. Women dedicated to the service of ascetics, are known as sevadasis "service slaves". A male Baul can have one sevadasi, who is associated with him in the act of devotion. Until 1976 the district of Kushtia had 252 ascetic Bauls. In 1982–83 the number rose to 905; in 2000, they numbered about 5000.

Those who choose family life, live with their spouse, children and relations in a secluded part of a village. They do not mix freely with other members of the community. Unlike ascetic Bauls, their rituals are less strict. In order to become Bauls, they recite some mystic verses and observe certain rituals.

In Bangladesh, Bauls mostly dress in white which symbolises purity. The bauls from India dress colourfully in orange and red and have a somewhat different way of getting together. There is a big yearly gathering called Jaydeb Mela, taking place in Januari in Kenduli, near Bolpur, which attract bauls and followers in large numbers.

== Concepts and practices ==
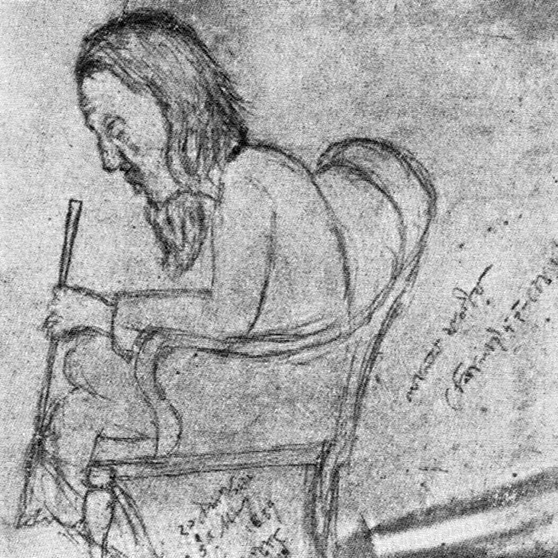
Lalon, the most celebrated Baul saint in history, by Jyotirindranath Tagore, 1889

=== Musical asceticism ===
Baul music celebrates celestial love, but does this in very earthy terms, as in declarations of love by the Baul for his bosh-tomi or lifemate. With such a liberal interpretation of love, it is only natural that Baul devotional music transcends religion and some of the most famous baul composers, such as Lalon, criticised the superficiality of religious divisions:

Everyone asks: "Lalan, what's your religion in this world?"

Lalan answers: "How does religion look?
I've never laid eyes on it.
Some wear malas [Hindu rosaries] around their necks,
some tasbis [Muslim rosaries], and so people say
they've got different religions.

But do you bear the sign of your religion when you come or when you go?"

=== Physical esotericism ===
Their religion is based on an expression of the body (deho sādhanā), and an expression of the mind (mana sādhanā). Some of their rituals are kept hidden from outsiders, as they might be thought to be repulsive or hedonistic. Bauls concentrate much of their mystic energies on the four body fluids, on the nine-doors (openings of the body), on prakṛiti as "energy of nature" or "primal motive force", and on breath sādhanā.

Women were given the highest honor in Tantra as well as Baulism. One of the Panca-tattvas or Pañcamakāras (Madya-mamsa-matsya-mudra-maithuna) that is considered essential for Tantric sadhana is the lady, whom they used to call ma (mother), which they also adrresses their wives as. Some Tantras claim that even a prostitute might be a Tantric devotee's companion (Sadhana-sangini). A person's mother is their best teacher. Because a Sadhaka's (male practitioner) success in Sadhana is solely dependent on his Sadhana-Sangini (female consort), she is seen as superior to the man in terms of Sadhana. Instead of calling their spouses strī (wife), many Baul males used to refer to them as sangini (companion). While some Vaishnava Bauls engage in regular social weddings with a Hindu priest and a dowry, others exchange garlands under the supervision and blessings of a guru, a practice known as mālācandan or mālābadal. Since this kind of exchange is performed in front of one's guru, whom pupils are required to obey, some Bauls believed it to be more binding than a typical social wedding. However, there is considerable disagreement on the durability of Baul weddings performed in this manner. As a practicing partner (sadhana sangini), fornication or other's wife (Parakia) is preferable for Vaishnavi Bauls. However, Muslim Bauls typically make his own wife (Shwakia) as partner.

=== Impuristic occultism ===
According to Bauls, using narcotics promotes achievement, happiness at work, and mental clarity. For nearly the same reason, this nation's saints, monks, Bauls, and fakirs use marijuana, siddhi (cannabis flower), and bhang as the primary supplements for their sadhana and meditate while intoxicated. They also use narcotics like hashish and cocaine.

To get rid of all diseases, they make a substance called Prembhaja/Premvaja /Prem Bhoja(প্রেমভাজা/প্রেমভোজ) (love fry/love feast) by mixing four substances called by them four moons (চারি চন্দ্র, Chari Chandra) (Sarala Chandra or simplistic moons (milk and semen), Garala Chand or venom moons (urine and menstrual blood), Rohini Chandra or ascending moons (Leukorrhea) and Mohini Chandra or seductress moons or Nij Chandra or self moon (barley doe and feces) and eat it in Rohini Yoga, which is frequently mentioned in Baul songs and Lalon songs. It is derived from the ritual called Panch Pavitra (पंचपवित्र, five holy (things)) of tantric community, also performed as Panchan Rasa (Five juice) in Sufi Fakir community. In another explanation, this practice is called as a form of "Gayatri Kriya" to achieve immortality.

== Music ==
Musical notes for Bangladesh's national anthem, Amar Sonar Bangla, which is based on Baul song Ami Kothay Pabo Tare

The music of the Bauls, Baul Sangeet, is a particular type of folk song. Their music represents a long heritage of preaching mysticism through songs in Bengal.

Bauls pour out their feelings in their songs but never bother to write them down. Theirs is essentially an oral tradition. It is said that Lalon Fakir (1774–1890), the greatest of all Bauls, continued to compose and sing songs for decades without ever stopping to correct them or put them on paper. It was only after his death that people thought of collecting and compiling his repertoire.

Their lyrics intertwine a deep sense of mysticism, a longing for oneness with the divine. An important part of their philosophy is "Deha tatta", a spirituality related to the body rather than the mind. They seek the divinity in human beings. Metaphysical topics are dwelt upon humbly and in simple words. They stress remaining unattached and unconsumed by the pleasures of life even while enjoying them. To them we are all a gift of divine power and the body is a temple, music being the path to connect to that power. A consistent part of Bauls' lyrics deals with body-centered practices that aim at controlling sexual desire. The esoteric knowledge of conception and contraception is revealed in the lyrics of the songs through an enigmatic language that needs to be decoded by the guru in order to be understood and experienced.

Gacher pata taka keno hoy na, Baul song performance at the Saturday haat, Sonajhuri, Birbhum.

Besides traditional motifs drawn from the rural everyday life, Baul songs have always been inclined to incorporate change and keep pace with social and economic innovations. For instance, modern Baul compositions discuss esoteric matters by using the terminology of modern, urban and technological lexicons, and it is not unusual to hear Baul refrains containing mobile phones, radio channels, football matches and television.

Bauls use a number of musical instruments: the most common is the ektara, a one-stringed "plucked drum" drone instrument, carved from the epicarp of a gourd, and made of bamboo and goatskin. Others include the dotara, a long-necked fretless lute (while the name literally means "two stringed" it usually has four metal strings) made of the wood of a jackfruit or neem tree; besides khamak, one-headed drum with a string attached to it which is plucked. The only difference from ektara is that no bamboo is used to stretch the string, which is held by one hand, while being plucked by another. Drums like the duggi, a small hand-held earthen drum, and dhol and khol; small cymbals called khartal and manjira, and the bamboo flute are also used. Ghungur and nupur are anklets with bells that ring while the person wearing them dances.

A Baul family played on stage in London for The Rolling Stones' Hyde Park concerts in 1971, '72 and '78 in front of thousands.

== Influence on Rabindranath Tagore ==
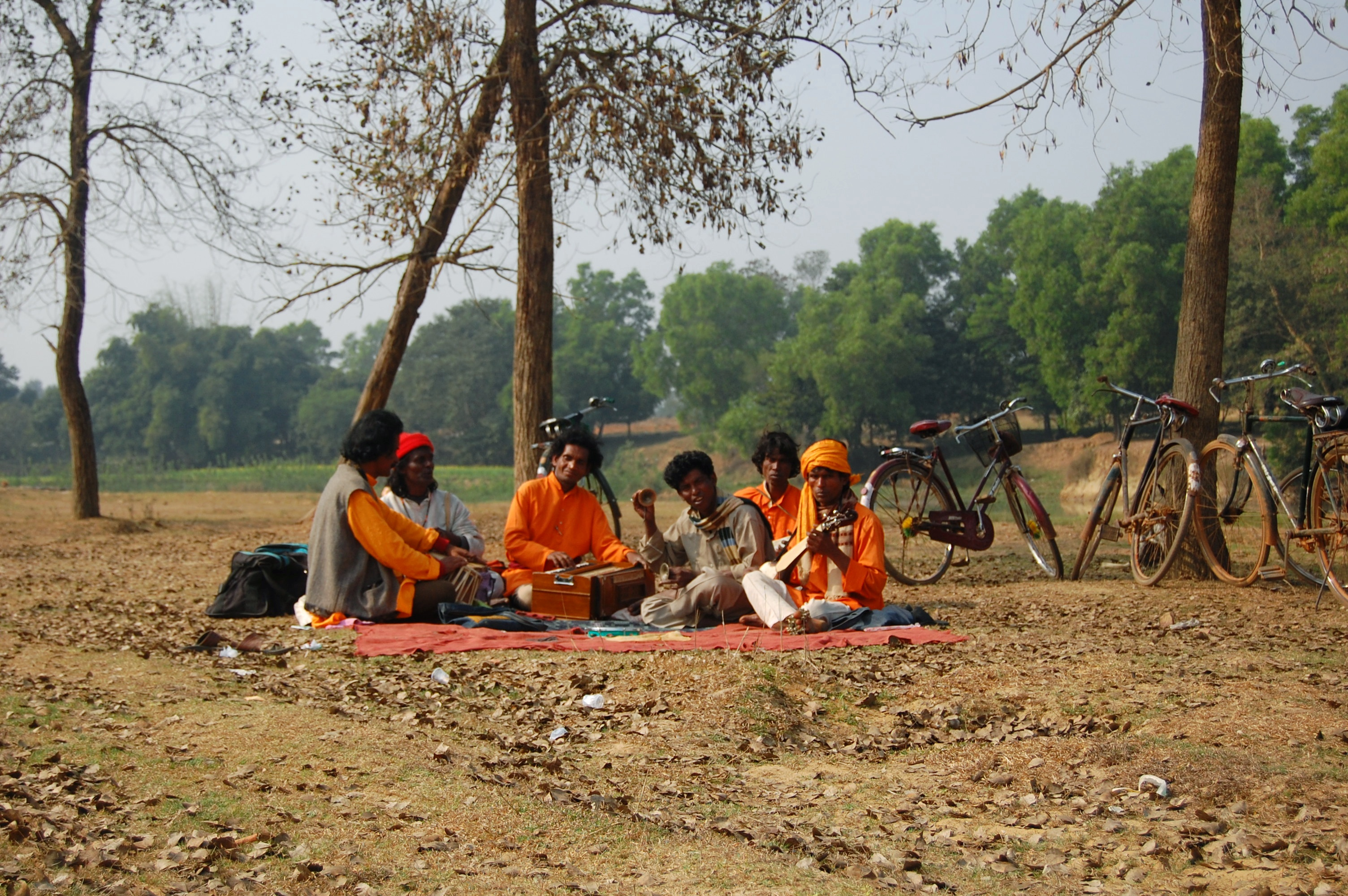
Baul singers performing Santiniketan, West Bengal, India

The songs of the Bauls and their lifestyle influenced a large part of Bengali culture, but nowhere did it leave its imprint more powerfully than on the work of Rabindranath Tagore, who talked of Bauls in a number of speeches in Europe in the 1930s. An essay based on these was compiled into his English book The Religion of Man:

The Bauls are an ancient group of wandering minstrels from Bengal, who believe in simplicity in life and love. They are similar to the Buddhists in their belief in a fulfillment which is reached by love's emancipating us from the dominance of self.

The below quotations are from Tagore's book "Creative Unity".

The following is a translation of the famous Baul song by Gagan Harkara: Ami kothai pabo tare, amar moner manush je re.

Where shall I meet him, the Man of my Heart?
He is lost to me and I seek him wandering from land to land.
I am listless for that moonrise of beauty,
which is to light my life,
which I long to see in the fullness of vision
in gladness of heart. [p.524]

The below extract is a translation of another song:

My longing is to meet you in play of love, my Lover;
But this longing is not only mine, but also yours.
For your lips can have their smile, and your flute
its music, only in your delight in my love;
and therefore you importunate, even as I am.

The poet proudly says: 'Your flute could not have its music of beauty if your delight were not in my love. Your power is great—and there I am not equal to you—but it lies even in me to make you smile and if you and I never meet, then this play of love remains incomplete.'

The great distinguished people of the world do not know that these beggars—deprived of education, honour and wealth—can, in the pride of their souls, look down upon them as the unfortunate ones who are left on the shore for their worldly uses but whose life ever misses the touch of the Lover's arms.

This feeling that man is not a mere casual visitor at the palace-gate of the world, but the invited guest whose presence is needed to give the royal banquet its sole meaning, is not confined to any particular sect in India.

A large tradition in medieval devotional poetry from Rajasthan and other parts of India also bear the same message of unity in celestial and romantic love and that divine love can be fulfilled only through its human beloved.

Tagore's own compositions were powerfully influenced by Baul ideology. His music also bears the stamp of many Baul tunes. Other Bengali poets, such as Kazi Nazrul Islam, have also been influenced by Baul music and its message of non-sectarian devotion through love.

The following well-known Rabindra Sangeet is heavily influenced by Baul theme:

amar praner manush achhe prane

tai here taye shokol khane
Achhe she noyōn-taray, alōk-dharay, tai na haraye--
ogo tai dekhi taye Jethay shethay
taka-i ami je dik-pane

The man of my heart dwells inside me.
Everywhere I look, it is he.
In my every sight, in the sparkle of light
Oh, I can never lose him--
Here, there and everywhere,

Wherever I turn, he is right there!

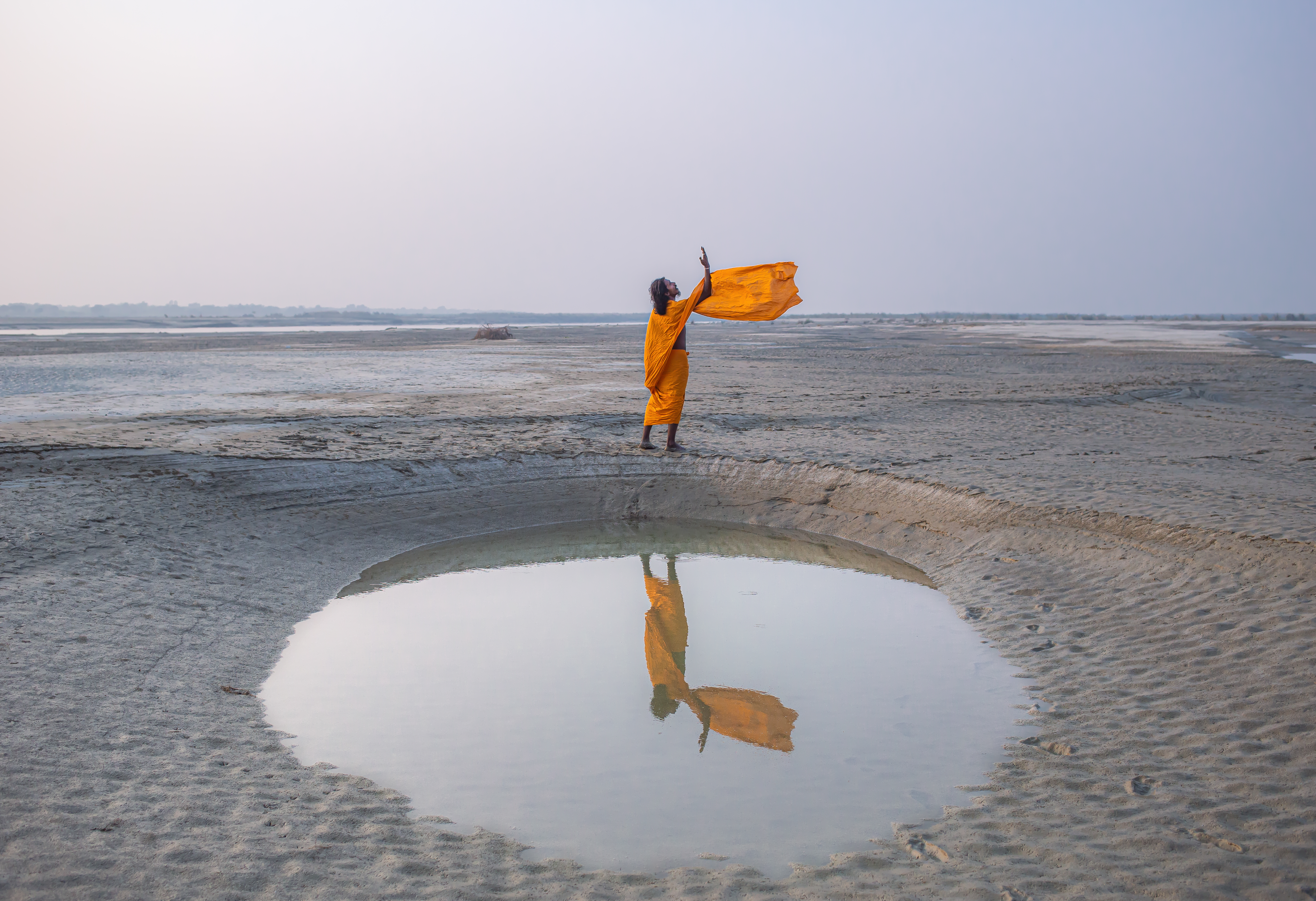
A Baul is singing in the middle of a field

All bāuls shared only one belief in common—that God is hidden within the heart of man and neither priest, prophet, nor the ritual of any organized religion will help one to find Him there. They felt that both temple and mosque block the path to truth; the search for God must be carried out individually and independently.

== Present status ==
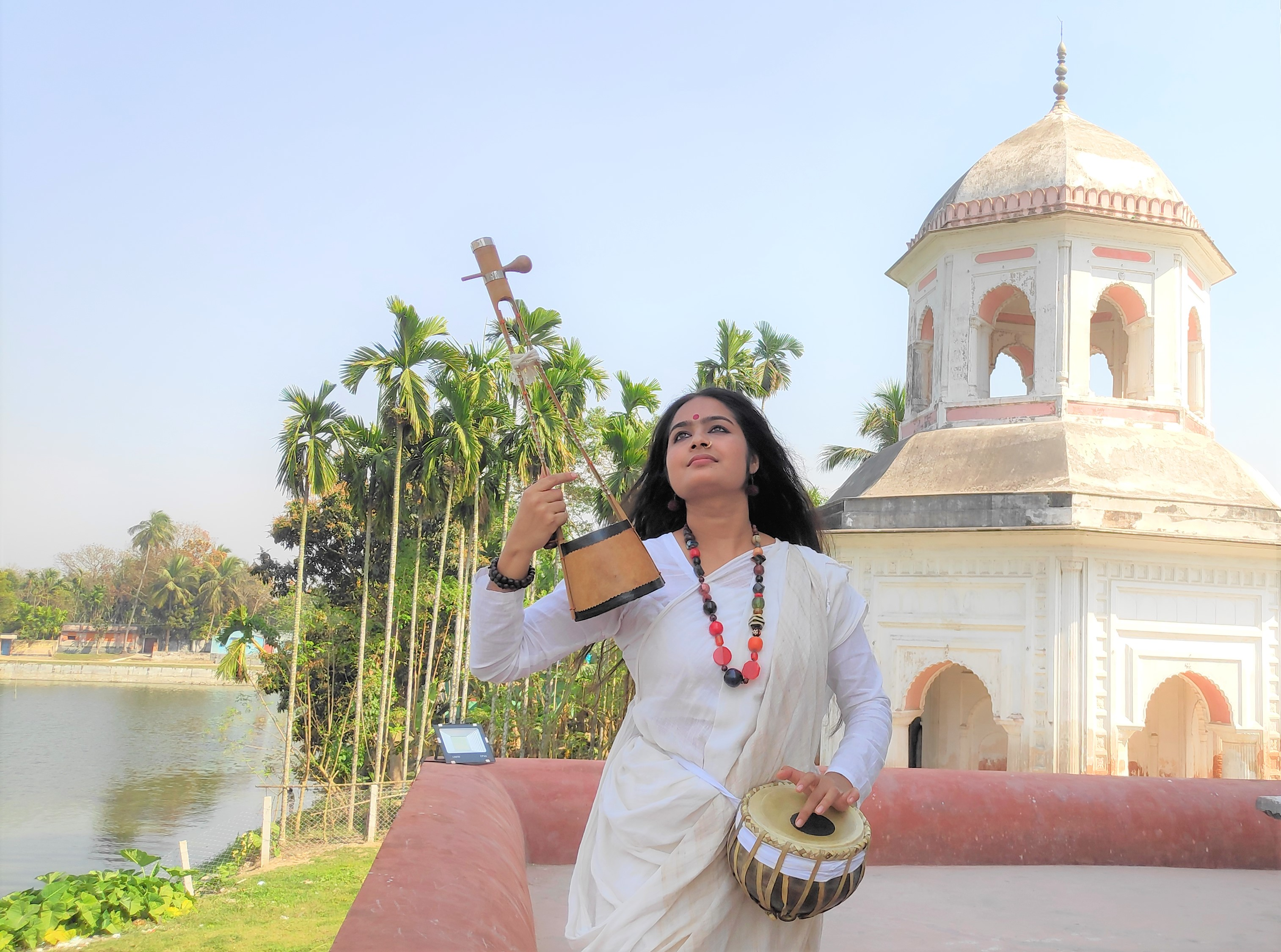
Baul Follower Sadhika Srijoni Tania singing with playing Dugi and Ektara.

Bauls are found in the country of Bangladesh and the Indian state of West Bengal and the eastern parts of Bihar and Jharkhand. The Baul movement was at its peak in the 19th and early 20th centuries, but even today one comes across the occasional Baul with his ektara (one-stringed musical instrument)

=== Bangladesh ===
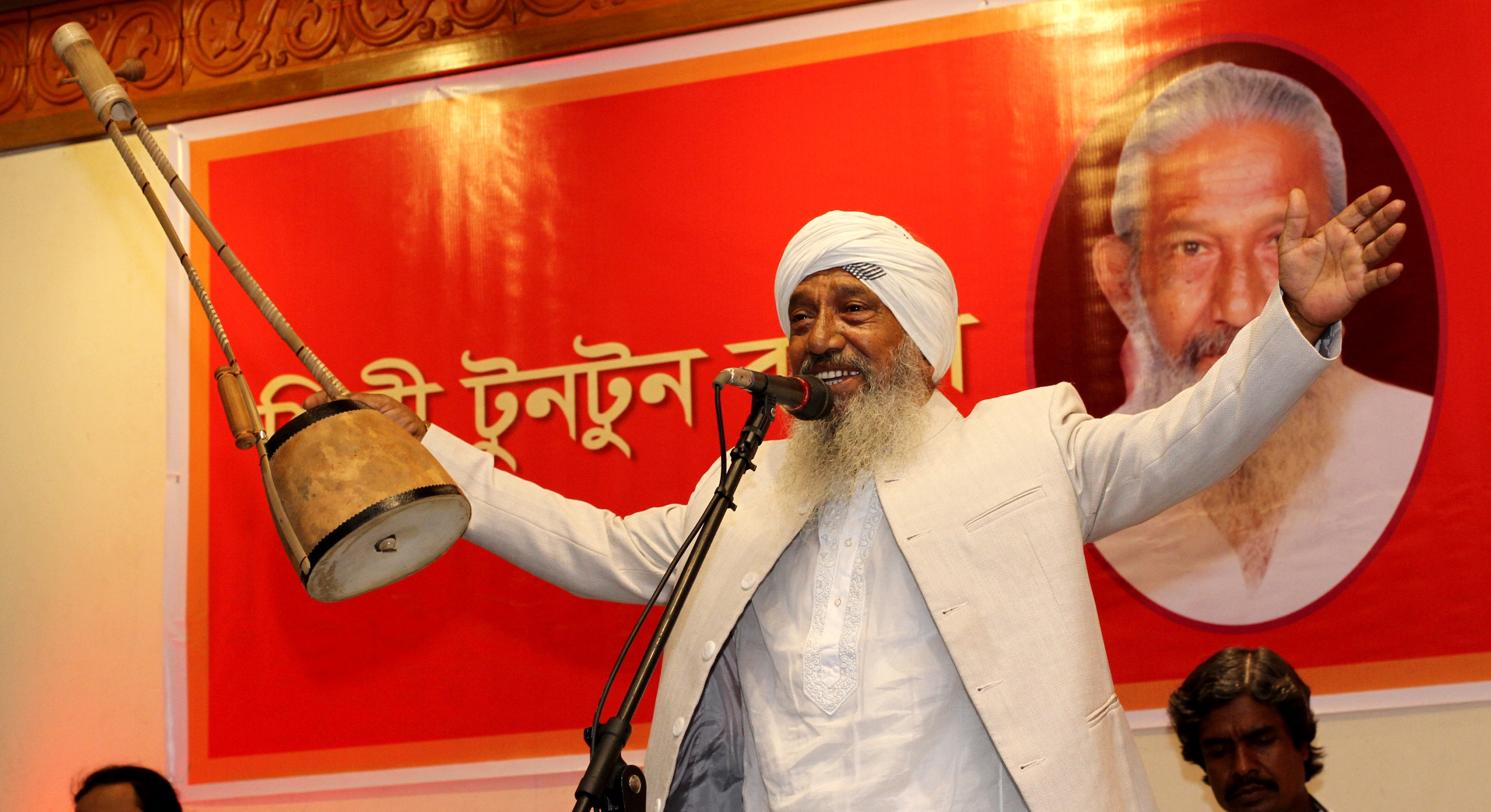
Tuntun Baul singing in Bangladesh National Museum in 2018

Every year, in the month of Falgun (February to March), "Lalon Smaran Utshab" (Lalon memorial festival) is held in the shrine of Lalon in Kushtia, Bangladesh, where bauls and devotees of Lalon from Bangladesh and overseas come to perform and highlight the mysticism of Lalon.

Palli Baul Samaj Unnayan Sangstha (PBSUS), a Bangladeshi organisation, has been working to uphold and preserve the 'baul' traditions and philosophy since 2000. The organisation often arranges programmes featuring folk songs for urban audiences.

Bangladesh Shilpakala Academy often organises national and international festivals and seminars, featuring the Baul music and the importance of preservation of Baul tradition.

At various times, Bauls have been targeted by Islamists due to their viewing of Bauls as apostates & their opposition to music.

Ahmed Sharif said, "In general, Muslim Bauls are semi-Muslims. They have increased the number of Muslims in Bangladesh. If the Sufi-Dervishes had not kept them semi-Muslims, so many people would not have been able to be directly initiated into the propagation of Sharia Islam. Since they were previously part of the by name Muslim community, it was possible to easily convert most of them to full Islam in the 19th and 20th centuries. Currently, there are about three lakh Bauls in Bangladesh. As a result of the Wahhabi-Faraizi and Ahl-e-Hadith movements, many Muslim Bauls returned to Sharia Islam in the 19th and 20th centuries, and similarly, under the influence of English education, Hindu Bauls also adopted Brahminical rites. Otherwise, the number of Bauls was not insignificant among the lower class Bengalis (meaning Dalits and Arzals) of Bengal, especially those of central, northern and West Bengal, in short, those beyond the Padma."

=== India ===
In the village of Jaydev Kenduli in Birbhum district of West Bengal, a Mela (fair) is organised in memory of the poet Jayadeva on the occasion of Makar Sankranti in the month of Poush. So many Bauls assemble for the mela that it is also referred to as "Baul Fair".

In the village of Shantiniketan in West Bengal during Poush Mela, numerous Bauls also come together to enthral people with their music.

Since 2006, an annual music show has been organised in Kolkata called "Baul Fakir Utsav". Bauls from several districts of Bengal as well as Bangladesh come to perform over a two-day period.

There are also the Western Bauls in America and Europe under the spiritual direction of Lee Lozowick, a student of Yogi Ramsuratkumar. Their music is quite different (rock /gospel/ blues) but the essence of the spiritual practices of the East is well maintained.

In Bangalore near Electronic City Dr. Shivshankar Bhattacharjee has started Boul Sammelon (Gathering of Bauls) on 7–9 April-2017 on the occasion of the inauguration of Sri Sri Kali Bari (Goodness Kali's Temple). First time it held in Bangalore to embrace the Boul culture. More than 50 Bouls participated and sang soulful songs.

Currently another version of Baul called the folk fusion also called baul rock is also greatly accepted by the audience, especially in West Bengal. Kartik das baul being a traditional folk singer, who has taken baul to different heights is being associated with folk fusion. This type of baul was brought into the world of music by Bolepur bluez.

Another popular Baul from West Bengal is Rina Das Baul from Bolpur. She, along with her troupe named Rangamatir Baul, had performed in several international functions like Urkult Festival in Sweden in 2017, Armor India festival in France in 2018 and Womex in at Porto, Portugal in 2021. Her music was reviewed by Simon Broughton in Songlines and, in 2019, American Grammy-nominated bluegrass Fiddler Casey Driessen collaborated with her on an album.

== Notable singers ==
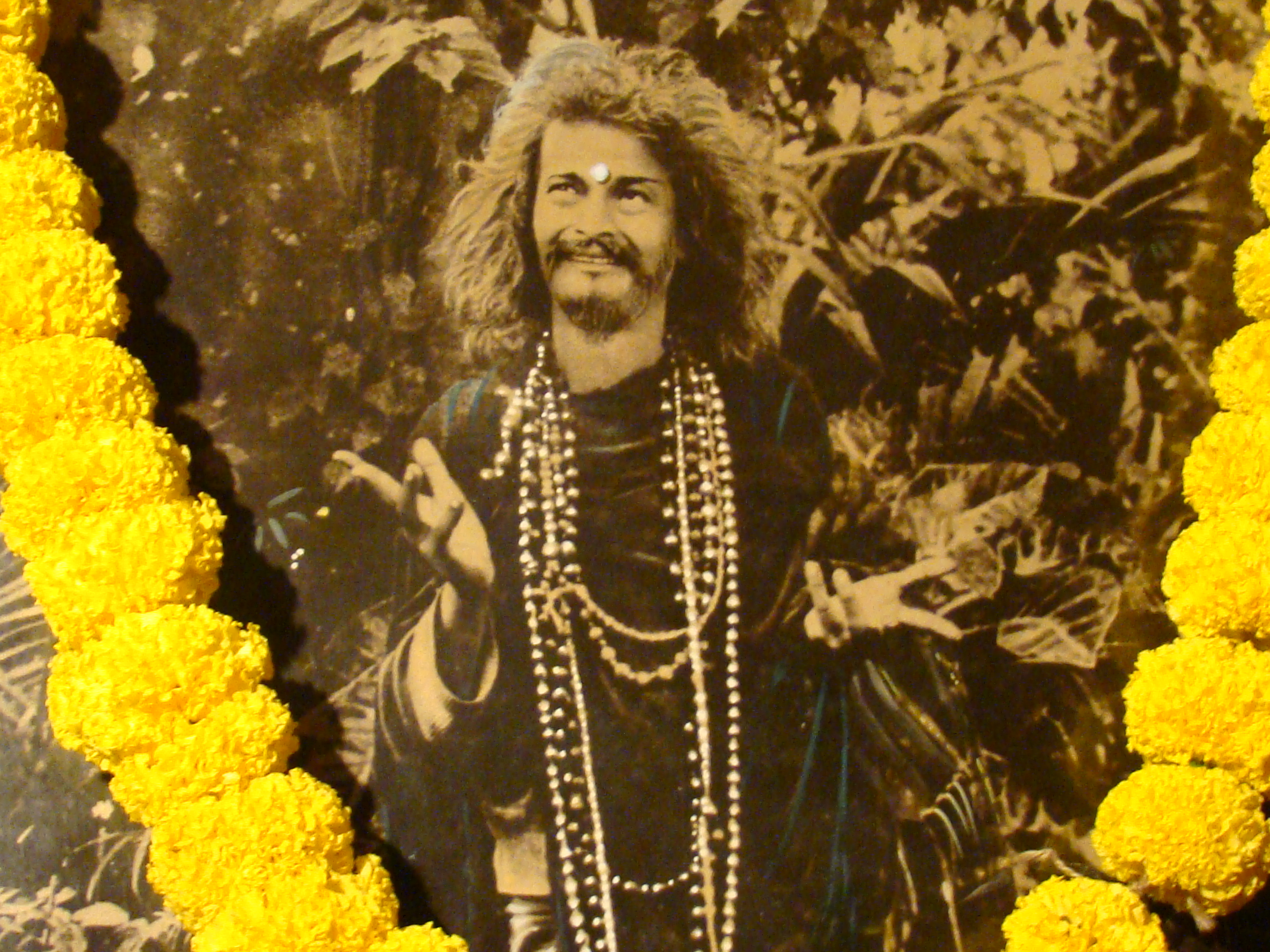
A picture of the saint-composer Bhaba Pagla, followed by his disciples in West Bengal and Bangladesh

Lalon also known as Fakir Lalon Shah, Lalon Shah, Lalon Fakir (Bengali: লালন; 17 October 1774 – 17 October 1890; Bengali: 1 Kartik 1179) was a prominent Bengali philosopher, Baul saint, mystic, songwriter, social reformer and thinker. Regarded as an icon of Bengali culture, he inspired and influenced many poets, social and religious thinkers including Rabindranath Tagore, Kazi Nazrul Islam, and Allen Ginsberg although he "rejected all distinctions of caste and creed". Widely celebrated as an epitome of religious tolerance, he was also accused of heresy during his lifetime and after his death. In his songs, Lalon envisioned a society where all religions and beliefs would stay in harmony. He founded the institute known as Lalon Akhrah in Cheuriya, about 2 kilometres (1.2 mi) from Kushtia railway station. His disciples dwell mostly in Bangladesh and West Bengal. Every year on the occasion of his death anniversary, thousands of his disciples and followers assemble at Lalon Akhrah, and pay homage to him through celebration and discussion of his songs and philosophy for three days.

Shah Abdul Karim (15 February 1916 – 12 September 2009) was a Bangladeshi Baul musician. Dubbed "Baul Samrat", he was awarded the Ekushey Padak in 2001 by the Government of Bangladesh. Some of his notable songs include Keno Piriti Baraila Re Bondhu, Murshid Dhono He Kemone Chinibo Tomare, Nao Banailo Banailo Re Kon Mestori, Ashi Bole Gelo Bondhu and Mon Mojale Ore Bawla Gaan. He referred to his compositions as Baul Gaan.

Bhaba Pagla (1902–1984) was a famous Indian saint-composer and an important guru from East Bengal. He has been a spiritual preceptor for many Bauls and his songs are very popular among Baul performers.

Purna Das Baul or Puran Das Baul, popularly known as Purna Das Baul Samrat, (born 18 March 1933) is an Indian musician and singer, in Baul tradition. Dr. Rajendra Prasad, first President of the modern state of India, acknowledged Purna Das as Baul Samrat in 1967. Purna Das has also appeared in numerous films, and was personally fêted by Mick Jagger in England, and by Bob Dylan who told Purna Das that he himself would be 'the Baul of America'. He appeared in the same concert with Dylan once, and is appearing on the cover of Dylan's album John Wesley Harding.

Lalon Band are Bengali folk, rock and fusion music band formed in Khulna, Bangladesh. They draw heavy influence from Lalon. They are led by Nigar Sultana Sumi, one of the most renowned Baul singers in Bangladesh and West Bengal.

== See also ==
- Music of Bangladesh
- Parvathy Baul
- Bangla (band)
- List of Intangible Cultural Heritage of Bangladesh

== Bibliography ==
- Bhattacharya, Baskar The Path of the Mystic Lover: Baul Songs of Passion and Ecstasy Inner Traditions, 1983
- Enamul Haq, Muhammad (1975), A history of Sufism in Bengal, Asiatic Society, Dhaka.
- Qureshi, Mahmud Shah (1977), Poems Mystiques Bengalis. Chants Bauls Unesco. Paris.
- Siddiqi, Ashraf (1977), Our Folklore Our Heritage, Dhaka.
- Karim, Anwarul (1980), The Bauls of Bangladesh. Lalon Academy, Kushtia.
- Mukherjee, Prithwindra (1981), Chants Caryâ du bengali ancien (édition bilingue), Le Calligraphe, Paris.
- Mukherjee, Prithwindra (1985), Bâul, les Fous de l'Absolu (édition trilingue), Ministère de la Culture/ Findakly, Paris
- Capwell, Charles (1986), The Music of the Bauls of Bengal. Kent State University Press, USA 1986. ISBN 0-87338-317-6.
- Dimock, Edward C. (1989), The Place of the Hidden Moon: Erotic Mysticism in the Vaisnava-Sahajiya Cult of Bengal, The University of Chicago Press, Chicago. ISBN 0-226-15237-5, ISBN 978-0-226-15237-0
- Bandyopadhyay, Pranab (1989), Bauls of Bengal. Firma KLM Pvt, Ltd., Calcutta.
- Sarkar, R. M. (1990), Bauls of Bengal. New Delhi.
- Brahma, Tripti (1990), Lalon : His Melodies. Calcutta.
- Gupta, Samir Das (2000), Songs of Lalon. Sahitya Prakash, Dhaka.
- Karim, Anwarul (2001), Rabindranath O Banglar Baul (in Bengali), Dhaka.
- Openshaw, Jeanne (2002). Seeking Bauls of Bengal. Cambridge University Press. ISBN 978-0-521-81125-5.
- Baul, Parvathy (2005). Song of the Great Soul: An Introduction to the Baul Path. Ekatara Baul Sangeetha Kalari.
- Capwell, Charles (2011), Sailing on the Sea of Love THE MUSIC OF THE BAULS OF BENGAL, The University of Chicago Press, Chicago. ISBN 978-0-85742-004-6
- Sen, Mimlu (2009), Baulsphere, Random House, ISBN 978-81-8400-055-9
- Sen, Mimlu (2010), The Honey Gatherers, Rider Books, ISBN 978-1-84604-189-1
- Knight, Lisa I. (2011). Contradictory Lives: Baul Women in India and Bangladesh. Oxford University Press. ISBN 978-0-19-977354-1.
- Mukherjee, Prithwindra (2014), Le Spontané: chants Caryâ et Bâul, Editions Almora, Paris.
