= Yogi Ramsuratkumar =

Indian saint and mystic

Bhagawan Sri Yogi Ramsuratkumar

Personal life
- Born: 1 December 1918 Nardara Ballia U.P.
- Died: 20 February 2001 (aged 82)
- Website: Yogi Ramsuratkumar Ashram - Official Website

Religious life
- Religion: Hinduism

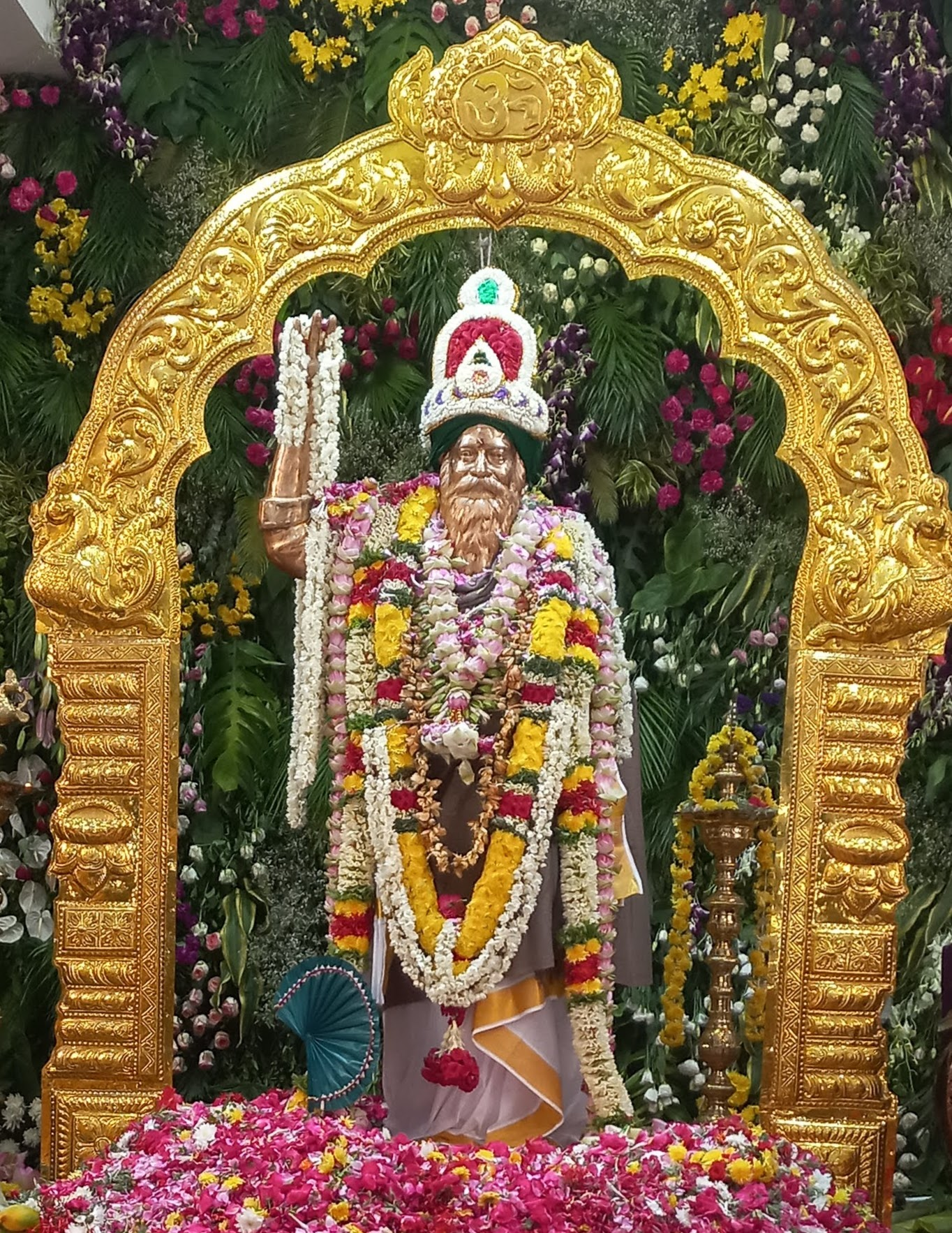
Yogi Ramsuratkumar, the Godchild, Tiruvannamalai

Yogi Ramsuratkumar (1 December 1918 – 20 February 2001), affectionately referred to as 'Swamiji' and ‘Bhagawan’, was an Indian saint and mystic. He was also referred to as "Visiri Samiyar" (Saint with hand fan) and spent most of his post-enlightenment period in Tiruvannamalai, a small town in Tamil Nadu which is known for attracting spiritual seekers worldwide and has had a continuous lineage of enlightened souls. He, addressing himself as "this beggar", acknowledges the contribution of three of the well known saints of his time in his evolution to enlightenment, saying "this beggar has three fathers". These individuals were Sri Aurobindo of Pondichery, the founder of Integral yoga, Ramana Maharshi of Tiruvannamalai - one of the "spiritual supermen" of his time, and Swami Ramdas of Kanhangad, Kerala.

== Pre-enlightenment life ==
Yogi Ramsuratkumar (birth name: Ramsurat Kunwar) was born in a village Naradara, Lalganj, Ballia-277216 (U. P.) near Kashi on 1 December 1918, to a humble couple - Sri Ramdat Kunwar and Smt Kusum Devi. In his childhood, he loved very much to meet the yogis and monks. He was befriended by a number of holy men who built their huts on the Ganges shore or simply wandered nearby. During this time, he met Sri Sri 1008 Sri Khapadia Baba, a mystic monk, who advised him to go to the south and be a seeker.

He grew up as a Grihasta (Gṛhastha: Gṛha- means home, family or house; -sth means devoted to, occupied with being in) but eventually, the tugs of spirituality in his heart took over. In search of his "guru", he visited and spent time in the ashrams of both Sri Aurobindo and Ramana Maharishi. He later moved to Kerala at the ashram of Swami Ramdas. In his own assessment, Sri Aurobindo gave him Jnana (Jñāna : knowledge), Sri Ramana Maharshi blessed him with tapas (spiritual meditations) and Swami Ramdas gave him the nectar of Bhakti (devotion). Swami Ramdas initiated him into the holy mantra (a powerful spiritual phrase ): " Om Sri Ram Jai Ram Jai Jai Ram ", by pronouncing it thrice in his ears. Yogi Ramsuratkumar often refers to this instance as his "death", since from this moment on, his ego no longer existed, and he had a profound spiritual experience.

== Post-enlightenment life ==
Yogiji travelled across the country from 1952 to 1959. Not much is known about the exact whereabouts of the yogi in this period. He finally reached Tiruvannamalai in the Southern India in 1959. He was a "hidden" saint during this early period, with not too many individuals realizing that this "beggar" was someone who would bring riches to the lives of countless many. After his guru, Swami Ramdas initiated him with the holy mantra, he also asked him to live a beggar's life. Yogi Ramsuratkumar willingly accepted and from then on he called himself a "beggar". He was seen near the Temple chariot, at the corners of the Road, under the trees of the Temple. As more and more people started acknowledging the divine presence in him, Swamiji then began living in a small house in Sannadhi Street beneath the Temple. He continued to bless the devotees who thronged at thousands to his house at the Sannadhi Street. At a point, his devotees became too many to be handled in a small house and the devotees wished him to have an Ashram which he gently accepted after much persuasion for the sake of his devotees. The Yogi Ramsuratkumar Ashram is constructed at Agrahara collai with a total area of 3.5 Acres.

== Message ==
Bhagawan Yogi Ramsuratkumar used to say, “I can only say that, whatever exists is one life. Unity: nothing is separate, nothing isolated. This beggar is related to the Sun, to the Moon, to the Infinite Cosmos. This beggar is not limited to this body. All of us who are present here are not separate, isolated. They are part of me. Myself in all these forms. You see this Champak Tree, you see this Amla Tree, they are all part of my Life. They are not separate. They are not isolated. Myself in all these forms with all these names. I am the Total. I am the Whole, Absolute, Indivisible, Eternal. Limitless Life, Infinite Life. We are all one together, united, perfect unity in Father. Father in all. That’s all I can say.”

He also said, "My Father has given a new Name, fresh Name to the world - 'YOGI RAMSURATKUMAR'. It is not the name of this beggar. It is the name of Father. Call upon this name - 'Yogi Ramsuratkumar' and my Father will come for your help at once".

Yogi Ramsuratkumar
Yogi Ramsuratkumar
Yogi Ramsuratkumar
Jaya Guru Raya

== Gallery ==
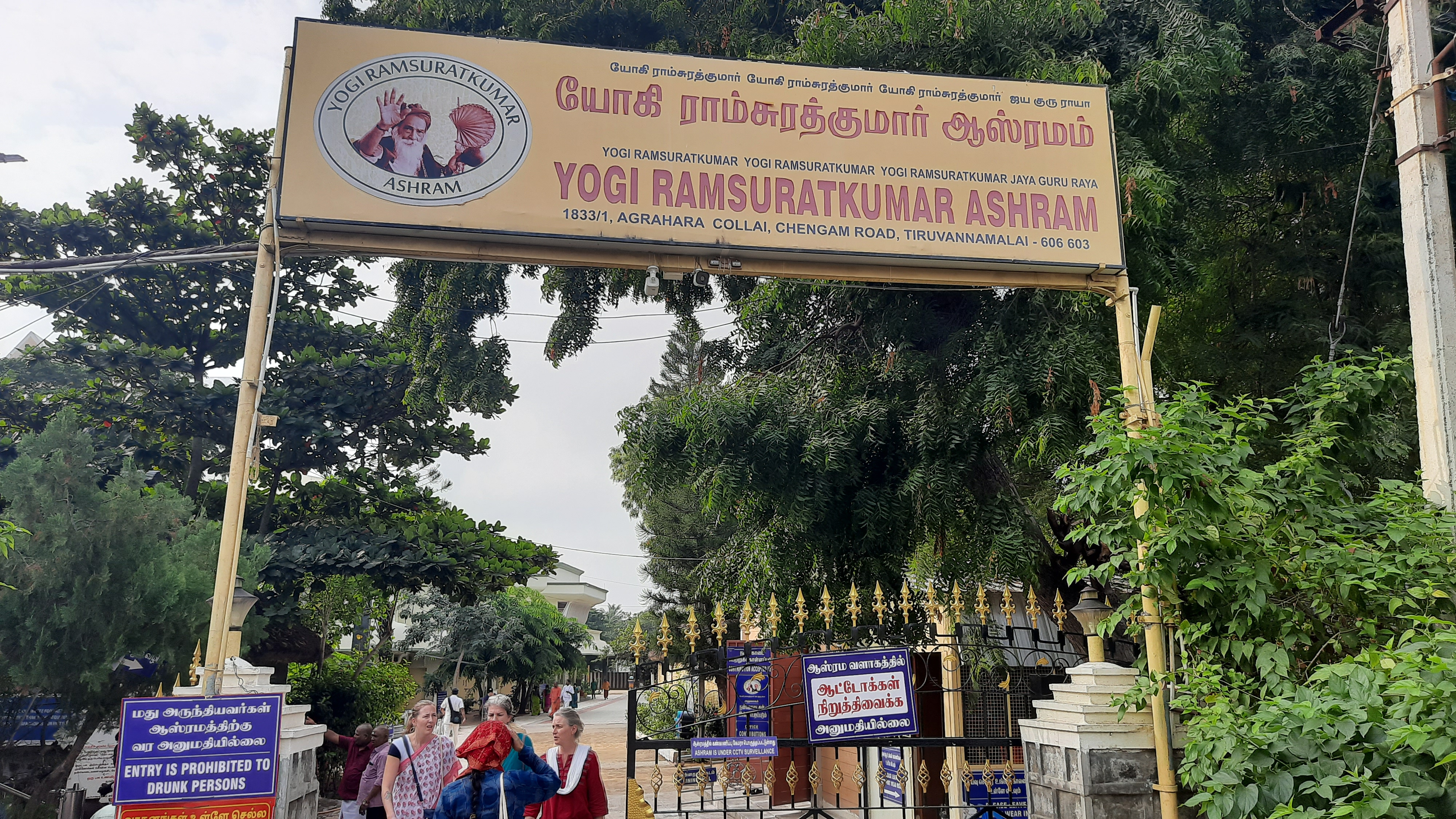
Yogi Ramsuratkumar Ashram main entrance

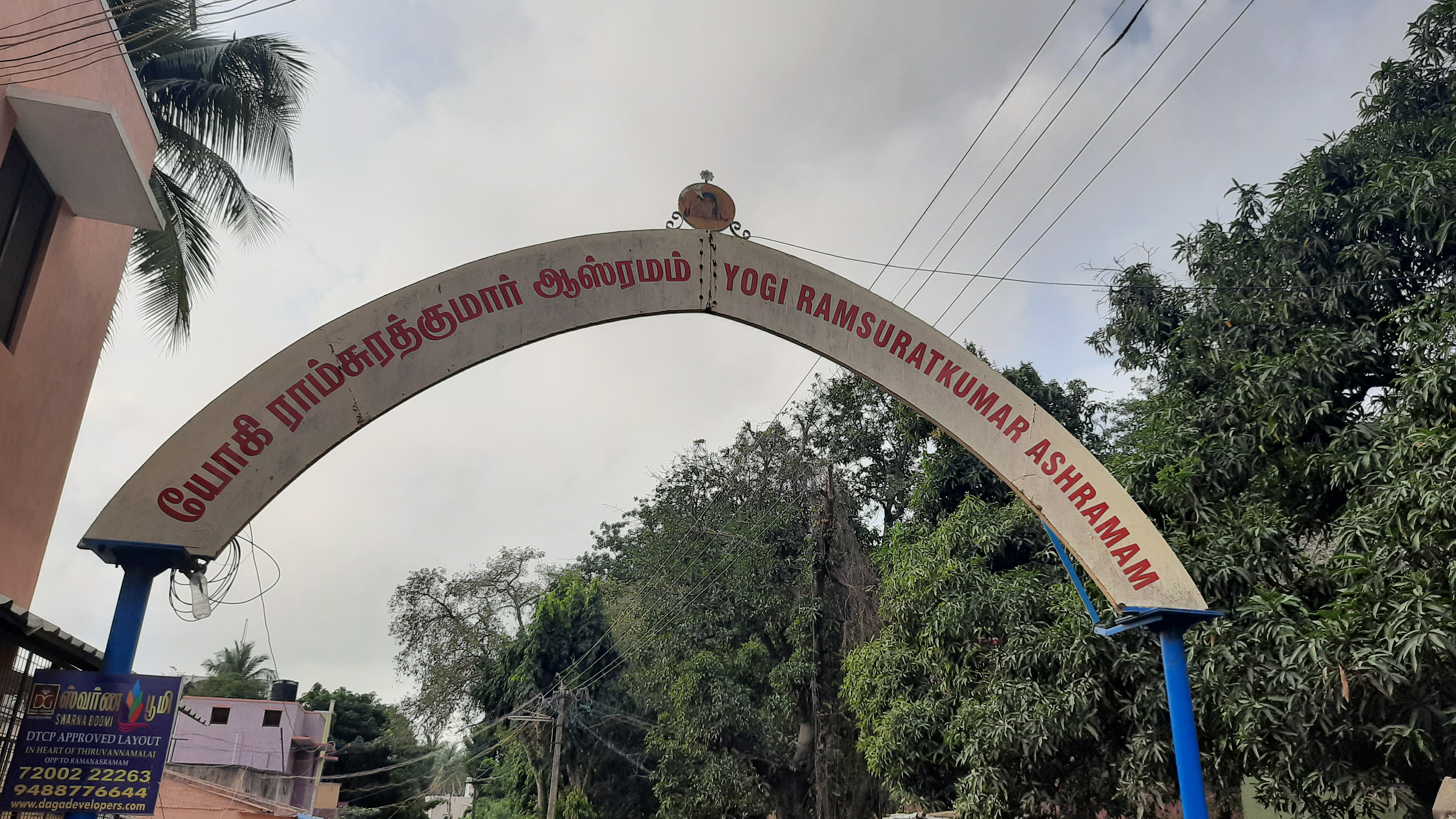
Ashram sign at main street, Tiruvannamalai

== Students in the West ==
Yogi Ramsuratkumar's prominent Western students were Lee Lozowick, who founded "Western Baul" communities in the United States and Europe, Krishna Carcelle (Gaurakrishna), who published the Vedantic monthly magazine 'Rama Nama' and created the website of 'Yogi Ramsuratkumar Bhavan' with the blessings of his Master, and publishes free ebooks on Yogi Ramsuratkumar and Hilda Charlton of New York, who was a spiritual leader and taught meditation in New York and written about Sri Yogi Ramsuratkumar in her book "Saints Alive".

== Biography ==
Biography of Yogi Ramsuratkumar.
