= Bolepur Bluez =

Indian rock band

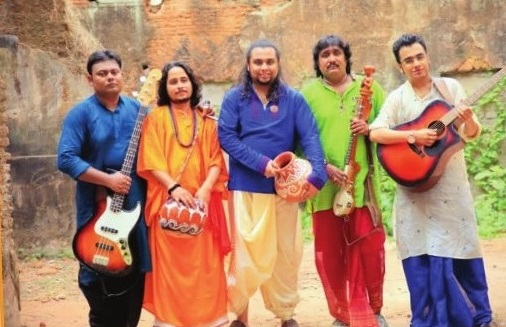

Background information
- Origin: Kolkata, West Bengal, India
- Genres: Rock, Baul, Fusion
- Years active: 21 August 2010–present
- Members: Kunal Kundu, Raju Das Baul, Abhijit Acharya, Kushal "Tony" Kundu, Aditya Dutta
- Past members: Basudeb Das Baul, Kartik das baul Aaron Darnal, Ranjan

Bolepur Bluez (Bengali: বোলপুর ব্লুজ) is a Baul Rock fusion band from Kolkata, India. The band's stated goal is to recreate the traditional music of West Bengal, usually played by the traditional inhabitants known as Bauls. Through a fusion of modern-electric 'rock' instruments with traditional acoustic sounds, Bolepur Bluez aspires to bring Baul music to international audiences. In 2010, they participated in India's Got Talent, where they received a positive reception.

== History ==
Bolepur Bluez formed in August 2010 and released their debut album, The Soul Connection in December 2011, through EMI Records. The album stayed on top of the charts for three months. It was nominated for the Mirchi Music Awards and the Zee Bangla Gourav Samman Awards in 2012.

Bolepur Bluez was featured on television shows and on several radio talk shows.

Bolepur Bluez was the first Bengali band to perform at Bacardi NH7 Weekender (Red Bull Tour Bus) in Kolkata, 2013.

In 2016, The band also performed at Cadbury's Mishti Fair at Salt Lake, Kolkata.

== Band members ==
A previous band lineup was: Kartick Das Baul – Vocals, Aaron Darnal – Guitars, Ranjan Das – Bass, Kunal Kundu – Drums

In August 2015, Kunal Kundu announced a band lineup of Raju Das Baul – Vocals and Khamak, Kunal Kundu – Drums, Abhijit Acharya – Vocals & Dotara / Percussion, Kushal "Tony" Kundu – Lead Guitarist, Aditya Dutta – Bass Guitar.

== Music videos ==
The band released their first music video for the song "Hrid Majhaare," which was produced by Rooh Music. The song was recognized as one of the most beautiful and enchanting Baul/folk songs from Bengal and was covered by various artists and bands in different styles. A previous version of this track was released by EMI Records in 2011.

The band released a music video depicting the love of the Hindu Gods, Krishna and Radha, inside a 150-year-old Rajbari (palace) which is now in ruins. The music video was featured on Pepsi MTV Indies. The original Hindi lyrics in this song were written by Kunal Kundu, the founder and drummer of the band.

== The Soul Connection ==
The album was released internationally in December 2011 by EMI Records.

=== Tracks ===
No.	Title	Writer(s)	Length
1.	"Hrid Majhare"	Folk/Bolepur Bluez	4:30
2.	"Motike Gourange Biye De Na"	Folk/Bolepur Bluez	4:57
3.	"Aage ki Sundor Din Kataitam"	Folk/Bolepur Bluez	7:23
4.	"Golemale Pirit Koro Na"	Folk/Bolepur Bluez	5:44
5.	"Nodi Bhora Dheu"	Folk/Bolepur Bluez	5:26
6.	"Kolonkini Radha"	Folk/Bolepur Bluez	6:41
7.	"Dil Ki Doya"	Folk/Bolepur Bluez	5:26
