= Lodowick =

Lodowick is a given name. Notable people with the name include:

- Lodowick Bryskett, 16th-century Irish poet and translator
- Lodowick Carlell (1602–1675), English playwright

== See also ==
- Charles Lodwik (1658–1723), Mayor of New York City from 1694 to 1695
- Lodowicke Muggleton (1609–1698), English plebeian religious thinker
- Lozowick, a surname
