= Lee Lozowick =

American spiritual teacher

- Born: November 18, 1943; South Orange, New Jersey, United States
- Died: November 16, 2010 (aged 66); Prescott, Arizona, United States
- Other names: Lee Khepa Baul, Lee Kṣepā Baul
- Occupations: Spiritual teacher, author, poet, lyricist, singer, and playwright
- Known for: Founder of Hohm
- Parent(s): Louis Lozowick, Adele Turner

Lee Lozowick (also known by the religious titles and Vaishnava Baul guru names and honorifics Khepa Lee and Lee Khepa Baul (also romanized Lee Kṣepā Baul); November 18, 1943 – November 16, 2010) was an American spiritual teacher, author, poet, lyricist and singer from Prescott, Arizona. He wrote over forty books on spiritual practice and parenting, many of which have been translated into French, German, Spanish, Portuguese and other languages. Some of the titles include: In the Fire, Conscious Parenting, The Alchemy of Transformation, The Alchemy of Love and Sex, The Only Grace is Loving God, and Enlightened Duality (with M Young). He presented himself as a representative of the "Western Baul" tradition.

== Biography ==
Lee Lozowick was born on November 18, 1943, to Ukrainian-American artist Louis Lozowick and Adele Turner, who had married in 1933 and lived in South Orange, New Jersey.

=== Interest in spiritualism ===
Lozowick became a student of Silva Mind Control in 1970 and became interested in the Human Potential Movement around the same time. He had an awakening experience in 1975. During this period he operated a small center in Mount Tabor, New Jersey, where Silva Mind Control was taught, along with occasional guest lectures and acoustic guitar lessons for younger attendees. In his early phase "some people accused Lee of plagiarizing the work of Da Free John. Lozowick reports that his speaking style and writing were the articulation of his own experience and denies the charge." With several of his students, he made a pilgrimage to India in 1977, where he met Yogi Ramsuratkumar. Lozowick became Ramsuratkumar's disciple and attributed his earlier awakening, or what he refers to as a "shift in context," retroactively to the mystic, although he did not feel much connection to him until the 1980s. Lozowick subsequently became known to many people the world over as the "Heart-Son" of Yogi Ramsuratkumar after he wrote several volumes of devotional poetry containing over a thousand poems dedicated to his spiritual master.

=== Hohm community ===
Lozowick then formed a spiritual community called Hohm in New Jersey and began to gather disciples. In 1980, he moved the community to Arizona, where it comprised a "Hohm Sahaj Mandir" (Hohm Innate Divinity Temple) and the "Hohm Community." Lozowick founded three ashrams: Triveni Ashram in Arizona; the Ramji Association's Ashram at Ferme de Jutreau in Saint-Pierre-de-Maillé, France, and the Triveni II Ashram in Tiruvannamalai, India. The Community also established Hohm Press, which has published a number of books on topics such as natural health, Eastern religion, poetry, and parenting, including those written by Lozowick. According to scholar Helen Crovetto, who has studied the community, "Lee said the word 'Hohm' has no translation and chose not to elaborate on its significance."

Lozowick came to identify with the Baul tradition of Bengal, speculating that Yogi Ramsuratkumar may have had some connection to that community as well during years of his early life that he no longer remembered or refused to disclose, although Ramsuratkumar was not a Baul by lineage. Subsequently, however, the Hohm community did establish relationships with a number of Bengali Bauls, such as Sanatan Das and Purna Das. The focus of spiritual practice in Lozowick's teaching is guru yoga, and some have considered him a proponent of "crazy wisdom." (divine madness, according to Georg Feuerstein). He was an ardent admirer of Chogyam Trungpa. Lozowick was known to discourage potential students in his public lectures with the "sexual content of much of" his talk, or by "loud obnoxiousness." "His public demeanor seems to be a technique for scaring away those who are only superficially interested in the spiritual path."

Members of the Hohm community are lacto-vegetarian and must not consume alcohol or tobacco. The Hohm community also incorporates elements of the work of George I. Gurdjieff into their philosophy, particularly "in the Western Bauls' speculations about the existence of soul and especially in their adoption of his chakra system."

As of 2006, total membership in the Hohm community was "not much more than a hundred," in part due to the desire of Lozowick to keep the number of disciples down to a number where he could remain on a first name basis with all of them. Hohm community members incorporate music into their spiritual practice, and a few are in blues and rock bands, first started by Lozowick, principally (at present) Shri, and The Denise Allen Band.

During the last twenty years of his life, Lozowick had an enduring friendship and collaboration with the late spiritual teacher, Arnaud Desjardins, as well as with Robert Svoboda, and Llewellyn Vaughan-Lee.

Lozowick died of cancer on November 16, 2010, in Prescott, Arizona, after a long illness. His work is carried on by his disciples, including Purna Steinitz, who has his own "Trimurti Community" begun in 1998 in Bozeman, Montana, and Lalitha, in Lumby, Canada. They are the only two who have "received permission to teach in his lineage."
