= Louis Lozowick =

American painter (1892–1973)

- Born: 1892; Liudvynivka, Kiev Governorate, Russian Empire
- Died: 1973 (aged 80–81); New Jersey, U.S.
- Education: Kiev Art School; National Academy of Design; Ohio State University
- Known for: Painting, Printmaking
- Notable work: Pittsburgh (1922–1923), Detroit (Urban Geometry) (1925–1927)
- Movement: Constructivism, Precisionism, Art Deco
- Spouse: Adele Turner
- Children: Lee Lozowick

Louis Lozowick (1892–1973) (Ukrainian: Луї Лозовик, romanized: Lui Lozovyk) was a Ukrainian-born American painter and printmaker. He is recognized as an Art Deco and Precisionist artist, and mainly produced streamline, urban-inspired monochromatic lithographs in a career that spanned 50 years.

Janet Flint, then Curator of the Department of Prints and Drawings at the National Museum of American Art in Washington, D.C., wrote in 1982: "Louis Lozowick occupies a premier position among those artists whose imaginations have been touched by the city and its rich variety of architectural forms. In his paintings, drawings, and especially his superb lithographs, Lozowick achieved new aesthetic dimensions in his interpretations of the skyscrapers, smokestacks, elevated trains, and bridges of America. He was a man of diverse interests and talents – historian and critic as well as pioneering artist – whose significant contributions to the art and thought of his age are only coming to be fully recognized".

== Early life ==
Lozowick was born in Liudvynivka, Kiev Governorate, Russian Empire (now Ukraine) in 1892 to Jewish parents Abraham and Mary (Tafipolsky) Lozowick. His parents moved to Kiev when he was young, in 1903, and he attended Kiev Art School before he immigrated to the United States, where he continued his studies at the National Academy of Design (New York) and Ohio State University. In American Prints: From Hopper to Pollock the authors wrote: "With the outbreak of the 1905 Revolution he left Russia and joined his brother in America in 1906. From 1912 to 1915 he studied at the National Academy of Design, New York, followed by further studies at Ohio State University, where he graduated in 1918." In America, Lozowick became fluent in English, in addition to his native Ukrainian, Russian, and Yiddish.

== Career ==
From 1919 to 1924 Lozowick lived and traveled throughout Europe, spending most of his time in Paris, Berlin and Moscow. In the mid-1920s he started making his first lithographs. During this period he contributed an article to Broom which was very appreciative of Veshch-Gegenstand Objekt, by El Lissitzky and Ilya Ehrenburg.

From American Prints: From Hopper to Pollock: "Lozowick's most formative years were spent in Europe from 1920 until 1924. In 1920 he lived in Paris, mixing freely with the international artistic community, and in 1922 he briefly visited Moscow, where he met Kasimir Malevich and Vladimir Tatlin. But it was Berlin, where he lived between 1922 and 1924, which had the most profound impact in developing his machine aesthetic, initiated through his friendship with the Russian Constructivist El Lissitsky and other émigré artists. Inspired by their machine-age aesthetic, Lozowick began a series of paintings of American cities recalled from a journey he had made across American in the year prior to his departure. In Berlin he also produced his first lithographs, Cleveland and Chicago. During these years he also contributed articles and translations to the avant-garde periodical, Broom. He exhibited with Lissitsky and his circle in Düsseldorf in 1922, and had his first solo exhibitions in Berlin in 1922 and 1923."

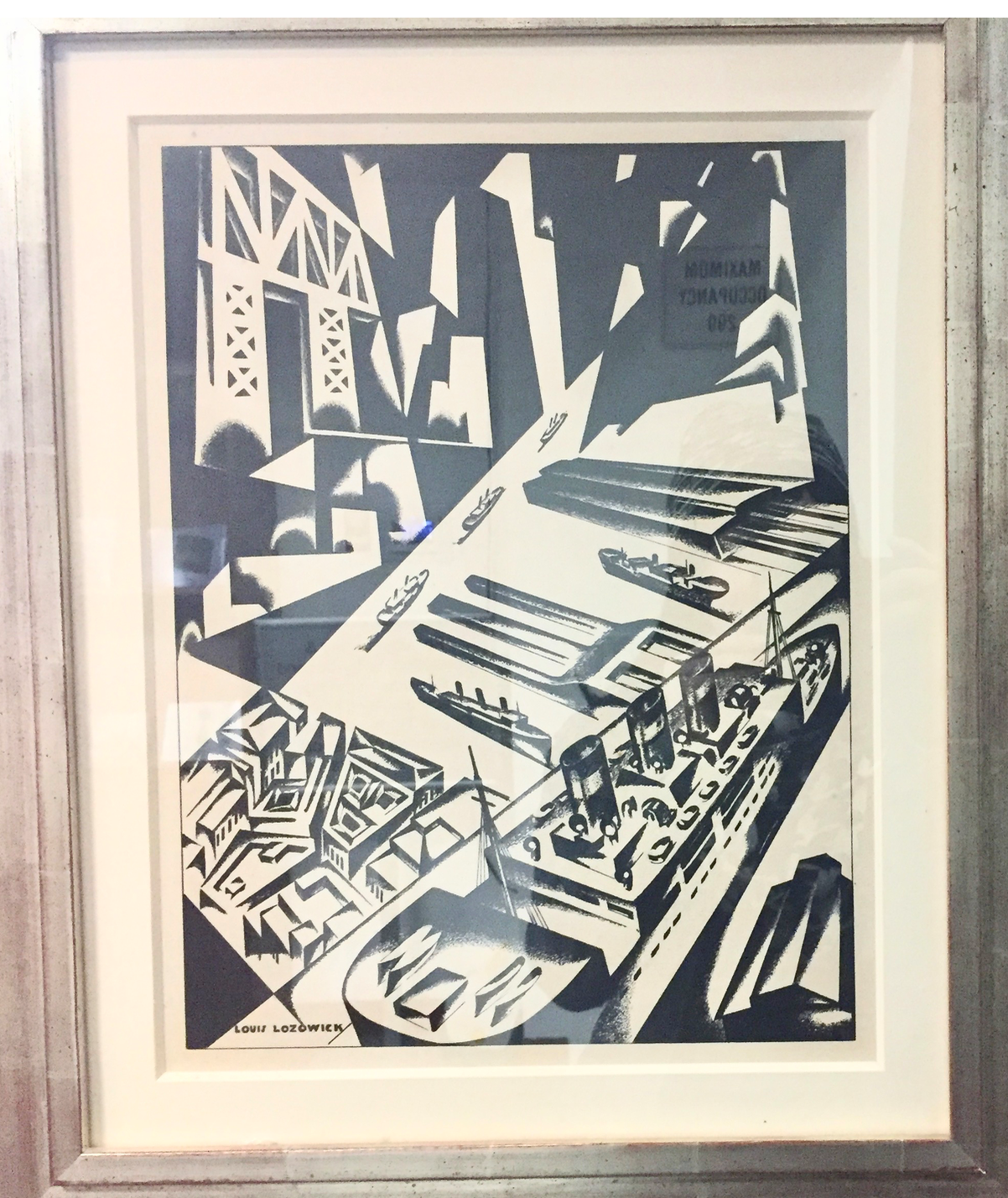
Panama, circa 1925, by Louis Lozowick.

Tanks #1, 1929, lithograph

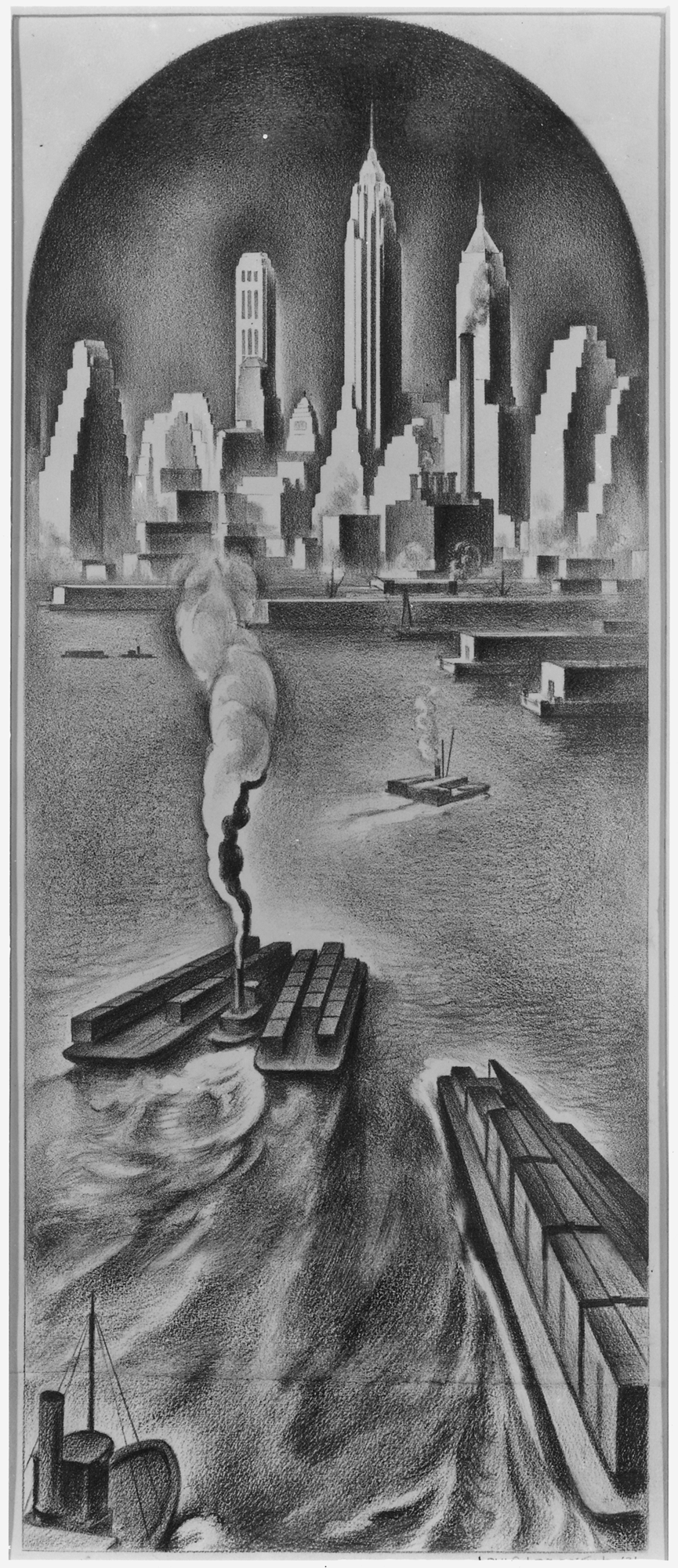
Lower Manhattan, 1936, lithograph

By 1926, when he joined the editorial board of the left-wing journal, New Masses, he was well-versed in current artistic developments in Europe, such as Constructivism and de Stijl. These hard-edged, linear styles, evident in a lithograph called "New York (Brooklyn Bridge)," suggest the possibility of an efficient reframing of the world, as did the political theories espoused in New Masses. A version of this lithograph was planned as a cover for New Masses that was never published.

Lozowick was highly interested in the development of the Russian avant-garde and even published a monograph on Russian Constructivism entitled Modern Russian Art. In 1943 Lozowick moved to South Orange, New Jersey where he continued to paint and make prints. He also became a father that year, with the birth of his son Lee. The human condition remained a constant theme of his art, and an ongoing interest in nature appears more frequently in his later works. From The Prints of Louis Lozowick - A Catalogue Raisonné: "Landscape and figure studies had infrequently appeared earlier in Lozowick's work. Now his choice of subject became increasingly devoted to almost classic visions of figures posed in idyllic landscapes, picturesque trees and landmarks, or treasured vignettes from summer holidays and trips. . . .A poetic sensibility that had been implicit in the soaring bridges and skyscrapers of earlier prints was now more frankly expressed in works that revealed an unembarrassed romanticism."

The art critic for The New Yorker, Peter Schjeldahl, wrote a highly positive review of the exhibit "The Left Front: Radical Art in the 'Red Decade,' 1929-1940" at New York University's Grey Art Gallery in 2015 which included work by Lozowick. Schjeldahl wrote "…the aesthetic zest of sheer modernity leaks through in the work of such artists as the Ukraine-born Louis Lozowick, a still underrated virtuosic precisionist. His elegant lithograph "Construction" (1930), showing work on a New York street, with a cutaway view of stacked wooden supports underground, is formally inventive and feels celebratory."

In Aspects of American Printmaking, 1800-1950, Sinclair Hitchings wrote, "Are there such things as American Master Prints? Most certainly there are -- by Joseph Pennell, John Sloan, John Marin, George Bellows, Edward Hopper, Louis Lozowick, Martin Lewis, Rockwell Kent, Reginald March, Stuart Davis, Milton Avery, Raphael Soyer, Yasuo Kuniyoshi, Stow Wengenroth, and Ivan Albright, among others. The outpouring of prints in the United States after 1900 constituted a major artistic happening, one that will be duly chronicled in histories of printmaking in times to come."

== Personal ==
He married Adele Turner in 1933 and moved a few years later to South Orange, where their son Lee Lozowick was born on November 18, 1943. Lozowick passed away in the Orange Memorial Hospital, in South Orange, New Jersey.

== See also ==
- Art Deco
- Precisionism
- New Masses
- John Reed Club

== Bibliography ==
- Associated American Artists. (1992). Louis Lozowick : a centennial exhibition of paintings, drawings and prints: December 2–31, 1992. New York: author.
- Flint, J.A. (1982). The prints of Louis Lozowick : a catalogue raisonné. New York: Hudson Hills Press.
- Harnsberger, R.S. (1992). Ten precisionist artists : annotated bibliographies [Art Reference Collection no. 14]. Westport, CT: Greenwood Press.
- Marquardt, Virginia H. (Ed.) (1997). Survivor from a Dead Age: The Memoirs of Louis Lozowick. Washington, D.C.: Smithsonian Institution Press.
