= Vijaynagar'er Hirey (soundtrack) =

2026 soundtrack album by Indraadip Dasgupta

- Album cover

Soundtrack album by Indraadip Dasgupta
- Released: 20 January 2026
- Recorded: 2025
- Studios: Studio Vibration, Kolkata; WCZ Studios, Kolkata
- Genre: Feature film soundtrack
- Length: 15:58
- Language: Bengali
- Label: SVF Music
- Producer: Indraadip Dasgupta

Indraadip Dasgupta chronology
Lawho Gouranger Naam Rey (2025)	Vijaynagar'er Hirey (2026)	Saptadingar Guptodhon (2026)

Singles from Vijaynagar'er Hirey
- 1. "Jaatra Shubho Hok" Released: 5 January 2026; 2. "Kakababu Title Song" Released: 25 January 2026; 3. "Jeetey Jaabe Je Raja" Released: 6 February 2026

Vijaynagar'er Hirey is the soundtrack album composed by Indraadip Dasgupta, to the 2026 Indian Bengali-language action-adventure film of the same name, directed by Chandrasish Ray. A sequel to Kakababur Protyaborton (2022) and the fourth instalment in the SVF Kakababu franchise, it stars Prosenjit Chatterjee, Aryann Bhowmik and Pushan Dasgupta in lead roles. The film is produced by Shrikant Mohta and Prosenjit himself under their respective banners of Shree Venkatesh Films and Nideas Productions,

The album was released on 20 January 2025, under the SVF Music label, ahead of the film's theatrical release during Saraswati Puja. The soundtrack contains three singles—"Kakababu Title Song", "Jaatra Shubho Hok" and "Jeetey Jaabe Je Raja", with lyrics penned by Srijato and Prasen.

== Background and development ==
The development of the Vijaynagar'er Hirey soundtrack began in early 2025. A central narrative in the album's production was the high-profile return of Indraadip Dasgupta to the franchise, who had composed for the three previous installments—Mishawr Rawhoshyo (2013), Yeti Obhijaan (2017), and Kakababur Protyaborton (2022). Dasgupta sought to maintain the franchise's musical continuity while introducing a distinct sonic identity for the Hampi-based narrative. His vision for the film was to move away from the "overtly synthetic" textures of modern thrillers in favor of an "acoustic-heavy soundscape" that felt as ancient as the Vijayanagara ruins themselves. He aimed to create a score that functioned as a "silent narrator," guiding the audience through the film's historical mysteries. In an interview to The Times of India, Dasgupta noted that he wanted the music to reflect the geographical transition from Kolkata to Karnataka, ensuring the score felt "rooted in the red soil of Hampi."

The soundtrack pays homage to the legacy of the previous films by re-integrating the iconic "Kakababu Theme", all sung by Rupam Islam. Originally established as a symphonic motif, the 2026 version was rearranged to be more percussion-driven and fast-paced to align with the film's high-octane action sequences, such as the Tungabhadra River chase.

It marked the tenth collaboration between Dasgupta and Prosenjit after Mishawr Rawhoshyo, Hanuman.com (2013), Lorai (2015), Yeti Obhijaan, Kishore Kumar Junior (2018), Gumnaami (2019), Nirontor, Kakababur Protyaborton and Ajogyo (2024).

== Musical structure ==
=== Singles ===
The composition is characterized by its "Indo-Western fusion," using a technical blend of Carnatic musical instruments and a Western symphonic orchestra.

- Instrumentation: In the song "Kakababu Title", Dasgupta heavily featured the Veena, Mridangam, and Ghatam to capture the South Indian setting. These were layered against a 40-piece live string section to provide the cinematic scale required for an adventure epic.
- Thematic Motifs: A recurring flute motif was used to represent the "mystery of the diamonds," appearing in minor keys during scenes of peril and shifting to major keys during moments of discovery.

=== Background score ===
The background score was lauded for its "restrained intensity", a choice noted by critics for allowing the environmental sounds of the Tungabhadra River and Hampi ruins to build natural tension. Dasgupta chose to leave certain tension-filled sequences silent or sparsely scored with a low-frequency drone, allowing the natural foley (wind, river sounds, footsteps) to heighten the realism of the expedition. He utilized aggressive percussion and brass stabs to underscore the film's signature action sequences—specifically a five-day filmed coracle chase. The score also features an evolved arrangement of the "Kakababu Theme," using a faster tempo (134 BPM) to signal the heightened stakes of this instalment.

During the entry sequence of Kakababu in the film, Dasgupta referenced a tune from his another composition "Kakababur Gaan" from Mishawr Rawhoshyo.

== Release ==
The soundtrack preceded with three singles: "Jaatra Shubho Hok" was the first to be released on 5 January 2026, followed by "Kakababu Title Song" on 25 January 2026, and "Jeetey Jaabe Je Raja" on 6 February 2026. The soundtrack album was released on 20 January 2026, three days before the film's release.

== Track listing ==
Track listing
No.	Title	Lyrics	Singer(s)	Length
1.	"Jaatra Shubho Hok"	Prasen	Durnibar Saha, Debayan Banerjee	5:06
2.	"Kakababu Title Song"	Srijato	Rupam Islam	4:22
3.	"Jeetey Jaabe Je Raja"	Srijato	Shaan	6:30

== Personnel ==
=== Backing Vocals ===
Additional vocals: John Paul, Subhadeep Pan, Raktim Raj

=== Personnel ===
Song	Personnel
"Kakababu Title Song"	Veena: Subhrajyoti Sen; Mridangam, Ghatam: Somnath Roy; Electric Guitar: Pritish, Soumyadeep Das; Acoustic guitar: Pritish; Bass: Sunny Subhadeep Saha; Drums: Alloy Francis
"Jaatra Shubho Hok"	Guitar, Oud: Zakiruddin Khan
"Jeetey Jaabe Je Raja"	Guitar: John Paul

=== Production ===
- Producer: Indraadip Dasgupta
- Lyricists: Srijato, Prasen
- Programming & Arrangement: Shamik Chakravarty, Prasenjit "Pom" Chakraborty
- Rhythm Design: Rupam Percussionist, Arnab Das
- Mixing & Mastering: Subhadeep Pan
- Music Label: SVF Music
