= List of Indian Bengali films of 2017 =

This is a following list of Indian Bengali films released by West Bengal film Industry.

== January–March ==
Opening		Title	Director	Cast	Production company	Genre	Notes
J A N U A R Y	13	The Bongs Again	Anjan Dutt	Parno Mitra, Neha Panda, Gaurav Chakrabarty & Jisshu Sengupta	Eskay Movies	Drama	
J A N U A R Y	13	Kichhukshan	Anag Ranjan Pashi	Sanjib Sarkar, Piyali	Kalyan Sinha Roy of Events Worldwide & Communication	Drama	
J A N U A R Y	13	Ei To Jeebon	Biplob Sarkar	Suman Islam		Drama	
J A N U A R Y	20	Bibaho Diaries	Mainik Bhowmik	Ritwick Chakraborty, Sohini Sarkar, Biswanath Bas	Camellia Productions Pvt. Ltd.	Comedy, Drama	
F E B R U A R Y	3	Tomake Chai	Rajiv Kumar Biswas	Bonny Sengupta, Koushani Mukherjee	Shree Venkatesh Films	Comedy, Romance, Drama	
F E B R U A R Y	10	Devi	Rick Basu	Paoli Dam, Shataf Figar	Macneill Engineering Ltd.	Drama	
F E B R U A R Y	17	61 Garpar Lane	Rajesh Dutta, Ipsita Roy Sarkar	Soumitra Chatterjee, Priyanshu Chatterjee		Social Drama	
M A R C H	24	Mandobashar Galpo	Tathagata Banerjee	Parambrata Chatterjee, Paoli Dam		Drama	
M A R C H	24	Golmaal	Narayan Roy	Mithun Chakraborty, Roopa Ganguly		Drama	
M A R C H	31	Meher Aali	Arindam Dey	Hiran, Satarupa Pyne,	Anuska Art & Niyasha Filmz	Drama	
M A R C H	31	Ebong Kiriti	Anirban Parin	Priyanshu Chatterjee, Barun Chanda		Drama	

== April–June ==
Opening		Title	Director	Cast	Production Company	Genre	Notes
A P R I L	14	One	Birsa Dasgupta	Prosenjit Chatterjee, Yash Dasgupta, Nusrat Jahan	Shree Venkatesh Films	Romance, Thriller	
A P R I L	14	Bishorjan	Kaushik Ganguly	Abir Chatterjee, Jaya Ahsan		Drama	
A P R I L	28	Durga Sohay	Arindam Sil	Sohini Sarkar	AVMA MEDIA LLP	Drama	
M A Y	5	Porobashinee	Shawpan Ahmed	Enom		Science Fiction	
M A Y	12	Posto	Shiboprasad Mukherjee	Jisshu Sengupta, Mimi Chakraborty	Windows Production House	Drama	
M A Y	19	Ami Je Ke Tomar	Ravi Kinagi	Ankush Hazra, Sayantika Banerjee, Nusrat Jahan	Shree Venkatesh Films	Romance, Drama	
M A Y	26	Khoj	Arka Ganguly	Vikram Chatterjee, Shataf Figar, Lalit Malla	Magic Moments Motion Pictures	Mystery, Thriller	
M A Y	26	Messi	Riingo Banerjee	Aryann Bhowmik, Ronodeep Bose, Chaiti Ghosal, Rana Mitra, Aishika	Macneill Engineering	Sport, Drama	
M A Y	26	Amar Aponjon	Raja Chanda	Soham Chakraborty, Subhashree Ganguly	Ajorso Entertainment, Sunday Films	Romance, Drama	
J U N E	16	Secret Love Story	Narugopal Mandal	Soumitra Chatterjee, Goutam Guru, Santana Bose, Robi Kumar, Narugopal Mandal, Tribeni Adhikari & Others. Script, Dialogue & Lyrics: Narugopal Mandal.	Sri Sri Om Narasingha Jue Production & N M Production	Drama	https://www.imdb.com/title/tt7787762
J U N E	23	Chaamp	Raj Chakraborty	Dev, Rukmini Maitra	Dev Entertainment Ventures	Romance, Action, Sport	First movie from DEV Production house
J U N E	30	Boss 2: Back to Rule	Baba Yadav	Jeet, Subhashree Ganguly, Nusrat Faria Mazhar	Jeetz Filmworks, Walzen Media Works	Crime, Thriller	Sequel to Boss: Born to Rule and Indo Bangladesh joint production with Jaaz Multimedia

== July–September ==
Opening		Title	Director	Cast	Production company	Genre	Notes
J U L Y	21	Dekh Kemon Lage	Abhijit Guha, Sudeshna Roy	Soham Chakraborty, Subhashree Ganguly	Greentouch Entertainment	Romantic Comedy	
J U L Y	21	Meghnad Badh Rahasya	Anik Datta	Sabyasachi Chakraborty, Abir Chatterjee, Barun Chanda, Saayoni Ghosh	Friend's Communication	Thriller	
J U L Y	21	Comrade	Shankhudeb Panda	Ena Saha, Kharaj Mukherjee, Moubani Sorcar		Drama	
J U L Y	28	Nabab	Joydeep Mukherjee	Shakib Khan, Subhashree Ganguly	Eskay Movies	Action	Indo Bangladesh joint production with Jaaz Multimedia
A U G U S T	4	Jawker Dhan	Sayantan Ghosal	Rahul Banerjee, Sabyasachi Chakraborty, Parambrata Chatterjee, Priyanka Sarkar, Koushik Sen	Champion Movies	Action, Adventure, Mystery	
A U G U S T	11	Dhananjay	Arindam Sil	Anirban Bhattacharya, Mimi Chakraborty	SVF Entertainment	Thriller, Drama, Crime, Biopic	
A U G U S T	18	Haripada Haribol	Subir Saha	Rajatava Dutta, Dolon Roy, Sampurna Lahiri, Dipankar Dey	Prague Entertainment pvt. Ltd.	Comedy, Drama	
A U G U S T	18	Maacher Jhol	Pratim D. Gupta	Ritwick Chakraborty, Paoli Dam	Sony Pictures Networks	Drama	
A U G U S T	25	Chaya O Chobi	Kaushik Ganguly	Abir Chatterjee, Koel Mullick, Priyanka Sarkar, Churni Ganguly	Surinder Films	Drama	
S E P T E M B E R	1	Bilu Rakkhosh	Indrasis Acharya	Joy Sengupta, Koneenicha Bannerjee		Drama	
S E P T E M B E R	8	Shob Bhooturey	Birsa Dasgupta	Abir Chatterjee, Sohini Sarkar	SVF Entertainment	Horror, Drama	
S E P T E M B E R	22	Cockpit	Kamaleshwar Mukherjee	Dev, Koel Mallick, Rukmini Maitra	Dev Entertainment Ventures	Adventure, Drama	Second movie from DEV Production house
S E P T E M B E R	22	Yeti Obhijaan	Srijit Mukherjee	Aryann Bhowmik, Prasenjit Chatterjee	Shree Venkatesh Films	Adventure, Thriller	Second of "Kakababu" series from "Pahar Churay Atonko"
S E P T E M B E R	22	Bolo Dugga Maiki	Raj Chakraborty	Ankush Hazra, Nusrat Jahan	SVF Entertainment	Comedy, Romance	
S E P T E M B E R	22	Byomkesh O Agnibaan	Anjan Dutta	Jisshu Sengupta	RP Production	Mystery, Suspense, Thriller	
S E P T E M B E R	22	Projapoti Biskut	Anindya Chatterjee	Aditya Sengupta, Ishaa Saha, Aparajita Adhya		Comedy, Romance	
S E P T E M B E R	22	Shrestha Bangali	Swapan Saha	Rajpal Yadav, Ulka Gupta, Riju, Shakti Kapoor		Action, Drama, Thriller	

== October–December ==
Opening		Title	Director	Cast	Production company	Genre	Notes
O C T O B E R	6	Raktokorobi	Amitava Bhattacharya	Kaushik Sen			
O C T O B E R	20	Jio Pagla	Ravi Kinagi	Jisshu Sengupta, Soham Chakraborty, Hiran, Bonny Sengupta, Srabanti Chatterjee, Payel Sarkar, Koushani Mukherjee, Rittika Sen	Surinder Films	Romance, Comedy	
O C T O B E R	27	No Bed of Roses	Mostofa Sarwar Farooki	Irrfan Khan, Nusrat Imrose Tisha, Parno Mitra	Eskay Movies, Irrfan Khan Films	Drama	Indo-Bangladesh joint venture film and co-produced by Jaaz Multimedia
N O V E M B E R	18	Romantic Noy	Rajib Chowdhury	Saheb Bhattacharya		Drama	
N O V E M B E R	24	Samantaral	Partho Chakraborty	Parambrata Chatterjee, Soumitra Chatterjee		Drama	
D E C E M B E R	1	Biler Diary	Biswarup Biswas	Biswanath Basu and Samadarshi Dutta		Drama, Family	
D E C E M B E R	22	Amazon Obhijaan	Kamaleshwar Mukherjee	Dev, Laboni Sarkar	Shree Venkatesh Films	Adventure, Mystery, Drama	Sequel of 2013 film Chander Pahar
D E C E M B E R	29	Mayurakshi	Atanu Ghosh	Soumitra Chatterjee, Prosenjit Chatterjee, Indrani Halder		Drama	
