= Vijaynagar'er Hirey =

2026 Indian Bengali film by Chandrasish Ray

- Theatrical poster
- Bengali: বিজয়নগরের হিরে
- Literally: The Diamond of Vijaynagar
- Directed by: Chandrasish Ray
- Screenplay by: Rohit–Soumya
- Dialogues by: Rohit–Soumya
- Story by: Sunil Gangopadhyay
- Based on: Bijaynagarer Hirey by Sunil Gangopadhyay
- Produced by: Shrikant Mohta; Mahendra Soni; Prosenjit Chatterjee
- Starring: Prosenjit Chatterjee; Chiranjeet Chakraborty; Aryann Bhowmik; Pushan Dasgupta; Rajnandini Paul; Satyam Bhattacharya; Anujoy Chatterjee; Sreya Bhattacharyya
- Cinematography: Indranath Marick
- Edited by: Subhajit Singha
- Music by: Indraadip Dasgupta
- Production companies: Shree Venkatesh Films; Nideas Productions
- Distributed by: PVR Inox Pictures
- Release date: 23 January 2026
- Running time: 110 minutes
- Country: India
- Language: Bengali
- Budget: est.₹3 crore

Vijaynagar'er Hirey (Bengali pronunciation: [vid͡ʒɔjonɔɡorɛr hiːre]; Bengali: বিজয়নগরের হিরে, lit. 'The Diamond of Vijaynagar') is a 2026 Bengali-language action-adventure film directed by Chandrasish Ray. Produced by Shrikant Mohta, Mahendra Soni and Prosenjit Chatterjee under the respective banners of Shree Venkatesh Films and Nideas Productions, the film is based on the 1988 eponymous novel by Sunil Gangopadhyay, from his Kakababu series. The narrative follows Kakababu and Shontu embarking on a perilous quest for a lost diamond in the Vijayanagara Empire.

A sequel to Kakababur Protyaborton (2022) and the fourth instalment in the SVF Kakababu franchise, it stars Prosenjit Chatterjee and Aryann Bhowmik reprising their roles as Kakababu and Shontu respectively, alongside an ensemble cast of Pushan Dasgupta, Satyam Bhattacharya, Rajnandini Paul, Anujoy Chatterjee and Sreya Bhattacharyya in other pivotal roles, with Chiranjeet Chakraborty in a special appearance.

The film was officially announced in February 2025, marking Ray's second collaboration with Prosenjit. Principal photography commenced in March 2025 and ended in May 2025. Major parts of the film were shot in Hampi and Bengaluru with a sporadic schedule, and portions were shot in Kolkata. Music of the film is composed by Indraadip Dasgupta, with lyrics penned by Srijato and Prasen. The cinematography and editing of the film were handled by Indranath Marick and Subhajit Singha, respectively.

Vijaynagar'er Hirey was released on 23 January 2026, coinciding with Netaji Jayanti and Saraswati Puja. It opened to positive reviews from critics and audience. The film was premiered at the 12th Kolkata International Children's Film Festival.

== Plot ==
Kakababu aka Raja Roychowdhury and his team are moving for a historical exploration towards Hampi, the ancient capital of Hindu Vijayanagara Empire in the 14th-century. Mr. Ranjan Sanyal and his wife Rinku are also accompanying him with Shontu and Jojo in this adventure. Suddenly one Mohan Singh threats them not to go there. But Kakababu enters in Hampi, to visit the Hampi Group of Monuments and meets famous historian Bhagawati Prasad Sharma. He realises that a mafia gang is trying to find and smuggle the mythical lost diamond of the Vijayanagara Empire, even more precious than the Kohinoor. They kidnap everyone in Kakababu's group to blackmail Kakababu to recover the legendary treasure.

== Cast ==
- Prosenjit Chatterjee as Raja Roy Chowdhury / Kakababu, a former ASI agent
- Aryann Bhowmik as Sunanda "Shontu" Roy Chowdhury, Kakababu's nephew and assistant
- Pushan Dasgupta as Rajat "Jojo" Bhattacharya, Shontu's friend
- Satyam Bhattacharya as Ranjan Sanyal, an undercover IB officer
- Sreya Bhattacharyya as Dr. Rinku Sanyal, Ranjan's wife
- Rajnandini Paul as Kasturidevi Raya, an actress and the princess of the Chandragiri dynasty
- Anujoy Chattopadhyay as Mohan Singh, the leader of Kavach group
- Avishek De Biswas as Birju, Mohan Singh's Aide
- Chiranjeet Chakraborty as Bhagwati Prasad Sharma, Kakababu's mentor and a former ASI agent

== Production ==
=== Development and pre-production ===
In 2011, Srijit Mukherji and Shrikant Mohta licensed three books in the Kakababu series under Sunil Gangopadhyay's consent, which were Mishawr Rawhoshyo, Paharchuraye Aatanka and Jongoler Modhye Ek Hotel, intending to make a trilogy under the banner of Shree Venkatesh Films with Prosenjit Chatterjee playing the aforementioned character. He also revealed that he picked the specific stories as those explore diverse landscapes—desert, mountains and jungle respectively, in order to showcase different adventurous elements. Following the release of its third instalment Kakababur Protyaborton in 2022, Mukherji stated that he had completed making Kakababu films from his end and had no immediate plans to continue the trilogy in the future. Meanwhile, he also expressed to create a multi-universe featuring Kakababu, Byomkesh Bakshi and Feluda, three of the greatest characters in the Bengali literature, with a plot having been already conceptualized; however it did not materialize.

During the filming for the television series Jaha Bolibo Shotto Bolibo for Hoichoi in late-2023, it was reported that director Chandrasish Ray had met Prosenjit at his residence in Kolkata and narrated a script that impressed the actor, in their second collaboration after Nirontor (2020). According to reports, the project, which would have been Prosenjit's 296th film, was expected to be produced by his home-banner Nideas Production, with a planned start in October 2023, but was postponed due to his prior commitments to Maalik (2025), which eventually would be his 296th film. In mid-January 2025, Aajkaal hinted at their collaboration, revealing to be jointly produced by Nideas Production and Shree Venkatesh Films. Reports suggested that Chandrashish Ray might helm the fourth instalment of SVF Kakababu franchise. The film was officially announced at Shree Venkatesh Films' 30-year journey event "Golper Parbon 1432" on 28 February 2025 under the title Vijaynagar'er Hirey, based on the 1988 novel of the same name by Sunil Gangopadhyay; it was reported to be Prosenjit's 298th film. The first look of the film was also revealed on that same day.

Soumik Halder, the cinematographer associated with the previous instalments and Ray's frequent collaborator, exited the film due to his scheduling conflicts with Raghu Dakat (2025), also produced by Shree Venkatesh Films; it led Indranath Marick to replace Halder. Indraadip Dasgupta came on board as the composer reprising from the other films of the franchise. Rohit Dey and Soumya Nandy from the screenwriter duo of Rohit–Soumya reunited with Ray after Jaha Bolibo Shotto Bolibo, and reportedly worked on its script for a year. Anandabazar Patrika noted that Ray would employ de-aging technology for a little flashback portions, featuring a younger Prosenjit. He was reported to sport a thick cheveron moustache once again like the previous films.

The muhurat of the film was held on 21 February 2025 at SVF's office in Kolkata with the cast and crew. Director Haranath Chakraborty was featured there, thereby confirming his inclusion as the creative director.

In children's eyes, there is no distinct boundary between illusion and reality. We went to a school to promote the film, where everyone was calling me "Kakababu". When I went to a restaurant, a child came up to me and asked, "Where are your crutches?" [...] If I attend any event, children ask, "Didn't you bring your stick?" I get inspiration as an actor from these things, because they cannot be influenced by social media.

— Prosenjit Chatterjee

=== Casting ===
Aryann Bhowmik, who used to play Shontu in the previous instalments, was removed from the role because his age did not match the age of the character; then, Arghya Basu Roy stepped into that role. Broto Banerjee was cast to play Shontu's friend Jojo in the film, marking second time screen appearance seven years after Haami (2018). In February 2025, makers decided to bring back Aryann to reprise the role, keeping in mind the franchise's popularity, after several discussions regarding the character. Considering that Jojo's age should also increase if Aryann is playing the role of Shontu, Pushan Dasgupta was finalized for the role accordingly.

Chiranjeet Chakraborty joined in a prominent role, reuniting with Prosenjit, twenty-four years after their last collaboration being Inquilaab (2002). He was reportedly to have a cameo as Kakababu's mentor, B. P. Sharma. Commenting on his limited role, Chiranjeet quoted that he was not bothered since he was more satisfied to be acting with Prosenjit after a long time. He also described his role as "very liberating". Ray added that Chiranjeet was the first actor he directed independently, due to director Kaushik Ganguly's absence in the sets of Dhumketu in 2016, when he used to work as an assistant director under the latter.

In February 2025, Anujoy Chatterjee joined the film as the main antagonist. Satyam Bhattacharya, who had a small presence in the franchise's first film Mishawr Rawhoshyo during his struggling days, instantly agreed to act in the film, citing his desire to work under Ray's direction for the second time after Nirontor (2020). Rajnandini Paul revealed her participation the following month, being the female lead.

=== Filming ===
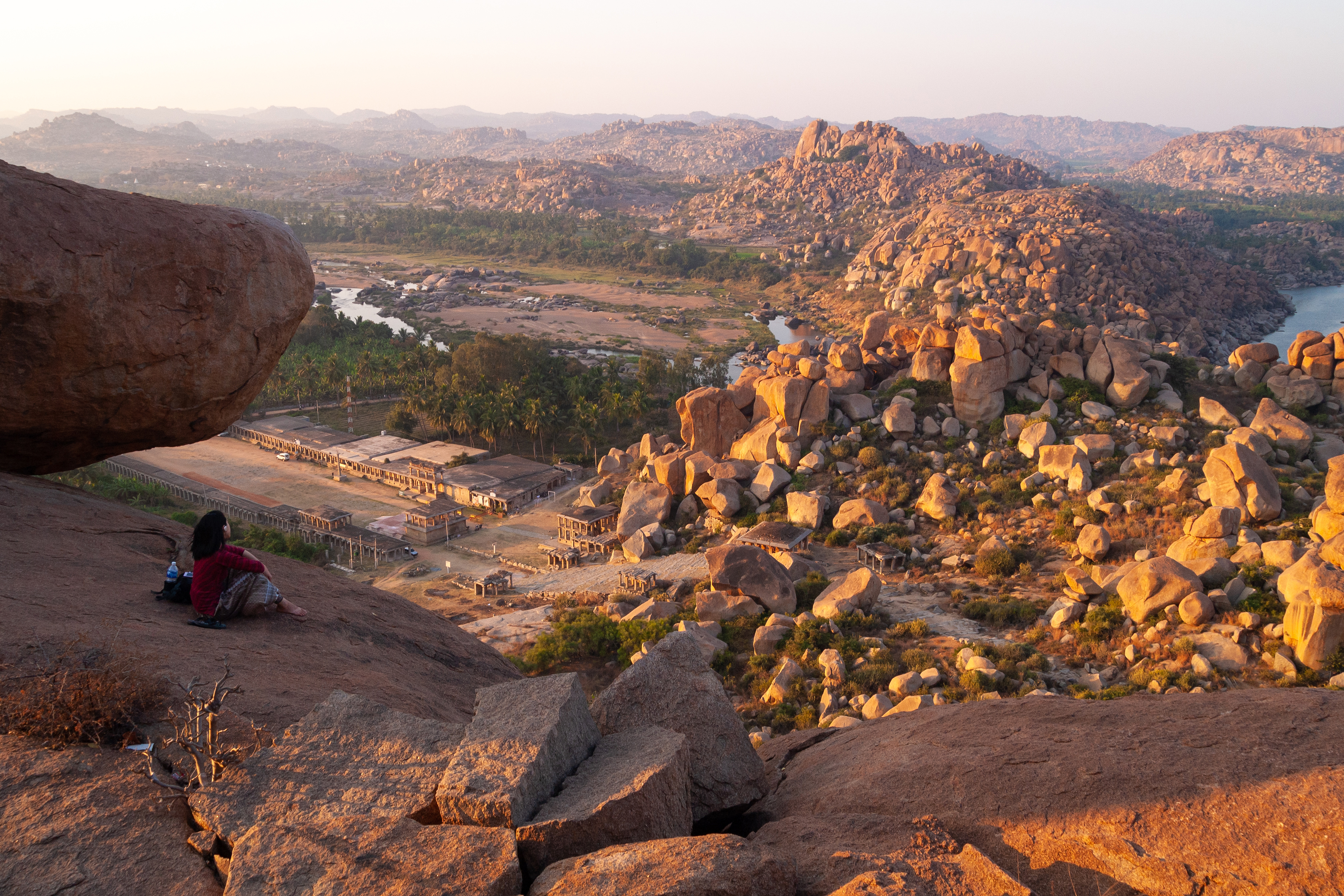
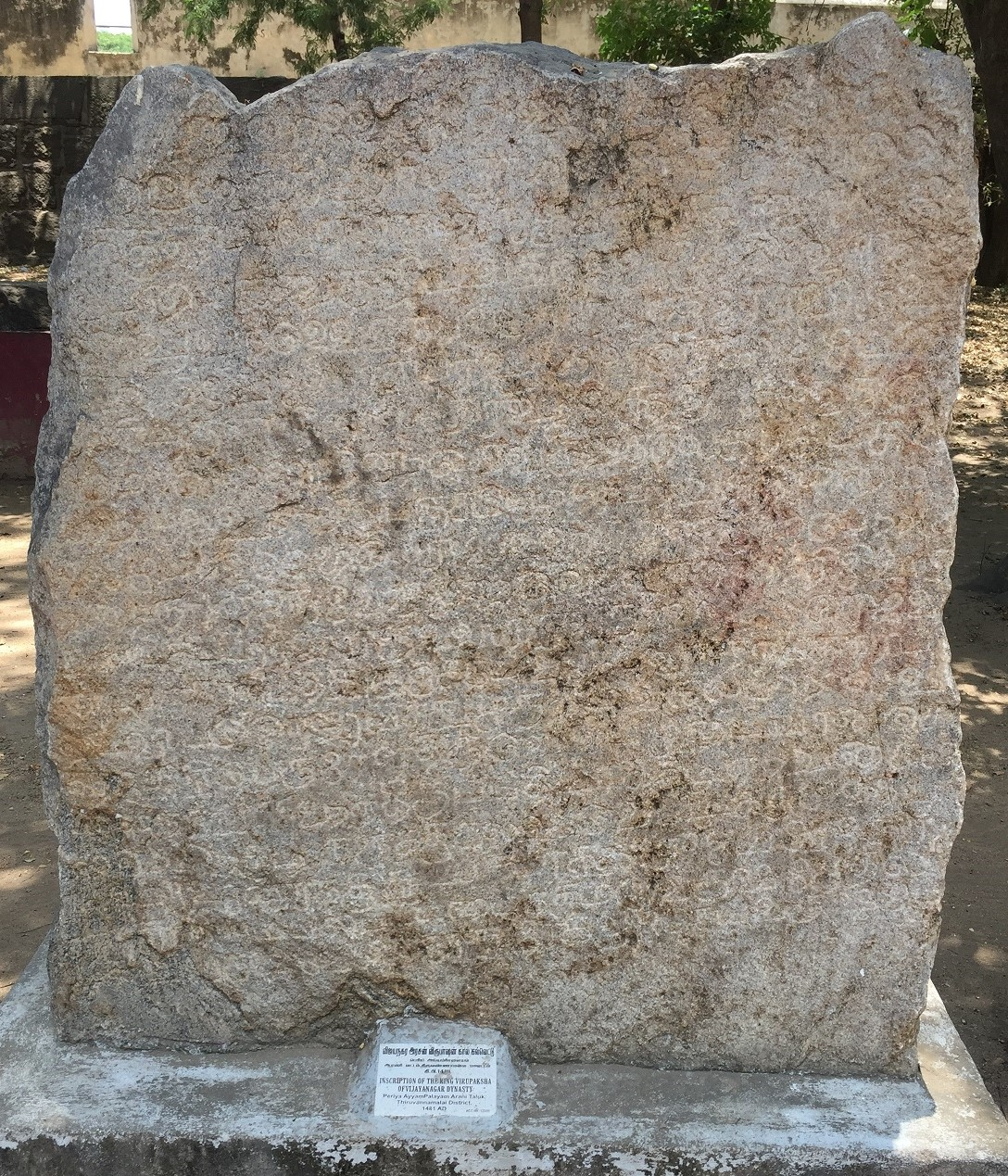
Major portions of the film were shot in Hampi and Vijaynagara

Principal photography began with the first schedule on 8 March 2025 in Hampi. Major portions were filmed in the arid regions of Vijaynagara in this schedule. Aryann shot an action sequence in the timespace between 12 and 14 March, which involved Karate. A trained karateka since 2005, he cited the form as "second mother", which accordingly transformed him. From 15 March, filming began in the Virupaksha Temple. The song "Jaatra Shubho Hok" was filmed in this schedule, portraying the adventurous journey of Kakababu. A footage of the song was leaked and went viral, prompting the film's official technology security partner to warn people against sharing leaked content or they would be deleted. A high-octane action sequence was shot on a coracle on the Tungabhadra river for five days, despite the temperature being 44 °C (111 °F). The "trademark action sequence of the Kakababu franchise" featuring Prosenjit in a single-handed fight scene with a crutch in another hand, was shot for three days. The schedule concluded on 19 March 2025.

The second schedule began on 30 March 2025. While the first schedule focused on the grandeur of the ruins, this phase was more focused on the mystery and the climax. A small portion of this schedule took place back at Hampi and Anegundi for specialized pickup shots and tunnel sequences that required specific lighting rigs. An action sequence was filmed in the early mornings for eight days to utilize the natural "Golden Hour" light that Ray preferred for the series' aesthetic, originally set by Srijit Mukherji. Pushan described this sequence as "out of the world". This schedule ended on 11 April 2025.

Following a brief break, the production quickly filmed sequences at a house in Kolkata in late-April. It was a 15 days' filming with Prosenjit and Aryann. To prioritise the filming, Aryann stepped down as the lead actor for the television series Video Bouma. The entry action sequence of Prosenjit was shot at Indian Museum in this schedule, whereas the production had secured rare access to shoot within the museum's restricted areas. Principal photography wrapped at the end of May.

== Music ==
Indraadip Dasgupta composed the music of the film. The film marks his tenth collaboration with Prosenjit after Mishawr Rawhoshyo, Hanuman.com (2013), Lorai (2015), Yeti Obhijaan, Kishore Kumar Junior (2018), Gumnaami (2019), Nirontor, Kakababur Protyaborton and Ajogyo (2024).

The first song "Jaatra Shubho Hok" was released on 5 January 2026. The second song "Kakababu Title Song" was released on 25 January 2026.

== Marketing ==
The teaser of Vijaynagar'er Hirey was exclusively attached to the prints of Raghu Dakat, Raktabeej 2 and Devi Chowdhurani for theatrical screenings, all of them released in Durga Puja. A poster of the film was released on 14 November 2025, on the occasion of children's day.

The teaser was officially unveiled on 25 December 2025, on the occasion of Christmas. A song launch event was arranged on 5 January 2026, where the song "Jaatra Shubho Hok" was released. On 7 January 2026, a clip was dropped, where Srijit Mukherji and Prosenjit seen discussing about their upcoming collaboration in a satirical manner, promoting Vijaynagar'er Hirey. The teaser was screened at the 55th edition of "The Statesman Vintage and Classic Car Rally" event at the polo ground of Royal Calcutta Turf Club on 11 January, where Prosenjit highlighted the importance of the rally in keeping the motoring heritage alive. He also took a round of the ground in a 1936 Bentley owned and driven by Shrivardhan Kanoria.

As a part of promotion, the team visited the Techno India Public School at Chuchura on 12 January 2026. The film received a U certificate from the Central Board of Film Certification (CBFC) on 14 January 2026, reinforcing the series’ positioning as a clean, family-friendly adventure brand. It was revealed having an approved runtime of 110 minutes, emerging as the shortest film in the franchise.

The trailer was launched at the Indian Museum on 18 January 2026. A number of events including rapid fire games and quiz contests were arranged for the children, as well as other attendees. On 19 January 2026, team visited the Narayana School in Howrah. As another part of the marketing campaign, the makers launched official merchandise of the film. They included prime dialogues, catchy quotes, song names and title of the film printed on T-shirts and hoodies.

Following its success, a special screening was arranged at PVR INOX, South City, which was attended by Ranjit Mallick, Prabhat Roy, Dev, Koel Mallick, Rituparna Sengupta, Abir Chatterjee, Subhashree Ganguly, Srijit Mukherji, Kaushik Ganguly, Raj Chakraborty, Nispal Singh, Rupam Islam, Anupam Roy, Ankush Hazra and Ishaa Saha. On the occasion of its theatrical 100 days completion, SVF arranged a success party at Nazrul Tirtha where the trailer of their then-upcoming Saptadingar Guptodhon was released.

== Release ==
=== Theatrical ===
Vijaynagar'er Hirey was initially slated for its release on 25 December 2025, coinciding with the Christmas window, but later was dropped to avoid clashing with three other films, including SVF's another production Lawho Gouranger Naam Rey (2025). Then the release date moved to 23 January 2026, on the occasions of Saraswati Puja and Netaji Jayanti. It was released alongside Bhanupriya Bhooter Hotel and Hok Kolorob.

== Reception ==
=== Box office ===
The film ran for over 100 days in theatres.

=== Critical reception ===
Anoushka Nag of Indulge Express reviewed the film on a positive note and wrote "This movie is a tribute to our Indian roots and heritage, to the art, the music and to its ancient stories. As a refreshing change, Indian culture was not used as a decoration but as a way to solve the mystery and the clues that lead way to the treasure." She also praised its screenplay, direction, and the whole cast's performance. Ankita Das of Ei Samay rated the film 3.5/5 stars and opined "It's difficult to describe how heroic Kakababu, who subdues villains while leaning on crutches, appears to the Gen Z' without witnessing it firsthand." She also praised the score by Dasgupta and addressed Chandrasish' directiorial style, citing "Chandrashish proves that the Kakababu franchise isn't into the hands of someone incompetent".

Bidisha Chatterjee of Sangbad Pratidin wrote "The new generation still has a tenuous connection with Bengali literature; whether they read the books or not, they know the titles, and the scene of them taking selfies with the books demonstrates the director's realistic approach. The film is perhaps also meant for those Bengalis who still maintain that faint connection with Bengali books". Citing Prosenjit as "a visual delight", Debleena Ghosh of Onyo Somoy Prime quoted "Chandrasish Ray has loaded Vijaynagar'er Hirey with a battalion of characters but he has ensured that all of them have their due scope to perform, even though some might have lesser screen time including Prosenjit Chatterjee". Divya Nair of Rediff.com rated the film 4.5 out of 5 stars and opined "Vijaynagar'er Hirey is drama, drama, drama all the way in which the director has not only bitten more than he can chew but exhibits his diehard admiration for Prosenjit Chatterjee". Raima Ganguly of The Times of India rated the film 3.5 out of 5 stars and wrote "The film benefits from its restrained use of music, allowing the atmosphere to do much of the work in building suspense. Once the story settles into its rhythm, the film leans comfortably on its strongest asset, Prosenjit Chatterjee’s Kakababu".

A critic for Aaro Ananda rated the film 3.5/5 stars and wrote "One glimpse of Prosenjit Chatterjee in Chandrasish Ray's Vijaynagar'er Hirey and you just know he is the G.O.A.T; in his mannerisms, speech, and acting, he is a character himself who has stepped right out of the pages of the book". Vishal Waghela of ALT Bollywood stated "Indraadip Dasgupta's music, especially the background score, plays a pivotal role in amplifying the overall experience of watching Kakababu on the big screen, apart from the terrific action sequences". Arpita Chowdhury of FirstPost rated the film 3.5/5 stars and noted "Vijaynagar'er Hirey is a film that celebrates Prosenjit Chatterjee for what he is. The star brings his trademark larger-than-life mannerisms into Chandrasish's quirky storytelling: a combination that works like a perfect charm." Rahul Mehta of Indian Community quoted "The film’s structure—moving from Kolkata’s urban chaos to Hampi’s ancient serenity—provides natural narrative rhythm. This visual grammar trains viewers to look closely, to see heritage as detective work. By the film’s end, you’re not just entertained; you’re genuinely curious about Vijayanagara architecture".

A reviewer of Calcutta Times noted "Vijaynagar'er Hirey opens with a graphics-heavy flashback that hints at Bengali cinema’s ongoing learning curve with visual effects".

== Future ==
In August 2025, when the film was already under post-production, an Instagram post by Srijit Mukherji sparked curiosity if he would be returning to direct the franchise' fifth instalment on the basis of Sunil Gangopadhyay's 1990 novel Ulka Rahasya, as he was spotted holding a script file in his hand entitled after the aforementioned novel. However, the director clarified nothing regarding the fact.

During a surprise hall-visit of Vijaynagar'er Hirey at Nandan on 13 February 2026, Prosenjit Chatterjee officially announced its sequel to be Bhoyongkar Shundor, with a first-look poster; it was the first time for a film as well as a sequel, to be announced in a theatre, where its previous part itself was running successfully contemporarily. Based on the 1971 novel of the same name, it is scheduled to be released in January 2027.
