= Mishawr Rawhoshyo =

2013 Indian Bengali film by Srijit Mukherji

- Theatrical release poster
- Directed by: Srijit Mukherji
- Based on: Mishor Rohosyo (1984 novel) by Sunil Gangopadhyay
- Screenplay by: Srijit Mukherji
- Dialogues by: Srijit Mukherji
- Story by: Sunil Gangopadhyay
- Produced by: Shree Venkatesh Films
- Starring: Prosenjit Chatterjee; Aryann Bhowmik; Indraneil Sengupta; Rajit Kapur; Rajesh Sharma; Neel Mukherjee; Swastika Mukherjee; Tridha Choudhury
- Cinematography: Soumik Haldar
- Edited by: Bodhaditya Banerjee
- Music by: Indraadip Dasgupta
- Production company: Shree Venkatesh Films
- Distributed by: Shree Venkatesh Films
- Release date: 11 October 2013
- Running time: 135 minutes
- Country: India
- Languages: Bengali; Hindi; English; Arabic
- Box office: ₹7.5 crore

Mishawr Rawhoshyo, (transl. The Mysteries of Egypt) is a 2013 Indian Bengali-language action-adventure film written and directed by Srijit Mukherji. Produced by Shrikant Mohta and Mahendra Soni under the banner of Shree Venkatesh Films, the film is based on the 1984 eponymous novel by Sunil Gangopadhyay, from his Kakababu series. It stars Prosenjit Chatterjee as Kakababu and Aryann Bhowmik as Shontu, alongside an ensemble cast of Indraneil Sengupta, Rajit Kapoor, Rajesh Sharma, Swastika Mukherjee, Sujan Neel Mukherjee and Tridha Chowdhury. The plot revolves around a hieroglyphic trail that leads Kakababu and his nephew Shontu to Egypt and underneath a pyramid.

The film was officially announced in September 2012, marking Srijit Mukherji's third collaboration with Prosenjit Chatterjee. Principal photography commenced in January 2013 and ended in August 2013. Major parts of the film were shot in Cairo with a sporadic schedule, and portions shot in Kolkata and Delhi predominantly. Indraadip Dasgupta composed its music, with lyrics penned by Srijato. The cinematography and editing of the film were handled by Soumik Halder and Bodhaditya Banerjee respectively.

Mishawr Rawhoshyo was theatrically released on 11 October 2013, coinciding with Durga Puja. It opened along with the dubbed versions in Hindi, English and Arabic to positive reviews, and emerged as the second highest-grossing films of 2013, with highly positive reviews. Generally attaining a strong cult following, the film was praised for its set-pieces, cast performances, songs and action sequences. At the 1st Filmfare Awards East, Mishawr Rawhoshyo received 5 nominations, including Best Film and Best Actor (Prosenjit). It is the first installment in SVF Kakababu franchise, followed by Yeti Obhijaan (2017), Kakababur Protyaborton (2022) and Vijaynagar'er Hirey (2026).

== Plot ==
Mishawr Rawhoshyo starts with Kakababu and his nephew Shontu smiling after watching news informing of the imminent overthrow of the dictatorship in Egypt.

The film rewinds into a flashback. It is 2010. Kakababu is contracted by Egyptian businessman Al Mamun to decipher the meanings of hieroglyphic symbols that his teacher, Mufti Muhammad, had drawn on a piece of paper supposedly during his sleep. Muhammad is terminally ill and is about to grant his last wish while he is being treated in Delhi. Mamun thinks that the symbols are the key to locating Mufti Muhammad's will which will describe where to find treasures Mufti Muhammad had acquired during his tenure as a political leader and revolutionary. However, Kakababu is convinced that the symbols have a different meaning and they are very unusual. Mufti Muhammad symbolically requests Kakababu to verify something, a very unusual last wish.

Meanwhile, a war of rivalry ensues between Mamun and Hani Al Qadi, another of Mufti Muhammad's disciples (and a rival of Mamun) who accuses Mamun of stealing a secret that isn't rightfully his. While in Delhi, there was an attempt to murder Kakababu, in which Kakababu was injured. Kakababu took the challenge to uncover the truth; he and his nephew Shontu head to Egypt where they are drawn into the vortex of the mystery.

Kakababu gets kidnapped by Al Qadi's men which sets off a chain of events, culminating in a climax under a pyramid. Inside the pyramid, Kakababu discovers the lost mummy of an Egyptian queen with the help of the hieroglyphics code written by Mufti Muhammad. The present-day political turmoil in Egypt subtly reverberates. At the end, Kakababu gives Hani Al Qadi the coded message written inside the coffin of the mummy and wishes him good luck for his upcoming revolution to free Egypt from the corrupt dictator Jashni Mubarak (fictionalized Hosni Mubarak).

== Cast ==
- Prosenjit Chatterjee as Raja Roy Chowdhury alias Kakababu
- Aryann Bhowmik as Sunanda Roy Chowdhury alias Shontu, Kakababu's nephew
- Indraneil Sengupta as Hani Al Qadi
- Rajit Kapur as Al Mamun
- Rajesh Sharma as CBI officer Narendra Verma
- Neel Mukherjee as Siddhartha
- Swastika Mukherjee as Snigdha
- Tridha Choudhury as Rini
- Barun Chanda as Mufti Mohammad (cameo appearance)
- Kamaleshwar Mukherjee as Sadat Manto (cameo appearance)
- Biswajit Chakraborty as Kakababu's elder brother and Shontu's father
- Tulika Bose as Kakababu's sister-in-law and Shontu's mother
- Indranath Mukherjee as himself at JNU

== Development ==
Srijit Mukherji licensed the first three books in the Kakababu series with the intent to produce a film every other year starring Prosenjit Chatterjee as Kakababu, his only choice for the role. Filming took place in Cairo, Egypt and Delhi in early 2013, with Chatterjee stating that Mukherji was updating the character to be more contemporary. Chatterjee also commented that, although they had not changed Ganguly's character too much, that "lookwise he is a modern Kakababu."

The movie also features Rabindranath Tagore's famous poem Chitto Jetha Bhayshunyo.

== Soundtrack ==
Mishawr Rawhoshyo

Soundtrack album by Indraadip Dasgupta
- Released: 2 October 2013
- Genre: Soundtrack
- Length: 33:03
- Label: Shree Venkatesh Films
- Producer: Indraadip Dasgupta

Indraadip Dasgupta chronology
| Proloy (2013) | Mishawr Rawhoshyo (2013) | Golpo Holeo Shotti (2014) |

The soundtrack consists of six tracks composed by Indraadip Dasgupta with lyrics by Srijato. It was released on 2 October 2013 by the cast and crew in the Oberoi Grand Hotel in Kolkata.

Track listing
| No. | Title | Singer(s) | Length |
|---|---|---|---|
| 1. | "Kakababur Gaan" | Rupam Islam | 5:31 |
| 2. | "Baalir Shawhor" | Shreya Ghoshal, Arijit Singh | 5:51 |
| 3. | "Kyano Aaj" | Shreya Ghoshal | 5:21 |
| 4. | "Dilli" | Arijit Singh, Shadaab Faridi | 5:05 |
| 5. | "Kakababur Gaan (reprise)" | Anupam Roy | 5:20 |
| 6. | "Hani Alkadi R Gaan" | Sonu Nigam | 5:55 |
| Total length: | | | 33:03 |

=== Critical response ===
Sutapa Singha writing for The Times of India gave a rating of and said the album is like an audio window to the gripping thriller on-screen.

== Reception ==
Mishawr Rawhoshyo garnered mixed to generally positive reviews from critics. Gautam Chakraborty of Anandabazar Patrika rated it. Dippanita Mukhopadhay Ghosh of Ebela rated it.

== Awards and nominations ==
| Award | Ceremony date | Category | Recipient(s) | Result | Ref |
|---|---|---|---|---|---|
| Zee Bangla Gaurav Samman | 23 March 2014 | Superhit Film of the Year | Mishawr Rawhoshyo | Nominated | |
| Zee Bangla Gaurav Samman | 23 March 2014 | Best Director | Srijit Mukherji | Nominated | |
| Zee Bangla Gaurav Samman | 23 March 2014 | Best Actor (Male) | Prosenjit Chatterjee | Nominated | |
| Zee Bangla Gaurav Samman | 23 March 2014 | Best Actor in a Supporting Role (Male) | Indraneil Sengupta | Nominated | |
| Zee Bangla Gaurav Samman | 23 March 2014 | Best Actor in a Negative Role | Rajit Kapur | Nominated | |
| Zee Bangla Gaurav Samman | 23 March 2014 | Best Music Director | Indraadip Dasgupta | Nominated | |
| Filmfare Awards East | 29 March 2014 | Best Film | Mishawr Rawhoshyo | Nominated | |
| Filmfare Awards East | 29 March 2014 | Best Actor | Prosenjit Chatterjee | Nominated | |
| Filmfare Awards East | 29 March 2014 | Best Actor in a Supporting Role (Male) | Indraneil Sengupta | Won | |
| Filmfare Awards East | 29 March 2014 | Best Lyricist | Srijato – "Baalir Shawhor" | Nominated | |
| Filmfare Awards East | 29 March 2014 | Best Female Playback Singer | Shreya Ghoshal – "Baalir Shawhor" | Nominated | |

== Sequel ==
The sequel Yeti Obhijaan was released in 2017. The second sequel Kakababur Protyaborton was released in 2022.
