= Yeti Obhijaan =

2017 Indian Bengali adventure film directed by Srijit Mukherji

- Theatrical release poster
- Directed by: Srijit Mukherji
- Based on: Paharchuraye Aatanka by Sunil Gangopadhyay
- Screenplay by: Srijit Mukherji
- Dialogues by: Srijit Mukherji
- Story by: Sunil Gangopadhyay
- Produced by: Shrikant Mohta; Mahendra Soni
- Starring: Prosenjit Chatterjee; Aryann Bhowmik; Jisshu Sengupta; Ferdous Ahmed; Bidya Sinha Mim
- Cinematography: Soumik Halder
- Edited by: Rick Basu
- Music by: Indraadip Dasgupta
- Production company: Shree Venkatesh Films
- Distributed by: Shree Venkatesh Films
- Release dates: 22 September 2017 (India); 24 November 2017 (Bangladesh)
- Running time: 121 minutes
- Country: India
- Language: Bengali
- Budget: ₹4 crore
- Box office: est.₹8.55 crore

Yeti Obhijaan (transl. Adventures revolving the Abominable Snowman) is a 2017 Indian Bengali-language action-adventure film co-written and directed by Srijit Mukherji. Produced by Shrikant Mohta and Mahendra Soni under the banner of Shree Venkatesh Films, the film is based on the 1980 novel Paharchuraye Aatanka by Sunil Gangopadyay. It serves as the direct sequel to Mishawr Rawhoshyo (2013), as well as the second installment in Mukherji's own Kakababu franchise. It stars Prosenjit Chatterjee as Kakababu and Aryann Bhowmik as Shontu, alongside Jisshu Sengupta, Ferdous Ahmed, Bidya Sinha Saha Mim and Alexx O'Nell in lead roles. The narrative follows Kakababu and Shontu uncovering the sightings of the mythical beast Yeti.

The film was officially announced in November 2016, marking Mukherji's sixth collaboration with Chatterjee. Principal photography commenced in January 2017 and ended in July 2017. Major parts of the film were shot in Switzerland with a sporadic schedule, while the original story was plotted in Nepal, with portions shot in Kolkata. Music of the film is composed by Indraadip Dasgupta, with lyrics penned by Srijato. The cinematography and editing of the film were handled by Soumik Halder and Rick Basu respectively.

Released on 22 September 2017, coinciding with Durga Puja, Yeti Obhijaan opened along with the dubbed versions in Hindi, English and Nepali to mixed reviews from critics, with praise directed at its action set-pieces, cinematography, soundtrack, and performances—particularly that of Chatterjee, though some criticism was aimed at the screenplay and pacing. The film emerged as a major commercial success, grossing over ₹8.55 crore, with a budget of ₹4 crore. It became the second highest-grossing film of 2017 after Amazon Obhijaan (2017).

At the 3rd Filmfare Awards East, Yeti Obhijaan received four nominations, including Best Actor (Chatterjee) and Best Supporting Actor (Bhowmik).

A sequel, Kakababur Protyaborton, was released on 4 February 2022, as the third installment of the franchise.

== Plot ==
After the mysterious disappearance of mountaineer Caine Shipton, rumours of the giant beast Yeti are spread all over the world. Kakababu and Sontu embark on an adventurous journey to Gorokhshep Plateau at the base of Mount Everest to unveil the mystery. With the help of Nepali special force officers Jang Bahadur Rana and Tribhuban Gupta and loyal sherpa Mingma, they expose the illegal ventures going on under the caves of the mountain, with Caine Shipton himself being the mastermind behind it.

== Cast ==
- Prosenjit Chatterjee as Raja Roy Chowdhury alias Kakababu
- Aryann Bhowmik as Sunanda Roy Chowdhury alias Shontu
- Bidya Sinha Saha Mim as Chitrangada Verma
- Ferdous as Thomas Tribhuvan Gupta
- Alexx O'Nell as Caine Shipton
- Pushan Dasgupta as Jojo
- Nima Norbu Lama as Mingma
- Debopriyo Mukherjee as Norbu
- Shaun Robinson as Prof. Koeningswald
- Isabella Gibbs as Koeningswald's wife
- Robert Lee as Chinese prisoner
- Sagar Thapa as Rana's assistant
- Tapan Adhikari as Yeti
- Khosru Parvez as Brigadier Birendra

=== Special appearance ===
- Jisshu Sengupta as Jung Bahadur Rana
- Tridha Choudhury as Rini
- Biswajit Chakraborty as Shontu's father
- Tulika Basu as Shontu's mother

== Production ==
=== Development ===
In 2012, Srijit Mukherji had licensed three stories from Sunil Gangopadhyay's Kakababu series, one of which was Paharchuraye Aatanka.

Yeti Obhijaan is produced by Shree Venkatesh Films. The film was originally intended to be a joint venture between India and Bangladesh, with the production company Jaaz Multimedia set to serve as the Bangladeshi co-producer, and this would eventually lead to the casting of Bangladeshi actors Ferdous Ahmed and Bidya Sinha Saha Mim. However, due to conflicts with filming, Jaaz Multimedia removed their investment and the film became solely an Indian film.

The film was shot in India and Switzerland.

== Release ==
Yeti Obhijaan released on Durga Puja 2017. This is the first 3D film of Bengal, but will now witness a 2D release due to some infrastructure constraints. The sole reason for the same is the lack of sufficient 3D screens in West Bengal. As per multiplex reports, a 3D version of a film always has a better pull than its 2D version.

== Soundtrack ==
Yeti Obhijaan

Soundtrack album by Indraadip Dasgupta
- Released: 25 September 2017
- Genre: Soundtrack
- Language: Bengali
- Label: SVF
- Producer: Indraadip Dasgupta

Indraadip Dasgupta chronology
Chaya O Chobi (2017)	Yeti Obhijaan (2017)	Kabir (2018)

Singles from Yeti Obhijaan
- 1. "Kakababur Obhijaan" Released: 3 September 2017; 2. "Jete Hawbe" Released: 15 September 2017

The songs and background score of Yeti Obhijaan are composed by Indradeep Dasgupta. All songs are sung by Arijit Singh, Rupam Islam, Anupam Roy and Papon. The first song "Kakababur Obhijaan" was released on 3 September 2017. The second single from the soundtrack, "Jete Hawbe", released on 15 September.

All music is composed by Indraadip Dasgupta.

No.	Title	Lyrics	Artist(s)	Length
1.	"Kakababur Obhijaan"	Prasen	Arijit Singh, Anupam Roy, Rupam Islam	6:14
2.	"Jete Hawbe"	Srijit Mukherjee	Papon	6:11

== Reception ==
=== Critical reception ===
Yeti Obhijaan received positive review from critics who praised its cast performances, cinematography, action sequences, and musical score but criticized its writing development. On the review aggregator website Rotten Tomatoes, 86% of 38 critics' reviews are positive, with an average rating of 7.5/10. The website's consensus reads: "Packed with plot twists and breathtaking action, Yeti Obhijaan manages its convoluted plot and imposing length with high-octane panache."

Shamayita Chakraborty of The Times of India rated the film 2.5 out of 5 stars and commented, "On the whole, Yeti Obhijaan is disappointing. Pahar Churay Aatonko is one of the best Kakababu adventures and it is sad to see our childhood nostalgia snuffed out on screen. It is too early to say that Srijit Mukherjee has lost his mojo, but his storytelling is a shadow of what it used to be a few years back." She also added that the film lost its glory, also failing to thrill. Bhaskar Chattopadhyay of Firstpost reviewed the film and wrote "The photography of the snow-covered peaks and the clear blue skies are breathtakingly beautiful, the drone shots executed with great affection and the cinematography extremely commendable. The weakest element of the film is its writing, while Prosenjit Chatterjee pulls off all these delivering the strongest punch. He does his best to carry the film on his shoulders, the performances by most of the other actors make sure his genuine efforts go nowhere." Bidisha Chatterjee of Sangbad Pratidin quoted "There are mountains, snow on its peaks, but the fear is missing and if you want to feel it, you should read the original story."

Arup Ratan Samajdar of Kaahon Archive mentioned the film as "an Himalayan emptiness" in his review and wrote "A synthetic texture of multiple layers of sound effects has become the dominant practice in mainstream films all over the world. The film lacks the thrill that is largely born out of the overwhelming silence one’d experience sitting idle for 15 days at an altitude of almost 20,000 feet at the Himalayas." Bhaswati Ghosh of Ei Samay gave the film a rating of 3.5 out of 5 stars and wrote, "Prosenjit Chatterjee's weathered intensity, grizzly charisma and trademark wit lends the film's all-out, devil-may-care antics a sense of purpose that evades mindless acts of mayhem". The film was rated 3.5/5 stars and termed as a "massy, meaningful actioner" by Agnivo Niyogi of Aaganz World. He wrote "Yeti Obhijaan steers clear of these shortcomings and in a signature-Srijit style presents an exhilarating thriller that would be palatable for anyone from 8 to 80. Prosenjit Chatterjee gets in to the skin of the character and makes it his own. His silent stares, signature limp, and quintessential Bangaliana will keep you on the edge of your seats."

Shoma A. Chatterji of Filmfare rated the film 4 out of 5 stars and called it a "visual spectacle" while also opining that the action choreography was "truly out of this world".

== Sequel ==
The third sequel of the Kakababu franchise, Kakababur Protyaborton, released in 2022.
