= Kakababu =

Bengali fictional character

- First appearance: Bhoyonkor Sundor
- Last appearance: Golokdhandhay Kakababu
- Created by: Sunil Gangopadhyay
- Portrayed by: Samit Bhanja; Sabyasachi Chakrabarty; Sudip Mukherjee; Sumanta Mukherjee; Prasenjit Chatterjee; Arjun Chakraborty

In-universe information
- Alias: Raja Roy Chowdhury (রাজা রায়চৌধুরী)
- Species: Human
- Gender: Male
- Title: Kakababu
- Occupation: Researcher, Adventurer
- Family: Sunanda Roy Chowdhury/Sontu (nephew)
- Spouse: Unmarried
- Significant others: Santu (nephew and sidekick)
- Children: None
- Nationality: Indian
- Family origin: East Bengal

Kakababu, or Raja Roy Chowdhury, is a fictional adventurer created by Bengali author Sunil Gangopadhyay. The series debuted in the 1971 Puja issue of Anandamela magazine with Bhoyonkor Sundor, and quickly became a hit among teenagers. The series continued for 33 years, resulting in over 36 adventure novels until the author's death in 2012.

== Main characters ==
- Kakababu: Kakababu is the disabled former Director of the Archaeological Survey of India, whose real name is Raja Roychowdhury. He is from a migrated Bengali family. His family origin was from East Bengal. In one of the earlier stories, it is said that Kakababu lost one leg in a jeep accident in Afghanistan, several years ago, and walks with the help of a crutch. However, in Kakababur Prothom Abhijan, it is revealed that Kakababu lost his leg when he jumped off a cliff to help his friend Kamal. This accident however has not crippled his strong mental will and physical strength. He is much sought after by the Indian intelligence to solve critical cases of crime. He has worked in CBI for some years as an advisor. He has been trapped and captured by enemies on several occasions, but escaped unhurt, or nominally hurt. In solving cases of crime, he has traveled to several parts of India and the world. Each new adventure takes him to a new destination. He is excellent in fencing, revolver shooting, and swimming. His age is estimated to be over 60 at present. On a few occasions, he used the crutch as a weapon.
- Sontu: (Also spelled as Shontu) Real name is Sunanda Roychowdhury. Who first studies in Tirthapati Institution and after that in Ballygunge Govt. School. The only college-going nephew of Kakababu, and the companion to all Kakababu adventures. This young adult has sharp wit and intelligence, and his mental strength is only comparable to Kakababu. He has also been trapped on several occasions by ruthless enemies. He is an excellent swimmer and an outstanding athlete. He is the best friend of Jojo.
- Jojo: Real name is Rajat Bhattacharya (as mentioned in "Santu o Ek Tukro Chaand") The best friend of Shantu and equals his age and they both studied in Presidency College. He was very close to Kakababu like Shantu and Jojo also loves him a lot. He was introduced as a character to give comic relief, resulting from his habit of telling lies but not for bad will, but creating imaginary stories about his dramatic life experiences with his astrologer father.
- Biman Banerjee: A pilot of Air India, neighbour of Kakababu and Sontu. He got involved in some of Kakababu's adventures like Khali Jahajer Rahasya, Kakababu Here Gelen? etc.
- Siddhartha & Snigdha: Neighbours of Kakababu and Sontu. They along with Rini got involved in some of Kakababu's adventures.
- Rini: Another friend of Shantu. She is a neighbour of Shantu and Kakababu.
- Deblina: Friend of Sontu and Jojo
- Rupkatha: also known as Oli, is another female friend of Shantu and Jojo.
- Narendra Verma: A veteran I.P.S. of Indian Government and top-ranked Central Bureau of Investigation officer, helps Kakababu in many adventures. He is a friend of Kakababu.

== Adventures of Kakababu Sontu ==
1. Bhoyonkor Sundor (1971)
2. Sobuj Dwiper Raja (1976)
3. Paharchuray Aatonko (1979–80)
4. Bhopal Rohosyo (1982)
5. Jongolgorer Chaabi (1982–83)
6. Khali Jahajer Rohosyo (1983)
7. Mishor Rohosyo (1984)
8. Kolkatar Jongole (1985)
9. Jongoler Modhye Ek Hotel (1986)
10. Nilmurti Rohosyo (1986–87)
11. Rajbarir Rohosyo (1987)
12. Bijoynogorer Hire (1988)
13. Kakababu O Bajralama (1989)
14. Ulka Rohosyo (1990)
15. Mohakaler Likhon (1990)
16. Ekti Lal Lanka (1991)
17. Kakababu Here Gelen? (1991)
18. Sadhubabar Haat (1992)
19. Sontu O Ektukro Chaand (1992)
20. Aagun Pakhir Rohosyo (1993)
21. Kakababu Bonam Chorashikari (1994)
22. Sontu Kothay Kakababu Kothay (1995)
23. Pori (1996)
24. Kakababur Prothom Obhijan (1996)
25. Kakababu Bonam Murtichor (1997)
26. Jojo Odrishyo (1997)
27. Kakababu O Chondon Dosyu (1998)
28. Kakababu O Ek Chhoddobeshi (1999)
29. Kakababu O Shishuchorer Dol (2000)
30. Kakababu O Moronfaad (2001)
31. Jojo-Sontur Golpo, Kakababur Uttor (2002)
32. Kakababu O Black panther (2002)
33. Kakababu O Aaschorjo Dwip (2003)
34. Kakababu O Sinduk Rohosyo (2004)
35. Kakababu O Ekti Sada Ghora (2005)
36. Ebar Kakababur Protisodh (2006)
37. Kakababur Chokhe Jol (2007)
38. Kakababu aar Bagher Golpo (2008)
39. Aagneyogirir Peter Modhye (2009)
40. Aarobdeshe Sontu Kakababu (2010)
41. Kakababu O Jalodassu (2011)
42. Golokdhandhay Kakababu (2012)

== Kakababu in Other mediums ==
The first three films in the list are the Kakababu Original film series. The later are Shree Venkatesh's film series.

Number	Title	IMDB	Year	Kakababu portrayed by
1	Sabuj Dwiper Raja	Sabuj Dwiper Raja	1979	Samit Bhanja
2	Kakababu Here Gelen?	Kakababu Here Gelen?	1996	Sabyasachi Chakrabarty
3	Ek Tukro Chand	Ek Tukro Chand	2001	Sabyasachi Chakrabarty
4	Mishor Rohoshyo	Mishawr Rawhoshyo	2013	Prosenjit Chatterjee
5	Yeti Obhijaan	Yeti Obhijaan	2017	Prosenjit Chatterjee
6	Kakababur Protyaborton	Kakababur Protyaborton	2021	Prosenjit Chatterjee
7	Vijaynagar'er Hirey		2026	Prosenjit Chatterjee

=== Television ===
==== Live-action series ====
- Khali Jahajer Rahasya (1999), Directed by Surojit Sengupto aired on DD Bangla as a 13 episodes TV Series. Kakababu was played by Sabyasachi Chakrabarty. The TV series was a part of the Kakababu original film series.
- Kakababu Firey Elen (2008–2009) was a TV mini-series made for DD Bangla. Directed by Subrata Das, Sudip Mukherjee as Kakababu, Debshankar Haldar as Rajkumar and Saheb Bhattacharya as Santu.

==== Animated series ====
In October 2010 an animated series by the name of Kakababu-Sontu began airing in Ruposhi Bangla.

==== Telefilm ====
- Kakababu o Ek Chadmabeshi (2001), was TV film made for ETV Bangla, directed by Joy Mukherjee aired on ETV Bangla. Kakababu was played by Arjun Chakraborty and Santu was played by Sumon Banerjee.
- Rajbarir Rahashya, Kolkatar Jongoley, Sinduk Rahashya. The character Kakababu was played by Sumanta Mukhopadhyay aired on Akash Bangla. Deboleena was played by Mumtaz Sorcar.

== See also ==
- Kakababu in other media
- Feluda
- Feluda in film
- Professor Shonku
- Byomkesh Bakshi
- Byomkesh Bakshi in other media
- Private investigator
- Culture of Bengal
- Culture of West Bengal
- Bengali literature
- History of Bengali literature
- List of Bengali-language authors (chronological)
