= Kakababu in other media =

Many films, television and comic book adaptation has been made with Sunil Gangopadhyay's Kakababu character. Here are the list of some other media adaptation.

== Films ==
=== Standalone films ===
==== Sabuj Dwiper Raja (1979) ====
This is the first feature film based on Kakababu, which is directed by Tapan Sinha. Kakababu was played by Samit Bhanja and Shontu was played by Arunavo Adhikari.

==== Kakababu Here Gelen? (1995) ====
Directed by Pinaki Chaudhuri, Kakababu and Shontu's character was played by Sabyasachi Chakrabarty and Arghya Chakraborty respectively.

==== Ek Tukro Chand (2001) ====
Directed by Pinaki Chaudhuri, this film is the sequel to 1996 film Kakababu Here Gelen?. Kakababu's role was reprised by Sabyasachi Chakrabarty and Shontu's character was portrayed by Soham Chakraborty.

=== SVF Kakababu franchise ===
==== Mishawr Rawhoshyo (2013) ====
Directed by Srijit Mukherji, based on the novel of same name. Kakababu and Shontu's character was played by Prosenjit Chatterjee and Aryann Bhowmik respectively. Director Srijit Mukherji said this is the first film of a trilogy film series.

==== Yeti Obhijaan (2017) ====
After Mishawr Rawhoshyo, while the makers were planning about the sequel, Director Srijit Mukherji told about next Kakababu film to The Telegraph: "We’ve planned three. Actually I wanted to make a trilogy — a desert, a mountain and a jungle. The desert is done. Most probably we’re looking at mountain after this, which could be Kakababu Bajra Lama, Paharchuray Aatonko or Bhayankar Sundor. One in Sikkim, one in the basecamp of the Everest, kind of a difficult shoot, and Kashmir, also a difficult shoot".

In December 2014, director Srijit Mukherji said: "Yes, it's Paharchuray Aatonko next. Since we'll be shooting in the mountains, summer is the best time. We'll start in May and wrap up by June, before it begins to rain. The shoot is going to be difficult, as the actors will have to be hand-in-glove with mountaineering. I've spoken to Bumbada ( Prosenjit Chatterjee) about the dates. DoP Soumik Halder's dates have also been locked".

==== Kakababur Protyaborton (2022) ====
This film was shot in the forest based on Jongoler Modhye Ek Hotele. It is released on 4 February 2022.

==== Vijaynagar'er Hirey (2026) ====
This film is based on the same name novel of Sunil Gangopadhyay published in 1988. Chandrasish Ray is the director of the film.

== Television series ==
=== Live-action ===
==== Khali Jahajer Rahasya (1999) ====
Directed by Surojit Sengupto aired on DD Bangla as a 13 episodes TV Series. In Khali Jahajer Rahasya, Kakababu was played by Sabyasachi Chakrabarty as usual. Shontu was played by Bijoyesh Chakrabarty and Biman was played by Tota Roy Chowdhury.

==== Kakababu O Ek Chadmabeshi (2001) ====
Directed by Joy Mukherjee aired on ETV Bangla. Kakababu was played by Arjun Chakraborty and Shontu was played by Sumon Banerjee.

==== Kakababu Firey Elen (2008-2009) ====
Based on the Novel Kolkatar Jongoley, the screenplay devised and directed by Subrata Das, screenplay by- Aditi Mazumder, Anuja Chattopadhyay and Subrata Das. Aired on DD Bangla. Cast: Sudip Mukherjee as Kakababu, Debshankar Haldar as Rajkumar, Saheb Bhattacharya as Santu, Nabonita Dey as Debolina, Taranga Sarkar as Jojo, Arnab Bhadra as Biman and Rajatava Dutta as Mr. Mallick.

=== Animated ===
==== Kakababu-Sontu (2010) ====
In October'2010 onwards Ruposhi Bangla channel has started Kakababu-Sontu as animation series first time ever in Bangla Entertainment. Animated avatar of Kakababu & Sontu visited Egypt (Mishor Rohosyo) to solve a mystery related to a mummy hidden below a pyramid. Then they went to Kashmir (Mission Kashmir aka Bhoyonkor Sundor) in the search of the lost head of King Konishko's statue. Later on they headed towards Andaman to solve the famous mystery of Sobuj Dwip (Sobuj Dwiper Raja). In this adventure both ex-chief minister Buddhadeb Bhattacharjee and Chief Minister Mamata Banerjee was seen in their animation avatar. In January 2011 Kakababu solved the mystery of Kein Shipton and a group of mysterious Yeti (Paharchuray Aatonko) and then he went to Africa to solve the case of some missing persons from a particular hotel (Bhoyonkor Africa aka Jongoler Modhye Ek Hotel). In March'2011, Sontu's friend Jojo is introduced in the adventure Bijoynogorer Hire but then in April'2011, when Kakababu faced Bozrolama (Bozrolama Rahasya based on Kakababu O Bozrolama) he takes only Sontu with him. After Bozrolama, he confronts Chondondossu (smugglers of sandalwood) in a dense forest of Karnatak (Chondondossur Mukhomukhi based on Kakababu O Chondondossu).

== Telefilms ==
=== Rajbarir Rahashya ===
In this telefilm Kakababu's character was played by Sumanta Mukherjee.

=== Kolkatar Jongoley ===
Sumanta Chatterjee reprised the role of Kakababu.

== Cast and characters ==
Character	Films							TV series				Telefilms	
Character	Single film	Pinaki Chaudhuri series		SVF Kakababu franchise				Live-action			Animated		
Character	Single film	Pinaki Chaudhuri series		Srijit Mukherji series			Chandrasish Ray series						
Character	Sabuj Dwiper Raja (1973)	Kakababu Here Gelen? (1995)	Ek Tukro Chand (2001)	Mishawr Rawhoshyo (2013)	Yeti Obhijaan (2017)	Kakababur Protyaborton (2022)	Vijaynagar'er Hirey (2026)	Khali Jahajer Rahasya (1999)	Kakababu O Ek Chadmabeshi (2001)	Kakababu Firey Elen (2008-2009)	Kakababu-Sontu (2010)	Rajbarir Rahashya	Kolkatar Jongoley
Raja Roy Chowdhury Kakababu	Samit Bhanja	Sabyasachi Chakrabarty	Sabyasachi Chakrabarty	Prosenjit Chatterjee	Prosenjit Chatterjee	Prosenjit Chatterjee	Prosenjit Chatterjee	Sabyasachi Chakrabarty	Arjun Chakraborty	Sudip Mukherjee	Animated	Sumanta Mukherjee	Sumanta Mukherjee
Sunanda Roy Chowdhury Shontu	Arunavo Adhikari	Arghyo Chakraborty	Soham Chakraborty	Aryann Bhowmik	Aryann Bhowmik	Aryann Bhowmik	Aryann Bhowmik	Bijoyesh Chakraborty	Suman Banerjee	Saheb Bhattacharya	Animated	Unknown	Unknown
Biman		Kushal Chakraborty						Tota Roy Chowdhury		Arnab Bhadra	Animated		
Asit Dhar		Soumitra Chatterjee											
Simon Bubumba			Mrinal Mukherjee										
Hani Al Qadi				Indraneil Sengupta							Animated		
Al Mamun				Rajit Kapur							Animated		
Narendra Verma				Rajesh Sharma							Animated		
Rini				Tridha Choudhury							Animated		
Siddhartha				Neel Mukherjee							Animated		
Snigdha				Swastika Mukherjee							Animated		
Mufti Mohammad				Barun Chanda							Animated		
Sadat Manto				Kamaleshwar Mukherjee (cameo)							Animated		
Jung Bahadur Rana					Jisshu Sengupta						Animated		
Chitrangada Verma					Bidya Sinha Saha Mim						Animated		
Thomas Tribhuvan Gupta					Ferdous Ahmed						Animated		
Caine Shipton					Alexx O'Nell						Animated		
Norbu					Debopriyo Mukherjee						Animated		
Amal Dey						Anirban Chakrabarti							
Jojo							Pushan Dasgupta			Taranga Sarkar	Animated		
B. P. Sharma							Chiranjeet Chakraborty						
Ranjan Ghosal							Satyam Bhattacharya						
Rinku							Sreya Bhattacharya						
Raya							Rajnandini Paul						
Mohan Singh							Anujoy Chatterjee						
Debolina Dutta										Nabonita Dey	Animated		
Rajkumar										Debshankar Haldar			
Mr. Mallick										Rajatava Dutta			

== Comics ==
Art by Bijon Karmakar, published by Ananda Publishers:

- Bhoyonkor Sundor.
- Kolkatar Jongoley.

== See also ==
- Feluda
- Feluda in other media
- Byomkesh Bakshi
- Byomkesh Bakshi in other media
- Tarini khuro
- Tarini Khuro in other media
