= Kakababur Protyaborton =

2022 Indian Bengali-language film by Srijit Mukherji

- First look poster
- Directed by: Srijit Mukherji
- Screenplay by: Srijit Mukherji
- Story by: Sunil Gangopadhyay
- Based on: Jongoler Modhya Ek Hotel by Sunil Gangopadhyay
- Produced by: Shrikant Mohta; Mahendra Soni
- Starring: Prosenjit Chatterjee; Aryann Bhowmik; Anirban Chakraborty
- Cinematography: Soumik Haldar
- Music by: Indraadip Dasgupta
- Production company: Shree Venkatesh Films
- Distributed by: Shree Venkatesh Films
- Release date: 4 February 2022
- Running time: 136 minutes
- Country: India
- Language: Bengali

Kakababur Protyaborton (transl. The return of Kakababu) is a 2022 Indian Bengali-language action-adventure film written and directed by Srijit Mukherji. Produced by Shrikant Mohta and Mahendra Soni under the banner of Shree Venkatesh Films, the film is based on Sunil Gangopadhyay's 1986 novel Jongoler Modhye Ek Hotel from his Kakababu series. The narrative follows Kakababu and Shontu to Kenya, where they look into the mysterious disappearance of German tourists at a resort in Masai Mara.

A sequel to the 2017 film Yeti Obhijaan, the film serves as the third instalment in the SVF Kakababu Franchise. It stars Prosenjit Chatterjee and Aryann Bhowmik reprising their roles as Kakababu and Shontu respectively, alongside Anirban Chakrabarti in the lead roles.

Kakababur Protyaborton was released on 4 February 2022. It opened to mixed reviews from critics and audience, praising the cast performances, music, action sequences and visuals, and criticising for its narrative style, writing, and runtime. A sequel, Vijaynagar'er Hirey, was released in 2026, serving as the fourth instalment.

== Plot ==
Raja Roy Chowdhury alias Kakababu and his nephew, young Santu take a trip to Kenya, Africa. On reaching their destination for a vacation, they get along with a Bengali man, Amal and learn that the hotel is going through a change of ownership along with a string of problems. Their vacation starts on a disturbing note when Kakababu receives a threat call from a stranger but he ignores it. On speaking to the current owner, Mr. Livingstone, Kakababu finds out that he is eager to sell off the property. It leads him to believe that some people are conspiring to acquire the hotel at a much lower price. The new owner tells them about the mysterious disappearance of two German tourists and how it has drastically affected their hotel business. He also tells them how the Masai tribe has been poaching wild animals and selling off their skin to protest against the government policy. A Kenya Government official and businessman, Mr. Ninjane invites Kakababu to visit his hotel in Masai Mara forest. After an adventurous journey, they reach the hotel, Little Viceroy. Kakababu comes across some shady people in the hotel, senses foul play and decides to dig deep. As he starts enquiring, they get sucked into yet another dangerous game of life and death.

== Cast ==
- Prosenjit Chatterjee as Kakababu
- Aryann Bhowmik as Santu
- Anirban Chakrabarti as Amal De
- Soumyabrata Rakshit as Hansmukh Patel
- Jacques Adriaanse as Gunard Olen
- Perebo George as Otambo
- Alonso Grandio as the Spanish man
- Hugh Becker as the German poacher
- Paul Ditchfield as Lafarge
- Tafadzwa Fasenda as Philips
- David Mbenze as Isaac
- Eric Masango as Ninjane

=== Special appearance ===
- Srijit Mukherji as P. R. Lohia

== Soundtrack ==
Kakababur Protyaborton

Soundtrack album by Indraadip Dasgupta
- Released: 23 January 2022
- Recorded: 2021
- Studio: IDP Studios
- Genre: Film soundtrack
- Length: 16:06
- Language: Bengali
- Label: SVF

The background score and the soundtracks are composed by Indraadip Dasgupta and lyrics are penned by Srijato.

Track listing
No.	Title	Lyrics	Music	Singer	Length
1.	"Phire Elo Kakababu"	Srijato	Indraadip Dasgupta	Rupam Islam	6:43
2.	"Teen Tirikke Noy"	Srijato	Indraadip Dasgupta	Anindya Chatterjee; Upal Sengupta; Chandril Bhattacharya	4:45
3.	"Nei Bhoy"	Srijato	Indraadip Dasgupta	Shaan	5:18
Total length:					16:06

== Release ==
The film was released on 4 February 2022 coinciding with the occasion of Saraswati Puja.

== See also ==
- Kakababu in other media
