= Narayana Schools =

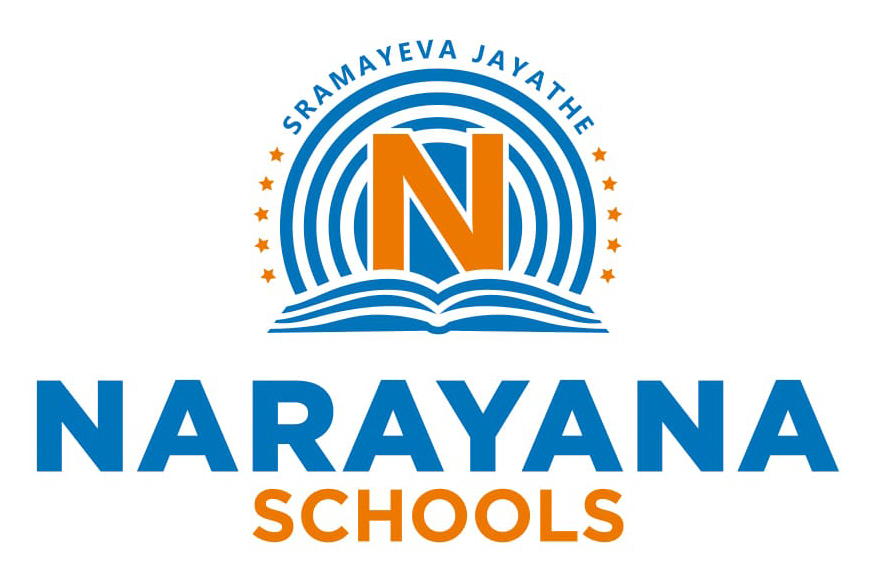
- India

Information
- Type: Private school chain
- Motto: Sramayeva Jayate
- Established: 1985, Nellore
- Founder: P. Narayana
- School board: Andhra Pradesh and Telangana (State Board), CBSE
- President: Puneet Kothapa
- Director: Dr. Sindhura Narayana, Sharani Narayana
- Grades: Nursery – Grade 12
- Age range: 3–17
- Language: English
- Campuses: 500+
- Campus type: Day Boarding Campus
- Colors: Blue and Orange (Brand colour code)
- Affiliation: CBSE, ICSE, State Boards
- Website: narayanaschools.in

Narayana Schools is an Indian network of private and secondary schools operated by the Narayana Group of Educational Institutions. The school chain operates across 23 Indian states and union territories, with schools affiliated with the Central Board of Secondary Education (CBSE), Council for the Indian School Certificate Examinations (CISE), and various state education boards.

== History ==
Narayana Schools is operated by the Narayana Educational Group. Founded in 1979 by P. Narayana in Nellore, Andhra Pradesh, the group initially began as a competitive exam coaching center before expanding into junior colleges and K–12 schooling across multiple states in India.

In March 2025, the institution announced the opening of 52 new campuses across 12 Indian states for the 2025–26 academic year.

== Operations and expansion ==
As of March 2025, Narayana Educational Institutions operated 907 campuses including schools, junior colleges and coaching centres, across 23 Indian states. For the 2025–26 academic year, the institution announced plans to open 52 additional campuses across 12 states, including 21 in Telangana and eight in Andhra Pradesh.

== Governance ==
The Narayana Educational Group has its administrative headquarters in Hyderabad, Telangana. The group was founded by Ponguru Narayana. Puneet Kothapa serves as its president, while Sindhura Narayana and Sharani Narayana serve as directors.

== Student programmes ==
In December 2025, Narayana schools hosted a TED-Ed Student Talks event in which 23 students presented talks on science, environmental issues, social responsibility, mental health, and innovation. The institution also conducts the Master Orator Contest, a public speaking competition held across its campuses.

== Academic performance ==
Students from Narayana Schools have participated in national entrance examinations, including JEE and NEET. In 2025, students won gold medals at the International Olympiad on Astronomy and Astrophysics (IOAA) and the International Chemistry Olympiad (IChO).

== Extracurriculars activities and sports ==
In 2025, students from Narayana Schools won medals at national sporting competitions including a gold medal at the CBSE National Skating Championship and silver medals at the 6th Federation Kudo Cup National Championship.
