= Sabyasachi Chakrabarty =

Indian actor (born 1956)

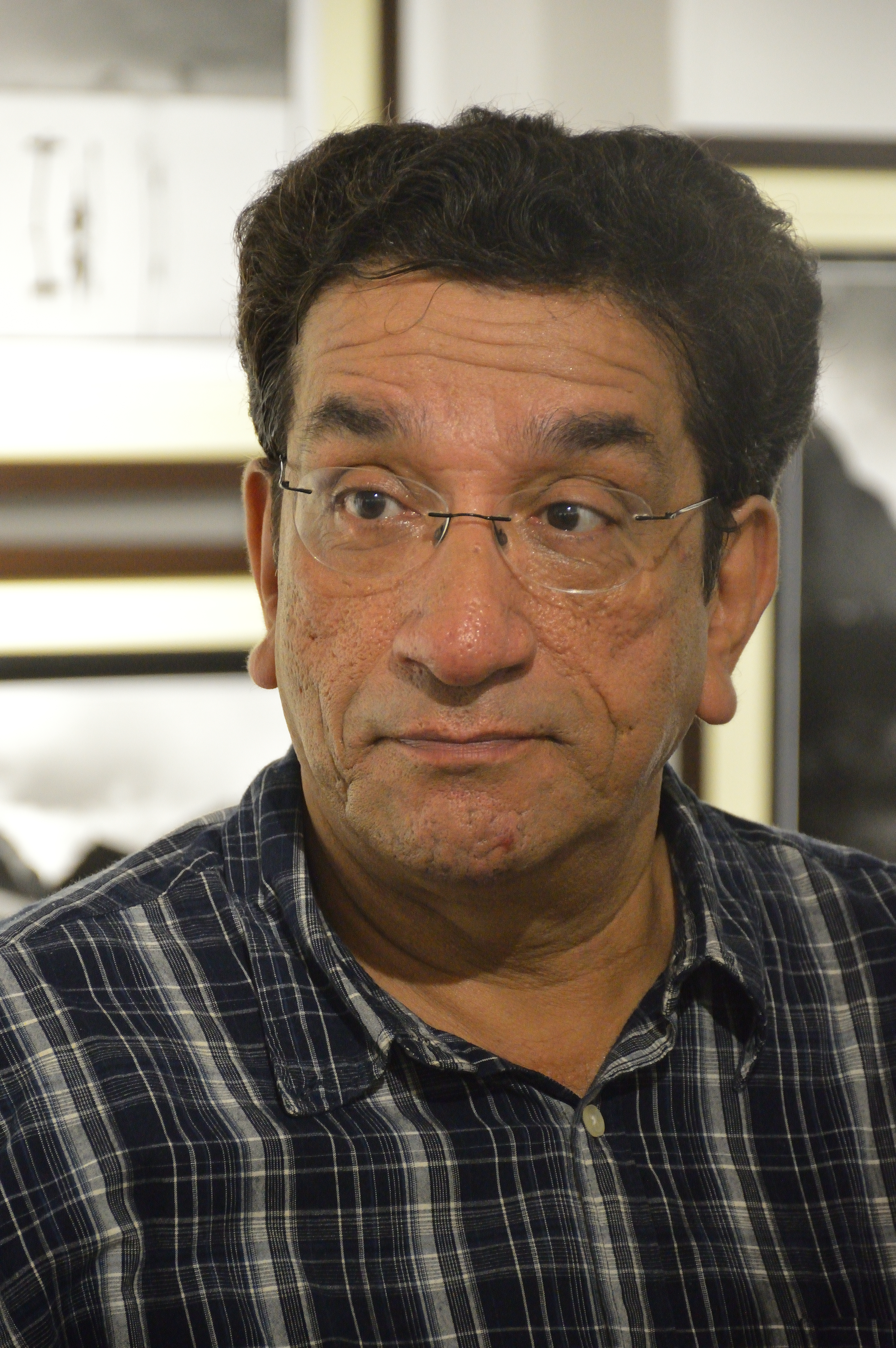
- Chakrabarty in July 2016
- Born: 8 September 1956 (age 70)
- Education: University of Delhi (BSc)
- Occupation: Actor
- Years active: 1970s–present
- Notable work: Feluda film series; Kakababu film series
- Political party: Communist Party of India (Marxist)
- Spouse: Mithu Chakrabarty (m. 1986)
- Children: Gaurav Chakrabarty; Arjun Chakrabarty
- Parent(s): Jagadish Chandra Chakrabarty (father); Monica Chakrabarty (mother)
- Relatives: Bijon Bhattacharya (Maternal uncle), Papiya Sen (sister), Raja Sen, Nabarun Bhattacharya
- Awards: Kalakar Awards; Anandalok Awards

Sabyasachi Chakrabarty (Bengali pronunciation: [/ʃobːæʃaːtʃiː/]) is an Indian actor who predominantly works in the Bengali theatre, Bengali cinema and television series. He is particularly known for portraying two of Bengali literature's most prominent fictional detectives Feluda and Kakababu.

== Early life and education ==
Chakrabarty was born on 8 September 1956 to Jagadish Chandra Chakrabarty and Monica Chakrabarty. He has a sister Papiya Sen, who is also an actress. His parents used to call him "Benu" in his childhood and subsequently he gets referred to as Benu Da by some of his colleagues in the film industry.

In 1975, he completed his schooling from the Andrew's High School in Kolkata. He earned a degree in B.Sc. from the Hansraj College in New Delhi, which is affiliated to the University of Delhi. He cleared his AMI examination from Delhi in 1978. Apart from acting, he is a nature enthusiast and wildlife photographer.

== Career ==
Sabyasachi's first mainstream work was a lead role in the 1986 TV series Tero Parbon for Kolkata Doordarshan channel. Tero Parbon was critically acclaimed with a memorable soundtrack in which his role as the character Gora was well-received and made him fairly popular in his early days of acting.

He made his movie debut in Tapan Sinha’s Antardhan in 1992. He continued to work in several television series and shows (mostly in Bengali). He has directed many TV shows and some shows for children. He played Kakababu in the Kakababu original film series. He acted in Kakababu Here Gelen? (1995) and Ek Tukro Chand (2001) and the mini TV series Khali Jahajer Rahasya (1999) as Kakababu. His has played Feluda in multiple films, television series and telefilms. His roles in Antardhan, Sweth Pathorer Thala, Mahulbanir Sereng, Parineeta (Hindi), Nishijapon and Mira Nair's The Namesake amongst others have earned him wide recognition. He has worked in a number of Hindi movies and TV shows as well.

=== Feluda portrayal ===
Chakrabarty has portrayed Feluda on both small and big screens. He has said in various interviews that Feluda is one of his idols and favourite heroes from his young age. In the late 1980's he met the author of Feluda series Satyajit Ray and expressed an interest in portraying Feluda. But Satyajit Ray said that he will not make another Feluda movie because Santosh Dutta, the actor who played the role of Jatayu, died in 1988. Ray told him to meet his son Sandip Ray, who was a new film director at that time. He met Sandip Ray, but Ray had no plan of making any Feluda film at that time. So, Chakraborty continued working in theatre and television.

In 1994, Sandip Ray called Chakrabarty at his home and offered him the role of Feluda in the new Feluda film series directed by Sandip Ray. The series consisted of ten telefilms and five theatrical films in Bengali based on Feluda's character in the novels. Chakrabarty's first Feluda portrayal was in Baksho Rahashya (1996). It was a telefilm and was a part of the Feluda 30 telefilm series, which included five telefilms based on five different Feluda novels. The series continued from 1996 to 1997. In 1999, four Feluda telefilms were released as a part of the telefilm series Satyajiter Gappo. In 2000, he portrayed Feluda in the telefilm Dr. Munshir Diary. It marked the last Feluda telefilm since 2000.

In 2003, Chakrabarty portrayed Feluda in the Sandip Ray directorial Bombaiyer Bombete. It marked the first theatrical film of the new Feluda film series and the third theatrical adaptation of Feluda since Joi Baba Felunath (1979). The remaining four theatrical films of the new Feluda film series were released subsequently — Kailashey Kelenkari (2007), Tintorettor Jishu (2008), Gorosthaney Sabdhan (2010) and Royal Bengal Rohosso (2011). Tintorettor Jishu was the first Feluda film that was shot abroad. An extension of the series, a sixth theatrical Feluda film — Double Feluda directed by Sandip Ray was released in 2016. It also served as a tribute on 50 years of Feluda.

=== Theatre ===
Chakraborty became associated with theatre in the 1970s and joined the theatre group Charbak in the 1980s. In the 1980s, he appeared in the Charbak productions Poddo Goddo Probondho written and directed by Jochhon Dastidar and Asol Jinis written by Jagadish Chakraborty and directed by Jochhon Dastidar. In the 1990s, he appeared in a number of Charbak productions written by Chandra Dastidar and directed by Jochhon Dastidar — Soti, Pratyasha, Banjara, Mukhomukhi and Aloy Fera.

In 2001, he appeared in Thikana, written and directed by Chandra Dastidar. In 2002, he appeared in Kande Keno Behula Sondori, written and directed by Kheyali Dastidar. In 2005, he played the lead role in Cholo Potol Tuli. It has been adapted into a film of the same name - Cholo Potol Tuli (2020). In 2012, he appeared in Charbak's production Doodh Kheyechhe Meow directed by Arindam Ganguly. In 2015, he appeared in Chitey Gur, written and directed by Arindam Ganguly. In 2025, he directed and played the lead role in the audio drama Asol Jinish. He has also worked in other Charbak productions including Apsara Theare-er Mamla, Ekhon Tokhon, Shironaam and Bheeti O Shubhechchha.

== Filmography ==
Year	Film	Role	Language	Notes	Ref.
1992	Antardhan	Police Inspector Rohit	Bengali	Marked his debut feature film	
1992	Shwet Patharer Thala	Abhijit Bhattacharya	Bengali		
1993	Tomar Rokte Amar Sohag		Bengali		
1994	Cinemay Jamon Hoy!		Bengali		
1994	Rakta Nadir Dhara	Abinash Sarkar	Bengali		
1994	Sandhyatara		Bengali		
1995	Kakababu Here Gelen?	Kakababu	Bengali		
1996	Lathi	Prashanta's father, an IPS officer	Bengali		
1996	Biyer Phool	Ashit Mukherjee	Bengali		
1996	Rabibar		Bengali		
1996	Damu	Potai Chor	Bengali		
1997	Sampradaan		Bengali		
1997	Sanghaat		Bengali		
1997	Karna		Bengali		
1998	Dil Se..	A ULFA terrorist	Hindi	Marked his Hindi-language film debut	
1998	Bhoomi Thayiya Chochchala Maga	Channabasappa	Kannada	Marked his Kannada-language feature film debut	
1999	Debanjali		Bengali		
1999	Rajdando		Bengali		
1999	Didi Amar Ma		Bengali		
2000	Atmiya Swajan		Bengali		
2000	Shesh Thikana	Dr. Devdutta	Bengali		
2001	Cancer		Bengali		
2001	Ek Je Aachhe Kanya	Anjan	Bengali		
2001	Ek Tukro Chand	Kakababu	Bengali		
2002	Ferari Fauj	Nilmoni Mitra / Shanti Ray	Bengali		
2002	Antarghaat	Abinaash	Bengali		
2002	Kone Dekhar Pore		Bengali	Also as director	
2002	Desh	Sanjay Nandi, a journalist	Bengali		
2003	Bombaiyer Bombete	Feluda	Bengali		
2003	Rakhe Hari Mare Ke		Bengali		
2003	Shatabdir Galpo		Bengali		
2004	Eke Eke Tin		Bengali		
2004	Waarish	Subhankar	Bengali		
2004	Mahulbanir Sereng	Somesh Gomes	Bengali		
2004	Khakee	Home Minister Deodhar	Hindi		
2004	Dui Bon	Shashanka	Bengali		
2005	Sangram	Inspector Biswadeb Rai	Bengali		
2005	Ditiyo Basanta		Bengali		
2005	Mantra		Bengali		
2005	Abisswasee				
2005	Parineeta	Navinchandra Rai	Hindi		
2005	Nishijapon	Nirmal Das	Bengali		
2006	Manush Bhut		Bengali		
2006	The Namesake	Ashima's Father	English	Also released in Bengali	
2006	Bibar		Bengali		
2006	Herbert	Police Officer	Bengali		
2006	Pisir Recipe		Bengali		
2007	Kailashey Kelenkari	Feluda	Bengali		
2007	Ballygunge Court	Udoyon	Bengali		
2007	Bow Barracks Forever	Tom	English	Also released in Hindi and Bengali	
2007	Bidhatar Lekha		Bengali		
2008	Tintorettor Jishu	Feluda	Bengali		
2008	Bhalobasa Bhalobasa	Aravind (Siddhu's father)	Bengali		
2008	Raktamukhi Neela	Inspector Chakraborti	Bengali		
2008	Lal-Kalo	Spider	Bengali	First Bengali animation film; Hindi version released under the title Cheenti Cheenti Bang Bang	
2009	Maati -O- Manush	Atal Master	Bengali		
2009	Chha-e Chuti	Himself	Bengali		
2009	Aalive	Rik Roy	Bengali		
2009	Angshumaner Chhobi	Bikashranjan	Bengali		
2009	Piyalir Password	Somor Sen	Bengali		
2009	Lakshyabhed	Monohar Maharaj, owner of Ananda Ashram	Bengali		
2009	Friend	Ranju Da	Bengali		
2009	033	Santiago	Bengali		
2009	Anubhab		Bengali		
2009	Mullik Bari		Bengali		
2009	Pakhi		Bengali		
2010	Gorosthaney Sabdhan	Feluda	Bengali		
2010	Ek Jhank Ichhe Dana		Bengali		
2010	Agni Yuddha		Bengali		
2010	Laboratory	Nandakishore, a scientist	Bengali		
2010	Shukno Lanka	Joy Sundar Sen	Bengali		
2010	Thana Theke Aschhi	Tinkori Halder	Bengali		
2010	Bolo Na Tumi Aamar	DIG Indrajit Chatterjee	Bengali		
2010	Lahore	Sikandar Hyaat Khan	Hindi		
2011	Royal Bengal Rahashya	Feluda	Bengali		
2011	Romeo	Aviraj Roy	Bengali		
2011	Ei Mon Tomai Diyechi		Bengali	Also released in Odia-language	
2011	Ajob Prem Ebong Ekti Buser Golpo	Janardan Dutta	Bengali		
2011	System	Dilawar Sheikh	Bengali		
2012	From Sydney with Love	Prof. Banerjee	Hindi		
2012	Accident	Amit Durjari	Bengali		
2012	Tor Naam	Raju's father	Bengali		
2012	Kanchenjunga Express		Bengali		
2012	Hemlock Society	Dhomoni Ghosh	Bengali	Guest appearance	
2012	Bikram Singha: The Lion Is Back	Senior Inspector	Bengali	Special appearance	
2012	Bhooter Bhabishyat	The storyteller who is Biplab Dasgupta's ghost	Bengali		
2013	Aagunpakhi		Bengali		
2013	C/O Sir	The headmaster in Jayabrata's school	Bengali		
2013	Arjun: Kalimpong E Sitaharan	Amal Shome	Bengali		
2013	Run	A Pakistani Army Major	Bengali		
2013	Holud Pakhir Dana	Dr. Anirban	Bengali		
2013	Bawali Unlimited	The funny film director	Bengali		
2013	Chhayamoy	Chandra Kumar / Chhayamoy	Bengali		
2014	Teenkahon	Gyanesh Mitra	Bengali		
2014	Bachchan	Sanjay	Bengali	Cameo appearance	
2015	Phantom	Roy, RAW chief	Hindi		
2015	Mayer Biye	Dr. Anish Roy	Bengali		
2016	Double Feluda	Feluda	Bengali	His last appearance as Feluda	
2016	Abhimaan	Ashok Deb Burman, a rich businessman	Bengali		
2016	Shikari	Rudro Chowdhury	Bengali	Indo-Bangladesh joint production	
2016	Power	Police Commissioner Ranjit Kumar Kapuria	Bengali		
2016	Te3n	Manohar Sinha	Hindi		
2017	Jawker Dhan	Karali Mukhopadhyay	Bengali		
2017	Meghnad Badh Rahasya	Prof. Asimove Bose	Bengali		
2017	Bhoot Adbhoot	Ghost Buster	Bengali		
2017	Aagun	Masterda Surjyo Sekhor Sen	Bengali		
2017	Nabab	Chief journalist of a news agency	Bengali	Indo-Bangladesh joint production	
2017	Porobashinee		Bengali		
2018	Micheal		Bengali		
2019	Network	Arindam Chakraborty	Bengali		
2019	Boba Rohosyo	Inspector Gorai	Bengali		
2019	Patra Chai		Bengali		
2019	Adda	White, the angel of light	Bengali		
2019	Kolkatay Kohinoor		Bengali		
2019	Bong-O-Rohosyo		Bengali		
2019	Bhobishyoter Bhoot	Bhuter raja	Bengali		
2020	Cholo Potol Tuli	Ashwini	Bengali		
2020	SOS Kolkata	Raghav Sen, Senior Security Advisor and ISI agent	Bengali		
2020	Gondi	Asgar	Bengali	First Bangladeshi film	
2021	Avijatrik	Shankar	Bengali		
2021	Nirbhaya	Justice	Bengali		
2021	Baazi	Krishna Kumar Bardhan	Bengali		
2022	Babli Bouncer	Saurav Dutta (Uncle Ji)	Hindi		
2022	Code Name: Tiranga	Ranjit Kapoor	Hindi		
2023	Tenida and Co.	Satkari Santra / Nakari Santra	Bengali		
2023	JK 1971	The Pilot in command	Bengali		
2025	Devi Chowdhurani	Haraballabh Ray	Bengali		

== Television ==
=== Telefilms ===
Year	Telefilm	Role	Network	Language	Notes	Ref.
1990	Siddhartha Chatterjeer Antardhan	Detective Somak Sen		Bengali		
1996	Kuasha Jakhan	Micheal	DD Bangla	Bengali		
1996–1997	Baksho Rahashya	Feluda	DD Bangla	Bengali	Five films released under the package Feluda 30	
1996–1997	Gosaipur Sargaram	Feluda	DD Bangla	Bengali	Five films released under the package Feluda 30	
1996–1997	Sheyal Debota Rahasya	Feluda	DD Bangla	Bengali	Five films released under the package Feluda 30	
1996–1997	Bosepukure Khunkharapi	Feluda	DD Bangla	Bengali	Five films released under the package Feluda 30	
1996–1997	Joto Kando Kathmandute	Feluda	DD Bangla	Bengali	Five films released under the package Feluda 30	
1998–1999	Jahangirer Swarnamudra	Feluda	DD Bangla	Bengali	Four films released under the package Satyajiter Goppo	
1998–1999	Ghurghutiyar Ghotona	Feluda	DD Bangla	Bengali	Four films released under the package Satyajiter Goppo	
1998–1999	Golapi Mukto Rahashya	Feluda	DD Bangla	Bengali	Four films released under the package Satyajiter Goppo	
1998–1999	Ambar Sen Antardhan Rahashya	Feluda	DD Bangla	Bengali	Four films released under the package Satyajiter Goppo	
2000	Dr. Munshir Diary	Feluda	ETV Bangla	Bengali	Single film released under the package Satyajiter Priyo Golpo	
2001	Chordline			Bengali		
2001	Sedin Bristhi Nemechilo			Bengali		
2001	Count Down			Bengali		
2002	Bela Sheshe			Bengali		
2002	Chena Britter Baire			Bengali	Directed the film, besides acting in it	
2002	Galper Nayika			Bengali	Credited as the director	
2003	John Jenny Jonardon	Jonardon		Bengali		
2004	Vanish			Bengali		
2005	Ni:shobde			Bengali		
2005	Joy Baba Rudranath	Rudra Sen	ETV Bangla	Bengali		
2005	Manthan			Bengali		
2005	Roopkathar Jibon		Tara Muzik	Bengali		
2006	Scandal			Bengali		
2009	Swarnali Jaal		Tara Muzik	Bengali	Directed the film, besides acting in it	
2019	Jamai Elo Ghore		Zee Bangla Cinema	Bengali	Zee Bangla Cinema Originals	

=== Television series ===
Year	Television series	Role	Network	Language	Notes	Ref.
1985	Sahityer Sera Golpo		DD Bangla	Bengali		
1986	Tero Parbon	Gaurav Bose a.k.a. Gora	DD Bangla	Bengali	13 part anthology television series; Based on an eponymous novel by Samaresh Majumdar	
1988	Uran Chandi		DD Bangla	Bengali	8 episodes television series	
1989	Olpo Solpo Golpo		DD Bangla	Bengali	Credited for the cinematography	
1989–1990	Sey Shomoy	Parbati Charan	DD Bangla	Bengali		
1990	Gourav	Gourav Bose a.k.a. Gora	DD National	Hindi	13 episode television series; Hindi remake of Tero Parbon	
1990	Ascharya Deepak	Deepak Das, a modern day genie	DD National	Hindi	13 episode television series; Inspired from the One Thousand and One Nights	
1990	Akashpuri		DD Bangla	Bengali		
1990	Olpo Hasi Olpo Kanna			Bengali		
1995	Golpo Gathar Deshe			Bengali	Credited as the director	
1999	Khali Jahajer Rahasya	Kakababu	DD Bangla	Bengali	13 episode Television series	
1999	Tarkash		Zee TV	Hindi	Soap opera	
2000	Cell 3		Zee TV	Hindi	Soap opera	
2001–2005	Rudra Sener Diary	Rudra Sen	DD Bangla; ETV Bangla	Bengali	39 part television series — First 13 parts streamed on DD Bangla and next 26 parts streamed on ETV Bangla	
2001–2003	Ekaki Aronye		ETV Bangla	Bengali	Adaptated from some stories of Prafulla Roy	
2001–2004	Rahasya Golpo			Bengali	Credited as the director	
2005–2006	Ke?			Bengali	Investigative reality show; anchor and creative director	
2007–2008	Tenida	Tenida (voice)	Zee Bangla	Bengali	Animated television series	
2007	Chorabali			Bengali		
2010–2011	Gaaner Oparey	Sribilash Deb	Star Jalsha	Bengali	Soap opera	
2014–2016	Dwiragaman	Jayanta Basu	Zee Bangla	Bengali	Soap opera	
2016	Mahanayak	Satrajit Ray	Star Jalsha	Bengali	Soap opera	
2020	Dadagiri Unlimited Season 8	Contestant	Zee Bangla	Bengali	Reality show	
2018–2022	Mahabharat	Bhishma (voice)	Sony Aath	Bengali		

== Web series ==
Year	Web series	Role	OTT platform	Language	Notes	Ref.
2018	In Their Life		Addatimes	Bengali		
2020	Lalbazaar	DC B.D. Sharma	ZEE5	Bengali		
2020	Black Widows	Barry Singh Dhillon	ZEE5	Hindi	Marked his Hindi-language streaming productions debut	
2021	Sleeper Cell		Mojoplex	Bengali		
2022	Search	MP Ashok Barman	Klikk	Bengali		
2026	Advocate Achinta Aich 3	Advocate Digvijay Singha	Hoichoi	Bengali	Season 3 of Advocate Achinta Aich	

== Literary works ==
Chakraborty has written several books in Bengali, including works of memoir, travel writing and personal recollection. His published works include Feludar Sange Panch Dashak, Africay Sabyasachi, Camerar Samne Camerar Pichone and Dana.

Feludar Sange Panch Dashak was published by Bichitrapatra Granthan Bibhag and recounts Chakraborty's association with the character Feluda and his experiences portraying the character. Jangal O Banyaprāner Katha, published by Palak Publishers on 29 January 2026, focuses on forests and wildlife.

Africay Sabyasachi is a travel book based on Chakraborty's experiences in Africa, while Camerar Samne Camerar Pichone contains recollections of his acting career, family and travels. Chakraborty co-edited Baghe Banduke with Sandip Ray. Chakraborty also served as an adviser alongside Sandip Ray, for the first volume of Boner Khabar, an annual collection focused on forests, wildlife and adventure.

== Personal life ==
Sabyasachi married Bengali actress and theatre artist Mithu Chakrabarty in 1986. They have two sons, Gaurav Chakrabarty and Arjun Chakrabarty, both of whom are actors in the Bengali film and television industries.

== Accolades ==
Title	Year	Category	Work	Result	Ref.
Anandalok Awards	2002	Best actor	Ek Je Aachhe Kanya	Won	
Anandalok Awards	2004	Best actor	Bombaiyer Bombete	Won	
BFJA Award	1995	Best supporting actor	Sandhyatara	Won	
BFJA Award	1996	Best actor	Kakababu Here Gelen	Won	
BFJA Award	2000	Best supporting actor			
BFJA Award	2005	Best actor	Mahulbanir Sereng	Won	
Kalakar Awards					

== See also ==
- Feluda in film
- Kakababu in other media
