= Messi (2017 film) =

- Directed by: Riingo Banerjee
- Produced by: Pradip Churiwal
- Starring: Aryann Bhowmick; Ronodeep Bose; Chaiti Ghosal; Rana Mitra; Aishika
- Production company: Macneill Engineering
- Release date: 26 May 2017
- Country: India
- Language: Bengali

Messi is a 2017 Bengali football film directed by Riingo Banerjee and produced by Pradip Churiwal. The title is a reference to Argentine footballer Lionel Messi.

== Plot ==
Messi is a story about two brothers. The elder brother Prosun doesn't do anything except loitering around with his girlfriend and fixing local football matches for his brother from whom he gets a share of winning money. The younger brother Chotu, who wears the jersey titled "Messi", is highly gifted in football (soccer). He is the pride of his family and the hope of their father who once used to be a football coach. While attending one such match which Prosun arranges for Chotu, an accident happens and Chotu is left physically disadvantaged for life. The unfortunate incident fills Prosun with unfathomed guilt, and to get rid of this guilt he attempts to achieve the impossible. He attempts to step into his brother's shoes.

== Cast ==
- Aryann Bhowmik as Chotu
- Shankar Chakraborty
- Chaiti Ghoshal as Malati
- Nigel Anthony
- Ronodeep Bose as Prasun
- Arindam Bose
- Rana Mitra
- Ashika
- Sumit Samadder
- GM Tonoy
