= Rupam Islam =

Indian singer and composer (born 1974)

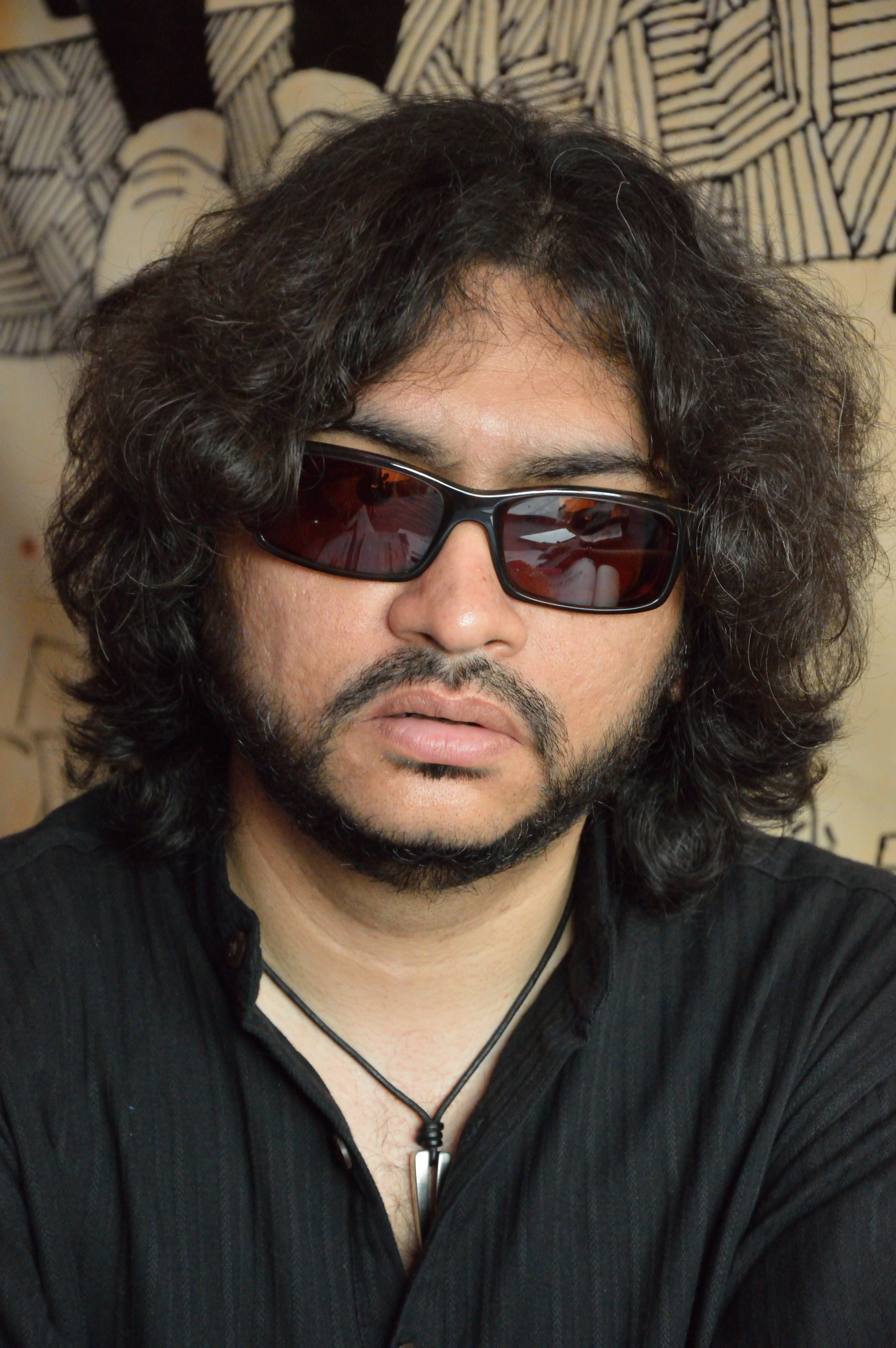
- Islam in 2014

Background information
- Born: 25 January 1974 (age 52); Kolkata, West Bengal, India
- Genre: Bangla rock
- Occupations: Singer; songwriter; music composer; writer
- Instruments: Guitar; keyboards; Harmonica
- Years active: 1998–present
- Labels: Saregama; Asha Audio; Times Music; Bangla Rock; Bengali Rock Band
- Member of: Fossils
- Education: Asutosh College; University of Calcutta
- Spouse: Rupsa Dasgupta (m. 2007)
- Children: 1

Rupam Islam (Note: Bengali: [ˈrupom ˈislam].) (Bengali: [ˈrupom ˈislam]; born 25 January 1974) is an Indian singer-songwriter, music composer and writer. He is the lead vocalist of the Bengali rock band Fossils. Outside of his rock music work, Islam also contributes to several Bengali film productions as a playback singer.

In 2010, he won the National Film Award for Best Male Playback Singer for his performance in the Bengali film, Mahanagar@Kolkata. He is also a member of the Bangla Sangeet Akademi, an institution under the Government of West Bengal.

== Early life ==
Rupam Islam was born into a musical family in Kolkata. His parents, Nurul and Chandita, were both musicians. He began performing music in his youth, appearing on All India Radio and Doordarshan programs by age nine.

He completed a bachelor's degree in education and taught English at Taki House in Rajabazar, Kolkata, for several years before focusing on music.

== Musical career ==
Rupam Islam started his professional career in the late 1990s with the Bengali rock band Fossils. Islam has released several albums and worked as a playback singer and solo artist, receiving awards for his work in Bengali films.

In 2010, Islam won the National Film Award for Best Male Playback Singer for his performance in Mahanagar@Kolkata. He has also composed jingles for commercials and Television shows.

== Activism ==
Rupam Islam publicly expressed concern over women's safety in India, particularly following the 2024 R.G. Kar Medical College rape and murder case. He joined other musicians in West Bengal to participate in protests addressing issues faced by women in the region.

He later released the song "Khoto" (transl. 'Wound'), which reflects on societal issues related to the incident. The song has been described as a response to the crime and the perceived governmental inaction.

== Personal life ==
Rupam Islam married Rupsha Dasgupta in 2007, and they have a son named Rup Aarohan Prometheus, who was born in 2010.

== Discography ==
=== Solo albums ===
Year	Albums	Songs	Audio Label
1998	Tor Bhorshatey	Cholo Aj; Dukkha Korben Na; Halud Jama; Komlo Megheder Ojon; Neel Rong Chilo Bhison Priyo; Swapno Bhangar; Tobu Dur Akasher; Tomar Chokher Kalo Chai	His Master's Voice
2003	Neel Rong Chilo Bhishon Priyo (re-release of Tor Bhorshatey)	Cholo Aj; Dukkha Korben Na; Halud Jama; Komlo Megheder Ojon; Neel Rong Chilo Bhison Priyo; Swapno Bhangar; Tobu Dur Akasher; Tomar Chokher Kalo Chai	Saregama
2010	Na-Hanyate	Bedwetter - Bari Theke Palabo; Bhyapsha Blues - Mishti Duswapno Hotasha; Joan Of Arc - Kothaay Niye Jaabe Aamay Bolo; Kishori - Kishori Tor Chokher Jol E; Kokhono E Pothey - Kokhono E Pothey Hente Jeo; Laal Golaap - Mone Porey Kichu Ghotona; Na Hanyate - Kije Bhalo Lage; Rockbaaj - Holdete Smriti Bhora	Saregama
2011	Nishkromon	Free Zone; Chador; Taake Chini; Ghor Shajaai; Kisher Aaral; Aalo; The Wo Wo Song; Atmobisleshon	Saregama
2015	Prerona	Prerona; In Love And War	Times Music
2017	Notun Niyom	Chandnite Unmaad Ekjon; Chithhi; Daniken; Haowaay Paa; Kobe; Obhijaan; Songhoti Janai; Ugrobader Guptoboi	Bangla Rock
2020	Aami	Flyover; Radio Jokey; Hotat Bristi; Aadomer Sontaan; Jhor; Chaowar Durotwo; Boichor; Aami Jaai	Bangla Rock
2021	Aami vs Tumi	Koto Kichhu Ghotey; Tumi Aamar Bondhu Holey; Karon Aamra Aakashe; Pashe Je Bose Ache	SVF Music

=== Singles ===
Year	Songs	Audio Label
2018	Aami Tomaay Bhalobashi Vol.1	Bangla Rock
2018	Aami Tomaay Bhalobashi Vol.2	Bangla Rock
2018	Runanubandha	Bangla Rock
2019	Stor	Zee Music Company
2020	Dogdoge Itihasher Ghaa	Bangla Rock
2020	Bibhajon	Bangla Rock
2020	Iswar	Bangla Rock
2021	Phishphash Juge	Bangla Rock
2021	Na Bola Golpera	Bangla Rock
2021	Mukhosh	Bangla Rock
2024	Khoto | Justice For R.G. Kar. | Protest Song	Bangla Rock

=== Collaborations ===
Year	Albums/Singles	Songs	Co-artist(s)	Audio Label
2007	Rupam n Bumpy	Aeroplane Asukhi Jhor Bhul Dyakho In The Rain Jadi Tomay Boli Jane Mon Monday blues	Bumpy	UD Series
2013	Last Counter	Ambition Sukumar Professor Dutta Tumi Jodi Chand Bhoot Eseche Shomoy Dikshunpur	Somlata Acharyya Chowdhury Anindya Chatterjee Sahana Bajpaie Rajkumar Sengupta Arnab Chowdhury	INRECO
2017	Bhule Jai Purono Se Din	Bhule Jai Purono Se Din	Debaditya Chaudhury	Bangla Rock
2018	Gaaner Jonmo	Gaaner Jonmo	Tanmoy Bose	Bangla Rock
2018	Adventure	Adventure	Koushik Chakraborty Sayan Mitra Timir Biswas Tamal Kanti Haldar Ananya Bhattacharjee Tushar Debnath Kabir Chattopadhyay Nilanjan Mandal Suyasha Sengupta	Bangla Rock
2019	Ekdol Bondhu	Ekdol Bondhu	Srijita Mitra Sulagna Banerjee Argha Sen Soumyadip Chakraborty	Bangla Rock
2020	Mi Amaar Pujo	Mi Amaar Pujo	Srjita Mitra Shibasish Banerjee	Bangla Rock
2021	Ekla Pothe	Ekla Pothe	Paroma Banerji Allan Temjen Ao	Bangla Rock
2021	Bishaal Brishtira	Bishaal Brishtira	Samik Roy Choudhury Srijita Mitra	Bangla Rock
2022	Drugs Birodhi Gaan	Drugs Birodhi Gaan	Surojit Chatterjee	Bangla Rock
2023	Elaka Kanpbe - BAND E MIC Concert Title Song	Elaka Kanpbe	Anupam Roy Timir Biswas Siddhartha Ray Anindya Chatterjee Upal Sengupta Gaurab 'GABOO' Chatterjee Rajiv Mitra Abhijit 'POTA' Barman	Bangla Rock
2024	Purono Guitar	Purono Guitar	Biswa Roy Raja Chanda	Bangla Rock
2024	Abar Aronye	Abar Aronye	Soumya Rit	Pluto Music
2024	ISL - Indian Super League Theme Song	Gorber Notun Porbo	Subhajit 'KC' Mukherjee	
2024	Nouka Bilashi	Nouka Bilashi	Shiladitya-Som Amyt Dutta	Asha Audio
2024	Durga Tumi Themo Na- a song to celebrate the power within	Durga Tumi Themo Na	Lopamudra Mitra Upal Sengupta Timir Biswas Somlata Acharyya Chowdhury Ujjaini Mukherjee Srijato Bandyopadhyay	Boroliana_by Boroline

=== Fossils ===
Year	Albums	Songs	Audio Label
2002	Fossils	Aro Ekbar Ekla Ghor Nemesis Hasnuhana Dekho Manashi Bisakto Manus Niskramon Millennium	Asha Audio
2004	Fossils 2	Keno Korle Erokom Manab Boma Chhal Harano Podok Tritya Biswa Acid 29 Se October Bicycle Chor Swasti	Asha Audio
2006	Mission F	Etawasta Satotar Bilasita Manob Boma (Unplugged) Friendship Chai Bandhu He Kichhuta Samoy Bisakto Manus (Unplugged) Eka Naow Shono Amra Ki Sobai Hari Na	Asha Audio
2007	Aupodartho	Aupodartho Jonmo Amar(Video Album)	Asha Audio
2009	Fossils 3	Sababhik Khoon Maa Danober Utthan Guru Phire Cholo Bidroher Pandulipi Mummy Bhoot Aar Tilottama, Pt.1 Dhongsho Romonthon Haspatale Mrityu R Pore Rail line e Mrittu Schizophrenic Bra Bhoot Aar Tilottama, Pt.2	Asha Audio
2014	Fossils 4	Khnoro Aamar Fossil Bnaador Haajar Bichhana Mohakaash Baari Esho Shoytaan Resolutions Sthaabor Austhaabor Mrityu	Bangla Rock
2017	Fossils 5	Palao Stobdho Jibon Janla Mrito Manush	Bangla Rock
2019	Fossils 6	Ghreena Hridoy Bhangbar Gaan Dewali Pee	Bangla Rock
2026	Fossils 7	Khudhartho Mangsashi Long Drive-e Wrong Drive-e Auporibortito Jodi Tumi Obhinoy Shunechhi	

=== Writings ===
Year	Writings	Publisher
2006	Epitaph	Ahir Publications
2009	Rupam on the Rocks	Ananda Publishers
2012	Ei Toh Aami	Ananda Publishers
2014	Rockstar	Ananda Publishers
2017	Biswarupam	Ananda Publishers
2022	Anamika Bole Dakte Pari Ki Tomay?	Deep Prakashan
2022	Gaan Samagra 1	Ananda Publishers
2022	Bramha Thakur Plus 2	Deep Prakashan
2024	Teere Eso Sahosinee	Ananda Publishers

== Filmography ==
Denotes films that have not yet been released

Year	Films	Songs	Composer(s)	Writer(s)	Co-singer(s)	Language
2008	Jannat	Jannat Jahan	Pritam	Neelesh Misra		Hindi
2008	Chalo Let's Go	Cross The Line	Neel Dutt	Anjan Dutt		Bengali
2009	Madly Bangalee	I Can Do, Samoy	Neel Dutt	Anjan Dutt		Bengali
2009	Dwando	Bare Bare	Mayookh Bhowmick	Mainak Sinha		Bengali
2009	Risk	Chalo India	Bickram Ghosh	Bickram Ghosh		Bengali
2009	All the Best: Fun Begins	Dil Kare	Pritam	Kumaar	Suraj Jagan	Hindi
2010	Shukno Lanka	Sing Nei Tobu Naam (Remix)	Debojyoti Mishra (Remix) Hemanta Mukherjee (Original)	Gauriprasanna Mazumder		Bengali
2010	033	Rhododendron	Subrata Ghosh & Joyjit Lahiri (Original) Chandrabindoo (Remake)	Subrata Ghosh Joyjit Lahiri		Bengali
2010	Antim Swash Sundar	Tumi Diyecho Ja Ekti Jibon Ami Pelam Toke	Purbayan Chatterjee			Bengali
2010	Tara	Du Mutho Bhat	Tapan Sinha	Bratya Basu		Bengali
2010	Autograph	Beche Thakar Gaan	Anupam Roy Debojyoti Mishra	Anupam Roy		Bengali
2010	Mahanagar@Kolkata	Rakter Gaan O Patangoder Swapno, Badrakto, Ei To Aami	Rupam Islam	Rupam Islam		Bengali
2010	Natobar Notout	Bhitore Bayere Urran	Debojyoti Mishra	Debojyoti Mishra		Bengali
2011	Chaplin	Ke Ke Ke Jane	Indraadip Dasgupta	Ashok Sharma		Bengali
2011	Jiyo Kaka	Aamader Kolkatay	Neel Dutt	Srijato		Bengali
2011	Icche	Halucination	Surojit Chatterjee			Bengali
2011	Baishe Srabon	Ei Srabon	Anupam Roy	Anupam Roy		Bengali
2012	Om Shanti	Dhulo Dhulo Hoye Jachhe Amar Chena Prithibi	Rupam Islam	Rupam Islam		Bengali
2012	Bedroom	Who Am I, Amen, Bedroom a (Title Track)	Rupam Islam Allan Temjen Ao	Rupam Islam		Bengali
2012	Hemlock Society	Phiriye Dewar Gaan	Anupam Roy	Anupam Roy		Bengali
2012	Muktodhara	Dour Dour	Surojit Chatterjee		Surojit Chatterjee	Bengali
2013	Sweetheart	Tor Godhuli Uthone	Yash-Amit	Somnath Kar		Bengali
2013	Annya Na	Chutche Eka-E-Mon	Samik Sinha	Gautam Sushmit		Bengali
2013	Mishawr Rawhoshyo	Kakababur Gaan	Indraadip Dasgupta	Srijato		Bengali
2014	Pilla Nuvvu Leni Jeevitham	Neeli Neeli Kalladana	Anup Rubens	Shree Mani		Telugu
2014	Aamar Ami	Chena Chena Mukh	Kabir & Shiba	Orko Sinha		Bengali
2014	Kanchenjunga Express	Ke Tumi Nandini	Savvy	Savvy		Bengali
2014	Force	Force Title Track	Saptarshi Mukherjee	Saptarshi Mukherjee		Bengali
2015	Jhumura	Chandra Soho Bangshidhoro 1	Prossonyo Ray	Prossonyo Ray		Bengali
2015	She	Chootche Runner	Tapan	Tapan	Rith	Bengali
2015	Otai Last Mms	Ripu	Partho	Partho		Bengali
2015	Target Kolkata	Rojnamcha	Nayan Bhattacharjee			Bengali
2015	Rajkahini	Bharoto Bhagyo Bidhata	Rabindranath Tagore Indraadip Dasgupta (Arrangement)	Rabindranath Tagore	Kabir Suman Kaushiki Chakraborty Rupankar Bagchi Lopamudra Mitra Babul Supriyo Srabani Sen Sidhu Srikanta Acharya Anupam Roy Anweshaa Indraadip Dasgupta	Bengali
2015	Ek Phaali Rod	Pichgola Rastay Hajar Square Feet Swapner Bari	Joy Sarkar	Suchandra Cowdhury		Bengali
2015	Naxal	Sahoj Manush Ei Ekta Din Biplob Ekhon Samay	Rupam Islam Allan Temjen Ao	Rupam Islam	Shyam Khapa (Sahoj Manush) Anirban Ghoshal (Biplob) Avinab Mukherjee (Biplob) Sudipto Das (Biplob)	Bengali
2016	Tadanto	Amar Purono Shorir	Jhuppa	Kaushik Banerjee		Bengali
2016	Shororipu	He is the boss	Dev Sen	Srijato		Bengali
2017	Jawker Dhan	Chhaya Juddho	Meemo	Prantik Chakraborty	Sanchari Chaudhuri	
2017	Yeti Obhijaan	Kakababur Obhijaan	Indraadip Dasgupta	Prasen	Arijit Singh Anupam Roy	Bengali
2018	Aleya	Bandhu Esho	Rohan Ganguly	Samim		Bengali
2018	Ka Kha Ga Gha	Ka Kha Ga Gha Mission	Anindya Chatterjee	Anindya Chatterjee		Bengali
2018	Alinagarer Golokdhadha	Itihaash Kobita	Meemo	Prantik Chakraborty		Bengali
2018	Reunion	Manush Ekhono Manusher Pashe	Joy Sarkar	Rajib Chakraborty	Rupankar Bagchi	Bengali
2018	Happy Pill	Dhulo Jhere Tai	Savvy	Deepangshu		Bengali
2018	Girlfriend	Girlfriend Title Track	Jeet Gannguli	Raja Chanda		Bengali
2018	Bagh Bandi Khela	Bagh Bandi Khela - Title Track	Jeet Gannguli	Ritam Sen		Bengali
2018	Oskar	Mon Jure Thakis Oskar	Loy-Deep	Loy-Deep		Bengali
2019	Wrong Number	Du'Chokhe Tor	Rahul Majumdar	Sourav Malakar		Bengali
2020	Dwitiyo Purush	Aami Achhi	Anupam Roy	Anupam Roy		Bengali
2021	Adieu GODARD	Luhawre Budibaku	Kisaloy Roy	Amartya Bhattacharyya		Odiya
2021	Shororipu 2	Ebhabei Tumi Boro Hoyo Neel Nari	Rupam Islam	Rupam Islam	Aditi Paul Srijita Mitra	Bengali
2022	8/12 Binay Badal Dinesh	Binay Badal Dinesh	Soumya Rit	Soumya Rit		Bengali
2022	Kakababur Protyaborton	Phire Elo Kakababu	Indradip Dasgupta	Srijato		Bengali
2023	Shesh Pata	Sesh Bole Kichu Ache Ki (Full Version) Sesh Bole Kichu Hoy Na	Debojyoti Mishra	Rupam Islam		Bengali
2023	LSD: Laal Suitcase Ta Dekhechen?	LSD - Title Track	Savvy	Srijato		Bengali
2023	Bagha Jatin	Ei Desh Amar Ek Ho Pukar	Nilayan Chatterjee	Nilayan Chatterjee		Bengali
2023	Dawshom Awbotaar	Agunkheko	Anupam Roy	Anupam Roy		Bengali
2023	Manush	Manush Title Track	Ahmmed Humayan	Sanjoy Somaddar		Bengali
2024	Dabaru	Dabaru Title Track	Bonnie Chakraborty	Mangaldeep Chand		Bengali
2024	Ajogyo	Ajogyo Ami (Rock Version)	Anupam Roy	Anupam Roy		Bengali
2024	Babli	Bhalobeshe Phelechi Tomaye	Indraadip Dasgupta	Indraadip Dasgupta Saikat Kundu		Bengali

== Web series/Serial ==
Year	Web Series/Serial	Songs	Composer(s)	Writer(s)	Co-artist(s)	Language	Audio Label
2011	Josh	Shaone Ba Bhadore	Indradeep Dasgupta	Prosen		Bengali	
2020	Judgement Day	Judgement Day Title Track	Rupam Islam	Archan Chakraborty		Hindi	Zee Music Company
2020	Feluda Pherot	Feluda Pherot Title Track	Joy Sarkar	Srijato	Rupankar Bagchi Anupam Roy	Bengali	JMR Music Studio
2023	Nikhoj	Nikhoj Tui Aashbey Bole	Rupam Islam	Rupam Islam		Bengali	SVF Music
