= Srijato =

Indian poet and lyricist

Srijato Bandyopadhyay
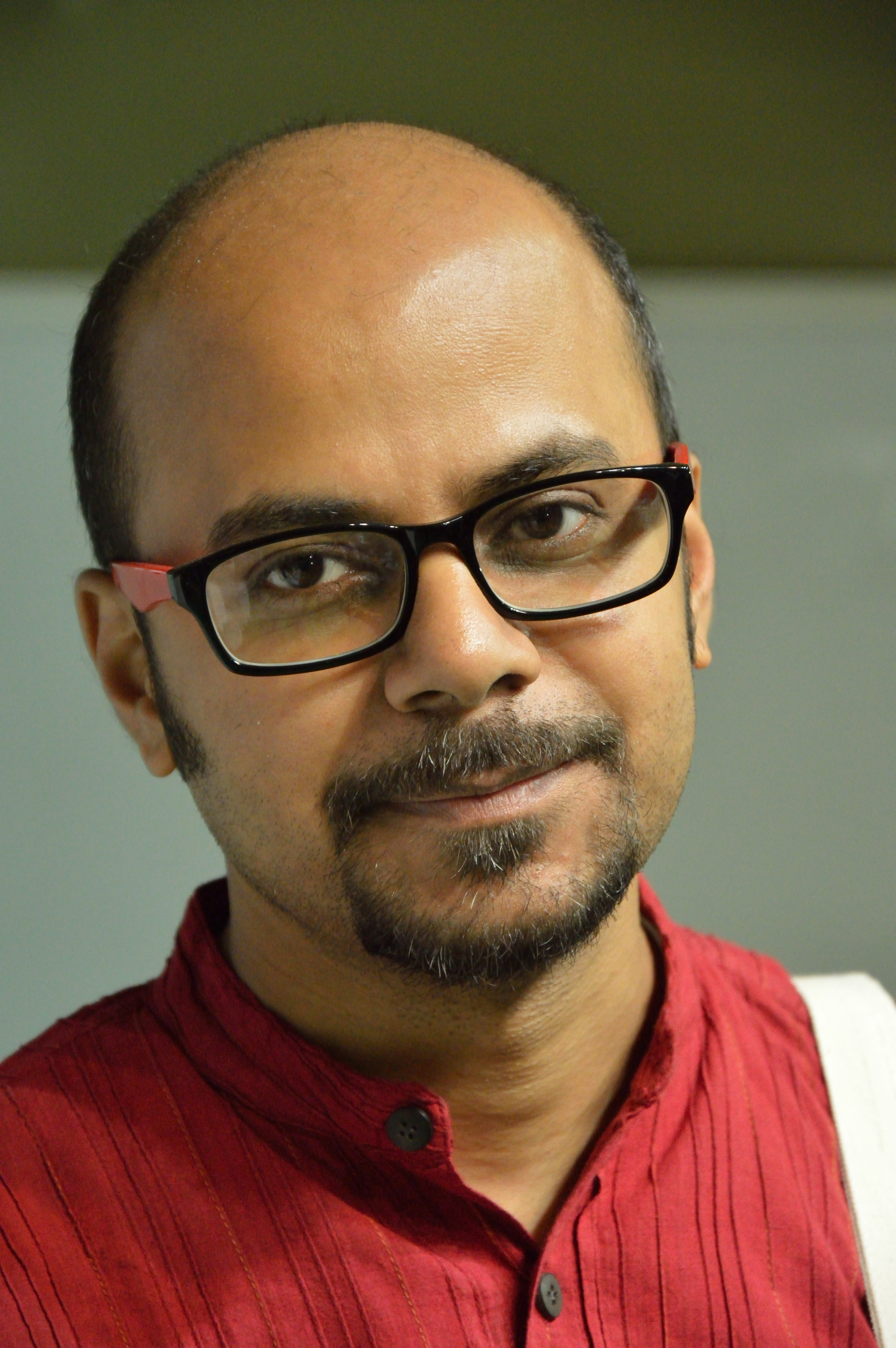
- Srijato at the 38th International Kolkata Book Fair, 2014
- Born: Kolkata, West Bengal India
- Education: Asutosh College
- Occupations: Author; Lyricist
- Awards: Ananda Purashkar

Srijato Bandyopadhyay is an Indian poet of the Bengali language. He won the Ananda Puroskar in 2004 for his book Udanta Sawb Joker: All Those Flying Jokers. In 2014, he won the Filmfare Awards East for Best Lyricist for the song 'Balir Shohor' from 'Mishawr Rawhoshyo'.

Srijato’s poetic composition 'Megh Bodoler Kabbi' has been published in International Kolkata Bookfair 2020 along with another novel Briksha Onubadak. Besides writing poems and songs, he also does anchoring and Public Speaking. Recently he made his acting debut in Srijit Mukherji's film Zulfiqar. He has also attended a writer's workshop at the University of Iowa.

== Early life ==
Srijato was born in a musical family. He lived at Garia and spent his childhood at Kamdohari, Narkelbagan. Srijato is the grandchild of classical vocalist Sangeetacharya Tarapada Chakraborty and nephew of musician and the Khalifa of Kotali Gharana Pandit Manas Chakraborty; his mother is also a classical vocalist Gaan Saraswati Srila Bandopadhyay. His early schooling was completed to Jadavpur Vidyapith and he graduated from the Asutosh College, a University of Calcutta affiliate.

== Subsequent career ==
Srijato started his writing career in the 1990s. He currently lives in Selimpur, southern Kolkata with his wife Durba. Having worked as a journalist, he is now on the editorial board of the magazine "Prathama".

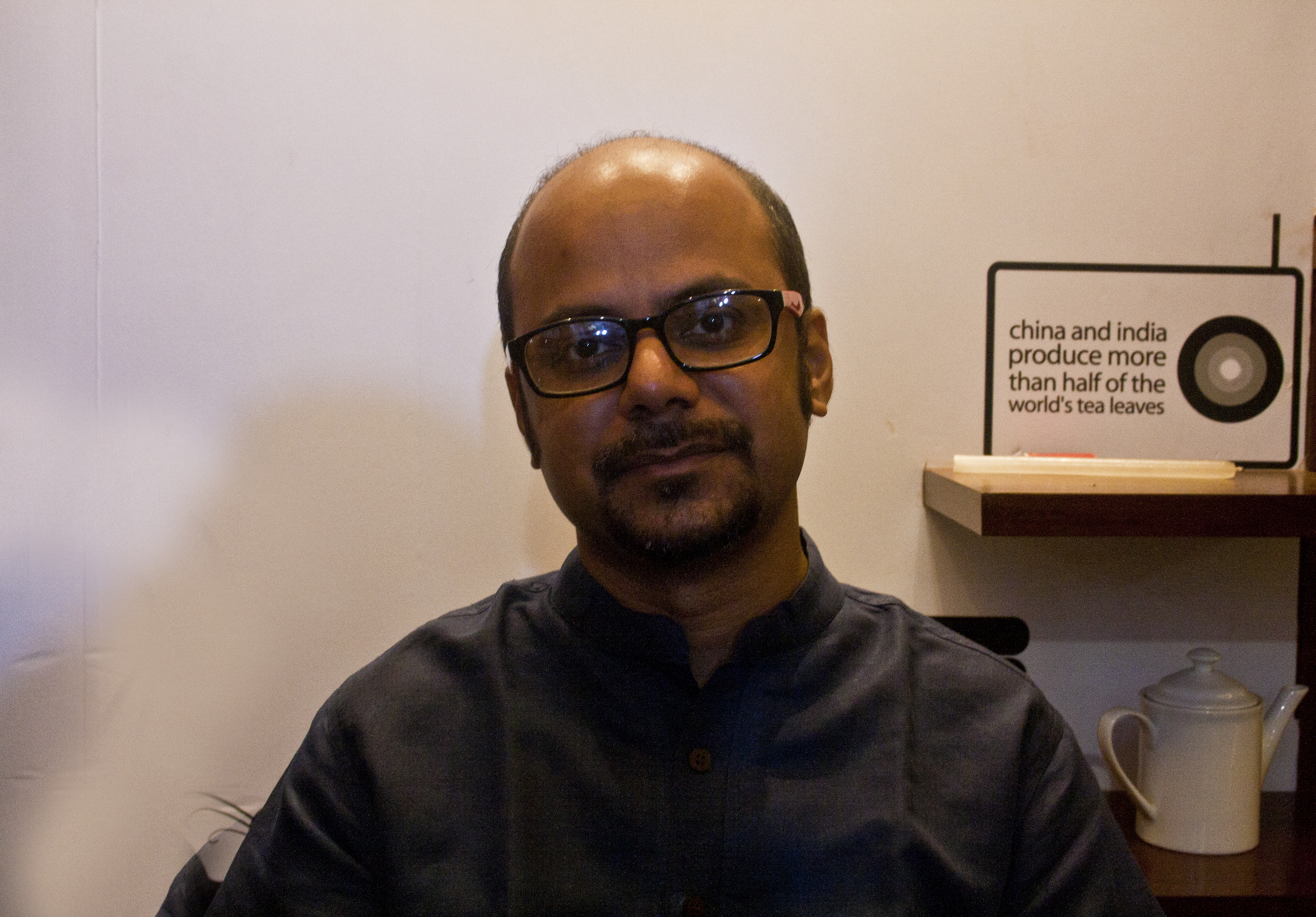
Srijato at Oxford Book Store, Kolkata for the Apeejay Bangla Sahitya Utsob 2015.

== Works ==
His notable works include Chotoder Chiriyakhana: The menagerie for kids (2005), Katiushar golpo: Tales untold (2006), Borshamongol : The monsoon epic (2006), Okalboisakhi: Storms unprecedent (2007), Likhte hole bhodrobhabe lekho: Write politely, if you have to (2002), Ses Chithi: Last Letter (1999), Bombay to Goa (2007), Coffer namti Irish : Irish Coffee (2008), Onubhob korechi tai bolchi : Revealing the feeling (1998).His book of poems, Andhakar Lekhaguchchha was firstly posted in the Facebook by the poet. Every poem of this book is a Sonnet.

He has also written novels. His first novel is "4043".His second novel was published in Pujabarshiki Anondolok, named "Shalimare Shonghat".

== Poem ==
- Sesh Chithi (1999)
- Du-char Katha (2000)
- Anubhab Korchi Tai Bolchi (2001)
- Likhte hole Bhodrobhabe Lekho (2002)
- Uronto Sob Joker (2004)
- Chotoder Chiriyakhana (2005)
- Katiushar Golpo (2006)
- Borshamongol (2006)
- Okalboisakhi (2007)
- Bombay To Goa (2007)
- coffee'r Namti Irish (2008)
- Betu Ar Jethu (2008)
- Emni Boi (2009)
- Sesh Chithi Du-char Katha (2009)
- Combinasia (2010)
- Kichu Kobita (2011)
- Chhai Ronger Gram (2011)
- Train Haranor Gondho (2012)
- Amar Santa Thakur (2012) (Prose)
- Ami Ar William (2013)
- Karkatkrantir Desh (2014)
- Bandhobi Gach (2015)
- Kobita Somogro-I (2015)
- Andhakar Lekhaguchchha (2015)
- Kobita Somogro II (2016)
- Shalimare Songhat (2017) (Novel)
- Premer Kobita (2017)
- Mushtaq Hussain er Dorbari (2017)
- Taravora Akasher Niche (2018) (Novel)
- Dhongso (2018)
- Lymeric (2018)
- Srijator Facebook (2018) (a collection of Facebook posts)
- Je Jotsna Harinatito (2019)
- Je Kotha Boloni Aage (2019) (Novel)
- Ja Kichu Aaj Byaktigoto (2019) (Prose)
- Megh Bodoler Kabbi (2020)
- Briksha Onubadok (2020) (Novel)
- Srijator Facebook ii (2020) (a collection of facebook posts)
- Sababahika (2021)
- Kuyashanagarir Upaksyan (2021)(Novel)
- Apel Katar Chhuri o Sthaniyo Karatkol (2023)

== Lyrics ==
Year	Films	Songs	Composers
2010	033		Chandrabindoo
2010	Autograph	Chal Rastay	Debojyoti Mishra
2011	Jiyo Kaka	All Songs	Neel Dutt, Rupam Islam, Chandrabindoo
2011	Uro Chithi		
2011	Shotru	All Songs	Indraadip Dasgupta
2011	Iti Mrinalini		
2011	Chaplin		
2011	Jaani Dyakha Hawbe	Thik Thakish, Jaani Dekha Hobe, Phire Jaa Re Mon Ja,	Indradeep Dasgupta
2011	Abosheshey		Prabuddha Banerjee
2012	Charuulata		
2012	Ekla Akash	Chai Udaan	Jeet Gannguli
2012	Paanch Adhyay		Shantanu Moitra
2013	Namte Namte		
2013	Mrs. Sen	Ghar Aaja	Indraadip Dasgupta
2013	C/O Sir	All Songs	Raja Narayan Deb
2013	Mishawr Rawhoshyo	All Songs	Indraadip Dasgupta
2013	Chander Pahar	Chander Pahar	Indraadip Dasgupta
2014	Obhishopto Nighty	Roddur, Sadher Lighty	Indraadip Dasgupta
2014	Khaad		Indraadip Dasgupta
2018	Kabir	Akasheo Alpo Neel, Maula (Tere Darga Pe)	Indraadip Dasgupta
2018	Ek Je Chhilo Raja	Esho hey	Indraadip Dasgupta
2021	Golondaaj	"Juddhang Dehi", Rasher Gaan	Bickram Ghosh
2021	Tonic	"E Mon Eka-Female Version" ,"E Mon Eka-Male Version"	Jeet Gannguli
2022	Kakababur Protyaborton	All Songs	Indraadip Dasgupta
2024	Pushpa 2: The Rule	All songs (Dubbed Bengali version)	Devi Sri Prasad
2024	Shastri	All Songs	Indraadip Dasgupta

== Awards ==
- 2004 : Ananda Puraskar - উড়ন্ত সব জোকার (Poetry)
- 2014 : Filmfare Awards East for Best Lyricist - "Balir Shohor" from Mishawr Rawhoshyo
- 2014 : Bangla Academy Award- কর্কটক্রান্তির দেশ (Poetry)

== See also ==
- Haath Dhoreche Gaacher Paata
