= Aryann Bhowmik =

Bengali film actor (born 1992)

- Born: Devdaan Bhowmik; 9 October 1992 (age 33); Kolkata, India
- Occupation: Actor
- Years active: 2008–present

Aryann Bhowmik (born 1992) is a Bengali film actor is best known for his work in the 2011 Bengali film Chalo Paltai. His acting has made a mark in the Tollywood arena. Apart from films, Aryann has also made appearances in television and shows. His collaboration with renowned Bengali actor Prosenjit Chatterjee brought him into the limelight. His earlier name was Devdaan, which he changed to Aryann in 2013.

== Career ==
Bhowmik made his first appearance with the 2008 Bengali film, Neel Rajar Deshe, when he was in Class 8. In this film, he got a chance to work with actors Indrani Haldar and Ashish Vidyarthi. In an interview with The Times of India, he said that he got the chance to work in the film without an audition. According to him, director Riingo Banerjee had auditioned 20 to 22 kids for a character in the film, but he didn't like any of them. Singer Saptak Bhattacharjee, who is a close acquaintance of Aryann and who sang a number of songs for the film, showed Aryann's photo to Riingo in his mobile phone. On seeing his picture, Riingo immediately decided that the role should be assigned to Aryann. This incident marked Aryann's debut in the Bengali film industry. Later on, in 2011, Aryann made a grand appearance in the Bengali film Chalo Paltai by Haranath Chakraborty, where he played the role of Prosenjit Chatterjee's son. Aryann regards Chalo Paltai as his official entry into films. He is also the leading man of R. K. Gupta's upcoming directorial debut, Window Connection. Apart from doing films, Aryann also excels in Karate and dance.

== Filmography ==
=== Films ===
Year	Film	Role	Director	Producer	Language	Notes
2008	Neel Rajar Deshe	Raja	Riingo Banerjee	Miracle Movies	Bengali	Film Debut
2011	Cholo Paltai	Gourav	Haranath Chakraborty	Shri Venkatesh Films	Bengali	Film
2013	Mishawr Rawhoshyo	Shontu	Srijit Mukherji	Shri Venkatesh Films	Bengali	Film
2014	Window Connection	Rahul	R. K. Gupta	BMW Entertainment	Bengali	Film
2015	Detective Byomkesh Bakshy	Young Revolutionary	Dibakar Banerjee	Yashraj Films - DBP	Hindi	Film
2015	Force	Guest App	Raja Chanda	Essel Vision-nIdeas	Bengali	Film
2017	Messi	Messi	Riingo Banerjee	Macneil Entertainment	Bengali	Film
2017	Yeti Obhijaan	Shontu	Srijit Mukherjee	Shri Venkatesh Films	Bengali	Film
2017	Love Choturdoshi	Shilu	Mandar Banerjee	Equinox Films	Bengali	Short Film
2017	Byomkesh-Rokter Daag	Satyakaam	Shoumik Chatterjee	Shri Venkatesh Films-Hoi Choi	Bengali	WebSeries
2018	Abhimani	Hero	Tuhin- SVF Music	SVF Music-Sangeet Bangla	Bengali	Music Video
2018	Titas	Hero	JoyDip-Utsav	ZIP Music	Bengali	Music Video
2019	The Hacker	Remo	Subrata-Siddharth	Lace Style Films	Bengali	Film
2019	Bhoot Chaturdashi	Rono	Shabbir	Shri Venkatesh Films	Bengali	Film
2019	Purba Paschim Dakshin	Tenia	Rajorshi Dey	Just Studio	Bengali	Film
2019	Durgeshgorer Guptodhon	Dumble	Dhruvo Banerjee	Shri Venkatesh Films	Bengali	Film
2019	Swapne Dekha Rajkanya	Hero	Sandy Saha	Sandy Saha	Bengali	Short Film
2020	Sunglass	Samrat	Arijit Sarkar	Samrat Films	Bengali	Short Film
2020	Ammit	Ammit	Basudev Krishna	Krishna Films	Bengali	Short Film
2020	Break Up Story	Som	Mainak Bhaumik	Hoi Choi	Bengali	Web Series
2022	Kakababur Protyaborton	Sontu	Srijit Mukherjee	Shri Venkatesh Films	Bengali	Film
2022	Maidaan	Neville D'Souza	Amit Sharma	Baywatch Entertainment	Hindi	Film
2022	Oprokashito	Joy Chatterjee	Soham	Swarnali Productions	Bengali	Film
2022	BROWN	Saikat	Abhinoy Deo	ZEE Studio	Hindi	Web Series
2022	36 Hours	Anish	Sankho	FunFlix	Bengali	Web Series
2022	Bijoya Dashami	Indra	Shouvik	Drishti Productions	Bengali	Film
2022	Mon Matal	Suman	Dipankar Banerjee	VK Productions	Bengali	Film
2022	Bhooter Pallay Bhootnath	Bhootnath	Bidisha Chatterjee	SBA Films	Bengali	Film
2022	Syndicate	Gobinda	Samiran	Arindam-Sougata	Bengali	Short Film
2022	Alauddin er Notebook	Aarav	Soumavo	Soumavo	Bengali	Web Series
2022	Albela Mon	Hero	Arijit	Liza	Bengali	Music Video
2022	Mon Kharaper Golpo	Anik	Ajitava	MOJO	Bengali	Web Series
2023	Ek Khan Paan	Hero	MAX	TIMES MUSIC	Bengali	Music Video
2023	Ghosh Babur Retirement Plan	Tutu	Haranath Chakrabarty	Surinder Films-Adda Times	Bengali	Webseries
2023	In a Relationship 2	Hero	HoiChoi Team	HoiChoi TV	Bengali	Mini Series
2023	Prem Perfume	Hero	Hoichoi Team	Hoichoi TV	Bengali	Mini Series
2023	Ar Ektu Dao	Hero	SK RAHUL	RS Filmworks	Bengali	Film
2023	Cafe Wall	Hero	Arodipto	PDG Entertainment	Bengali	Film
2023	Tobuo Bhalobasi	Bittu Adhikary	Robin Nambiar	Eskay Movies	Bengali	Film
2023	Grihostho	Debu	Mainak Bhowmik	Eskay Movies	Bengali	Film
2023	BHROM	Hero	Raaj	SK Productions	Bengali	Film
2024	How are you Firoz	Firoz	Rupsa	Rupsa Productions	English	Film
2024	Tekka (25th Film)	TinTin	Srijit Mukherjee	Dev Entertainment	Bengali	Film
2024	Check In Check Out	Magician	Satrajit Sen	Tripod Entertainment	Bengali	Film
2024	Slayer	Hero	Deep	SK Productions	Bengali	Film
2024	Bondhura Elomelo	Dev	Hoi Choi	Hoi Choi Productions	Bengali	Mini Series
2024	Chill Kar Na	Rahul	Animikh	Hoi Choi Productions	Bengali	Mini Series
2024	Kulup	Hero	Shuvojit	MD Productions	Bengali	Short Film
2024	O Mon Bhromon	Rik	Raajhorshi Dey	MAS Productions	Bengali	Film
2024	GOURI	Hero	Prosenjit Halder	LPD Entertainment	Bengali	Film
2025	The Last Joint	Artist	Bodhisatya Mazumdar	Spoilt Child Production	Bengali	Short Film
2025	Automatic Prem	Akash	Pronoy Dasgupta	PD Productions	Bengali	Short Film
2025	Vijaynagar'er Hirey	Shontu	Chandrashish Roy	SVF & nIdeas	Bengali	Film
2026	ICU	APU	Souvik Dey	MJ Productions	Bengali	Film
2026	OSTORAG	Debjyoti	Director	SK Productions	Bengali	Film
2026	SINGHABAHINI	Arjun	Sangita Sanyal	Sree Ganapati Film	Bengali	Film
2026	ATABI	Sourav	Soumavo	S Productions	Bengali	Film

Television
Year	Show	Role	Channel	Notes
2009	Soti	Somnath	Zee Bangla	Lead Role
2019	Thakumar Jhuli	Neelkamal	Star Jalsha	Episodic Role
2020–2021	Titli	Sunny/Nandan	Star Jalsha	Lead Role
2025	Video Bouma	Akash	Sun Bangla	Lead Role
