= 22nd National Film Awards =

Indian ceremony celebrating cinema of 1974

- Awarded for: Best of Indian cinema in 1974
- Awarded by: Directorate of Film Festivals
- Presented by: Fakhruddin Ali Ahmed (President of India)
- Presented on: 1976
- Official website: dff.nic.in

Highlights
- Best Feature Film: Chorus
- Dadasaheb Phalke Award: B. N. Reddy
- Most awards: Sonar Kella (5)

The 22nd National Film Awards, presented by Directorate of Film Festivals, the organisation set up by Ministry of Information and Broadcasting, India to celebrate the best of Indian Cinema released in 1974.

On the occasion of 25th Anniversary of India's Independence, two special awards were given for Best Feature Film and Best Short Film. Starting with 22nd National Film Awards, President's Gold and Silver Medal awards were renamed to Swarna Kamal (Golden Lotus) and Rajat Kamal (Silver Lotus) respectively.

== Juries ==
Two different committees were formed for feature films and short films, headed by Bhagwan Sahay and Prasanta Sanyal respectively.

- Jury Members: Feature Films
  - Bhagwan Sahay (Chairperson) • Adoor Gopalakrishnan • Amala Shankar • Ananta Patnaik • Arjun Jairamdas • Balwant Gargi
  - Elangbam Nilakanta Singh • Emani Sankara Sastry • H. Venkat Subbiah • Karuna Banerjee • Keshav Rao • Kiranmoy Raha
  - M. Bilgrami • O. V. Vijayan • Arun Ramavtar Poddar • Rajendra Avasthy • Ranu Barua • Reoti Sharan Sharna
  - Sai Paranjpye • Satish Bahadur • Shanta Gandhi • T. K. Mahadevan • Vijay Tendulkar • M. Yunus Dehlvi
- Jury Members: Short Films
  - Prasanta Sanyal (Chairperson) • Bishamber Khanna • Gargi Dutt • Inder Lal Dass • Jag Mohan • S. Mohinder

== Awards ==
Awards were divided into feature films and non-feature films.

President's Gold Medal for the All India Best Feature Film is now better known as National Film Award for Best Feature Film, whereas President's Gold Medal for the Best Documentary Film is analogous to today's National Film Award for Best Non-Feature Film. For children's films, Prime Minister's Gold Medal is now given as National Film Award for Best Children's Film. At the regional level, President's Silver Medal for Best Feature Film is now given as National Film Award for Best Feature Film in a particular language. Certificate of Merit in all the categories is discontinued over the years.

=== Lifetime Achievement Award ===
| Name of Award | Image | Awardee(s) | Awarded As | Cash prize |
|---|---|---|---|---|
| Dadasaheb Phalke Award | | B. N. Reddy | Producer | Swarna Kamal, ₹20,000 and a Shawl |

=== Special awards ===
On the occasion of 25th Anniversary of India's Independence, two special awards were given for Best Feature Film and Best Short-Film.

| Award | Film | Language | Awardee(s) | Cash prize |
|---|---|---|---|---|
| Best Feature Film on the 25th Anniversary of India's Independence | Uttarayanam (Note: P. K. Mohandas (Leading Actor) and Radhamani (Leading Actress) were awarded with the medallion.) | Malayalam | Producer: Pattathuvila Karunakaran | Rajat Kamal, ₹30,000 and a certificate |
| Best Feature Film on the 25th Anniversary of India's Independence | Uttarayanam | Malayalam | Director: G. Aravindan | Rajat Kamal, ₹10,000 and a certificate |
| Best Short-Film on the 25th Anniversary of India's Independence | I | English | Producer: S. Krishnaswamy | Rajat Kamal, ₹5,000 and a certificate |
| Best Short-Film on the 25th Anniversary of India's Independence | I | English | Director: S. Krishnaswamy | Rajat Kamal, ₹4,000 and a certificate |

=== Feature films ===
Feature films were awarded at All India as well as regional level. For 22nd National Film Awards, a Bengali film Chorus won the President's Gold Medal for the All India Best Feature Film; whereas another Bengali film, Sonar Kella won the maximum number of awards (five). Following were the awards given in each category:

==== All India Award ====
Following were the awards given:

| Award | Film | Language | Awardee(s) | Cash prize |
|---|---|---|---|---|
| Best Feature Film | Chorus (Note: Utpal Dutt (Leading Actor) and Gita Sen (Leading Actress) were awarded with the medallion.) | Bengali | Producer: Mrinal Sen Productions | Swarna Kamal, ₹40,000 and a certificate |
| Best Feature Film | Chorus | Bengali | Director: Mrinal Sen | Rajat Kamal, ₹15,000 and a certificate |
| Second Best Feature Film | Ankur (Note: Anant Nag (Leading Actor) and Shabana Azmi (Leading Actress) were awarded with the medallion.) | Hindi | Producer: Blaze Film Enterprises | Rajat Kamal, ₹15,000 and a certificate |
| Second Best Feature Film | Ankur | Hindi | Director: Shyam Benegal | Rajat Kamal, ₹10,000 and a certificate |
| Best Feature Film on National Integration | Parinay (Note: Romesh Sharma (Leading Actor) and Shabana Azmi (Leading Actress) were awarded with the medallion.) | Hindi | Producer: Samantar Chitra | Rajat Kamal, ₹30,000 and a certificate |
| Best Feature Film on National Integration | Parinay | Hindi | Director: Kantilal Rathod | Rajat Kamal, ₹10,000 and a certificate |
| Best Feature Film with Mass Appeal, Wholesome Entertainment and Aesthetic Value | Kora Kagaz (Note: Vijay Anand (Leading Actor) and Jaya Bhaduri (Leading Actress) were awarded with the medallion.) | Hindi | Producer: Sanat Kothari for Shreeji Films | Swarna Kamal and a Certificate |
| Best Feature Film with Mass Appeal, Wholesome Entertainment and Aesthetic Value | Kora Kagaz | Hindi | Director: Anil Ganguly | Rajat Kamal and a certificate |
| Best Direction | Sonar Kella | Bengali | Satyajit Ray | Rajat Kamal, ₹20,000 and a Certificate |
| Best Cinematography (Black and White) | Chorus | Bengali | K. K. Mahajan | Rajat Kamal, ₹5,000 and a certificate |
| Best Cinematography (Color) | Sonar Kella | Bengali | Soumendu Roy | Rajat Kamal, ₹5,000 and a certificate |
| Best Actor | Ankur | Hindi | Sadhu Meher | Rajat Kamal, ₹10,000 and a certificate |
| Best Actress | Ankur | Hindi | Shabana Azmi | Rajat Kamal, ₹10,000 and a certificate |
| Best Child Artist | Sonar Kella | Bengali | Kushal Chakraborty | Rajat Kamal, ₹5,000 and a certificate |
| Best Male Playback Singer | Rajnigandha (For the song "Kai Baar Yoon Bhi") | Hindi | Mukesh | Rajat Kamal and a certificate |
| Best Female Playback Singer | Kora Kagaz | Hindi | Lata Mangeshkar | Rajat Kamal and a certificate |
| Best Music Direction | Chorus | Bengali | Ananda Shankar | Rajat Kamal, ₹10,000 and a certificate |
| Best Screenplay | Sonar Kella | Bengali | Satyajit Ray | Rajat Kamal, ₹10,000 and a certificate |
| Best Story | Jukti Takko Aar Gappo | Bengali | Ritwik Ghatak | Rajat Kamal, ₹10,000 and a certificate |
| Best Lyrics | Alluri Seetharama Raju | Telugu | Srirangam Srinivasarao | ₹10,000 and a certificate |

==== Regional Award ====
The awards were given to the best films made in the regional languages of India. For feature films in Assamese, English, Gujarati, Hindi, Kashmiri, Meitei, Marathi, Oriya, Punjabi, Tamil and Telugu language, President's Silver Medal for Best Feature Film was not given.

| Award | Film | Awardee(s) | Cash prize |
|---|---|---|---|
| Best Feature Film in Bengali | Sonar Kella (Note: Soumitra Chatterjee (Leading Actor) was awarded with the medallion.) | Producer: Information and Public Relations Department, Government of West Bengal | Rajat Kamal, ₹10,000 and a Certificate |
| Best Feature Film in Bengali | Sonar Kella | Director: Satyajit Ray | Rajat Kamal and a Certificate |
| Best Feature Film in Kannada | Kankana (Note: H. B. Yajaman (Leading Actor) and A. Revathi (Leading Actress) were awarded with the medallion.) | Producer: Hamzu Jagalur Imam for Mayura Films Pvt. Ltd | Rajat Kamal, ₹10,000 and a Certificate |
| Best Feature Film in Kannada | Kankana | Director: M. B. S. Prasad | Rajat Kamal, ₹5,000 and a Certificate |
| Best Feature Film in Malayalam | Uttarayanam | Producer: Pattathuvila Karunakaran | Rajat Kamal, ₹10,000 and a Certificate |
| Best Feature Film in Malayalam | Uttarayanam | Director: G. Aravindan | Rajat Kamal, ₹5,000 and a Certificate |

=== Non-Feature films ===
Following were the awards given:

==== Short films and Documentaries ====
| Award | Film | Language | Awardee(s) | Cash prize |
|---|---|---|---|---|
| Best Information Film (Documentary) | Man In Search of Man | English | Producer: G. P. Asthana for Films Division | Rajat Kamal, ₹5,000 and a Certificate |
| Best Information Film (Documentary) | Man In Search of Man | English | Director: Prem Vaidya for Films Division | Rajat Kamal, ₹4,000 and a Certificate |
| Best Educational / Instructional Film | Atoms | English | Producer: (Late) Pramod Pati for Films Division | Rajat Kamal, ₹5,000 and a Certificate |
| Best Educational / Instructional Film | Atoms | English | Director: M. M. Chaudhuri of I. I. T., Kanpur | Rajat Kamal, ₹4,000 and a Certificate |
| Best Film on Social Documentation | Behind the Breadline | English | Producer: S. Sukhdev | Rajat Kamal, ₹5,000 and a Certificate |
| Best Film on Social Documentation | Behind the Breadline | English | Director: S. Sukhdev | Rajat Kamal, ₹5,000 and a Certificate |
| Best Promotional Film (Commercial) | To Serve Is To Love | English | Producer: Cinerad Communications for Air India | Rajat Kamal and a Certificate |
| Best Promotional Film (Commercial) | To Serve Is To Love | English | Director: Zafar Hai | Rajat Kamal and a Certificate |
| Best Promotional Film (Non-Commercial) | Ek Anek Aur Ekta | Hindi | Producer: Bhimsain | Rajat Kamal and a Certificate |
| Best Promotional Film (Non-Commercial) | Ek Anek Aur Ekta | Hindi | Director: Vijaya Mulay | Rajat Kamal and a Certificate |
| Best Animation Film | Synthesis | English | Producer: B. R. Shendge | Rajat Kamal, ₹5,000 and a Certificate |
| Best Animation Film | Synthesis | English | Director: A. R. Sen and B. R. Dohling | Rajat Kamal, ₹4,000 and a Certificate |

=== Awards not given ===
Following were the awards not given as no film was found to be suitable for the award:

- Best Film on Family Welfare
- Best Children's Film
- Best Experimental Film
- President's Silver Medal for Best Feature Film in Assamese
- President's Silver Medal for Best Feature Film in English
- President's Silver Medal for Best Feature Film in Hindi
- President's Silver Medal for Best Feature Film in Manipuri
- President's Silver Medal for Best Feature Film in Marathi
- President's Silver Medal for Best Feature Film in Oriya
- President's Silver Medal for Best Feature Film in Punjabi
- President's Silver Medal for Best Feature Film in Tamil
- President's Silver Medal for Best Feature Film in Telugu
