= Bishamber =

Bishamber, Bishambar or Bishambhar is an Indian masculine given name that may refer to

- Bishamber Khanna, Indian painter and enamelist
- Bishambhar Nath Pande (1906–1998), Indian freedom fighter, social worker and parliamentarian
- Bishamber Singh (born 1969), Indian Politician
- Bishambar Singh (1940–2004), Indian wrestler
- Bhishambar Nath, fictional villain in the 1989 Indian film Ram Lakhan, played by Amrish Puri
