= Jaisalmer Fort =

Fort in Jaisalmer, Rajasthan, India

- Swarna Durg, Jaisalmer Quilla or Sonar Quila/Kella
- Jaisalmer, Rajasthan, India
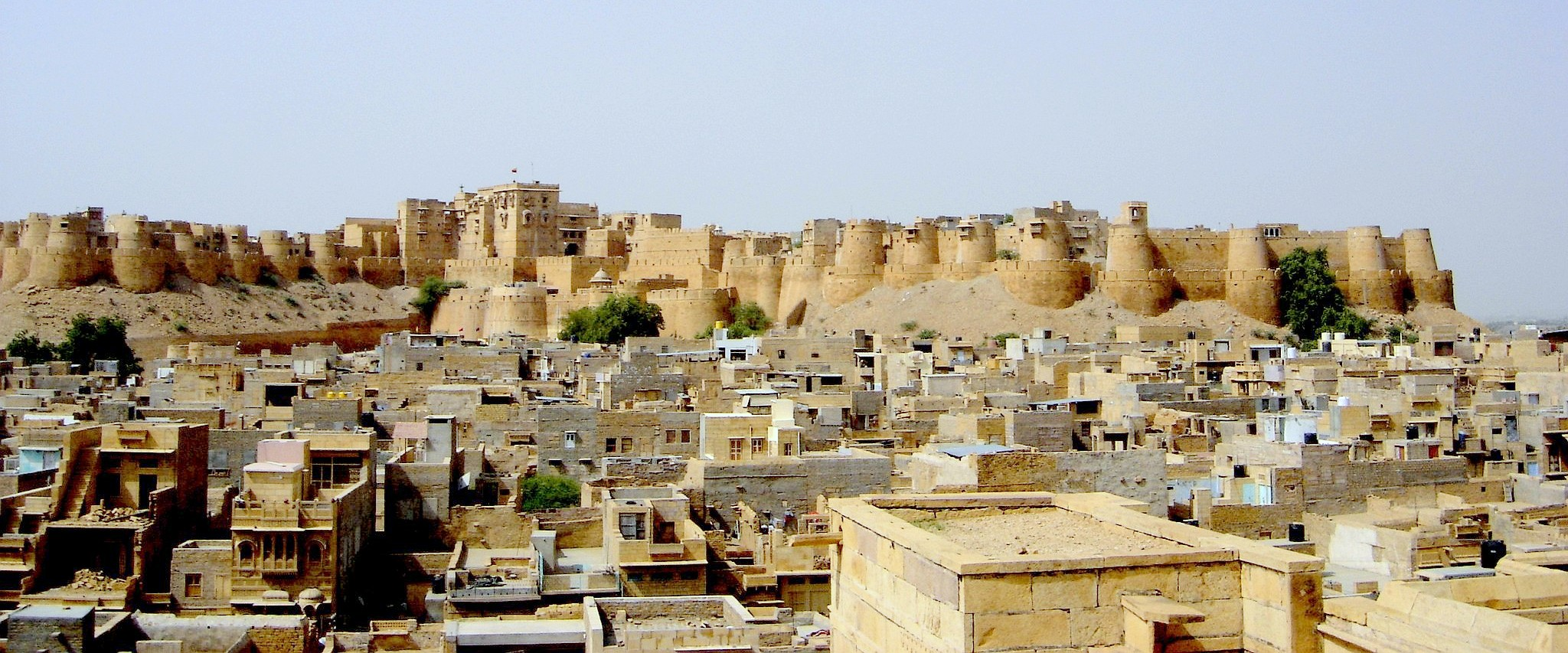
- Jaisalmer Fort

Site information
- Type: Desert fortification
- Controlled by: Archaeological Survey of India
- Open to the public: Yes
- Condition: Protected Monument

Location
- Location of Jaisalmer Fort in Rajasthan
- Location within India Location within Rajasthan
- Coordinates: 26.9127°N 70.9126°E

Site history
- Built: 1156; 870 years ago
- Built by: Rawal Jaisal
- Materials: Yellow Sandstone

Garrison information
- Occupants: About a quarter of Jaisalmer's population

UNESCO World Heritage Site
- Type: Cultural
- Criteria: ii, iii
- Designated: 2013 (36th session)
- Part of: Hill Forts of Rajasthan
- Reference no.: 247
- Region: South Asia

Jaisalmer Fort is situated in the city of Jaisalmer, in the Indian state of Rajasthan. It is one of the very few "living forts" in the world (such as Carcassonne, France), as nearly one fourth of the old city's population still resides within the fort. For the better part of its 860-year history, the fort was the city of Jaisalmer. The first settlements outside the fort walls, to accommodate the growing population of Jaisalmer, are said to have come up in the 17th century.

Jaisalmer Fort is the second oldest fort in Rajasthan, built in 1156 AD by the Rawal (ruler) Jaisal from whom it derives its name, and stood at the crossroads of important trade routes (including the ancient Silk road).

The fort's massive yellow sandstone walls are a tawny lion colour during the day, fading to honey-gold as the sun sets, thereby camouflaging the fort in the yellow desert. For this reason, it is also known as the Swarn Durg, Sonar Quila or Golden Fort. The name Sonar Kella (Bengali for Golden Fortress) was popularized by tourists after the famous Bengali film of the same name, which was shot in this fort by eminent filmmaker Satyajit Ray. The fort stands amidst the sandy expanse of the great Thar Desert on Trikuta Hill, hence also known as Trikutgarh. It is today located along the southern edge of the city that bears its name; its dominant hilltop location making the sprawling towers of its fortifications visible for many miles around.

In 2013, at the 37th session of the World Heritage Committee held in Phnom Penh, Cambodia, Jaisalmer Fort, along with five other forts of Rajasthan, was declared a UNESCO World Heritage Site under the group Hill Forts of Rajasthan.

== History ==
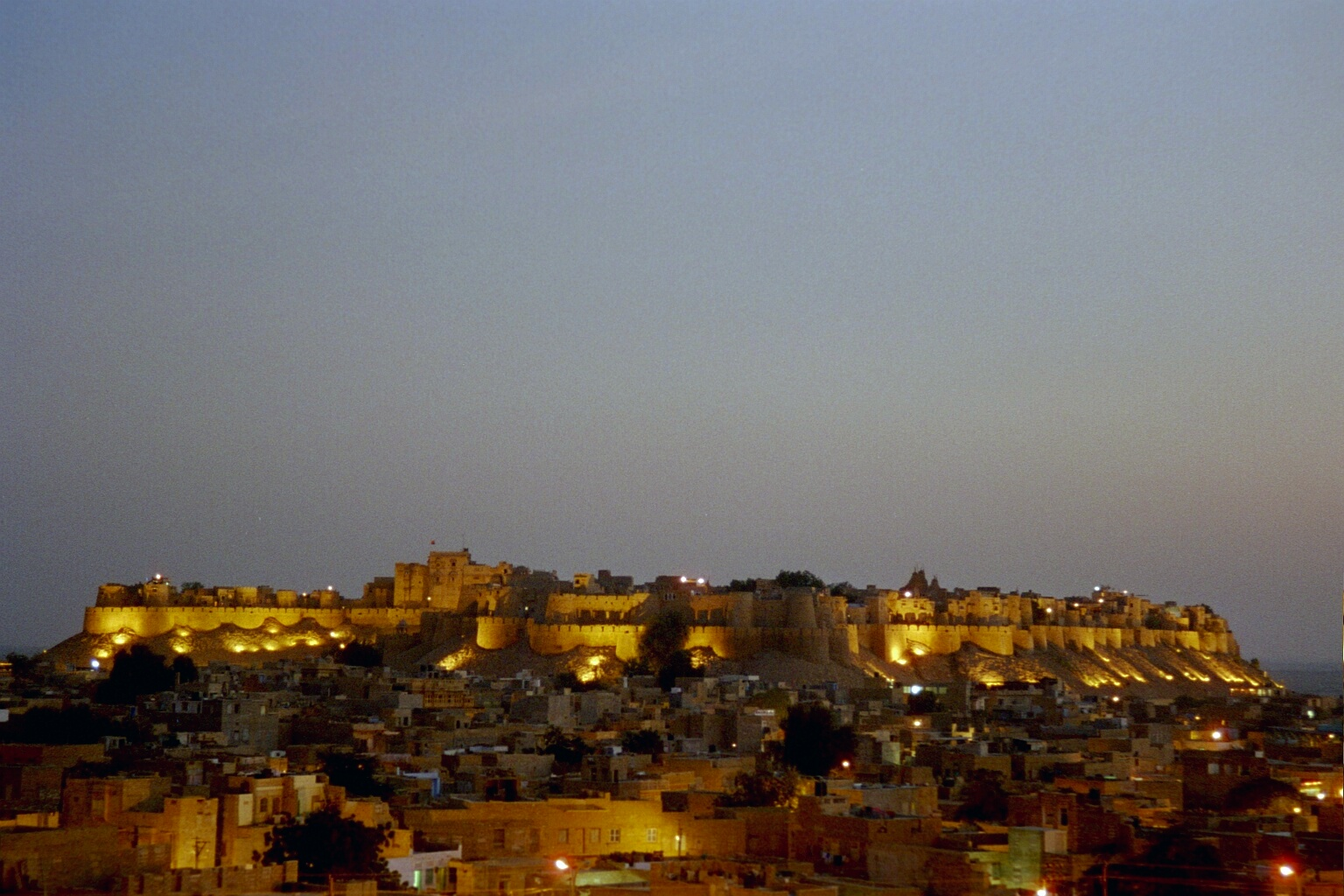
A view of the fortress above the city, in the evening

Legend has it that the fort was built by Rawal Jaisal, a Bhati Rajput, in 1156 CE. The story says that it superseded an earlier construction at Lodhruva, with which Jaisal was unsatisfied and thus, a new capital was established when Jaisal founded the city of Jaisalmer.

Around 1299 AD, Rawal Jait Singh I faced a long siege by Alauddin Khalji of Delhi Sultanate, who is said to have been provoked by a Bhati raid on his treasure caravan. By the end of the siege, facing certain defeat, the Bhati Rajput women committed 'Jauhar', and the male warriors under the command of Mularaja met their fatal end in battle with the Sultan's forces. For a few years after the successful siege, the fort remained under the sway of Delhi Sultanate, before being eventually reoccupied by some surviving Bhatis.

During Rawal Lunakaran's reign, around 1530–1551 AD, the fort was attacked by an Afghan chief Amir Ali. When it seemed to the Rawal that he was fighting a losing battle, he slaughtered his womenfolk as there was insufficient time to arrange a jauhar. Tragically, reinforcements arrived immediately after the deed was done and the army of Jaisalmer became victorious in its defence of the fort.

In 1541 AD, Rawal Lunakaran also fought Mughal emperor Humayun when the latter attacked the fort on his way to Ajmer. He also offered his daughter in marriage to Akbar. Mughals controlled the fort until 1762.

The fort remained under the control of Mughals until 1762, when Maharawal Mulraj took control of the fort.

The treaty between the East India Company and Mulraj on 12 December 1818 allowed the Mulraj to retain control of the fort and provided for protection from invasion. After the death of Mulraj in 1820, his grandson Gaj Singh inherited control of the fort.

With the advent of British rule, the emergence of maritime trade and the growth of the port of Bombay led to the gradual economic decline of Jaisalmer. After independence and the Partition of India, the ancient trade route was totally closed, thus permanently removing the city from its former role of importance in international commerce. Nonetheless, the continued strategic importance of Jaisalmer was demonstrated during the 1965 and 1971 wars between India and Pakistan.

Even though the town of Jaisalmer no longer serves as an important trading city, or as a major military post, the town is still able to earn revenues as a major tourist destination. Initially, the entire population of Jaisalmer lived within the fort, and today the old fort still retains a resident population of about 4,000 people who are largely descended from the Brahmin and Rajput communities. These two communities once served as the workforce for the fort's one time Bhati rulers, which service then entitled the workers to reside on the hilltop and within the walls of the fort. With the slow increase in the area's population, many of the town's residents gradually relocated to the foot of the Trikuta Hill. From there the town's population has since largely spread out well beyond the old walls of the fort, and into the adjacent valley below.

== Architecture ==
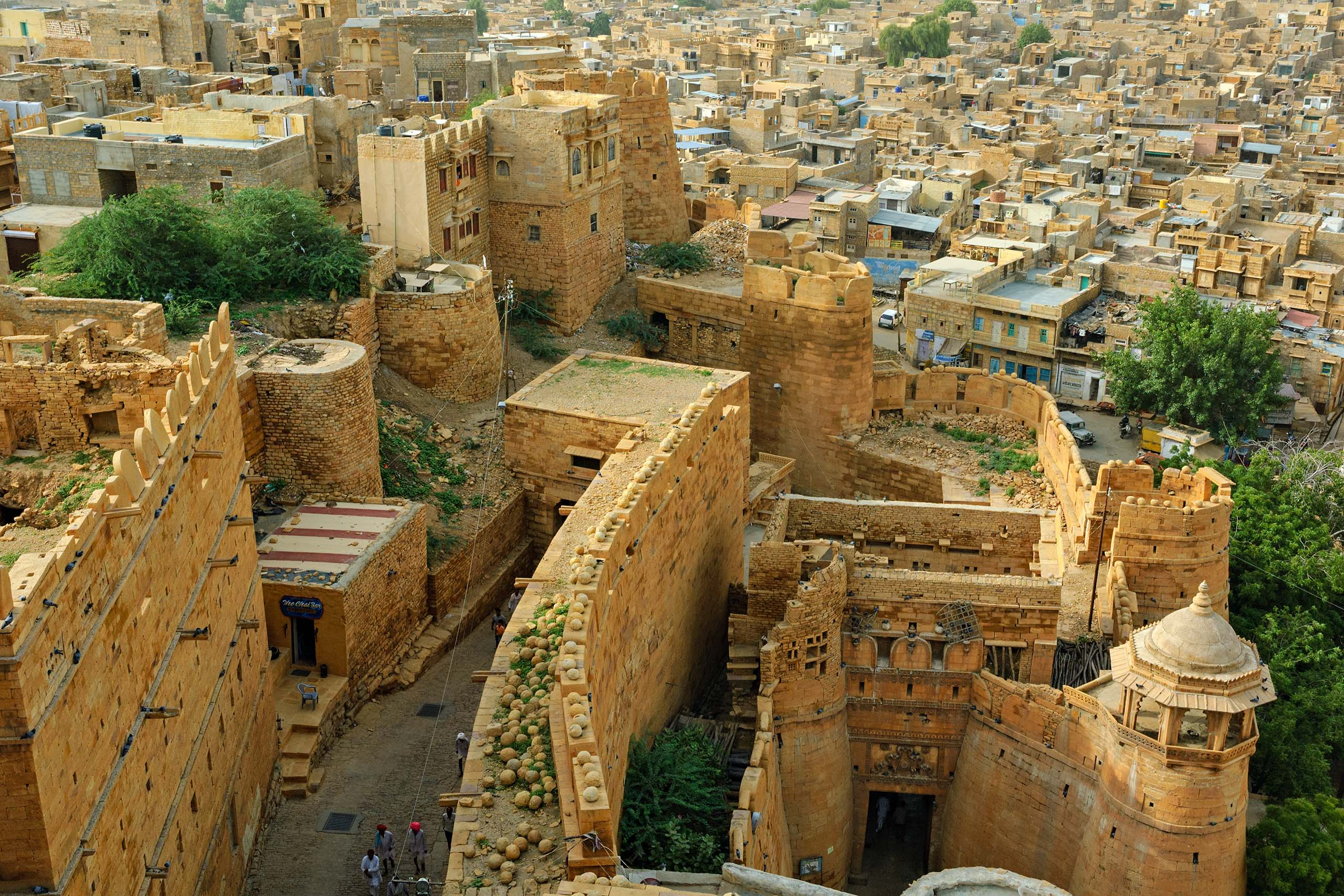
Jaisalmer fort walls and multiple defensive rings at a city gate

The fort is 1,500 ft (460 m) long and 750 ft (230 m) wide and is built on a hill that rises to a height of 250 ft (76 m) above the surrounding countryside. The base of the fort has a 15 ft (4.6 m) tall wall forming the fort's outermost ring, within its triple ringed defence architecture. The fort's upper bastions or towers form a defensive inner-wall perimeter that is about 2.5 mi (4.0 km) long. The fort now incorporates 99 bastions, of which 92 were built or substantially rebuilt between 1633 and 1647. The fort also has four fortified entrances or gates from the townside, one of which was once guarded by cannon. Other points of interest within the fort's walls and grounds include:

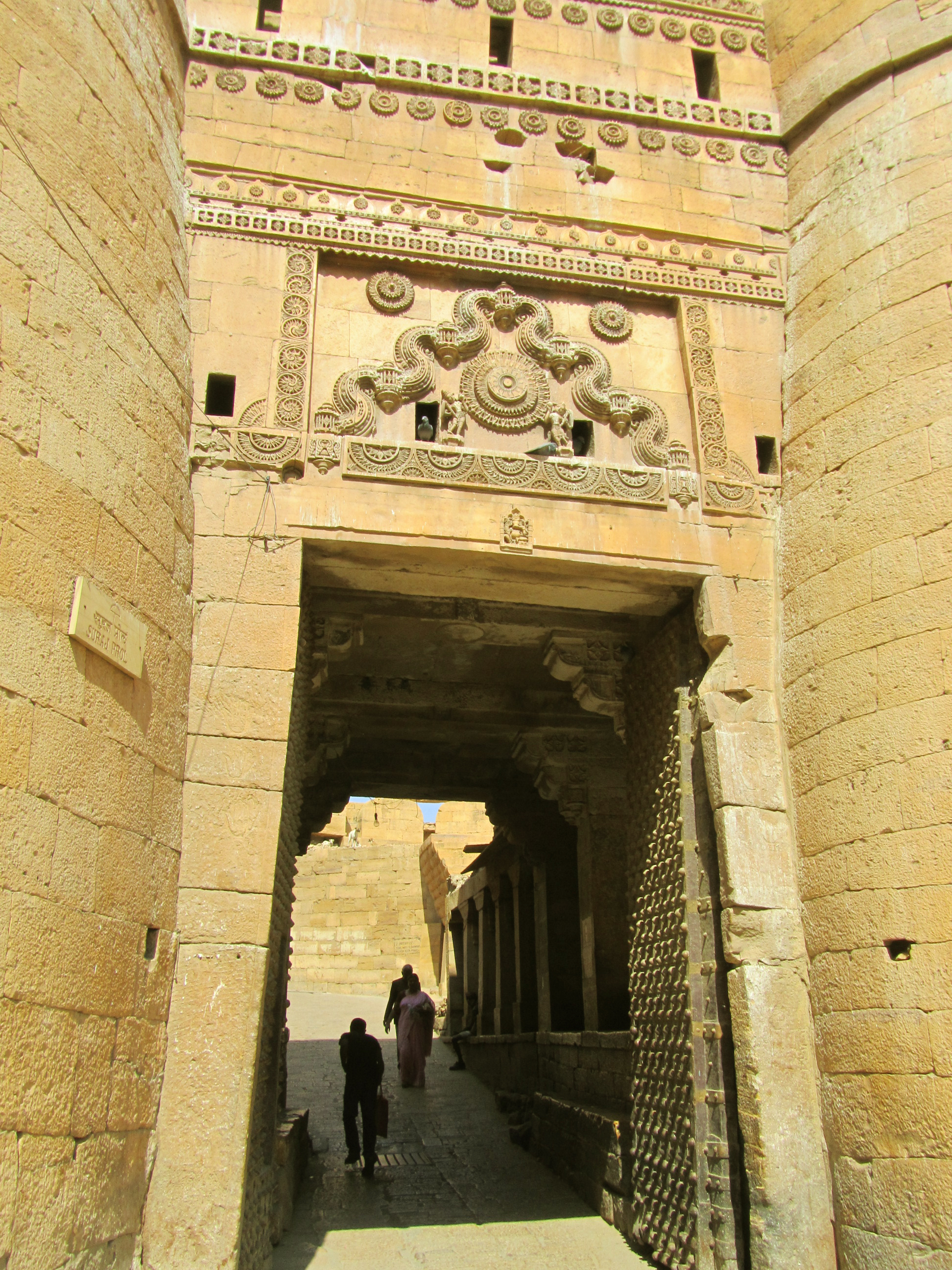
- Suarj Pol, one of the entry gates to the Jaisalmer Fort
  Four massive gateways through which visitors to the fort must pass, situated along with the main approach to the citadel.
- The Raj Mahal Palace, former residence of the Maharawal of Jaisalmer.
- Baa Ri Haveli: This 450-year-old haveli (traditional, ornately decorated residence), once belonging to Brahmin priests who advised the maharajah, now houses a museum on its several levels. Artefacts from all aspects of fort life from cooking to clothing are on display.
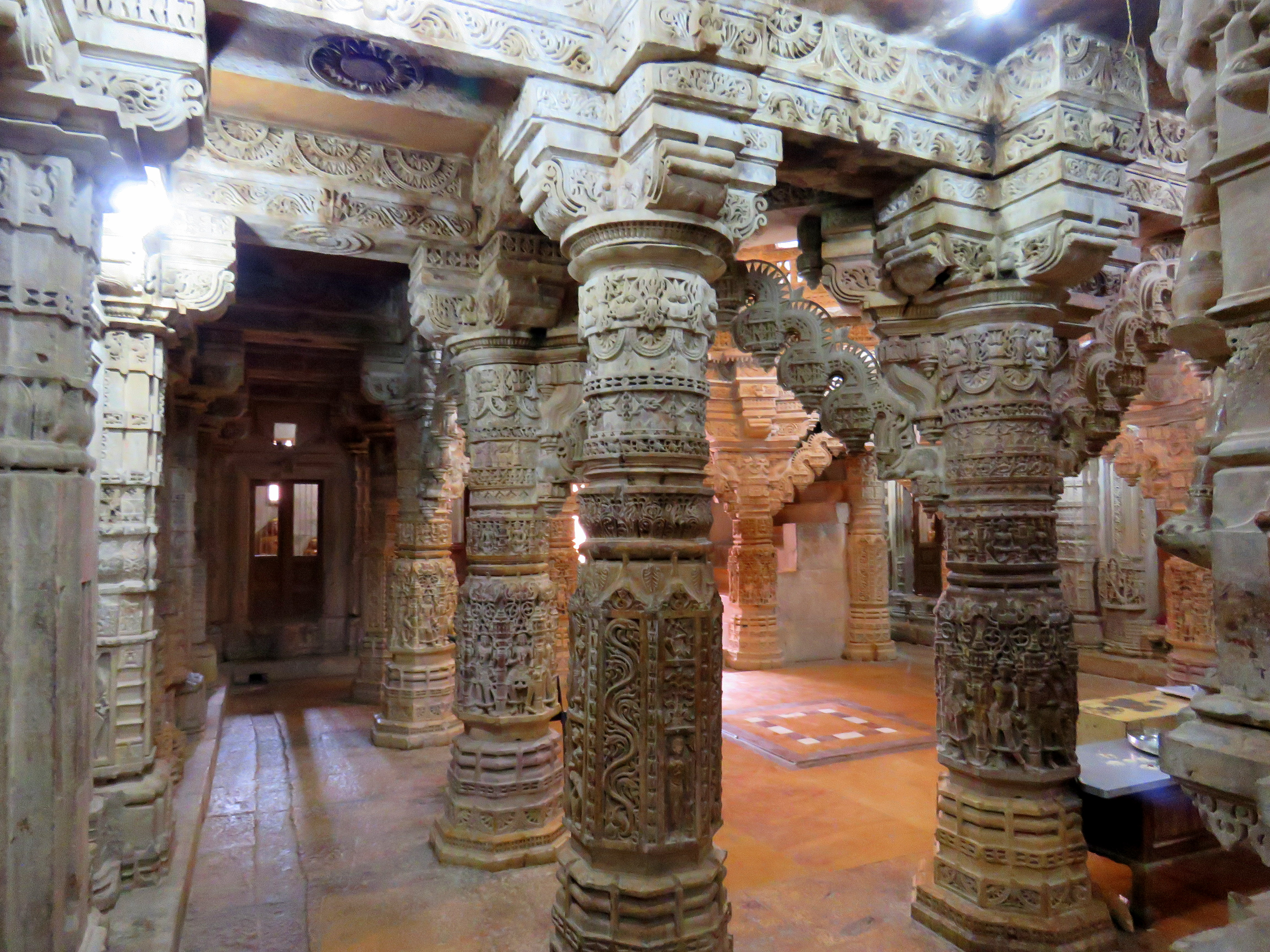
- Corridor of Jain temple – Jaisalmer Fort
  Jain Temples: Inside Jaisalmer Fort, there are 7 Jain temples built by yellow sandstone during 12–16th century. Askaran Chopra of Merta built a huge temple dedicated to Sambhavanatha. The temple has more than 600 idols with many old scriptures. Chopra Panchaji built Ashtapadh temple inside the fort.
- The Laxminath temple of Jaisalmer, dedicated to the worship of the gods Lakshmi and Vishnu.
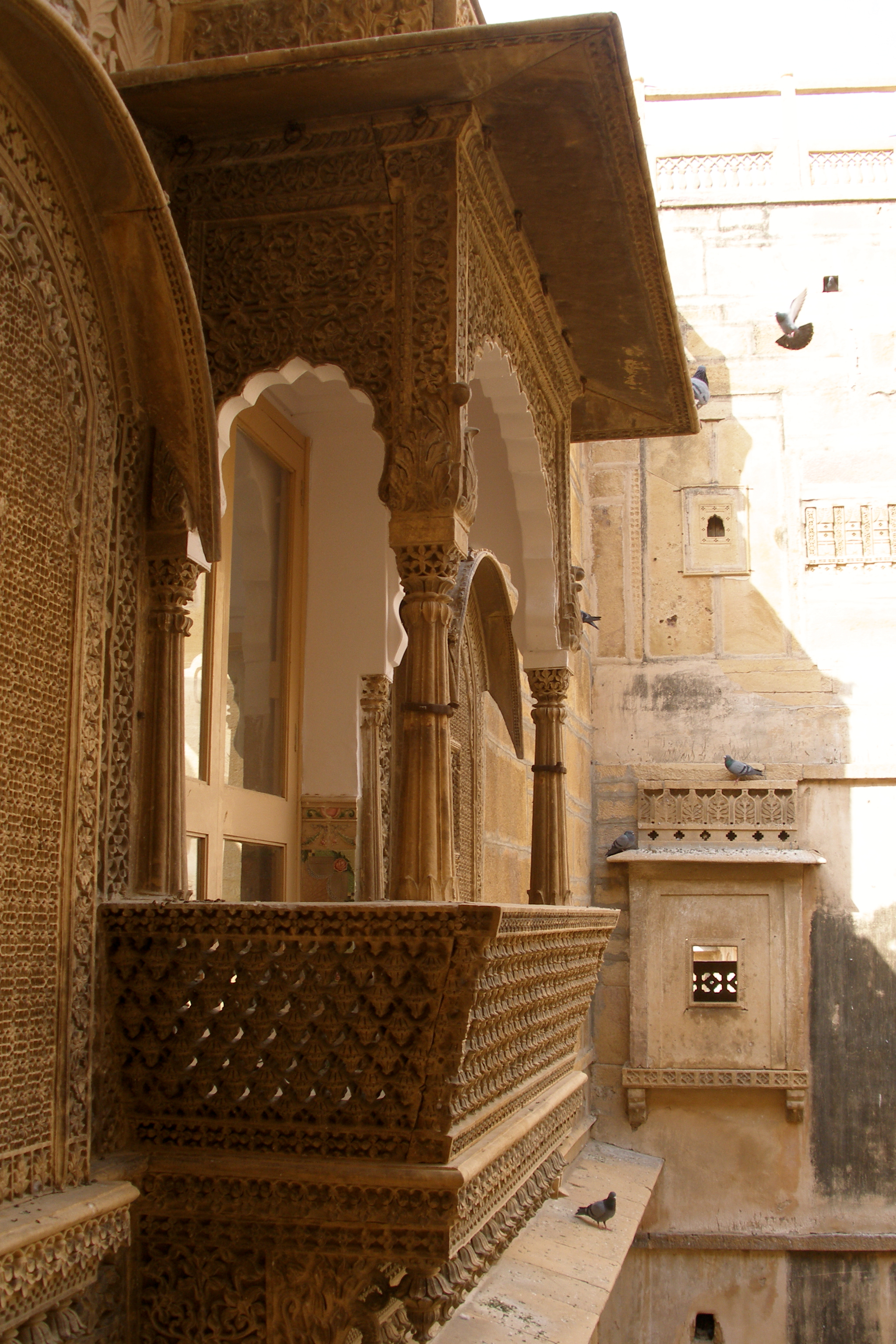
- Haveli in the Jaisalmer fort
  Numerous Merchant Havelis. These are large houses often built by wealthy merchants in Rajasthani towns and cities in North India, with ornate sandstone carvings. Some havelis are many hundreds of years old. In Jaisalmer there are many elaborate havelis carved from yellow sandstone. Some of these have many floors and countless rooms, with decorated windows, archways, doors and balconies. Some havelis are today museums but most in Jaisalmer are still lived in by the families that built them. Among these is the Vyas haveli which was built in the 15th century, which is still occupied by the descendants of the original builders. Another example is the Shree Nath Palace which was once inhabited by the prime minister of Jaisalmer. Some of the doors and ceilings are notable examples of old carved wood from many hundreds of years ago.
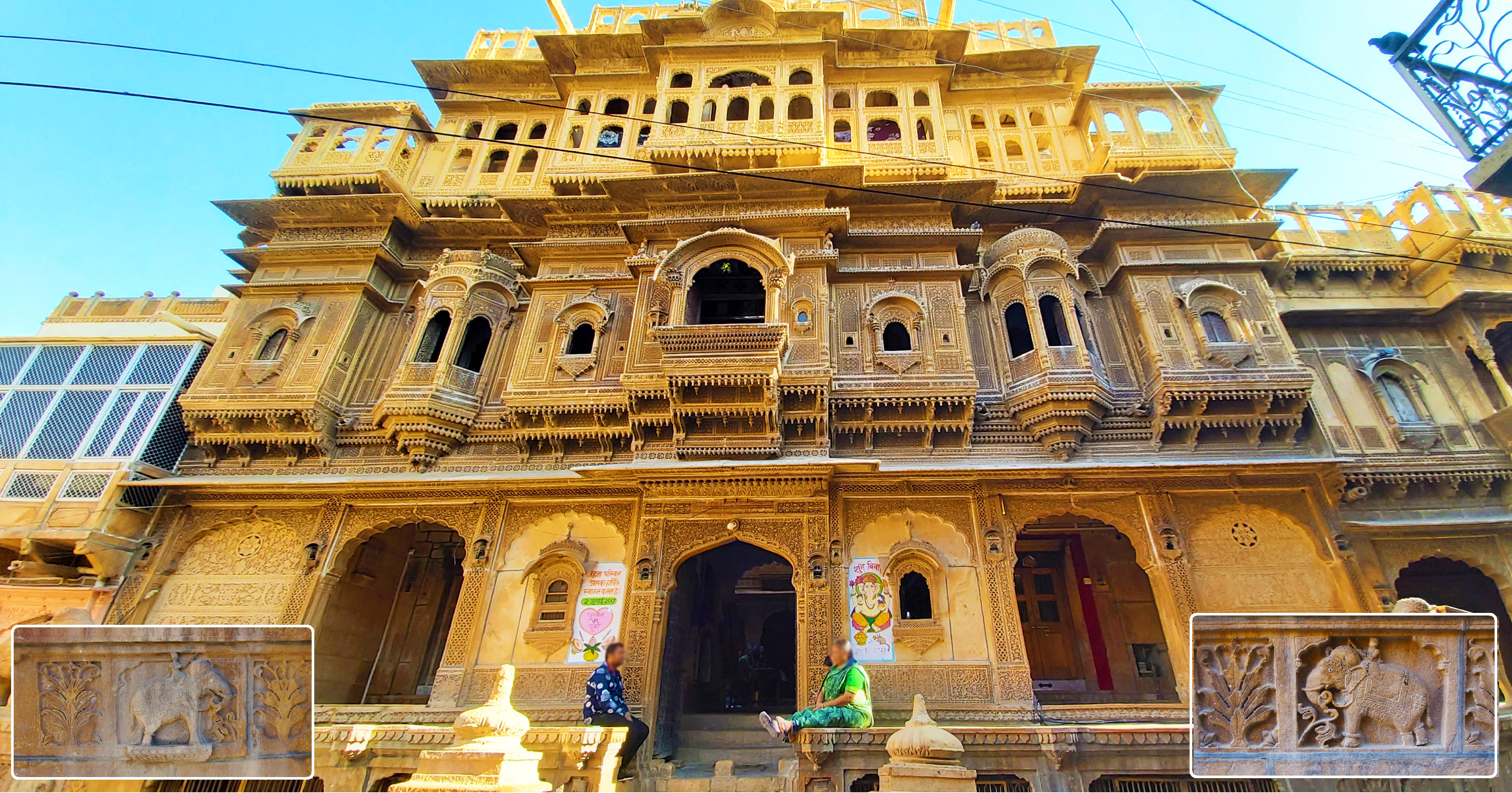
- Nathmal Haveli with signature seals of architects
  Nathmal Haveli is an iconic monument of Jaisalmer fort. It is built of yellow sandstone that appears golden in sunlight. The haveli is named after Nathmal, the then prime minister at the court of Jaisalmer. It was built by two brothers Lulu and Hathi, simultaneously, from different segments. For this reason, the building has no symmetry, yet it is an excellent piece of art, and ornate architecture. These architects left their signature at the plinth of the building as a carving of a Rajputana warrior on elephant. The building is characteristically identified with two elephants on either side. The building is a mix of Islamic and Rajputana style of architecture.

The fort has an ingenious drainage system called the ghut nali which allows for the easy drainage of rainwater away from the fort in all four directions of the fort. Over the years, haphazard construction activities and building of new roads has greatly reduced its effectiveness.

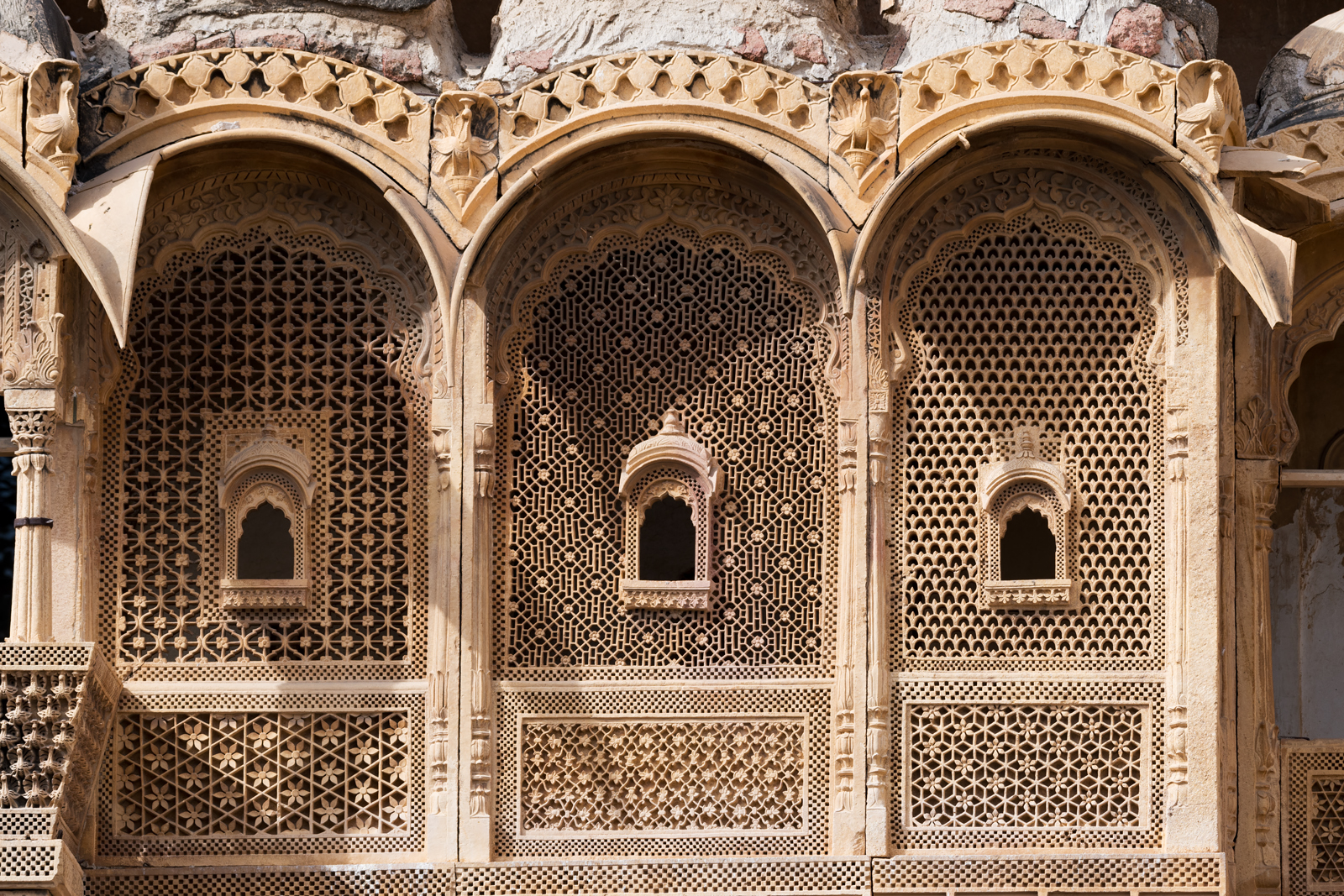
Jharokhas in Jaisalmer Fort

== Culture ==
The fort has numerous eateries, including Italian, French and native cuisines. The famous Indian film director Satyajit Ray wrote the Sonar Kella (The Golden Fortress), a detective novel, based on the fort and he later filmed it here. The film became a classic and a large number of tourists from Bengal and around the world visit the fort annually to experience for themselves the world that Ray portrayed in the movie. Six forts of Rajasthan, namely, Amber Fort, Chittor Fort, Gagron Fort, Jaisalmer Fort, Kumbhalgarh and Ranthambore Fort were included in the UNESCO World Heritage Site list during the 37th meeting of the World Heritage Committee in Phnom Penh during June 2013. They were recognized as a serial cultural property and examples of Rajput military hill architecture.

== Restoration ==
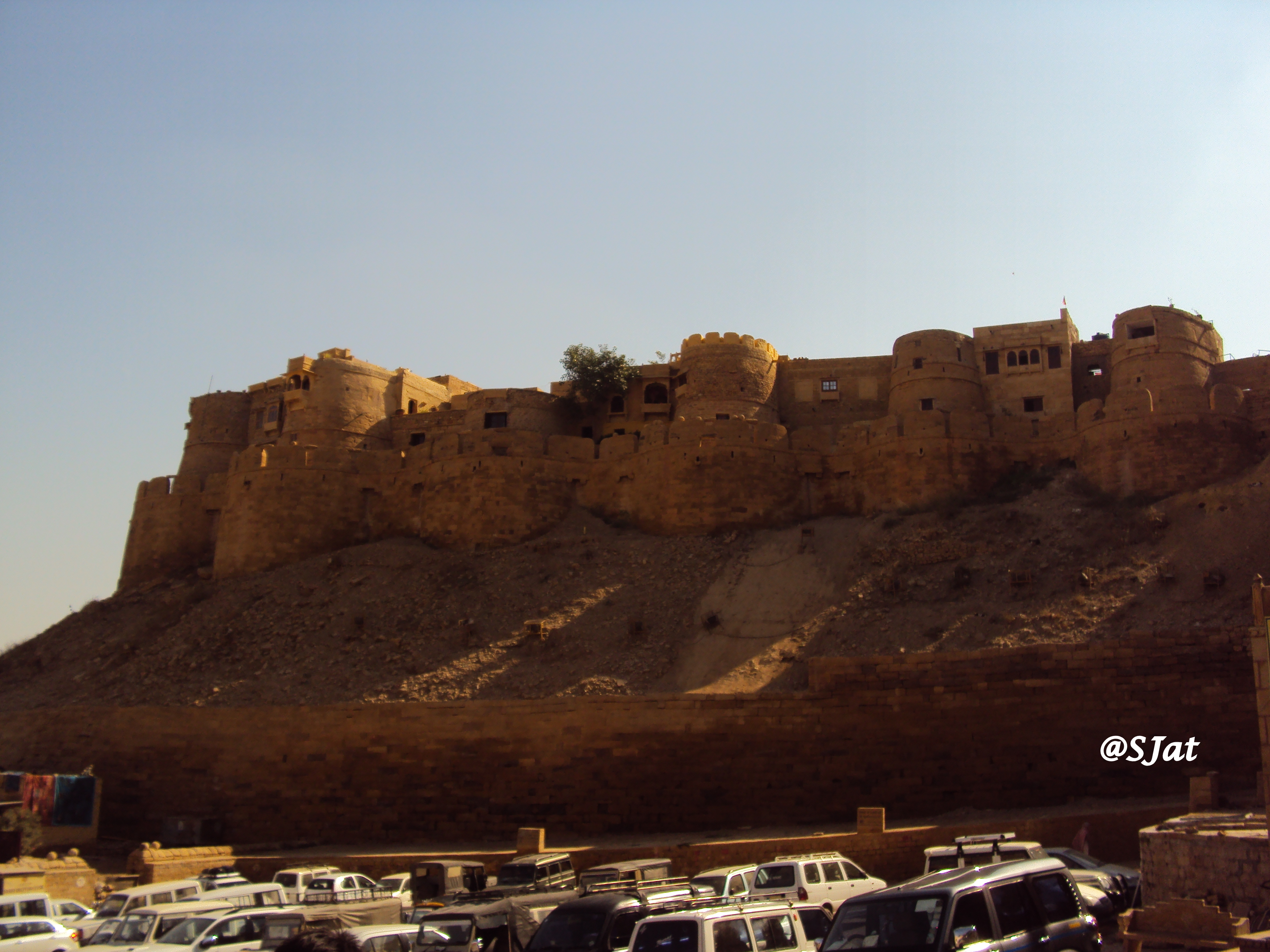
Jaisalmer Fort (from Sonargadh)

The Jaisalmer Fort today faces manifold threats that are a result of the increasing population pressure on it. Water seepage, inadequate civic amenities, derelict houses and seismic activity around the Trikuta Hill are some of the major concerns impacting the fort. Unlike most other forts, the Jaisalmer Fort has been built over a weak sedimentary rock foothill which makes its foundations especially vulnerable to seepage. Over the years this has led to the collapse of significant portions of the fort such as the Queen's Palace or Rani Ka Mahal and parts of the outer boundary wall and the lower pitching walls.

The World Monuments Fund included the fort in its 1996 World Monuments Watch and again in the 1998 and 2000 reports due to the threats posed to it by an increase in its resident population and the increasing numbers of tourists who visit it every year. The fort is one of Rajasthan's most popular tourist attractions with as many as five to six hundred thousand tourists visiting it annually. As a result, it is abuzz with commercial activities and has seen a phenomenal growth in both human and vehicular traffic.

Major restoration work has been undertaken by the World Monuments Fund and UK based charity Jaisalmer in Jeopardy. According to former INTACH chairman S.K. Misra, American Express has provided more than $1 million for the conservation of Jaisalmer Fort. The absence of coordinated action among the various government departments responsible for civic amenities, the local municipality and the Archaeological Survey that is responsible for the upkeep of the fort is a major impediment in its maintenance and restoration.

== Gallery ==
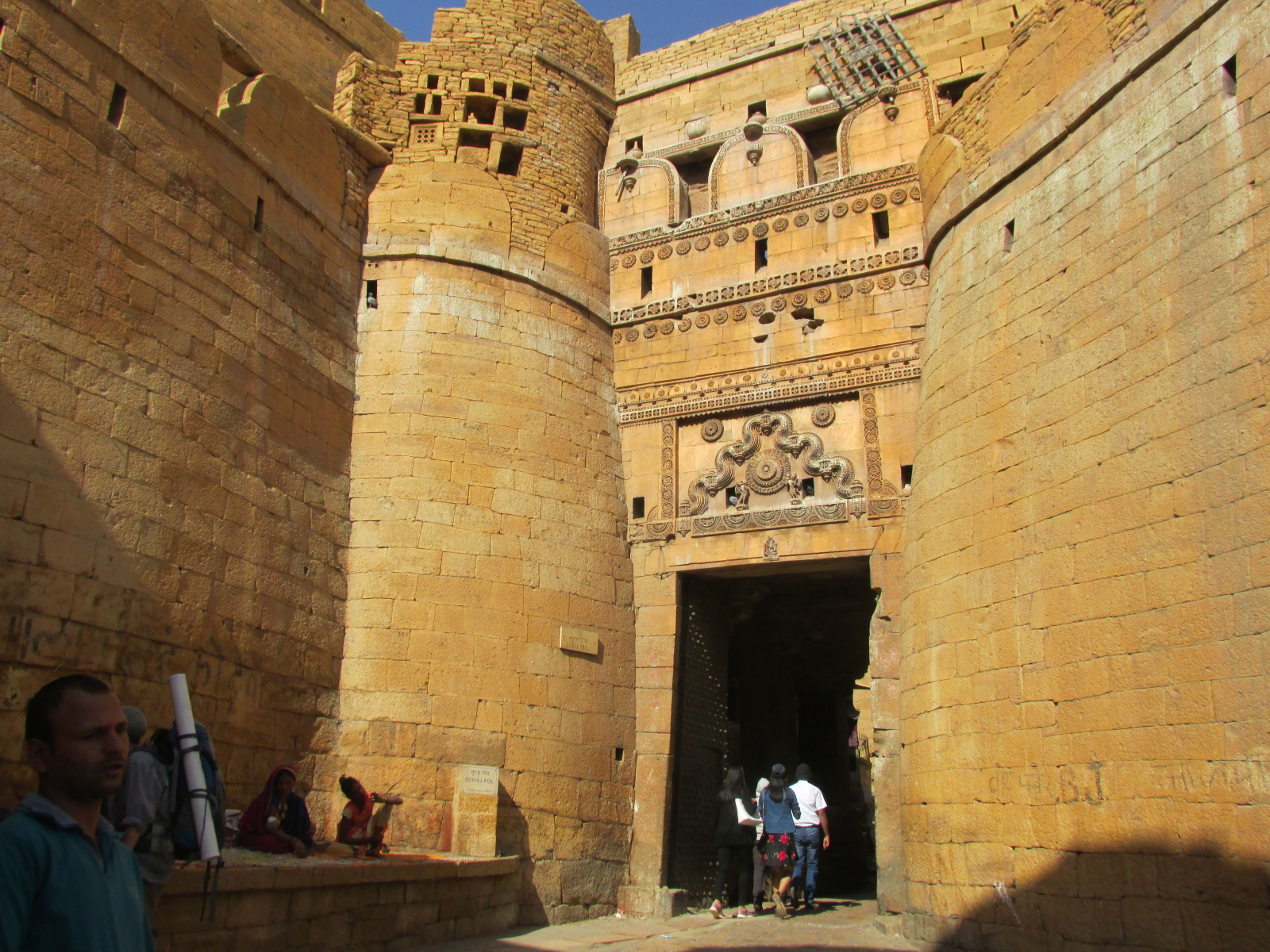
Fort entrance

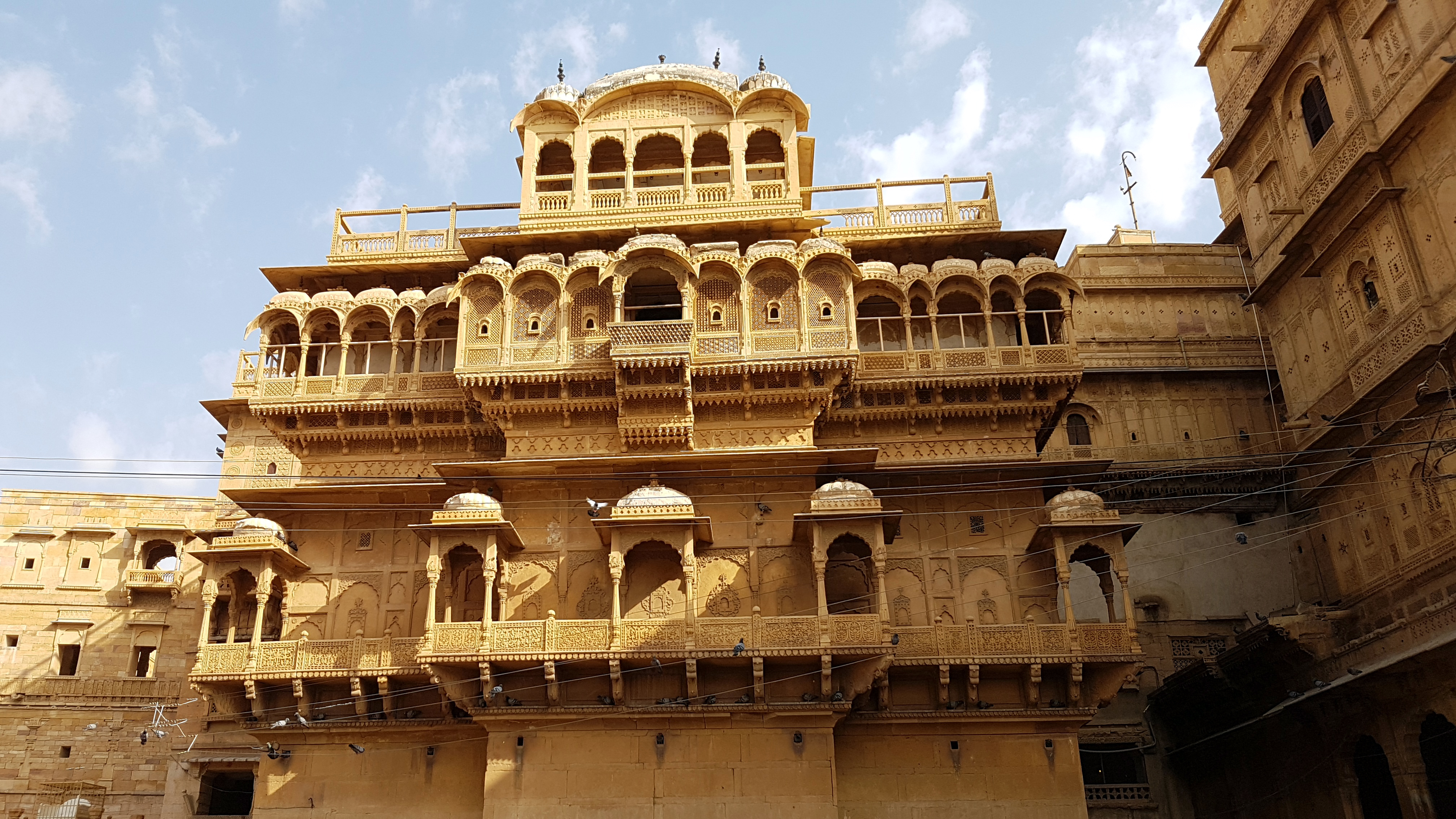
Palace in the fort

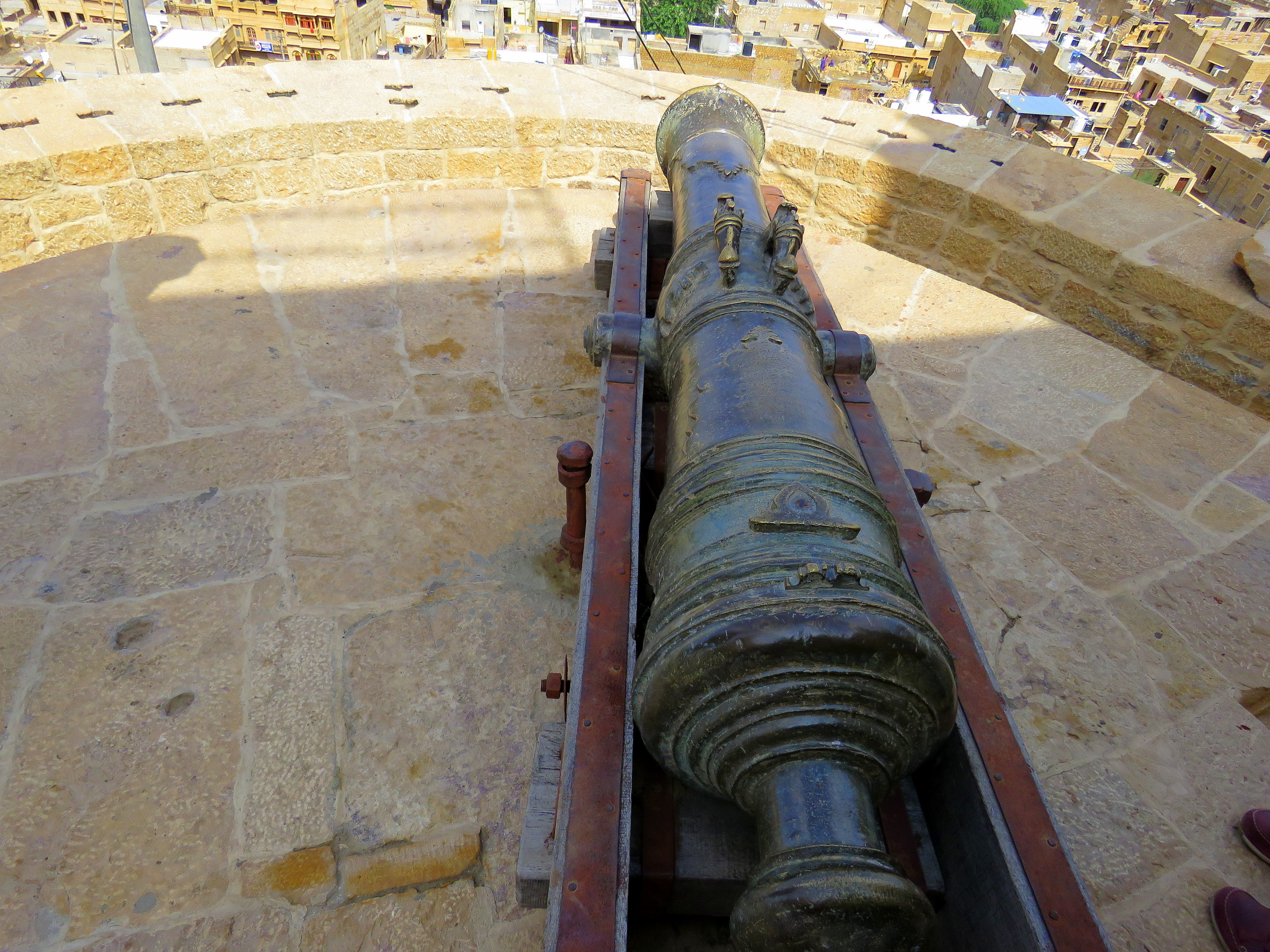
Cannon at Jaisalmer Fort

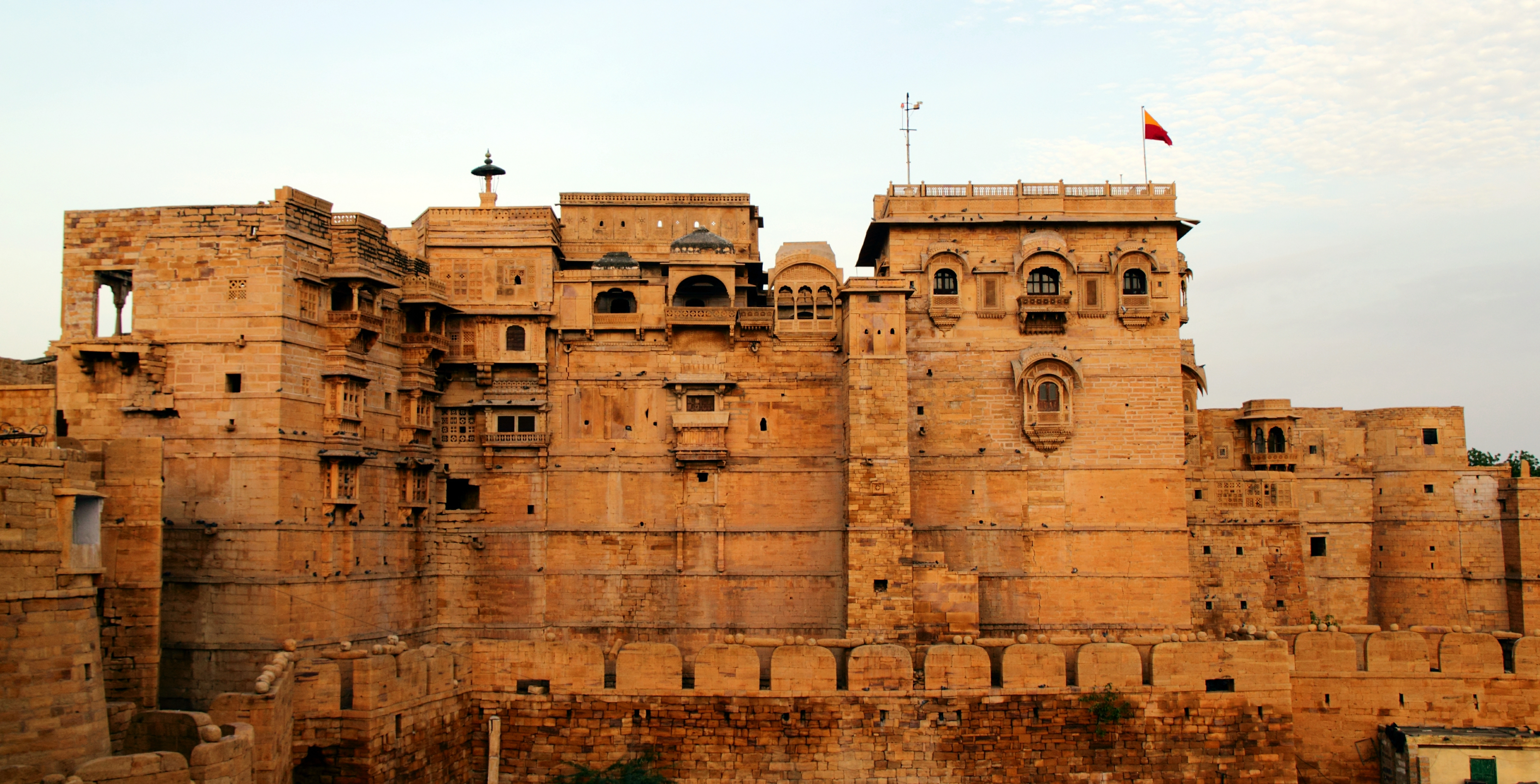
Fort Palace - Jaisalmer Fort

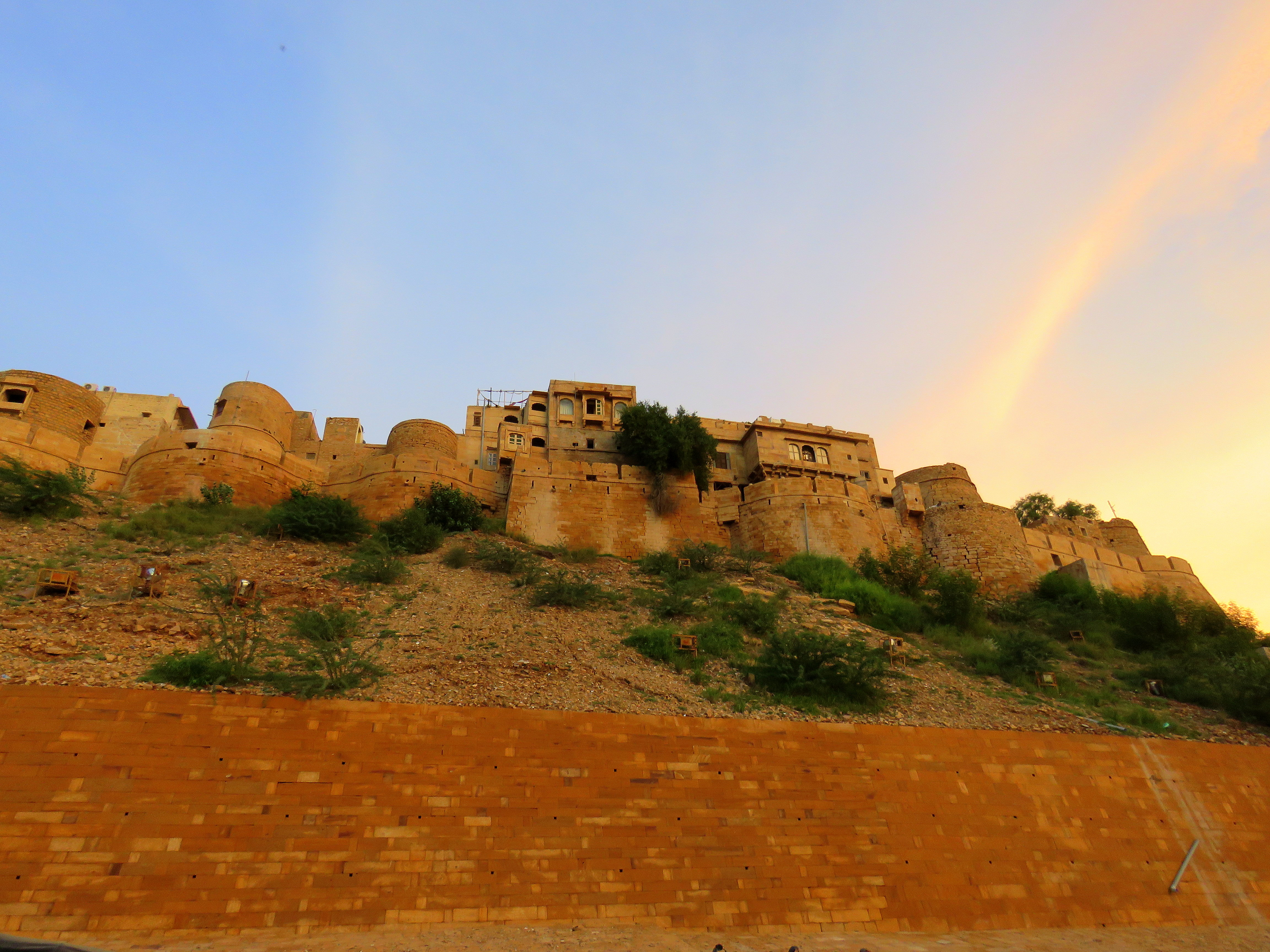
Evening view of Jaisalmer Fort

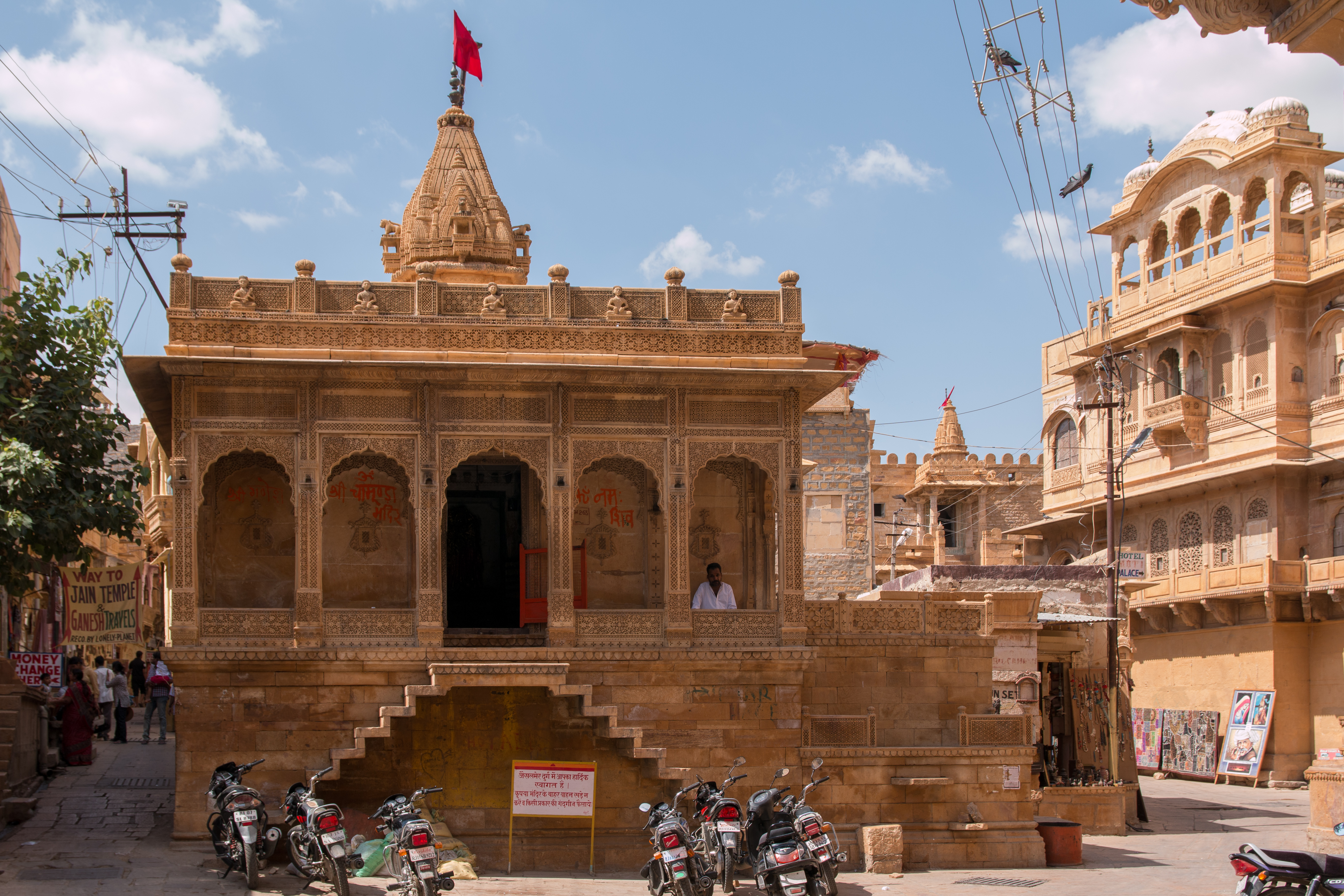
Maa chamunda temple inside fort

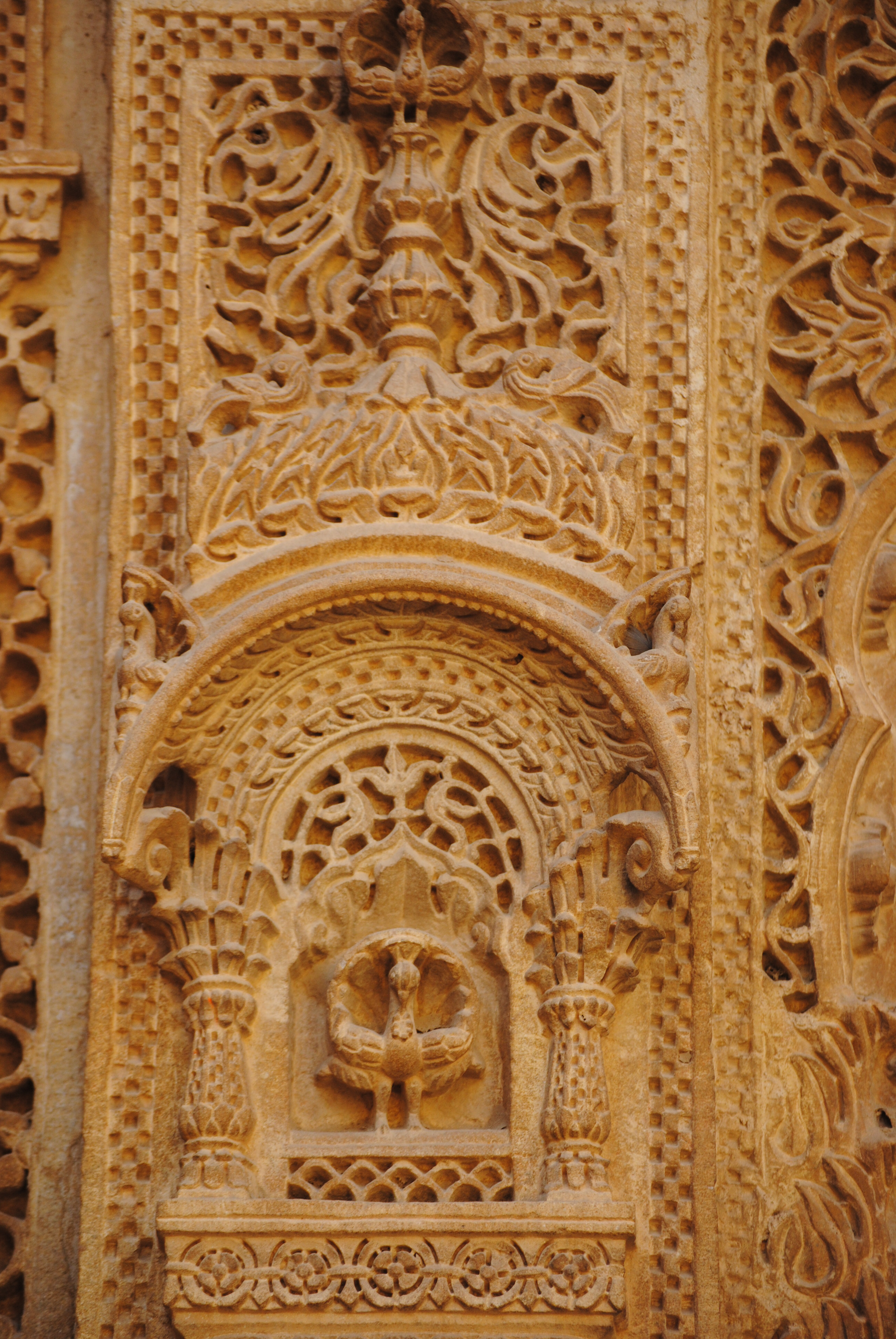
Carvings in the fort

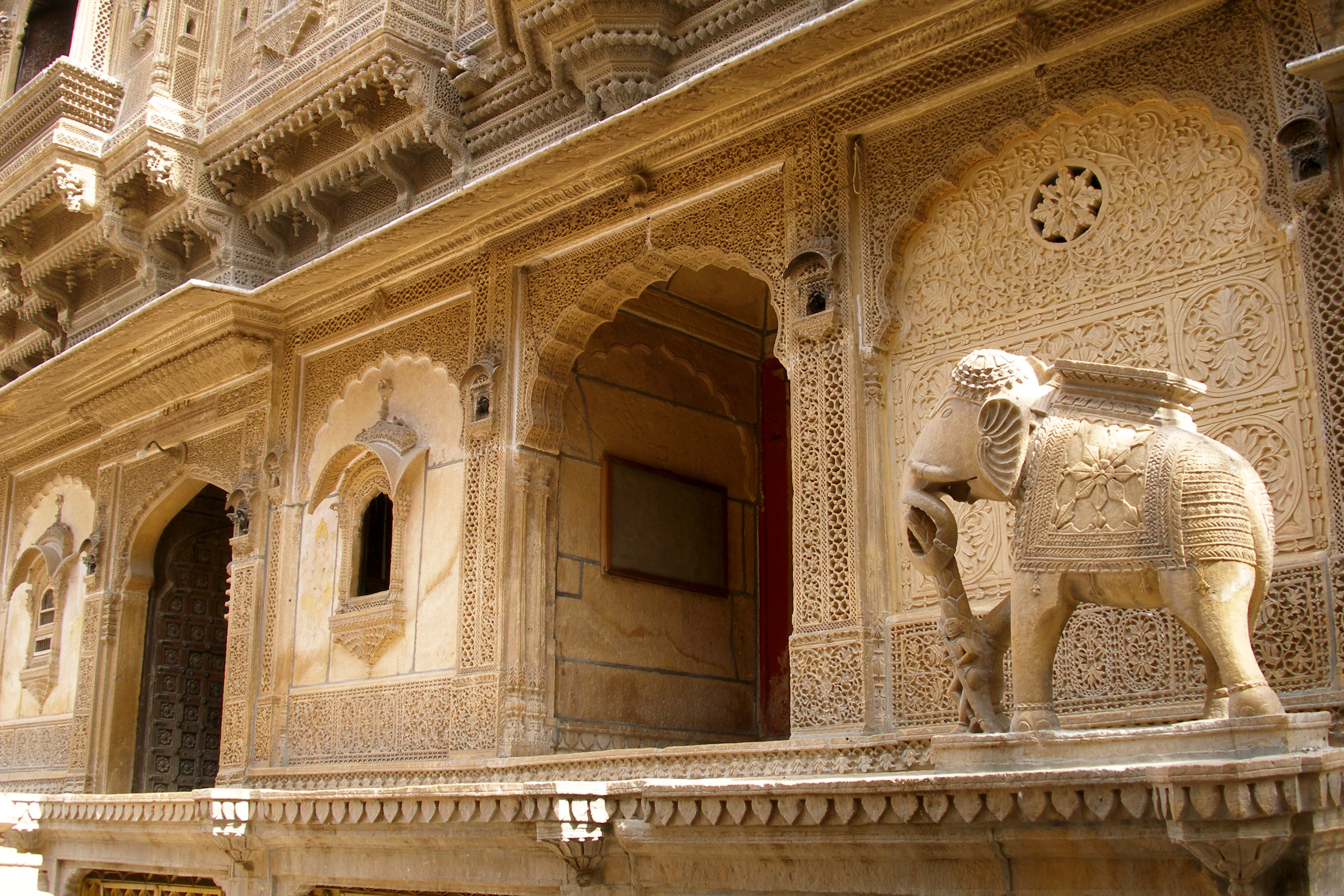
Haveli art

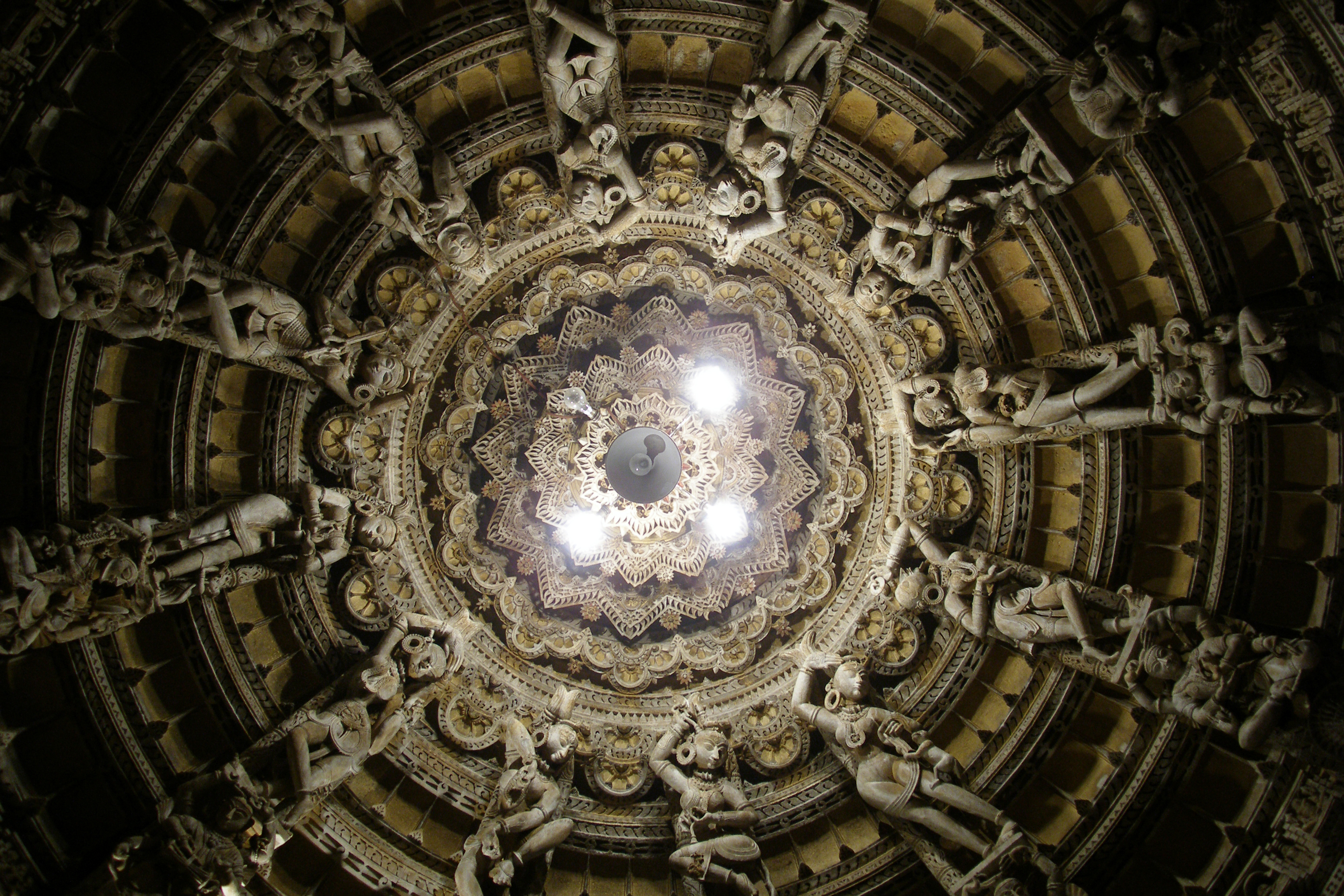
Jain temple ceiling inside jaisalmer fort

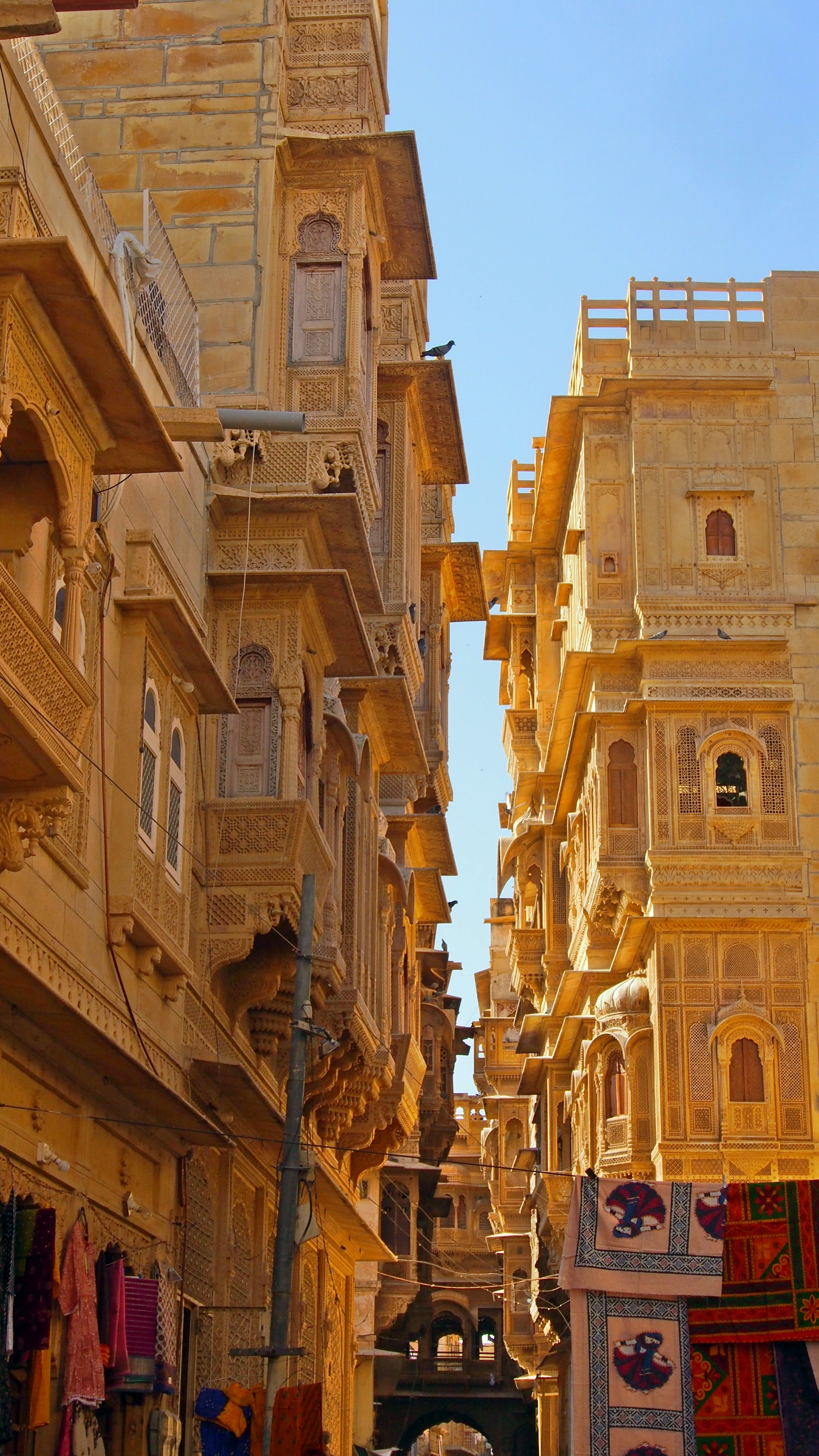
Narrow alleys of Jaisalmer fort. Intricate designs in Yellow sandstone

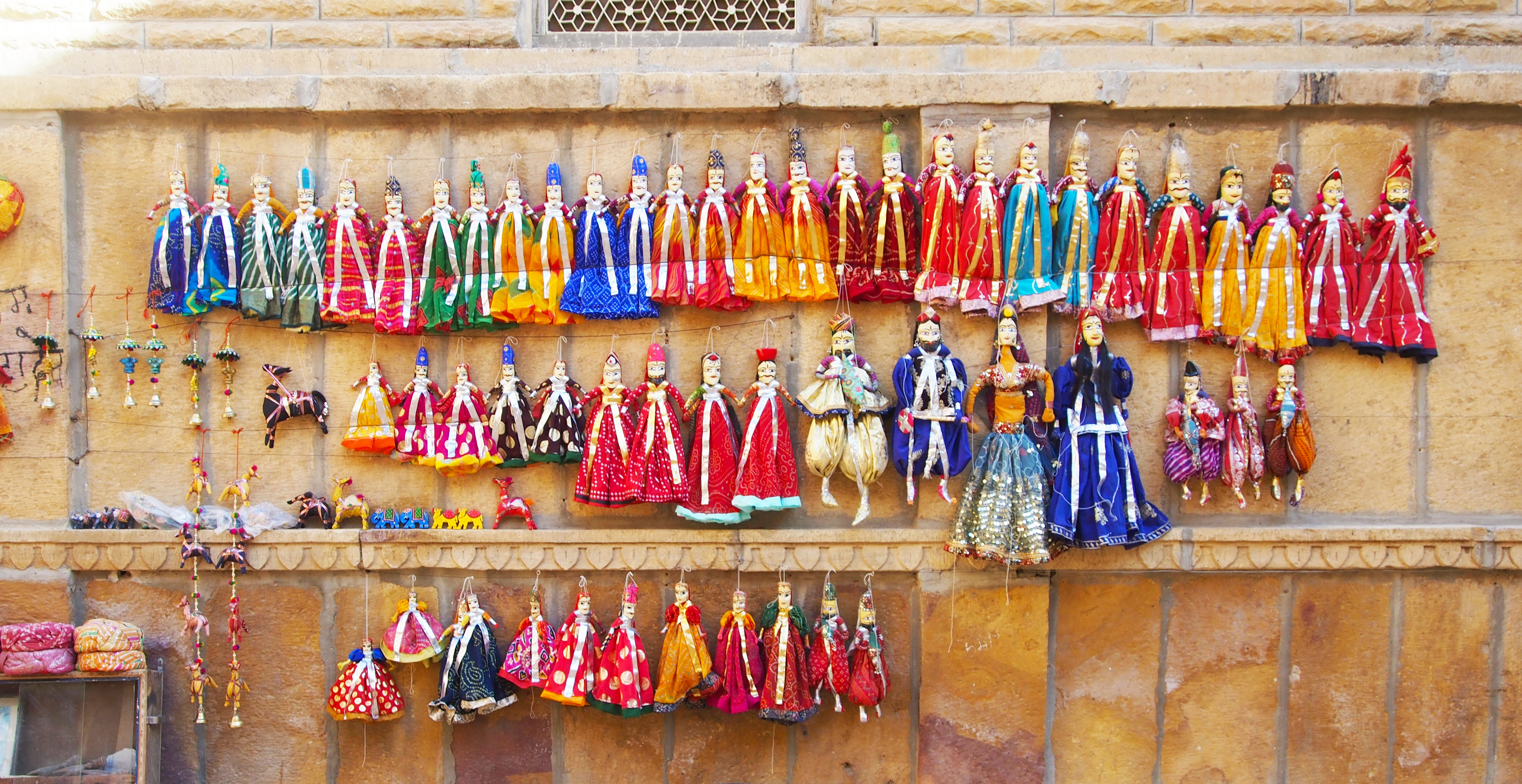
Puppets on sale in the narrow alleys of Jaisalmer Fort

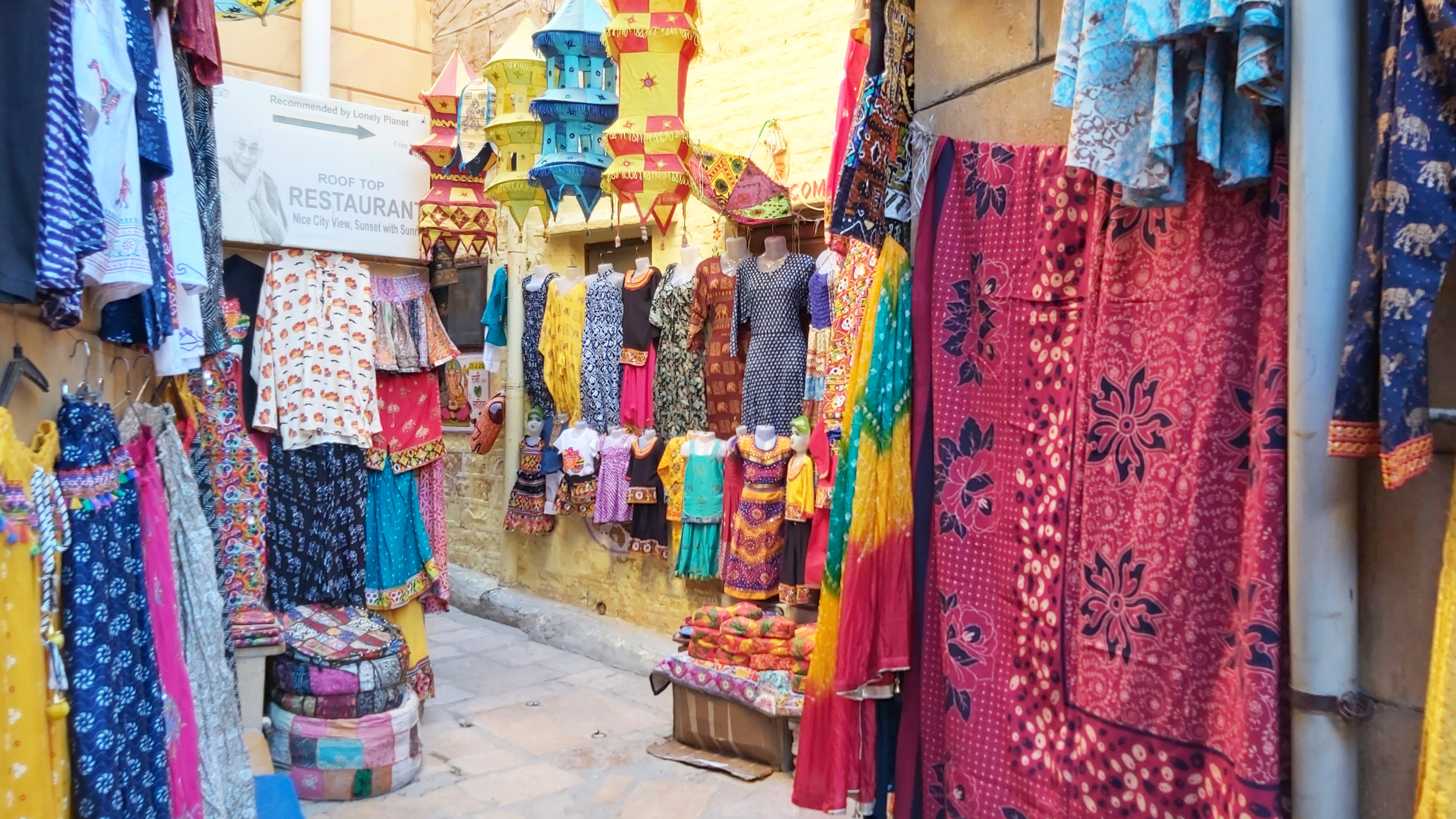
Street Market inside Jaisalmer Fort

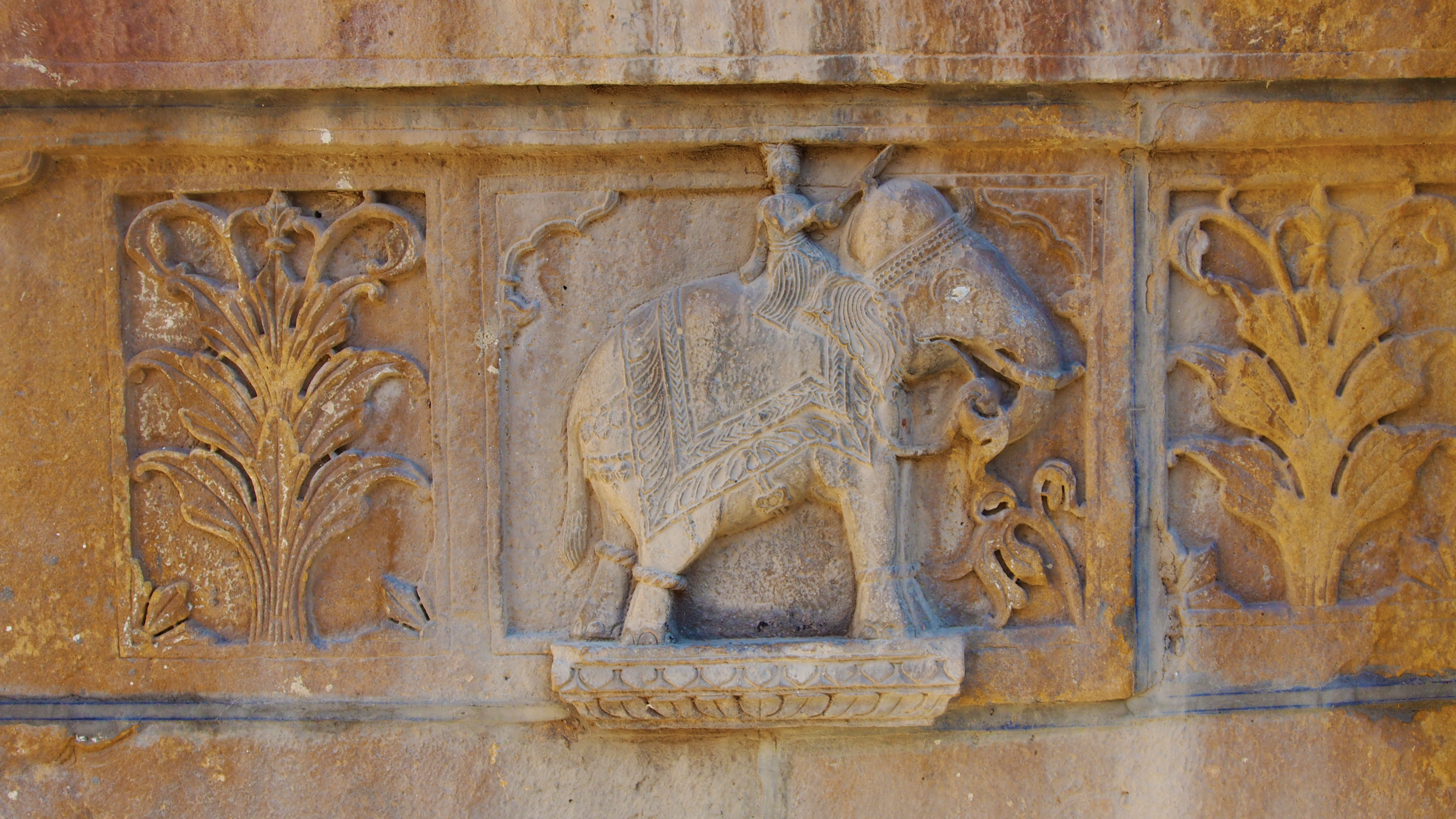
NathmalJi Haveli Elephant carving high relief

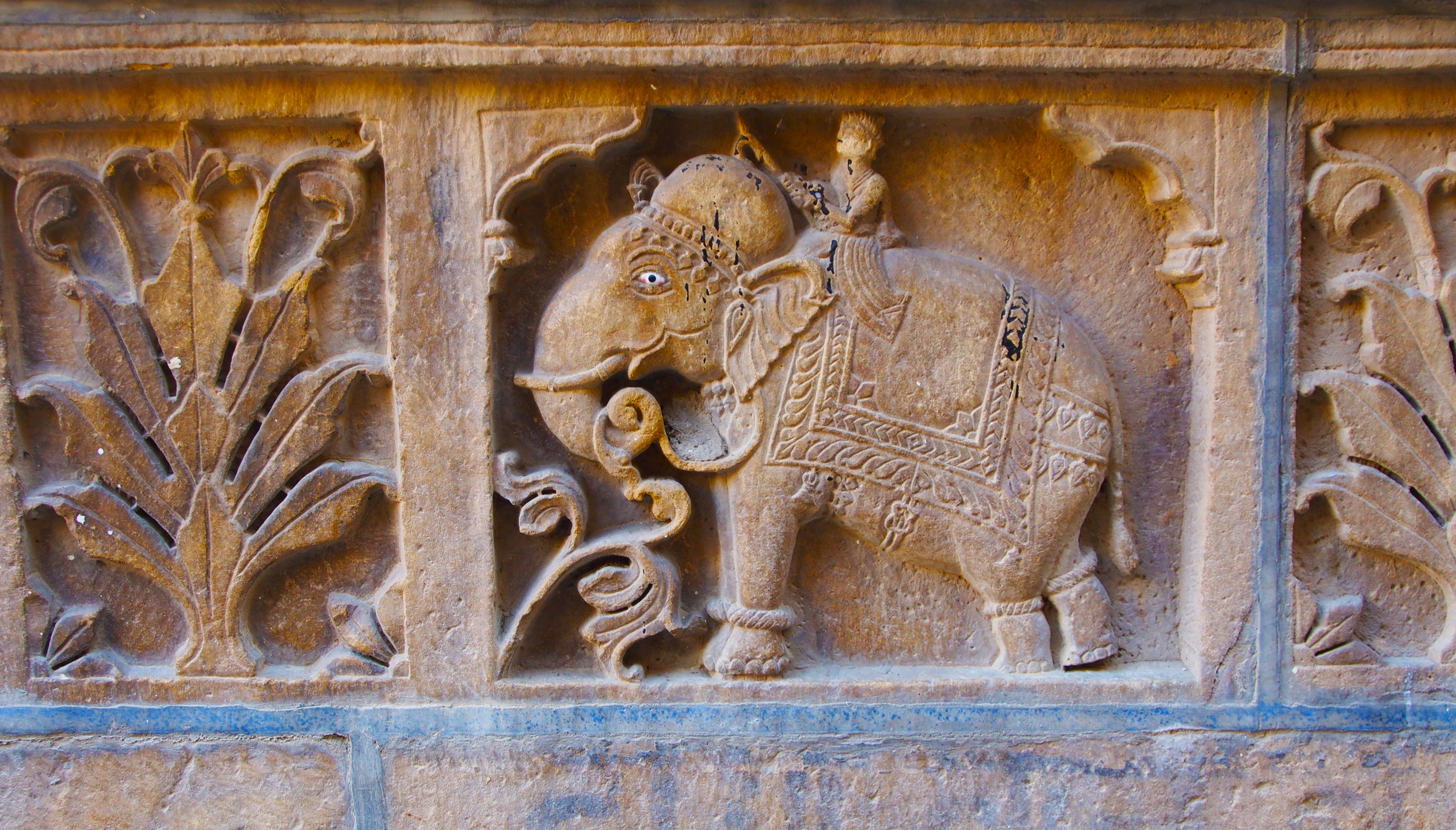
Nathmalji Haveli Elephant carvings in low relief

== See also ==
- Rajput architecture
- Hill Forts of Rajasthan

== Sources ==
- Melton, J. Gordon (2014), Faiths Across Time: 5,000 Years of Religious History [4 Volumes], ABC-CLIO, ISBN 9781610690263
- Jain, Chanchalmal Lodha, History of Oswals, Panchshil Publications, ISBN 9788192373027
