= Kadamba (1983 film) =

- Directed by: P. N. Menon
- Written by: Kamal; P. N. Menon (dialogues)
- Screenplay by: P. N. Menon
- Produced by: P. V. George
- Starring: Prakash; Jayanthi; Sathaar; Achankunju; Jayamala
- Cinematography: Devi Prasad
- Edited by: Sasikumar
- Music by: K. Raghavan
- Production company: Prarthana Films
- Distributed by: Prarthana Films
- Release date: 1 April 1983
- Country: India
- Language: Malayalam

Kadamba is a 1983 film, directed by P. N. Menon and produced by P. V. George. The film stars Prakash, Jayanthi, Sathaar and Achankunju in the lead roles. The film has musical score by K. Raghavan.

== Plot ==
Janu is brought up by her father after the sudden death of her mother. Problems start brewing in her life when her father searches for a perfect groom, unaware that she is in love with someone else.

== Cast ==
- Jayanthi as Janu
- Prakash
- Achankunju as Velu, janu's father
- Balan K. Nair as Keshavan
- Sathaar as Kunjiraman
- Bhaskara Kuruppu

== Soundtrack ==
The music was composed by K. Raghavan and the lyrics were written by Bichu Thirumala and Thikkodiyan.

No.	Song	Singers	Lyrics	Length (m:ss)
1	"Aandi Vannaandi Vannu"	S. Janaki	Bichu Thirumala	
2	"Appolum Paranjille"	K. Raghavan, Chorus, C. O. Anto	Thikkodiyan	
3	"Pichakappoonkaattil"	K. J. Yesudas	Bichu Thirumala	
