= Nrithasala =

- Directed by: A. B. Raj
- Written by: Thikkodiyan; S. L. Puram Sadanandan (dialogues)
- Screenplay by: S. L. Puram Sadanandan
- Produced by: Sobhana Parameswaran Nair
- Starring: Prem Nazir; Jayabharathi; Innocent; Adoor Bhasi
- Cinematography: P. Dathu; Balu Mahendra (one song)
- Edited by: V. P. Krishnan
- Music by: V. Dakshinamoorthy
- Production company: Roopavani Films
- Distributed by: Roopavani Films
- Release date: 9 September 1972
- Country: India
- Language: Malayalam

Nrithasala is a 1972 Indian Malayalam-language film directed by A. B. Raj and produced by Sobhana Parameswaran Nair. The film stars Prem Nazir, Jayabharathi, Innocent and Adoor Bhasi in the lead roles. V. Dakshinamoorthy composed the musical score. It was the debut film of actors Innocent and Sumithra.

== Cast ==
- Prem Nazir Magician Prof. Rajendran
- Jayabharathi as Priyamvadha
- Innocent as News Reporter
- Adoor Bhasi as Pachu Pilla
- Jose Prakash as Dhayanandhan
- Prema
- Sankaradi as Shekara Panikkar
- Raghavan
- T. S. Muthaiah as Govindha Panikkar
- Abbas
- G. K. Pillai as Vamban Velayudhan
- Jayakumari
- K. P. Ummer as Jayadevan
- Kanakadurga
- Kavitha
- Mathew Plathottam
- Pala Thankam
- Radhamani
- Seema as Magician's Assistant
- Sumithra
- Jayshree T.

== Soundtrack ==
The music was composed by V. Dakshinamoorthy with lyrics by Sreekumaran Thampi and P. Bhaskaran.

No.	Song	Singers	Lyrics	Length (m:ss)
1	"Chirichathu Chilankayalla"	L. R. Eeswari	Sreekumaran Thampi	
2	"Devavaahini"	K. J. Yesudas	Sreekumaran Thampi	
3	"Madanaraajan Vannu"	B. Vasantha	Sreekumaran Thampi	
4	"Manjaninja Madhumaasa"	S. Janaki	P. Bhaskaran	
5	"Ponveyil"	K. J. Yesudas	Sreekumaran Thampi	
6	"Sooryabimbam"	P. Jayachandran	Sreekumaran Thampi	
7	"Udayasooryan"	K. P. Brahmanandan	P. Bhaskaran	
