= Hitlist (2009 film) =

- Directed by: Sandip Ray
- Written by: Sandip Ray
- Screenplay by: [Sandip Ray
- Produced by: Mou Roychowdhury
- Cinematography: Sasanko Palit
- Edited by: Subrata Roy
- Music by: Sandip Ray
- Release date: 2009
- Country: India
- Language: Bengali
- Box office: 25 lakh

Hitlist is a 2009 Indian Bengali-language vigilante action thriller film written and directed by Sandip Ray and production by Mou Roychowdhury. The film stars Koel Mallick, Saheb Chatterjee, Dhritiman Chatterjee and Tota Roy Chowdhury in the lead roles. The film was released on 2009.

== Cast ==
=== Lead role ===
- Dhritiman Chatterjee
- Tota Roy Chowdhury
- Sudipta Chakraborty
- Saheb Chatterjee
- Saswata Chatterjee
- Subhrajit Dutta
- Siddhartha Chatterjee
- Koel Mallick

=== Guest appearance ===
- Dipankar De
- Mithu Chakrabarty

=== Special appearance ===
- Tinnu Anand
- Babul Supriyo
