= Ithiri Poove Chuvannapoove =

- Poster designed by Bharathan
- Directed by: Bharathan
- Written by: Thikkodiyan
- Screenplay by: John Paul Puthusery
- Produced by: P. V. Gangadharan
- Starring: Madhu; Mammootty; Rahman; K R Vijaya; Bhagyasri; Shobana
- Music by: Raveendran
- Release date: 20 July 1984
- Country: India
- Language: Malayalam

Ithiri Poove Chuvannapoove is a 1984 Indian Malayalam-language film, directed by Bharathan, with story written by Thikkodiyan and produced by P. V. Gangadharan. The film stars Madhu, Mammootty, Rahman, K R Vijaya, Suresh and Shobana. The film has musical score by Ravindran.

== Plot ==
Balagopalan is Unni's elder brother. Unni is a youth with friends from college. Theirs is a happy family. Balagopalan is a cop and Unni, from influences, becomes a naxalite. The story follows the dynamics of this relationship and also that of Unni's with his girlfriend.

== Cast ==
- Madhu as Unni's Father
- Mammootty as Balagopalan
- Rahman as Unni or Unnikrishnan
- K. R. Vijaya as Meenakshi
- Bhagyasri
- Suresh as Ravi
- Shobana as Subhadra
- Nedumudi Venu as Potty Mannam
- Lalithasree as Ammukutty

== Songs ==
Lyrics by Kavalam Narayana Panikkar. O.N.V. Kurup

- "Omanathinkal Kidavo" - S. Janaki
- "Ponpularoli Poovithariya" - K. J. Yesudas, Lathika
- "Oru Theruvunaadaka Gaanam" - K. P. Brahmanandan, Bharathan, Raveendran
