= Amar Aponjon =

2017 film by Raja Chanda

Amar Apanjon
- Amar Aponjon Movie Poster
- Directed by: Raja Chanda
- Written by: Raja Chanda (Dialogues)
- Screenplay by: Raja Chanda
- Story by: Cheran
- Produced by: Soham Chakraborty; Actor Studio
- Starring: Soham; Subhashree; Aindrita; Priyanka Sarkar; Mimi Chakraborty; Siddartha Chatterjee
- Cinematography: Shirsha Roy
- Edited by: Anindyo Chatterjee
- Music by: Dabbu; Dolon-Mainak
- Production companies: Ajosro Entertainment; Sunday Films; Actor Studio
- Distributed by: Shree Venkatesh Films
- Release date: 26 May 2017
- Country: India
- Language: Bengali
- Budget: ₹12.0 million
- Box office: est. ₹30 million

Amar Aponjon (transl. My Own People) is a 2017 romantic drama film directed by Raja Chanda. The movie is a remake of the Tamil language film Autograph. The film stars Soham with Priyanka Sarkar as his school-life crush, Aindrita as his college-life lover, and Subhashree as his emotional anchor in professional life. This was Soham's debut film as producer.

== Cast ==
- Soham as Joydip
- Subhashree as Shree
- Aindrita as Sayoni
- Priyanka Sarkar as Priya
- Mimi Chakraborty as Mou
- Siddartha Chatterjee
- Kharaj Mukherjee
- Subhadra Mukherjee as Joydip's mother
- Shantilal Mukherjee as Joydip's father

== Production ==
Principal photography of the film started on 15 December 2016 in Kalimpong, Kolkata and Birbhum. Revealing a bit about the film's plot, the director said, "It's about how a guy (Soham), who gets ditched in love, turns his life around by surrounding himself with positive people. He's associated with three women in the film, but how, I can't reveal that now," he said. Soham also debuted as a producer with this film, jointly producing the film with actor studio owned by Abhishake de sarkar and Ravi Keswani, under Ajosro Entertainment.

== Soundtrack ==
Amar Aponjon

Soundtrack album by Dabbu and Dolon Mainak
- Released: 2017
- Recorded: 2017
- Genre: Feature film soundtrack
- Language: Bengali
- Label: SVF Music
- Producer: Soham Chakraborty

Dabbu and Dolon Mainak chronology
| Dhat Teri Ki (2017) | Amar Aponjon (2017) | Network (2017) |

Dabbu and Dolon Mainak composed the music of the film, with lyrics by Prasen and Raja Chanda.

| No. | Title | Writer(s) | Singer(s) | Length |
|---|---|---|---|---|
| 1. | "Ele Chupi Chupi" | Prosen | Armaan Malik, Antara Mitra |
| 2. | "Esho Amar Nodir Tire" | Prosen | Shaan, Antara Mirta |
| 3. | "Chol Khunji" | Raja Chanda | Nachiketa Chakraborty |
| 4. | "Amar Ja Kichu Kotha" | Raja Chanda | Anweshaa |
| Total length: | | | | 15:40 |
