= Pattathuvila Karunakaran =

Indian writer and film producer (1925–1987)

- Born: 7 July 1925
- Died: 6 May 1987 (aged 61)
- Occupations: Story writer, film producer
- Spouse: Saraswathy
- Children: Two daughters
- Relatives: Kochukunju (father); Kochukunjali (mother)
- Writing career
- Notable works: Vimarsham; Muni
- Notable awards: Kerala Sahitya Akademi Award for Story

Pattathuvila Karunakaran (1925–1987) was an Indian film producer and short story writer of Malayalam literature. He was best known for his book, Vimarsham and for his association with the film, Uttarayanam, the directorial debut of noted filmmaker, G. Aravindan, as the film's producer and story writer. Kerala Sahitya Akademi awarded him their annual award for story in 1972.

== Biography ==
Karunakaran was born on 7 July 1925 in Pattathuvila family in Quilon district of the south Indian state of Kerala to Kochukunju and Kochukunjali. After schooling at Craven School, Quilon and subsequent graduation from Presidency College Madras, he joined the Government Law College, Thiruvananthapuram but did not complete the course. He started his career as a journalist with Kerala Kaumudi, but soon quit the job to pursue studies in business administration at Syracuse University in the US from where he earned a master's degree in business administration. On his return to Kerala, he joined the Calicut branch of Pierse Leslie India Ltd. as a manager and settled down in Kozhikode, where he spent the rest of his life as a part of the celebrated Kozhikode Cultural Circle, which included such noted writers and artists like Vaikom Muhammed Basheer, M.T.Vasudevan Nair, Thikkodiyan, V. K. N., G. Aravindan, N. P. Mohammed and M. V. Devan.

Karunakaran was married to Saraswathi, fondly called Sara, the marriage taking place in 1955 and the couple had two daughters, Anitha and Anuradha. He died on 6 May 1987, at the age of 61.

== Legacy and honours ==
Karaunakaran was known to have been a private person, seldom appearing in public forums and wrote only short stories while many of his contemporaries turned to writing novels. In 1973, his short story anthology, Muni, was selected for the Kerala Sahitya Akademi Award for Story. He published a number of short story anthologies, including Vimarsham, Bourgeois Snehithan and Nattellikalude Jeevitham and his stories portrayed personal identity crisis, reflecting the recurring themes of betrayal and sacrifice, seen from a cynical perspective. His stories have also been translated into English.

Karaunakaran could not fulfill his early desire to study film-making, he was a part of the group which made Uttarayanam, the 1974 film made by G. Aravindan in the capacity of the producer. The film went on to receive a number of awards such as the Kerala State Film Award for Best Film and the National Film Award for Best Feature Film in Malayalam. He was also a member of the Aswini Film Society, a Kozhikode-based sister organization of Chitralekha Film Society of Adoor Gopalakrishnan, where M. T. Vasudevan Nair and G. Aravindan were also members.

Pattathuvila Karunakaran Memorial Trust, an eponymous organization, has instituted an award, Pattathuvila Karunakaran Memorial Award, to recognise the excellence in literature and Prabha Varma and Perumal Murugan have been among the recipients.

== Bibliography ==
- Pattathuvila Karunakaran (1972). Muni. Kottayam: N.B.S.
- Pattathuvila Karunakaran. Bourgeois Snehithan.
- Karunakaran Pattathuvila (1957). Kanne madaguaka. Current Books.
- Pattathuvila Karunakaran. Bali.
- Pattathuvila Karunakaran. Sathyanweshanam.
- Pattathuvila Karunakaran. Kadha-Pattathuvila.
- Karunakaran, Pattathuvila; Author (1999). Pattathuvilayude kathakal. Kottayam, D C Books. ISBN 9788171309719.
- Karunakaran, Pattathuvila (1981). Nattellikalude jeevitham. Kottayam: National Book Stall.
- Karunakaran, Pattathuvila (2003). Vimarsam. Kottayam: D. C. Books. ISBN 978-81-264-0676-0.

== See also ==
- List of Malayalam-language authors by category
- List of Malayalam-language authors
