= Sonar Kella =

1971 mystery novel and 1974 film by Satyajit Ray

Sonar Kella (The Golden Fortress)
- First edition
- Author: Satyajit Ray
- Cover artist: Satyajit Ray
- Language: Bengali
- Genre: Detective fiction
- Publisher: Ananda Publishers
- Publication date: 1971
- Publication place: India
- Media type: Print
- Preceded by: Gangtokey Gondogol
- Followed by: Baksho Rahashya

Sonar Kella
- DVD cover art
- Directed by: Satyajit Ray
- Written by: Satyajit Ray
- Starring: Soumitra Chatterjee; Santosh Dutta; Siddartha Chatterjee; Kushal Chakraborty
- Music by: Satyajit Ray
- Production company: Government of West Bengal
- Release date: 27 December 1974
- Country: India
- Language: Bengali

Sonar Kella, also Shonar Kella, is a 1971 mystery novel written by Bengali writer and filmmaker Satyajit Ray. In 1974, Ray directed a film adaption of the book, also named Sonar Kella, starring Soumitra Chatterjee, Santosh Dutta, Siddartha Chatterjee and Kushal Chakraborty. The movie was released in the United States as The Golden Fortress. It is the first film adaptation of Ray's famous sleuth Feluda and was followed by Joi Baba Felunath, in English The Elephant God.

== Plot ==
The film begins with a school-boy Mukul Dhar (Kushal Chakraborty), who is said to be able to remember events of his previous life, and soon receives media attention. Dr. Hemanga Hajra (Sailen Mukherjee), a parapsychologist, offers his help, believing it might help him in his own research. Mukul always remains sombre and paints peacocks, forts, camels and battlescenes at midnight; he mentions that he lived in the Golden Fortress (Sonar Kella) and that their house had many gems. Dr. Hajra decides to take Mukul on a trip to Rajasthan, famous for forts, historical importance and desert landscape. Two seasoned fraudsters, Amiyanath Burman and Mandar Bose, plan to kidnap Mukul to capture the treasure. Their first attempt at the kidnapping fails when they pick up another boy, also named Mukul (Santanu Bagchi), from the same neighborhood. Alarmed by this, Mukul's father engages Pradosh Chandra Mitter a.k.a. Feluda (Soumitra Chatterjee), a private investigator, to protect his son. Feluda leaves for Rajasthan along with his cousin Tapesh a.k.a. Topshe (Siddartha Chatterjee), following Dr. Hajra. On their way, they meet and befriend Lalmohan Ganguly, a.k.a. Jatayu (Santosh Dutta), a popular thriller writer.

Meanwhile, Burman and Bose kidnap Mukul and push Dr. Hajra off a cliff to his presumed death at the Nahargarh Fort in Jaipur. Burman impersonates as Dr. Hajra and Bose impersonates as a globe-trotter. Dr. Hajra actually survives the fall and begins to pursue them. Feluda along with Topshe arrives in Jodhpur Circuit House and meets Burman, assuming him to be Dr. Hajra. Feluda begins to suspect Bose based on his clothes and his accent. Feluda even suspects "Dr. Hajra's" conduct as he appears lackadaisical in his approach. Mukul keeps saying he is followed by a "bad man". After visiting a few fortresses, Burman successfully hypnotizes Mukul, who reveals that the Golden Fortress is in Jaisalmer. Dr. Hajra reaches to the same conclusion by learning about the history of the Fort of Jaisalmer from a police inspector. Feluda learns that the Jaisalmer Fort is made of yellow limestone, giving it a golden glow. Burman leaves for Jaisalmer with Mukul immediately instructing Bose to follow suit after misguiding Feluda and others.

Bose lies to Feluda by saying that Burman/Dr. Hajra has already left with Mukul for Barmer, in order to lead him on the wrong track. Feluda suspects foul play but cannot be sure. By chance, his eye falls upon the card of Dr. Hajra; an idea flashes in his mind and he rushes to check the register of the circuit house and finds that it is signed as 'Hazra' not 'Hajra'. He is now sure about the man impersonating as Dr Hajra, and leaves for Jaisalmer by car.

While on their way to railway station, Bose strands the trio (Feluda, Topshe, and Jatayu) on the highway by puncturing the tyre of their car. Undaunted, Feluda and his team takes a camel caravan to the nearest train station Ramdevra, from which he boards on the next train to Jaisalmer. At night, in the train, Bose attacks and attempts to stab Feluda to death, who anticipates the attack and nearly captures him. After a scuffle, Bose escapes to another compartment of the train. However, moments later, Bose falls out of the train after seeing the real Dr. Hajra in the other compartment and assuming him to be a ghost.

The trio arrive in Jaisalmer along with Dr. Hajra. They rush to the fort where they find Burman searching for the treasure where Mukul recalls his home of previous life. Feluda confronts and captures Burman, telling him that there never was any treasure even if rebirth exists. They find that Mukul is cured of his obsession of previous life and has found his closure with it, and they return to Kolkata. This is where the movie ends.

== Characters ==
- Pradosh Chandra Mitter a.k.a. Feluda
- Tapesh Ranjan Mitter a.k.a. Topshe
- Lalmohan Ganguly a.k.a. Jatayu
- Sidhu Jyatha
- Mukul Dhar
- Mandar Bose
- Amiyanath Burman
- Dr. Hemanga Hajra
- Dibbhojuthi Paul
- Binay Mitra

== Cast ==
- Soumitra Chatterjee as Feluda
- Siddartha Chatterjee as Topshe
- Santosh Dutta as Jatayu
- Kushal Chakraborty as Mukul Dhar
- Kamu Mukherjee as Mandar Bose
- Harindranath Chattopadhyay as Sidhu Jyatha
- Haradhan Banerjee as Binay Mitra
- Shailen Mukherjee as Dr. Hemanga Hajra
- Ajoy Banerjee as Amiyanath Burman a.k.a. Bhavananda a.k.a. The Fake Dr Hemanga Hazra.
- Bishnupada Rudrapaul as Dibbhojuthi Paul
- Santanu Bagchi as Mukul, another boy
- Bimal Chatterjee as the grandfather of the other Mukul
- Ashok Mukherjee as the Journalist

== Crew ==
- Satyajit Ray - Director, Screenplay, Music Score (composer)
- Soumendu Roy - Cinematography
- Dulal Dutta - Editor
- Mangesh Deshai - Sound Mixing Engineer (Re recording)
- J.D Irani - Dubbing Sound Recordist
- Anil Talukdar - Guide Track Sound recordist
- Ashoke Bose - Production Designer
- Debayan Roy - Production Basic

== Awards ==
- National Film Awards for Best Screenplay & Best Direction(1974)
- Best Film, Direction and Screenplay, Government of West Bengal, 1974
- Best Feature Film for Children and Young Adults, Tehran, 1975
- National Film Award for Best Cinematography (1974)
- National Film Award for Best Child Artist (1974)
- National Film Award for Best Feature Film in Bengali (1974)

== See also ==
- Joi Baba Felunath (1979)
