= Siddhartha Chatterjee =

Indian actor and Accountant

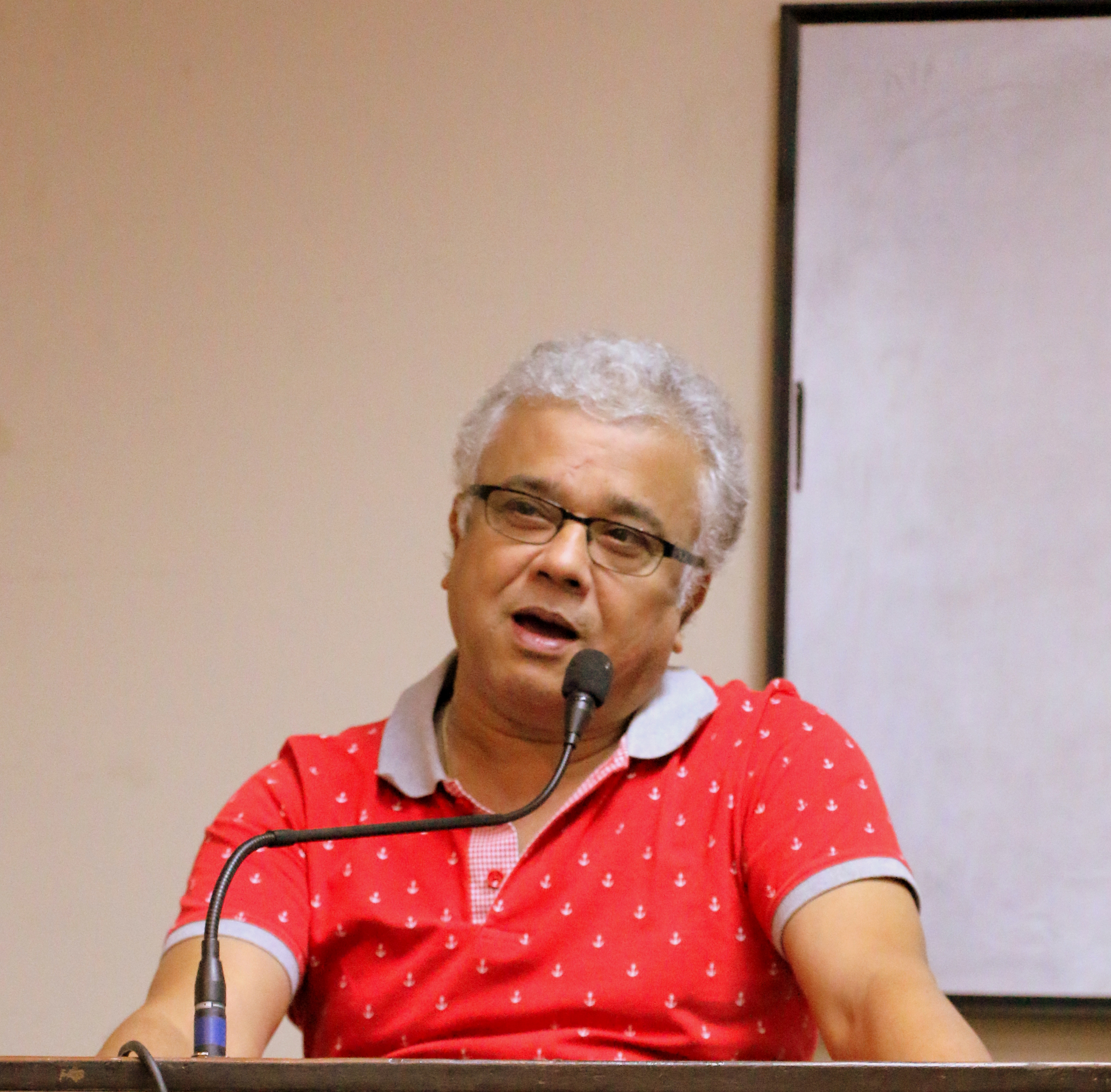
- Occupations: Accountant, Actor

Siddhartha Chatterjee is a Bengali actor, although he has not appeared in many films. He is best known for playing the role of Topshe in Satyajit Ray's films. He went on to become a qualified chartered accountant and currently is one of the founding members of the Bengali chain of restaurants called Bhojohari Manna. He is also an entrepreneur and heads an investment advisory firm.

Chatterjee is a Chartered Accountant by profession.

== Filmography ==
- 1974 Sonar Kella
- 1979 Joi Baba Felunath
- 2009 Hitlist
- 2009 Madly Bangali
- 2017 Amar Aponjon
- 2017 Posto
- 2019 Bhooter Bhobisyot
