= Joi Baba Felunath =

1979 Indian Bengali mystery film by Satyajit Ray

- A poster for Joi Baba Felunath
- Directed by: Satyajit Ray
- Written by: Satyajit Ray
- Produced by: R.D.B. Productions
- Starring: Soumitra Chatterjee; Santosh Dutta; Siddartha Chatterjee; Utpal Dutt; Monu Mukherjee; Haradhan Bandopadhyay, Biplab Chatterjee
- Release date: 5 January 1979
- Running time: 112 minutes
- Country: India
- Language: Bengali

Joi Baba Felunath
- Author: Satyajit Ray
- Cover artist: Satyajit Ray
- Language: Bengali
- Genre: Detective fiction
- Publisher: Ananda Publishers
- Publication date: 1975
- Publication place: India
- Media type: Print
- Preceded by: Royal Bengal Rahashya
- Followed by: Ghurghutiyar Ghatona

Joi Baba Felunath (English title The Elephant God) is a 1979 Indian Bengali-language mystery film directed and written by Satyajit Ray. Featuring an ensemble cast of Soumitra Chatterjee, Santosh Dutta, Siddartha Chatterjee, Utpal Dutt amongst others, it is an adaption of the eponymous Feluda novel and serves as the sequel of Sonar Kella. Shortly after the demise of actor Santosh Dutta who portrayed Jatayu's role, Ray remarked that it was impossible to ever make a Feluda film again without Dutta.

== Plot ==
Pradosh C. Mitter (a.k.a. Feluda), his cousin Tapesh (a.k.a. Topshe) and the thriller writer Lalmohan Ganguly (a.k.a. Jatayu) go to Varanasi during the Durga Puja for vacation. There they meet a Bengali family, the Ghosals. Upon hearing that Feluda is a private investigator, the Ghosal family patriarch entrusts him with the task of finding out the thief of the attempted theft that took place in their house. Meanwhile, the arrival of a saint by the name of 'Machhli Baba' in Varanasi rouses the excitement of the local people.

A very valuable property of the Ghosals, a golden Ganesh statue, about three inches in height, was the target of the thief. On the other hand, Maganlal Meghraj, a wealthy Marwari businessman, had his eyes on the Ganesh for a very long time. He learns about Feluda's involvement in this case. He invites the trio to his house and tries to bribe Feluda with Rs.2,000 in order to stop the investigation. Feluda refuses to do so, which angers Maganlal, and he sets up a knife throwing show, using Jatayu as bait (much to the viewer's amusement). After the incidents in Maganlal's house, Feluda takes a vow - either he'll avenge Jatayu's harassment, or he'll quit his job of being a detective.

Although warned by Maganlal, Feluda doesn't lose interest in the case, and deduces that Machhli Baba is actually a fraud working for Maganlal. A member of the Ghosal family, Bikash Singha, was also bribed by Maganlal to steal the Ganesh and hand it over to him. Feluda gets hold of Bikash and makes him confess his involvement in the theft. But Bikash states that when he went to steal the Ganesh, it was not there. Several questions arise in Feluda's mind. Where is the Ganesh, then? Why was the innocent idol-maker of the Ghosals, Shashibhushan Pal, murdered brutally? What plan did the Ghosal family head hatch upon with his grandson to save the Ganesh?

Finally, everything is revealed: Umanath Ghoshal's son, Rukminikumar (a.k.a. Ruku) got to know that Maganlal was planning to steal the Ganesh statue, so he hid the Ganesh statue in the idol of Maa Durga's Lion. Shashibabu, while painting the lion got the statue and handed it to Bikash—without knowing his involvement with Maganlal—before going home because of his sudden illness. Afraid that Shashibabu would reveal everything and would unintentionally ruin his plan, Maganlal sends a henchman with Bikash to liquidate Shashibabu. The henchman with the help of Bikash, tracks down Shashibabu, murders him brutally by stabbing him and disposes off the knife in the Ganges. Subsequently, after an intricately planned sting operation, Maganlal and Machhli Baba are arrested by the Varanasi police.

Feluda reveals that the idol was a replica and the actual one was safely kept in the Ghosals' bank. The Ghosals praise him for his excellent deduction and observation skills.

== Cast ==
- Soumitra Chatterjee as Feluda, the Bengali detective from Calcutta
- Utpal Dutt as Maganlal Meghraj, a Marwari businessman and the main antagonist of the film
- Santosh Dutta as Lalmohan Ganguly a.k.a. Jatayu.
- Siddartha Chatterjee as Tapesh ranjan Mitra a.k.a. Topshe, Feluda's cousin and assistant
- Jit Bose as Rukminikumar a.k.a. Ruku
- Haradhan Bandopadhyay as Umanath Ghosal, Ruku's father
- Biplab Chatterjee as Bikash Singha
- Kamu Mukherjee as Arjun, the knife-thrower in Maganlal's house (cameo)
- Monu Mukherjee as Machhli Baba (cameo)
- Panineeta Bandhyopadhyay
- Subhadra Devi
- Satya Banerjee (P.L.T.) as Niranjan Chakrabarty, the hotel manager
- Indubhushan Gujral as Inspector Tiwari
- Moloy Roy as Biswasree Gunomoy Bagchi, a bodybuilder
- Santosh Sinha as Shashibhushan Pal a.k.a. Shashibabu, the idol maker
- Bimal Chatterjee as Ambika Ghosal, the Ghoshal family patriarch
