= Thikkodiyan =

Indian author (1916–2001)

- Born: P. Kunjanandan Nair. 15 February 1916; Thikkodi, Kozhikode, Kerala, India
- Died: 28 January 2001 (aged 84); Kozhikode, Kerala
- Occupations: Novelist, playwright, lyricist, screenwriter
- Spouse: Parvathy
- Parents: Kunjappa Nair; P. Narayani Amma
- Writing career
- Notable works: Arangu Kanatha Nadan; Chuvanna Kadal; Manjuthulli; Nirahara Samaram
- Notable awards: 1974 Kerala State Film Award for Best Screenplay; 1992 Kerala Sahitya Akademi Award for Biography and Autobiography; 1992 Odakkuzhal Award; 1995 Kendra Sahitya Akademi Award; 1995 Vayalar Award; 2000 Kerala Sahitya Akademi Fellowship; 2001 Mathrubhumi Literary Award; Samastha Kerala Sahithya Parishad Award

P. Kunjanandan Nair (15 February 1916 – 28 January 2001), better known by his pseudonym, Thikkodiyan, was an Indian playwright, novelist, lyricist and screenwriter of Malayalam. He was known for his contributions to the genre of radio plays and his autobiography, Arangu Kaanatha Nadan (The actor who had never been on stage), which detailed the socio-cultural development of Malabar in the post-independent period, fetched him a number of awards including the Kendra Sahithya Academy Award, Kerala Sahitya Akademi Award for Biography and Autobiography, Vayalar Award and the Odakkuzhal Award.

== Biography ==
Thikkodiyan was born P. Kunjanandan Nair, on 15 February 1916, at Thikkodi, (Note: His pseudonym is a variant of his birth place, as suggested by noted writer, Sanjayan) a small hamlet in Kozhikode district, of the south Indian state of Kerala, to Puthiyedath Kunjappa Nair and P. Narayani Amma. He lost his parents while he was boy and was brought up by his grandfather, who was a theatre enthusiast. After schooling at Basel Mission Middle School, Koyilandy, he completed a teachers'training course and started his career as a teacher at his alma mater in 1936. There, he became involved in trade union activities and he was expelled from service when he participated in a strike in 1938. Later, he became associated with the Bharat Seva Sangham and the Devadhar Malabar Reconstruction Trust where he worked alongside K. Kelappan and V. R. Nayanar and was also involved in Nayanar Balika Sadanam, an orphanage founded by Nayanar in 1942. It was during this time, he joined Dinaprabha daily and worked there until 1948. In 1950, he moved to the All India Radio as a script writer, and spent the rest of his official career there to superannuate from service in 1979 as a drama producer.

Thikkodiyan married Parvathy in 1942 (Note: His wife died in 1949) and the couple had a daughter, Pushpa. He died at his residence in Kozhikode on 28 January 2001, at the age of 84.

== Legacy ==
P. Kunhananandan Nair began his literary career using the pen name Anand and his first poem, Veendum Karayatte was published in Mathrubhumi. Later, he wrote satires and noted humourist, Sanjayan, who published a few of them in Vishwadeepam weekly, suggested the pseudonym, Thikkodiyan which he assumed for the rest of his career. He took to writing plays in the early 1950s, while serving as a scriptwriter at the Kozhikode station of the All India Radio. His friends, Uroob, S. K. Pottekkatt. N. V. Krishna Warrier, M. V. Devan, V. Abdulla and K. A. Kodungalloor encouraged him to write a play and he wrote Jeevitham, which won a prize in a drama competition conducted by the Kendra Kala Samithy. It was the first of his plays, numbering over, 25, such as Pazhaya Bandham, Attupoya Kanni, Pushpavrishti, Mahabharatham and Kanyadanam. Apart from plays, he had also written novels, including Chuvanna Kadal, Aswahridayam and Pazhassiyude Padavaal. Drawn against the background of the sea and the Portuguese invasion, Chuvanna Kadal was among the major historical novels in Malayalam. He was considered among the major writers of radio plays in Malayalam literature. He made a foray into cinema, writing the story, screenplay and dialogues for Kunchako's 1964 film, Pazhassi Raja and he write the screenplay and dialogues for five more films which included Uttarayanam, the debut film of the award-winning director, G. Aravindan. Two other films, Nrithasala and Ithiri Poove Chuvanna Poove were based on his stories. He also wrote a song, Appolum Paranjillee, for the movie, Kadamba for which the music was scored by K. Raghavan.

Thikkodiyan, who was a part of a group of Kozhikode-based litterateurs, was also among the group of writers who regularly gathered in Vaikkom Muhammad Basheer's house in Beypore along with Uroob, M. V. Devan and M. T. Vasudevan Nair. He was known to have assisted many stage and film actors, such as Kunhandi and Balan K. Nair, in developing their careers. His autobiography. Arangu Kaanatha Nadan (The Actor Who Had Never Been on Stage), is considered one of the best among autobiographies written in Malayalam and the book fetched him several major literary awards.

== Awards ==
Thikkodiyan shared the 1974 Kerala State Film Award for Best Screenplay with G. Aravindan for the film, Uttarayanam, which was the first of his several major awards. In 1992, his autobiography, Arangu Kaanaatha Nadan, was selected for the Kerala Sahitya Akademi Award for Biography and Autobiography; the same year, the book also won the Odakkuzhal Award. Three years later, the book fetched him two more awards, the 1995 Kendra Sahitya Akademi Award and the Vayalar Award (1995). The Kerala Sahitya Akademi inducted him as a distinguished fellow in 2000 and he received the inaugural Mathrubhumi Literary Award in 2001, the year of his death. He was also a recipient of the Deviprasadam Trust Award, and Samastha Kerala Sahithya Parishad Award.

== Bibliography ==
=== Plays ===
- — (1953). Jeevitham. Calicut: Desaposhini Public Library.
- — (1954). Niraharasamaram. Calicut: P. K. Brothers.
- — (1955). Daivam Snehamanu. Calicut: Kerala Book Depot.
- — (1955). Karshakante Kireedam. Calicut: K. R. Brothers.
- — (1955). Prasavikkatha Amma (PDF). Calicut: Kerala.
- — (1955). Punyatheertham. Calicut: K. R. Brothers.
- — (1956). Attupoya Kanni (PDF). Trichur: Current Books.
- — (1956). Oru Premaganam. Calicut: K. R. Brothers.
- — (1957). Kanyadanam. Calicut: Kerala Book Depot.
- — (1957). Shashti Poorthi. Calicut: Kerala Book Depot.
- — (1957). Thikkodiyante Ekankangal. Palghat: Udhaya Publications. "4 one-act plays"
- — (1959). Pazhaya Bandham. Calicut: Desaposhini Public Library.
- — (1960). Rajamargam (PDF). Calicut: Kerala Book Depot.
- — (1961). Kannadi. Calicut: P. K. Brothers.
- — (1961). Puthiya Thettu (PDF). Trichur: Current Books.
- — (1963). Haseena. Kandassankadavu, Trichur: Gurudeva.
- — (1963). Pushpavrishti (PDF). Trichur: Mangalodayam.
- — (1964). Nurse. Trichur: Current Books.
- — (1964). Ore Kudumbam (PDF). Trichur: Mangalodayam.
- — (1965). Ekankangal. Trichur: Mangalodayam. "4 one-act plays"
- — (1965). Mithayi Maala. Calicut: P. K. Brothers.
- — (1966). Theepori (PDF). Calicut: Poorna Publications.
- — (1967). Kanakam Vilayunna Mannu. Trichur: Current Books.
- — (1967). Karutha Pennu. Trichur: Current Books.
- — (1971). Puthuppanam Kotta (PDF). Kottayam: S.P.C.S.
- — (1972). Panakizhi. Kottayam: S.P.C.S.
- — (1986). Thiranjedutha Nadakangal. Calicut: Mathrubhumi Books.
- — (2000). Mahabharatham. Kottayam: DC Books.
- — (2005). Asrupooja. Calicut: Vayanasala Pub.
- — (2010). Thikkodiyante Sampoorna Natakangal. Calicut: Mathrubhumi Books. ISBN 9788182650336.
- —. Alkkarady.
- —. Prethalokam.
- —. Yagashila.

=== Novels ===
- — (1969). Krishna sarpam.
- — (1987). Aswahridayam (PDF). Calicut: Mathrubhumi Books.
- — (1998). Madakkayathra. Kottayam: S.P.C.S.
- — (1999). Thaalappizha. Calicut: Olive Publications.
- — (2016). Chuvanna Kadal (PDF). Calicut: Eye Books Kerala. ISBN 9788193074589.
- —. Manjuthulli.
- —. Pazhassiyude Padavaal.

=== Memoirs, essays, short stories, poetry ===
- — (1952). Namasthe. Calicut: P. K. Brothers. "Poetry anthology"
- — (1952). Poothiri. Calicut: K. R. Brothers. "Satire"
- — (1966). Theeppori. Calicut: Poorna Publications. "Satire"
- — (1987). Paalakunnile yakshi. Calicut: Amukham. "Short story anthology"
- — (1991). Arangu Kanatha Nadan (PDF). Kottayam: S.P.C.S. "Autobiography"

== Filmography ==
| Year | Film | Contribution | Reference |
|---|---|---|---|
| 1964 | Pazhassi Raja | Story, screenplay, dialogues | |
| 1972 | Nrithasala | Story | |
| 1974 | Udayam Kizhakku Thanne | Story, screenplay, dialogues | |
| 1974 | Uttarayanam | Story, screenplay, dialogues | |
| 1979 | Sandhya Ragam | Story, screenplay, dialogues | |
| 1983 | Kadamba | Lyrics | |
| 1984 | Ithiri Poove Chuvanna Poove | Story | |
| 1988 | Marikkunnilla Njan | Story, screenplay, dialogues | |

== See also ==
- List of Malayalam-language authors by category
- List of Malayalam-language authors
