= Uttarayanam =

- Poster
- Directed by: G. Aravindan
- Written by: Thikkodiyan; G. Aravindan
- Produced by: Pattathuvila Karunakaran
- Starring: Dr. Mohandas; Kunju; Balan K. Nair; Adoor Bhasi; Sukumaran; Kunjandi
- Cinematography: Mankada Ravi Varma
- Edited by: A. Rameshan
- Music by: K. Raghavan; M. B. Sreenivasan
- Production company: Ganesh Movie Makers
- Release date: 11 April 1975
- Running time: 118 minutes
- Country: India
- Language: Malayalam

Uttarayanam (English: Throne of Capricorn) is a 1975 Malayalam-language film directed by G. Aravindan, who co-wrote it with Thikkodiyan. Aravindan debuted with this film. The film, which exposes opportunism and hypocrisy set against the backdrop of the Independence struggle, is inspired by Aravindan's own cartoon series, titled Cheriya Manushyarum Valiya Lokavum (Small People and Big World), which was published in Mathrubhumi for several years.

The film is about Ravi, an unemployed young man, who has to face a series of encounters during his search for a job. Ravi reflects on the past struggles of the anti-British freedom fighters he has learned about from his paralyzed father. He eventually meets Gopalan Muthalaly, a leader of Quit India movement, but now a corrupt contractor. Mohandas plays the protagonist and Kunju, Balan K. Nair, Adoor Bhasi, Kunjandi and Sukumaran play other roles. The film garnered wide critical praise and several awards, including five Kerala State Film Awards, upon release. An experimental film, it has influenced the parallel cinema movement in Kerala to a great extent.

== Plot ==
Ravi is an unemployed MA graduate who writes exams and attends interviews but fails to land a job. He lives with his mother and grandmother. His grandfather, Madhavan Menon was a Gandhian who believed in non-cooperation movement and held non-violent protests against the British. Madhavan Menon married off his daughter to Govindan who turns out to be a revolutionary who believed in Bhagat Singh and armed revolution as the only solution to oust the British Empire. Menon's brother-in-law is Adhikaari who helps the police officers to capture both Congress supporters and revolutionary rebels. Inside the revolutionary movement itself are the soft-heartened like Gopalan who betray the movements on being questioned by the police. Ravi spends time with Kumaran Master, who was a fellow revolutionary with his father. Master spends his time making masks. Both of them visit Achuthan who was another revolutionary but is now frail and bedridden. Master provides Ravi with a letter to meet Gopalan, who Ravi finds is now a rich businessman who drinks liquor with political leaders of minority communities and talk about the freedom struggle days. Ravi meets David, a college-mate of his who hated politics back then, but is now a Trade Union activist who helps Gopalan muthalali with construction of star hotel. Ravi meets Premkumar, another college-mate who is a medical representative and spends his leisure time on drinks, smoke and women. For some days, Ravi stays with Premkumar and his room-mate former Mr. Kerala and bodybuilder Balan who advises them about health being wealth. Ravi is not able to reciprocate the love shown to him by Radha. In the end, a disillusioned Ravi goes to the mountains and seeks a godman who reads to him from the Upanishads about not lusting after another person's possessions. Ravi finally arrives in the presence of a tribal woman burning leaves and throws his mask into it.

== Cast ==
Male cast

- Dr. Mohandas as Ravi
- Kunjandi as Kumaran Master, a former revolutionary
- Adoor Bhasi as Adhikari
- Sukumaran as Premkumar, Medical Representative
- Vijayan as David, Trade Union leader
- Balan K. Nair as Achuthan, a revolutionary
- Premji as Madhavan Menon, Ravi's grandfather, a staunch Congress supporter
- T. G. Ravi as Govindan, Ravi's father, a revolutionary

Female cast

- T. P. Radhamani as a mother
- Mallika Sukumaran as Radha
- Santha Devi as a grandmother

== Soundtrack ==
The music was composed by K. Raghavan.

No.	Song	Singers	Lyrics	Length (m:ss)
1	"Hridayathin Romaancham"	K. J. Yesudas	G. Kumarapilla	
2	"Kulippaanaay"	K. P. Brahmanandan, Chorus	G. Kumarapilla	
3	"Radhavadana Vilokana"	K. P. Brahmanandan	G. Kumarapilla	
4	"Sreemahaaganesha Sthothram" (Pancharathna)	P. B. Sreenivas	G. Kumarapilla	

== Awards ==
Kerala State Film Awards

- Best Film - Pattathuvila Karunakaran (producer), G. Aravindan (director)
- Best Director - G. Aravindan
- Best Screenplay - Thikkodiyan, G. Aravindan
- Best Photography (Black and white) - Mankada Ravi Varma
- Second Best Actor - Balan K. Nair
- Best Art Director - Artist Namboothiri

National Film Awards

- Award for the Best Feature Film on the 25th anniversary of India's Independence
- National Film Award for Best Feature Film in Malayalam
