= Bishamber Khanna =

Indian painter and enamelist

- Born: 1930 (age 95–96); India
- Occupations: Painter; Enamelist
- Awards: Padma Shri

Bishamber Khanna is an Indian painter and enamelist. Born in 1930, Khanna is credited with several exhibitions and his creations have been displayed at centres such as the Delhi Art Gallery. He served as a member of the jury for the 20th National Film Awards and the 22nd National Film Awards.

The Government of India awarded him the fourth highest civilian award of Padma Shri in 1990.
