= Literary works of Satyajit Ray =

Works by the Indian film director

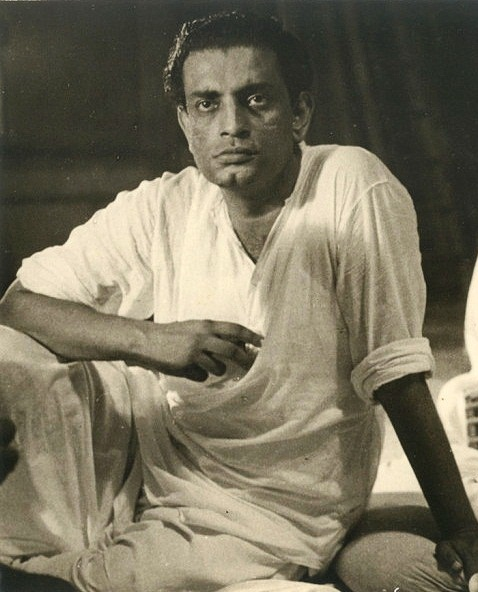
Ray during recording of his film Pather Panchali

Satyajit Ray (1921–1992), a Bengali film director from India, is well known for his contributions to Bengali literature. He created two of the most famous characters in Feluda the sleuth and Professor Shanku the scientist. He wrote several short novels and stories in addition to those based on these two characters. His fiction was targeted mainly at younger readers, though it became popular among children and adults alike.

Most of his novels and stories in Bengali have been published by Ananda Publishers, Kolkata; and most of his screenplays have been published in Bengali in the literary journal Ekshan, edited by his close friend Nirmalya Acharya. During the mid-1990s, Ray's film essays and an anthology of short stories were also published in the West. Many of the stories have been translated into English and published.

== Feluda stories ==
Feluda, whose real name is Pradosh Chandra Mitra, is a fictional Kolkata-based private detective. He is usually accompanied by 2 sidekicks: Topshe (his cousin–Tapesh Ranjan Mitra) and Lalmohan Ganguly, usually described as Lalmohan Babu (who himself writes under the pseudonym of Jatayu), a bumbling writer of crime fiction. Satyajit Ray wrote thirty-five Feluda stories, most of which were extremely popular, and made two of the Feluda stories into films: Sonar Kella (The Golden Fortress) (1974) and Joi Baba Felunath (The Elephant God) (1978).

Key
†	Indicates a television film/series	‡	Indicates Indicates a film

List of Feluda stories/novels written by Satyajit Ray
Year	Original title	English title	Form	Published in	Film/Television adaptation	
Year	Original title	English title	Form	Published in	Year	Name
1965–66	Feludar Goendagiri	Danger in Darjeeling	Short story	Sandesh		
1966–67	Badshahi Angti	The Emperor's Ring	Novel	Sandesh	2014	Badshahi Angti‡
1967	Kailash Choudhary'r Pathar	Kailash Choudhury's Jewel	Short story	Sandesh		
1970	Sheyal Debota Rahasya	The Anubis Mystery	Short story	Sandesh	1996	Sheyal Debota Rahasya†
1970	Gangtokey Gondogol	Trouble in Gangtok	Novel	Desh		
1971	Sonar Kella	The Golden Fortress	Novel	Desh	1974	Sonar Kella‡
1972	Baksho Rahashya	Incident on the Kalka Mail	Novel	Desh	1996	Baksho Rahashya† (Note: Baksho Rahashya was originally made as a telefilm but later was also released at Kolkata's Nandan complex.)
1972	Baksho Rahashya	Incident on the Kalka Mail	Novel	Desh	2001	Baksho Rahashya‡
1973	Kailashey Kelenkari	A Killer in Kailash	Novel	Desh	2007	Kailashey Kelenkari‡
1973	Samaddarer Chabi	The Key	Short story	Sandesh	2016	Double Feluda‡
1974	Royal Bengal Rahashya	The Royal Bengal Mystery	Novel	Desh	2011	Royal Bengal Rahashya‡
1975	Ghurghutiyar Ghatona	The Locked Chest	Short story	Sandesh		
1975	Joi Baba Felunath	The Mystery of the Elephant God	Novel	Desh	1979	Joi Baba Felunath‡
1976	Bombaiyer Bombete	The Bandits of Bombay	Novel	Desh	2003	Bombaiyer Bombete‡
1976	Gosainpur Sargaram	The Mystery of Walking Dead	Novel	Sandesh	1999	Gosainpur Sargaram†
1977	Gorosthaney Sabdhan	The Secret of the Cemetery	Novel	Desh	2010	Gorosthaney Sabdhan‡
1978	Chhinnamastar Abhishap	The Curse of the Goddess	Novel	Desh		
1979	Hatyapuri	The House of Death	Novel	Sandesh		
1980	Golokdham Rahasya	The Mysterious Tenant	Short story	Sandesh	2016	Double Feluda‡
1980	Joto Kando Kathmandutey	The Criminals of Kathmandu	Novel	Desh	1996	Joto Kando Kathmandutey†
1981	Napoleoner Chithi	Napoleon's Letter	Short story	Sandesh		
1982	Tintorettor Jishu	Tintoretto's Jesus	Novel	Desh	2008	Tintorettor Jishu‡
1983	Ambar Sen Antardhan Rahasya	The Disappearance of Ambar Sen	Short story	Anandamela	2013	Ambar Sen Antardhan Rahasya†
1983	Jahangirer Swarnamudra	The Gold Coins of Jahangir	Short story	Sandesh		
1984	Ebar Kando Kedarnathey	Crime in Kedarnath	Short story	Desh		
1985	Bosepukurey Khunkharapi	The Acharya Murder Case	Short story	Sandesh	1996	Bosepukurey Khunkharapi†
1986	Darjeeling Jomjomat	Murder in the Mountains	Novel	Sandesh		
1987	Apsara Theatrer Mamla	The Case of the Apsara Theatre	Short story	Sandesh		
1987	Bhuswargya Bhayankar	Peril in Paradise	Short story	Desh		
1988	Shakuntalar Kontthohar	Shakuntala's Necklace	Short story	Desh		
1989	Londoney Feluda	Feluda in London	Short story	Desh		
1989	Golapi Mukta Rahasya	The Mystery of the Pink Pearl	Short story	Sandesh		
1990	Dr. Munshir Diary	Dr. Munshi's Diary	Short story	Sandesh	2000	Dr. Munshir Diary†
1990	Nayan Rahasya	The Mystery of Nayan	Novel	Desh		
1992	Robertsoner Ruby	Robertson's Ruby	Novel	Desh		
1995–96	Indrajal Rahasya	The Magical Mystery	Short story	Sandesh		

== Professor Shanku stories ==
Professor Shanku (Professor Shonku), or Trilokeshwar Shanku, is a fictional scientist appearing in a series of science-fiction books. He lives in Giridih beside the river Usri. He has a male servant named Prahllad and a cat named Newton living in the house. He was a child prodigy and achieved several academic distinctions. He has his own laboratory in his house, where he does research for many new and fantastic inventions. He is world-renowned for the armory of these diverse inventions. The adventures of Professor Shanku are set in several countries throughout the world.

== Tarini khuro stories ==
Tarini khuro (Tarini Uncle) is an aged bachelor (khuro is an old Bengali term meaning uncle) who can tell interesting stories based on his weird experiences. Many of these stories border on being horror stories or spooky stories, while some of the stories depict the smartness and quick wit of Tarini khuro.

== Bankubabur Bandhu ==
Bankubabur Bandhu (Banku Babu's Friend or Mr. Banku's Friend) was a Bengali science fiction story Ray had written in 1962 for Sandesh, the Ray family magazine, which gained popularity among Bengalis in the early 1960s. What differentiated Bankubabur Bandhu from previous science fiction was the portrayal of an alien from outer space as a kind and playful being, invested with magical powers and capable of interacting with children, in contrast to earlier science fiction works, which portrayed aliens as dangerous creatures.

Several science fiction films were inspired by the story, including Ray's own script for The Alien (which was eventually cancelled in the late 1960s), Steven Spielberg's Close Encounters of the Third Kind (1977) and E.T. the Extra-Terrestrial (1982), and Rakesh Roshan's Koi... Mil Gaya (2003), which itself inspired the Indonesian television series Si Yoyo. The story of Bankubabur Bandhu itself was eventually adapted into a television film by Satyajit's son Sandip Ray alongside Kaushik Sen in 2006.

== Other short stories ==
Satyajit Ray penned many short stories not based on any famous characters. These stories, which used to be published as collections of twelve stories, were mostly urbane and were very unassuming until the very last line or last paragraph, where suddenly a new revelation left the reader amazed. Many of these stories dealt with the way trivial incidents change the course of one's life, while some other stories were chilling horror stories. The language of the stories was very straightforward and lucid.

Ray also translated some short stories (mostly adventure stories) from English and a collection of stories named Brazil-er Kalo Bagh was published. He also translated Ray Bradbury's 'Third Expedition' from Martian Chronicles as 'Mongol-i Shorgo' (Mars is Heaven).

=== Other books ===
- Ekei Bole Shooting
- Apur Panchali
- Toray Bandha Ghorar Dim
- Mollah Nasiruddin-er Galpo
- Brazil-er Kalo Bagh
- Pikoor Diary O Onnanyo
- Jakhon Chhoto Chilam
- Sujon Harbola
- Protikriti
- Bishoy Chalochitro
- Our Films Their Films
- Kanchenjungha (film script)
- Nayak (film script)
- Sakhaprosakha (film script)
- My Years with Apu: A Memoir
- Deep Focus

=== 12 Series ===
- Ek Dojon Gappo
- Aaro Ek Dojon
- Aaro Baro
- Ebaro Baro
- Bah! Baro
- Eker Pithe Dui
- Jabor Baro

=== Short stories ===
- ankliya
- Pterodactyl-er Dim
- Bonkubabu'r Bondhu
- Master Ansumaan
- Anko Sir, Golapi Babu O Tipu
- Shibu O Rakkhos-er Katha
- Spot-Light
- Rontur Dadu
- Sujon Harbola
- Taposher Jonaki
- Raton O Lokkhi
- Pikoo'r Diary
- Mayurkonthi Jelly
- Arjosekhor-er Janmo O Mrityu
- Kaagtaruya
- Bahuroopi
- Sahodeb Babu'r Portrait
- Brown Saheb-er Baari
- Sadaanand-er Khude Jagot
- Professor Hiji-bij-bij
- Baatik Babu
- Bhakto
- Bishful
- Load Shedding
- Mr. Shasmol-er Shesh Raatri
- Pintu'r Dadu
- First Class Kamra
- Dhappa
- Maanpatro
- Apodartho
- Sadhon Babu'r Sandeho
- Lakhpoti
- Needhiram-er Ichchha Puron
- Kanayi-er Kathaa
- Gangaram-er kapaal
- Nitai O Mahapurush
- Hauee
- Protikriti
- Norris Shaheb-er Bunglow
- Kutum Katam
- Ganesh Mutshuddi'r Portrait
- Notun Bondhu
- Shishu Saahityik
- Mohim Sanyal-er Ghatona
- Nitai Babu'r Moina
- Sahojaatri
- Duyi Bondhu
- Shilpi
- Akshaye Babu'r Shiksha
- Proshonna Sir
- Abhiraam
- Sobuj Manush
- Khagam
- Brojoburi
- Atithi
- Puroshkar
- Mrigankobabur Ghotona
- Anukul
- Kutum Katam
- Mackenzie Fruit
- Neel Atanka
- Ratan Babu Aar Shei Lokta
- Bhuto
- Bipin Chowdhury -r Smritibhrom
- Badur Beebhishika
- Gagan Chowdhury -r Studio
- Fritz
- Dui Magician
- Brazil -er Kaalo Baagh
- Mangal -i Swargo
- Brihochchonchu
- Asamanjababur Kukur
- Anathbabu -r Bhoy
- Setophus -er Khidey
- Barin Bhowmick -er Byaram
- Telephone
- Ishwarer -noi Lokkho Koti Naam
- Ami Bhoot
- Patalbabu Filmstar
- Barnandho

=== Anthologies ===
- Golpo 101 (One Hundred and One Stories)
- Sera Satyajit (Best of Satyajit)
- Aro Satyajit (More stories by Satyajit)
- Feluda Samagra 1 & 2
- Shanku Samagra
- Prabandha Sangraha

== Poetry ==
Satyajit Ray translated and wrote some limericks that were published in a collection–Toray Bandha Ghorar Dim (A bunch of Horse-Eggs!). He was also the translator of Lewis Carroll's Jabberwocky. In translation, the poem is renamed 'Joborkhaki'.

== Mullah Nasiruddin ==
A collection of very short stories based on Mullah Nasiruddin (a fictional character from the Middle East known for his witty and comic character) was collected by Satyajit Ray and published as Mullah Nasiruddiner Galpo (Stories of Mullah Nasiruddin).

== Fatik Chand ==
Fatik Chand is a dramatic mystery about the adventures of a kidnapped Calcutta schoolboy, written in Bengali. The book was made into a film in 1983 entitled Phatik Chand.

== Others ==
Sujan Harbola (Sujan the Mimic) is a collection of fables. Ekei Bole Shooting is a collection of Satyajit Ray's experiences and reflections during the making of his films. Jakhon Choto Chilam is a memoir dealing with his childhood days. Our Films, Their Films is an anthology of film criticism. Bishoy Chalachitro is another book by Ray on films.

=== By Satyajit Ray ===
- Ray, Satyajit (1 January 1998). Childhood Days: A Memoir. Penguin Books India. ISBN 978-0-14-025079-4.
- Ray, Satyajit (1 January 2001). The Best Of Satyajit Ray. Penguin Group (USA) Incorporated. ISBN 978-0-14-302805-5.
- Ray, Satyajit (2007). Satyajit Ray: Interviews. Univ. Press of Mississippi. ISBN 978-1-57806-937-8.
- Ray, Satyajit (2013). Satyajit Ray on Cinema. Columbia University Press. ISBN 978-0-231-16494-8.

=== General ===
- Bandyopādhyāẏa, Surabhi (1996). Satyajit Ray: beyond the frame. Allied Publishers. ISBN 978-81-7023-545-3.
- Cooper, Darius (13 January 2000). The Cinema of Satyajit Ray: Between Tradition and Modernity. Cambridge University Press. ISBN 978-0-521-62980-5.
- Ganguly, Keya (2010). Cinema, Emergence, and the Films of Satyajit Ray. University of California Press. ISBN 978-0-520-26216-4.
- Ghosh, Nemai; Nandi, Alok B. (1993). Satyajit Ray at 70 as writer, designer, actor, director, cameraman, editor, composer. Point of View and Orient Longman. ISBN 978-0-00-216010-0.
- Gupta, Chidananda Das (1994). The Cinema Of Satyajit Ray. National Book Trust, India. ISBN 978-81-237-0753-2.
- Rangoonwalla, Firoze (1980). Satyajit Ray's art. Clarion.
- Robinson, Andrew (1989). Satyajit Ray: The Inner Eye. University of California Press. ISBN 978-0-520-06946-6.
- Nyce, Ben (1988). Satyajit Ray: a study of his films. Praeger Frederick A. ISBN 978-0-275-92666-3.
- Seton, Marie (2003). Portrait of a Director: Satyajit Ray. Penguin Books India. ISBN 978-0-14-302972-4.

=== Individual films ===
Apu Trilogy

- Chawdhary, Surendar (14 July 2011). The Pather Panchali of Satyajit Ray: An Illustrated Study. McFarland. ISBN 978-0-7864-6353-4.
- Kutty, K. V. Raman; Ray, Satyajit (1982). A Critical Analysis of Satyajit Ray's Film Pather Panchali. Ohio State University.
- Ray, Satyajit (2006). The Apu Trilogy. Seagull Books. ISBN 978-1-905422-06-7.
- Ray, Satyajit (1984). Pather Panchali. Cine Central.
- Robinson, Andrew (15 November 2010). The Apu Trilogy: Satyajit Ray and the Making of an Epic. I. B. Tauris. ISBN 978-1-84885-515-1.
- Wood, Robin (1971). The Apu trilogy. Praeger.

== Bibliography ==
- Ray, Satyajit (2015). The Complete Adventures of Feluda. Vol. I. Penguin Books. ISBN 978-93-5214-115-9.
- Robinson, Andrew (1989). Satyajit Ray: The Inner Eye. I. B. Tauris. ISBN 1-86064-965-3.
