= Feluda (series) =

Film list of the fictional character Feluda

- Created by: Satyajit Ray
- Original work: Feludar Goendagiri (1965)

Print publications
- Novel(s): List of stories: Badshahi Angti (1969); Gangtokey Gondogol (1971); Sonar Kella (1971); Baksho Rahashya (1972); Kailashey Kelenkari (1974); Royal Bengal Rahashya (1974); Gosainpur Sargaram (1976); Chhinnamastar Abhishap (1978); Hatyapuri (1979); Tintorettor Jishu (1983); Golapi Mukta Rahasya (1989); Robertsoner Ruby (1992)
- Short stories: List of stories: "Feluda'r Goendagiri" (1965–66); "Ghurghutiyar Ghatona" (1975); "Golokdham Rahasya" (1980); "Jahangirer Swarnamudra" (1983); "Bhuswargo Bhayankar" (1987); "Golapi Mukta Rahasya"; "London e Feluda" (1989)
- Comics: List of comics

Films and television
- Film(s): Sonar Kella (1974); Joy Baba Felunath (1979); Baksho Rahashya (1996); Bombaiyer Bombete (2003); Kailashey Kelenkari (2007); Tintorettor Jishu (2008); Gorosthaney Sabdhan (2010); Doorbeen (2014); Royal Bengal Rahashya (2011); Badshahi Angti (2014); Double Feluda (2016); Hatyapuri (2022); Nayan Rahasya (2024)
- Short film(s): Feluda: The Kathmandu Caper (2011)
- Television series: Kissa Kathmandu Mein (1986–87); Noyon Rahasya-Feluda (2017)

Miscellaneous
- Portrayers: Soumitra Chatterjee; Shashi Kapoor; Sabyasachi Chakrabarty; Abir Chatterjee; Parambrata Chatterjee; Ahmed Rubel; Tota Roy Chowdhury; Indraneil Sengupta

Feluda is an Indian-Bengali detective media franchise created by Indian-Bengali film director and writer Satyajit Ray, featuring the character, Feluda. The titular character is a private investigator starring in a series of Bengali novels and short stories. The detective resides at 21 Rajani Sen Road, Ballygunge, Kolkata, West Bengal, India. Feluda first made his appearance in a Bengali children's magazine called Sandesh (সন্দেশ) in 1965, under the editorialship of Satyajit and Subhas Mukhopadhyay. His first adventure was Feludar Goendagiri (ফেলুদার গোয়েন্দাগিরি).

Feluda is often accompanied by his cousin who unofficially is also his assistant Tapesh Ranjan Mitter (affectionately called Topshe by Feluda), who serves as the narrator of the stories. From the sixth story, Sonar Kella (The Golden Fortress), the duo is joined by a popular thriller writer Jatayu (Lalmohon Ganguli).

Feluda has had been filmed at times, with the character been played by Soumitra Chatterjee, Sabyasachi Chakrabarty, Shashi Kapoor, Abir Chatterjee, Parambrata Chatterjee, Ahmed Rubel and Tota Roy Chowdhury. Satyajit Ray directed two Feluda movies — Sonar Kella (সোনার কেল্লা) (1974) and Joi Baba Felunath (জয় বাবা ফেলুনাথ) (1978) adapting two of his most popular stories. Sandip Ray made a new Feluda film series (continuation of the original series) on Feluda's adventures which started from Baksho Rahashya (1996). In this series, he made ten TV films and six theatrical films in Bengali on the character. Sandip Ray also made a stand-alone Feluda film Badshahi Angti (2014) which was intended to be the first film of a reboot series, but the series was canceled and Sandip Ray came back to the previous film series.

== Stories ==
In the Feluda series there are 35 published and four unpublished stories. The list is chronologically arranged.

Color key

- indicates "story".
- indicates "novel".
- indicates unfinished writings.

Novel/story	English title	First publication details	Plot outline	Setting	Characters		
Novel/story	English title	First publication details	Plot outline	Setting	Topshe	Jatayu	Sidhu Jyatha
Feludar Goendagiri	Danger in Darjeeling	Sandesh, December 1965 – February 1966	Feluda goes to Darjeeling with Topshe, meets Rajen Babu who gets a life threat in a letter. Feluda investigates.	Darjeeling	Yes	No	No
Badshahi Angti	The Emperor's Ring	Sandesh, May 1966 – May 1967	Feluda with Topshe and Topshe's father goes to meet Dhiru Kaka, their advocate uncle in Lucknow. There they find Dr Srivastav's house burgled the previous night and a precious ring was stolen. Feluda starts investigating secretly	Lucknow; Haridwar; Lakshman Jhula	Yes	No	No
Kailash Choudhury'r Pathar	Kailash Chowdhury's Jewel	Sharadiya Sandesh, 1967	Feluda investigates a complex case involving twins and a rare valuable gem.	Kolkata	Yes	No	No
Sheyal Debota Rahasya	The Anubis Mystery	Sandesh, Summer issue, May—June 1970	Nilmoni Sanyal buys a precious statue of Anubis from an auction. But soon the statue goes missing. Feluda is appointed to investigate.	Kolkata	Yes	No	No
Gangtokey Gondogol	Trouble in Gangtok	Sharadiya Desh, 1970	Feluda and Topshe visit Gangtok for a vacation and meet some interesting people, each having a key role in a case of a car accident, later revealed to be a well planned murder.	Gangtok; Rumtek; Pemayangste	Yes	No	No
Sonar Kella	The Golden Fortress	Sharadiya Desh, 1971	Mukul Dhar, a child of Kolkata claims that he can remember events of his previous life and informs that in his previous life he used to stay in a "Golden Fortress" of Rajasthan. Feluda finds out the truth behind it!	Rajasthan	Yes	Yes	Yes
Baksho Rahashya	Incident on the Kalka Mail	Sharadiya Desh, 1972	Dinanath Lahiri, an aged Bengali man, meets Feluda and informs that he has mistakenly swapped his briefcase in a train with one belonging to one of his co-passengers and asks Feluda to return it. Feluda discovers that there was a valuable manuscript in the suitcase of Mr. Lahiri. Feluda takes the responsibility to find out the suitcase and the manuscript.	Kolkata; New Delhi, Shimla	Yes	Yes	Yes
Samaddarer Chabi	The Key	Sharadiya Sandesh, 1973	Radharaman Samaddar, a Bengali wealthy musician, dies keeping all his money in an unknown secret place. Before dying, he utters the word "In my name... key". This might be the clue to find the hidden wealth. Feluda is asked for assistance to find out the money.	Bamungachhi; Kolkata	Yes	No	No
Kailashey Kelenkari	A Killer in Kailash	Sharadiya Desh, 1974	Feluda investigates a case of illegal trade of valuable artefacts stolen from ancient Indian temples, the latest being a 'yakshi' head sculpt from a temple in Orissa	Kolkata; Aurangabad	Yes	Yes	Yes
Royal Bengal Rahashya	The Royal Bengal Mystery	Sharadiya Desh, 1974	On an invitation by Mahitosh Sinha Roy, Lalmohon Babu takes Feluda and Topshe to a forest near Bhutan where Feluda is given a puzzle to solve. He solves that successfully, unearths hidden secrets of the Singha Ray family, solves a murder and kills a man-eater tiger in the process. He, at the end of the story is rewarded with a Tiger-skin.	Laxman Bari an imaginary place near Bhutan border 46 miles from New Jalpaiguri; Railway Station	Yes	Yes	No
Joi Baba Felunath	The Mystery of the Elephant God	Sharadiya Desh, 1975	Feluda, his cousin Topshe and the thriller writer Jatayu visit Benaras during the Durga Pujas. There a valuable small Ganesh statue from a Ghoshal family gets stolen. Feluda is appointed to find out the thief. This is also Feluda's first meeting with his nemesis Maganlal Meghraj	Benaras| | style="background:#9EFF9E;color:black;vertical-align:middle;text-align:center;" class="table-yes skin-invert"|Yes	Yes	No	
Ghurghutiyar Ghatona	The Locked Chest	Sharadiya Sandesh, 1975	Kalikinkar Majumdar from Ghughutiya, Nadia, West Bengal sends a mail to Feluda claiming him to be an admirer of Feluda and invites him to Ghurghutiya. Felua and Topshe go to the place. There in the house Kalikinkar Mukherjee shows them a talking parrot which only knows number combination to unlock a locker. The parrot says— Trinayan, o trinayan, ektu jiro. Now Feluda has to find out the number combination from those unclear words uttered by the parrot. Feluda finds that out, in addition he finds out something more— a murder.	Ghurghutiya; Nadia; West Bengal	Yes	No	No
Bombaiyer Bombete	The Bandits of Bombay	Sharadiya Desh, 1976	Pulak Ghoshal is making a Hindi film based on Jatayu's bestseller. But a mysterious man named Sanyal has other plans for the simpleton thriller writer	Mumbai	Yes	Yes	No
Gosainpur Sargaram	The Mystery of the Walking Dead	Sharadiya Sandesh, 1976	Gosaipur is a small town, not far from Kolkata. But the erstwhile zamindar of that area has lost faith in his son, and is becoming increasingly dependent on an astrologer who claims to bring back the dead! Feluda investigates.	Gosainpur] Burdwan District; West Bengal	Yes	Yes	No
Gorosthaney Sabdhan	The Secret of the Cemetery	Sharadiya Desh, 1977	A man is found lying unconscious after a stormy evening at South Park Street Cemetery. Feluda goes to investigate and finds the man's wallet there. He meets the injured victim himself. He senses something wrong and starts an investigation on his own, which leads him to deep secrets lying in the history of the city of Kolkata.	Kolkatan	Yes	Yes	Yes
Chhinnamastar Abhishap	The Curse of the Goddess	Sharadiya Desh, 1978	Feluda and team visits Hazaribagh in Jharkhand, and gets invited by a puzzle loving retired advocate in his birthday party. The advocate dies in an incident but not before giving cryptic clues to Feluda.	Hazaribagh, Jharkhand	Yes	Yes	No
Hatyapuri	The House of Death	Sharadiya Sandesh, 1979	Feluda and Co goes to Puri to escape the heat of Kolkata. The mystery revolves around Mr. D.G. Sen, an elderly gentleman, who has the hobby of collecting rare 'Puthis' (old hand written books/manuscripts). He is a true collector and denies lucrative offers from prospective buyers. However, a group of people are determined to steal the most valuable manuscripts from his collection. Topshe and Jatayu discover a dead body lying on the beach. The story takes a big turn when one of the prime suspects is found to be murdered. Feluda investigates.	Puri, Odisha	Yes	Yes	No
Golokdham Rahasya	The Mysterious Tenant	Sandesh May—August 1980	A theft of immensely valuable research papers takes place in the house of a retired scientist. Feluda is called in to investigate, and finds the case much more complex than expected as a tenant of the house is murdered.	Kolkata	Yes	No	Yes
Joto Kando Kathmandute	The Criminals of Kathmandu	Sharadiya Desh, 1980	Feluda goes to Nepal to catch a murderer, and discovers the case to be far more complicating than it seems. While investigating, Jatayu gets drugged and Feluda meets an old enemy.	Kathmandu; Patan, Nepal	Yes	Yes	No
Napoleoner Chithi	Napoleon's Letter	Sharadiya Sandesh, 1981	A pet bird gets stolen the day after it was bought. And in the same house, an aged curio collector is murdered by a person who seemingly doesn't exist. Do the two mysteries have any link? Feluda investigates.	Barasat, 24 Pargana District, West Bengal	Yes	Yes	No
Tintorettor Jishu	Tintoretto's Jesus	Sharadiya Desh, 1982	Feluda meets an aristocratic Bengali family with a rich history. During his stay, a valuable painting by Italian painter Tintoretto is stolen, Feluda investigates and lands up in Hong Kong.	Baikunthapur, Bhagwangarh (an imaginary place 45 km west of Chhindwara), Hong Kong	Yes	Yes	No
Ambar Sen Antordhan Rahasya	The Disappearance of Ambar Sen	Anandamela 4 May—15 June 1983	Ambar Sen, a Bengali comes to Feluda and informs him that he has got threatening mail. Later Mr. Sen is kidnapped. Feluda investigates.	Kolkata	Yes	Yes	No
Jahangirer Swarnamudra	The Gold Coins of Jahangir	Sharadiya Sandesh, 1983	The trio of Feluda, Jatayu and Tapesh has been invited to Panihati to investigate the case of a missing gold coin of Jahangir. The client had a collection of 12 gold coins but on his last birthday, one of them was stolen by one of his most trusted invitees. He invites the same group of people this year and asks Feluda to catch the culprit while hiding his true identity.	Panihati	Yes	Yes	No
Ebar Kando Kedarnathe	Crime in Kedarnath	Sharadiya Desh, 1984	Feluda, along with Jatayu and Topshe goes to Kedarnath, in the Himalayan belt, to stop a possible crime which can happen against a retired maverick chemist, Bhavani Upadhay. It soon turns out that Upadhyay has, in his possession, a valuable artefact, awarded to him for his services to a king. The trio, while trying to find out the man and warn him of the coming danger, also learn about Upadhyay's life, which is somehow connected to Jatayu.	Kedarnath, Uttarkhand	Yes	Yes	No
Bosepukure Khunkharapi	The Acharya Murder Case	Sharadiya Sandesh, 1985	Indra Narayan Acharya, a theatre artist from a rich family gets murdered. Is it one of the rival theatre groups, or a person Acharya thought to be trustworthy? Feluda investigates.	Kolkata	Yes	Yes	No
Darjeeling Jamjomat	Murder in the Mountains	Sharadiya Desh, 1986	Feluda and team joins a film crew shooting the 2nd film based on Jatayu's books. A murder happens during the shoot. Another body is found in the forest. Feluda investigates.	Darjeeling	Yes	Yes	No
Bhuswargo Bhayankar	Peril in Paradise	Sharadiya Desh, 1987	Feluda and co. goes to Kashmir. They meet a retired judge who attempts calling the spirits of the criminals whom he sentenced to death, but is secretly unconvinced by their crime. He is found murdered after a few days. Feluda tries to find out the murderer.	Jammu And Kashmir	Yes	Yes	No
Apsara Theaterer Mamla	The Case of the Apsara Theatre	Sharadiya Sandesh, 1987	A notable theatre personality is found murdered, and Feluda attempts to uncover the mystery.	Kolkata; Digha	Yes	Yes	No
Shakuntalar Kanthahaar	Shakuntala's Necklace	Sharadiya Desh, 1988	Feluda and Co meet and befriend a Lucknow resident, whose family is a fan of the investigator, on a pleasure trip to the same city and get invited to his house. There, a necklace of late actress Shakuntala Devi, mother-in-law of the host, gets stolen, and Feluda must unmask the culprit of not only the theft, but also a murder.	Lucknow	Yes	Yes	No
Golapi Mukta Rahasya	The Mystery of the Pink Pearl	Sharadiya Desh, 1989	Joychaand Baral possesses an extremely rare object – a Pink Pearl, which has sought attention of quite a few influential people, notably Maganlal Meghraj, the nemesis of Feluda. Can Feluda stop him before he plans another crime to possess the pearl?	Kolkata; Benaras	Yes	Yes	Yes
Londone Feluda	Feluda in London	Sharadiya Desh, 1989	Feluda goes to London on request of Ranjan Majumdar, a client, to find out about a British man who is dead. The person is connected to Majumdar's student life in London, which Majumdar has no memory of.	London; Kolkata	Yes	Yes	No
Dr. Munshir Diary	Dr. Munshi's Diary	Sharadiya Sandesh, 1990	Eminent psychiatrist Dr. Munshi engages Feluda in a 'simple' task of ensuring cooperation of 2 men with a criminal history, whom Munshi had previously cured of mental disorder, as he is about to release facts about their treatment in his autobiography. Soon, however, Feluda finds himself in the thick of matters as Dr. Munshi is murdered, and the autobiography goes missing.	Kolkata	Yes	Yes	No
Nayan Rahasya	The Mystery of Nayan	Sharadiya Desh, 1990	A magician finds a boy with special abilities and takes him to Chennai for a show. Feluda is asked to ensure the boy's safety.	Chennai, Tamil Nadu	Yes	Yes	No
Robertsoner Ruby	Robertson's Ruby	Sharadiya Desh, 1992	Feluda & Co. is involved in a quest to save a valuable Ruby which was taken from India to London during the Sepoy Mutiny. During the course of events, old wounds resurface, uncovering a brutal event which happened when India was under British rule.	Birbhum; West Bengal	Yes	Yes	No
Indrajal Rahasya	The Magical Mystery	Sandesh December 1995 – February 1996	A retired magician calls Feluda to check a manuscript of a book, which will be bought by another magician, Suryakumar. A small statue of Krishna gets stolen and a murder also occurs, which Feluda investigates, while bringing to light the buried secrets of the magician's family.	Kolkata	Yes	Yes	No
Baksho Rahasya (first draft)	The Mystery of the Box	Sharadiya Sandesh, 1995		on Kalka Mail	Yes	Yes	No
Tota Rahasya (first draft)	The Mystery of the Parrot	Sharadiya Sandesh	A boy asks Feluda to investigate about his missing parrot. Feldua and Topshe goes with the boy and his father to their house and sees that the birdcage is still there although the bird is missing. Feluda and Topshe finds out that it was not a parrot but an Alexandrine parakeet.		Yes		
Tota Rahasya (second draft)	The Mystery of the Parrot	Sharadiya Sandesh			Yes		
Aditya Bardhaner Abishkar (Unfinished)	The Discovery by Aditya Vardhan	Sharadiya Sandesh (written 1983)	On a train, the trio of Feluda, Topesh, and Laal Mohon Ganguly meets a scientist named Aditya Vardhan who has found an alternative formula to petrol oil. A man comes to their compartment to meet them and tells the scientist that he is interested to buy the formula and leaves. Vardhan says that he got offers from other foreign chemical companies too. After the man leaves, Aditya Vardhan tells the trio that he is going to meet an American company representative to talk about a deal concerning his discovery.	Agra	Yes	Yes	No

== Films ==
Number	Title	Year	Director	Producer	Timeline
1	Sonar Kella	1974	Satyajit Ray	Government of West Bengal	Feluda Original Film Series
2	Joi Baba Felunath	1979	Satyajit Ray	R.D.B. Productions	Feluda Original Film Series
3	Bombaiyer Bombete	2003	Sandip Ray	Ushakiran Movies D. Ramanaidu	Feluda New Film Series (continuation of "Feluda Original Film Series")
4	Kailashey Kelenkari	2007	Sandip Ray	Indranil Sen Mou Raychowdhury Sumita Bhattacharyay	Feluda New Film Series (continuation of "Feluda Original Film Series")
5	Tintorettor Jishu	2008	Sandip Ray	T Sarkar Productions	Feluda New Film Series (continuation of "Feluda Original Film Series")
6	Gorosthaney Sabdhan	2010	Sandip Ray	Mou Raychowdhury	Feluda New Film Series (continuation of "Feluda Original Film Series")
7	Royal Bengal Rahashya	2011	Sandip Ray	Shree Venkatesh Films Surinder Films	Feluda New Film Series (continuation of "Feluda Original Film Series")
8	Double Feluda	2016	Sandip Ray	Eros International	Feluda New Film Series (continuation of "Feluda Original Film Series")
9	Badshahi Angti	2014	Sandip Ray	Shree Venkatesh Films, Surinder Films	A Stand-Alone Reboot Film
10	Hatyapuri	2022	Sandip Ray	Shadow Films, Ghoshal Media and Entertainment	Feluda Reboot Film Series
11	Nayan Rahasya	2024	Sandip Ray	Surinder Films	Feluda Reboot Film Series
12	Doorbeen	2014	Swagato Chowdhury		Unofficial Film

=== Film Series Timeline ===
The first two film of the series was directed by Satyajit Ray in the 70's and later films by his son Sandip Ray from the 90's till now. In the first two films Sonar Kella (1974) and Joi Baba Felunath (1978), Feluda was played by Soumitra Chatterjee. Sabyasachi Chakrabarty was playing the character from Baksho Rahashya (1996) to Double Feluda (2016).

Timeline of Feluda Films (1974–2024) (Including Feluda Original Film Series and Reboot Film Series)
Year(s)	Feature films
1974	Sonar Kella
1979	Joi Baba Felunath
1996–1997	Baksho Rahashya, Gosaipur Sargaram, Sheyal Debota Rahasya, Bosepukure Khunkharapi, Joto Kando Kathmandute
1998–1999	Jahangirer Swarnamudra, Ghurghutiyar Ghotona, Golapi Mukto Rahashya, Ambar Sen Antardhan Rahashya
2000	Dr. Munshir Diary
2003	Bombaiyer Bombete
2007	Kailashey Kelenkari
2008	Tintorettor Jishu
2010	Gorosthaney Sabdhan
2011	Royal Bengal Rahashya
2014	Badshahi Angti (A Stand-Alone Reboot Film)
2016	Double Feluda (Last film of the "Feluda Original Film Series")
2022	Hatyapuri (First film of "Feluda Reboot Film Series")
2024	Nayan Rahasya (Second film of "Feluda Reboot Film Series")
Notes: Baksho Rahashya, Gosaipur Sargaram, Sheyal Debota Rahasya, Bosepukure Khunkharapi, Joto Kando Kathmandute, Jahangirer Swarnamudra, Ghurghutiyar Ghotona, Golapi Mukto Rahashya, Ambar Sen Antardhan Rahashya, Dr. Munshir Diary all these feature films were television films.

=== Hindi movie based on Feluda ===
In September 2016, Sandip Ray sold the rights to Sonar Kella to Pradeep Sarkar. Pradeep is to remake Sonar Kella, directed by Satyajit Ray, in Hindi. Nothing has been announced about the casting.

Scripting of the Hindi adaptation of this cult detective story is currently in progress. Over the years, many in Bollywood have expressed their desire to make Feluda in general and Sonar Kella in particular. Director Shoojit Sircar was in the news for hoping to adapt Sonar Kella in Hindi. However, Sarkar finally walked away with the prized rights.

"Yes, it's true that I have bought the rights of 'Sonar Kella'. It will be inspired from 'Sonar Kella'. I have the Hindi rights to only this film and not the Feluda series. I am trying to make something very different. Once this script is ready, I will discuss it with Sandip Ray," Sarkar said.

Incidentally, no other director apart from the maestro himself and his son have ever directed a Feluda film in Bengali. Only Bibhas Chakraborty has made two Feluda telefilms. However, Sandip has been open to the idea of a good director adapting Feluda in Hindi. "I have given the rights of Baba's short story to Dibakar Banerjee. I have always maintained that if the director is competent, I am open to giving the Feluda rights in Hindi," he said.

According to Ray, the original names of the characters, including Feluda, Topshe, Jatayu, Mukul and Mandar Bose, will be changed in the Sarkar film. "I wanted to give the Hindi remake rights to a Bengali director. The advantage is that a Bengali director will have read the original book and watched the film. Things became very easy-going when Pradeep Sarkar met me to discuss this adaptation. It was a very warm and friendly meeting," Ray said, keeping the charges for remake rights a secret.

By 2017, Ray expected Sarkar to show him the screenplay. "As of now, we have had no discussions regarding the casting," Ray said. Will he want to collaborate with Sarkar once the Hindi film goes on the floor? "No, it will be his baby," Ray said.

Rumour of Hindi Feluda movie by Shoojit Sircar

In September 2013, director Shoojit Sircar told the Indian media that if he got any chance to remake Satyajit Ray's Sonar Kella for a worldwide audience, he would cast actor Aamir Khan as Feluda. However, in later years Sandip Ray confirmed that this would never happen, and Shoojit Sircar also stated he had told it as a joke, he was never serious about it and he had never thought of making a Feluda film. As of September 2016, according to media reports, director Shoojit Sircar was trying to acquire the rights to Sonar Kella.

== Television and streaming ==
=== 90s TV Films ===
This films are the continuation of the Feluda original film series.

Year	Film	Director	Package	Aired on	Notes
1996–1997	Baksho Rahashya	Sandip Ray	Feluda 30	DD Bangla	The film was the sequel of Joi Baba Felunath (1978). First aired on DD Bangla. Later released in Nandan Complex and on DVD and VCD.
1996–1997	Gosaipur Sargaram	Sandip Ray	Feluda 30	DD Bangla	Rabi Ghosh died after portraying Jatayu in this telefilm.
1996–1997	Sheyal Debota Rahasya	Sandip Ray	Feluda 30	DD Bangla	
1996–1997	Bosepukure Khunkharapi	Sandip Ray	Feluda 30	DD Bangla	
1996–1997	Joto Kando Kathmandute	Sandip Ray	Feluda 30	DD Bangla	Anup Kumar died after portraying Jatayu in this telefilm.
1998–1999	Jahangirer Swarnamudra	Sandip Ray	Satyajiter Goppo	DD Bangla	This is the first time Bibhu Bhattacharya portrayed Jatayu.
1998–1999	Ghurghutiyar Ghotona	Sandip Ray	Satyajiter Goppo	DD Bangla	
1998–1999	Golapi Mukto Rahashya	Sandip Ray	Satyajiter Goppo	DD Bangla	
1998–1999	Ambar Sen Antardhan Rahashya	Sandip Ray	Satyajiter Goppo	DD Bangla	
2000	Dr. Munshir Diary	Sandip Ray	Satyajiter Priyo Golpo	ETV Bangla	This was the last time Bibhu Bhattacharya played Jatayu in a Feluda telefilm. The sequel of this television film was the theatrical film Bombaiyer Bombete (2003).

=== TV films and TV series of 1980s, early 1990s and 2010s ===
These TV series and Telefilms are not part of the original Feluda film series which was directed by Satyajit Ray and his son Sandip Ray.

Year	Series	Director	Aired on
1986	Kissa Kathmandu Mein	Sandip Ray	DD National
1992	Ghurghutiyar Ghotona	Bibhash Chakraborty	DD Bangla
1992	Golokdham Rahasya	Bibhash Chakraborty	DD Bangla
2019	Noyon Rahasya-Feluda	Tauquir Ahmed	A Bangladeshi TV series and web series inspired by original Feluda which is telecasting in Channel i And, it features veteran actor Ahmed Rubel as Feluda.

=== Streaming Television Series ===
- Feluda (Directed by Parambrata Chatterjee)

A Bangladeshi streaming TV series "Feluda" from Bioscopelive streaming platform was directed by Parambrata Chatterjee who also played the title character along with Riddhi Sen playing Topshe was released in 2017–2018 in three seasons. This streaming TV series is not a part of the Feluda film canon directed by Satyajit Ray and Sandip Ray. Stories adapted were Sheyal Debota Rahasyo, Ghurghutiyar Ghotona, and Golokdham Rahasya and aired on Bioscopelive from September 2017. The series became available in India on digital platform Addatimes.

- Feluda - Noyon Rohoshsho (Directed by Tauquir Ahmed)

A Bangladeshi streaming TV series "Feluda" from Bioscopelive streaming platform was directed by Tauquir Ahmed was released in 2019 as a mini-series consisting of 3 episodes. While the story remains based on Ray's 1980 novel, this was the first major Feluda production with an entirely Bangladeshi cast and crew. At the forefront of the investigation is the late Ahmed Rubel as Pradosh C. Mitter, better known as Feluda. He is joined by Rawnak Hasan as Topse, who provides the essential youthful energy and observant narration required of Feluda's cousin and assistant. Completing the trio is Azad Abul Kalam as the Lalmohan Ganguly (Jatayu).

- Feluda Pherot (Directed by Srijit Mukherji)

In 2020 a streaming web series was announced, named ‘Feluda Pherot’ based on the iconic Bengali detective and based on two popular stories, ‘Chhinnamastar Abhishap’ and 'Joto Kando Kathmandute'. Bengali actors Tota Roy Chowdhury is playing the main character 'Feluda' and Kalpan Mitra as 'Topesh' seemed to be his young assistant and the iconic character Lalmohan Ganguly, alias 'Jatayu' is playing by Anirban Chakraborty.

It is available to stream on the web platform addatimes. The Season 1 released on 26 December 2020. The Season 2 released on October 2025.

- Feludar Goyendagiri (Directed by Srijit Mukherji)

The second series named Feludar Goyendagiri is from Hoichoi streaming service with the same cast and crew of Feluda Pherot. Darjeeling Jawmjawmat, the first season released on 17 June 2022. Second season "Bhuswargo Bhoyonkor", based on the novel of the same name was released on December 2024. From third season, Kamaleshwar Mukherjee took over the directing duties, adapting "Royal Bengal Rahasya" which released on December 2025. Fourth season, based on "Baksho Rahasya" is slated to release on January 2027.

- Shabash Feluda (Directed by Arindam Sil)

The series is based on Gangtoke Gondogol, spiritual sequel to the Parambrata's Feluda series. The story is centered on Feluda (Parambrata Chattopadhyay) and Topshe (Rwitobroto Mukherjee) who are on a family vacation in Gangtok. Shabash Feluda released on released on 5 May 2023.

=== Animated ===
- In 2010 an animated TV film produced by DQE Productions titled Feluda: The Kathmandu Caper was produced and the rights were acquired by Disney Channel (India). The movie premiered on 1 January 2011. DQE Productions also made a 13-episode animation series named Mysteries and Feluda after the animated TV film for Disney XD (India). The series including the TV film was set into a new universe, where Feluda, Topshe and Jatayu have many gadgets. The series is available on Amazon Prime Video India.

== Documentary ==
A Bengali documentary film Feluda: 50 Years of Ray's Detective was directed by Sagnik Chatterjee. This is the first biopic of India based on a fictional character. This film was released on 7 June 2019. Sandip Ray and many cast members were featured in the film.

== Cast and characters ==
Character	Satyajit Ray's Feluda original film series		Sandip Ray films							Unofficial film	Short film	Hindi TV film of 1986 and Bengali TV films of 1992 (directed by Sandip Ray and Bibhash Chakraborty respectively)			TV films of 90s (Sandip Ray films)											Tauquir Ahmed's Web Series
Character	Satyajit Ray's Feluda original film series		New Feluda film series (continuation of the original Feluda film series)						A stand-alone reboot film	Unofficial film	Short film	Hindi TV film of 1986 and Bengali TV films of 1992 (directed by Sandip Ray and Bibhash Chakraborty respectively)			New Feluda film series (continuation of the original Feluda film series)										Animated	Web Series
Character	Sonar Kella (1974)	Joi Baba Felunath (1979)	Bombaiyer Bombete (2003)	Kailashey Kelenkari (2007)	Tintorettor Jishu (2008)	Gorosthaney Sabdhan (2010)	Royal Bengal Rahashya (2011)	Double Feluda (2016)	Badshahi Angti (2014)	Doorbeen (2014)	Feluda (2013)	Ghurghutiyar Ghotona (1992)	Golokdham Rahasya (1992)	Kissa Kathmandu Ka (1986)	Baksho Rahashya (1996)	Gosaipur Sargaram (1996)	Sheyal Debota Rahasya (1996)	Bosepukure Khunkharapi (1996)	Joto Kando Kathmandute (1996)	Jahangirer Swarnamudra (1999)	Ghurghutiyar Ghotona (1999)	Golapi Mukto Rahashya (1999)	Ambar Sen Antardhan Rahashya (1999)	Dr. Munshir Diary (2000)	Feluda: The Kathmandu Caper (2010)	Noyon Rahasya-Feluda(2017)
Prodosh Chandra Mitra Feluda	Soumitra Chatterjee	Soumitra Chatterjee	Sabyasachi Chakrabarty	Sabyasachi Chakrabarty	Sabyasachi Chakrabarty	Sabyasachi Chakrabarty	Sabyasachi Chakrabarty	Sabyasachi Chakrabarty	Abir Chatterjee	Sabyasachi Chakrabarty	Udai Paul	Soumitra Chatterjee	Soumitra Chatterjee	Shashi Kapoor	Sabyasachi Chakrabarty	Sabyasachi Chakrabarty	Sabyasachi Chakrabarty	Sabyasachi Chakrabarty	Sabyasachi Chakrabarty	Sabyasachi Chakrabarty	Sabyasachi Chakrabarty	Sabyasachi Chakrabarty	Sabyasachi Chakrabarty	Sabyasachi Chakrabarty	Animated	Ahmed Rubel
Tapesh Ranjan Mitra Topse	Siddartha Chatterjee	Siddartha Chatterjee	Parambrata Chatterjee	Parambrata Chatterjee	Parambrata Chatterjee	Saheb Bhattacharya	Saheb Bhattacharya	Saheb Bhattacharya	Sourav Das		Unknown	Indranil Haldar	Samrat Sengupta	Alankar Joshi	Saswata Chatterjee	Saswata Chatterjee	Saswata Chatterjee	Saswata Chatterjee	Saswata Chatterjee	Saswata Chatterjee	Saswata Chatterjee	Saswata Chatterjee	Saswata Chatterjee	Saswata Chatterjee	Animated	
Lalmohan Ganguly Jatayu	Santosh Dutta	Santosh Dutta	Bibhu Bhattacharya	Bibhu Bhattacharya	Bibhu Bhattacharya	Bibhu Bhattacharya	Bibhu Bhattacharya				Unknown			Mohan Agashe	Rabi Ghosh	Rabi Ghosh		Anup Kumar	Anup Kumar	Bibhu Bhattacharya		Bibhu Bhattacharya	Bibhu Bhattacharya	Bibhu Bhattacharya	Animated	
Shiddeshwar Basu Sidhu Jyatha	Harindranath Chattopadhyay			Haradhan Bandopadhyay		Haradhan Bandopadhyay		Paran Bandyopadhyay					Manoj Mitra		Ajit Bandyopadhyay (actor)							Dibya Bhattacharya				
Binay Krishna Mitra Topshe's father	Haradhan Bandopadhyay								Deepankar De																	
Mukul Dhar	Kushal Chakraborty																									
Dr. Hemanga Hajra	Shailen Mukherjee																									
Amiyanath Burman	Ajoy Banerjee																									
Mandar Bose	Kamu Mukherjee																									
Maganlal Meghraj		Utpal Dutt												Utpal Dutt					Mohan Agashe			Mohan Agashe			Animated	
Ruku		Jit Bose																								
Umanath Ghosal		Haradhan Bandopadhyay																								
Bikash		Biplab Chatterjee																								
Gopinath Gorey / Sanyal			Ashish Vidyarthi																							
Nimmo			Rajatava Dutta																							
Pulok Ghoshal			Paran Bandyopadhyay			Mentioned only																				
Victor Perumal			Rajesh Sharma																							
Inspector Patwardhan			Aanjjan Srivastav																							
Mr. Chattoraj / Rakshit				Deepankar De																						
Jayanta Mullick				Biplab Chatterjee																						
Robin Chowdhury / Rajsekhar Neogi					Tota Roy Chowdhury																					
Nandakumar / Fake Rudrasekhar Neogi					Silajit Majumder																					
Hiralal Somani					Biswajit Chakraborty																					
Purnendu Paul					Paran Bandyopadhyay																					
Dr. Priyobroto Sikdar						Dwijen Bandyopadhyay																				
Mahadeb Chowdhury						Dhritiman Chatterjee																				
Mr. Arakis						Tamal Ray Chowdhury																				
William Girindranath Biswas						Subhasish Mukherjee																				
Michael Narendranath Biswas						Pradip Mukherjee																				
Marcus Godwin						Tinnu Anand																				
Haripada						Unknown												Unknown					Unknown			
Mahitosh Singha Ray							Dr. Basudeb Mukherjee				Shailesh Singh															
Tarit Sengupta							Bhaswar Chatterjee				Siddharth Kaushik															
Debotosh Singha Ray							Paran Bandyopadhyay				Unknown															
Shashanka Sanyal							Debesh Raychowdhury				Niloy Kundu															
Madhablal							Sanjib Sarkar				Unknown															
Dibendyu Biswas							Biplab Chatterjee				Unknown															
Manimohan Samaddar								Bratya Basu																		
Nihar Ranjan Dutta								Dhritiman Chatterjee																		
Surajit Dasgupta / Dharani Dhar Samaddar								Saswata Chatterjee																		
Mr. Sukhwani								Rajesh Sharma																		
Ranajit Bandyopadhyay								Gaurav Chakraborty																		
Mr. Dastur / Suprakash Chowdhury								Biswajit Chakraborty																		
Abani Sen								Subhrajit Dutta																		
Subir Dutta								Bhaskar Banerjee																		
Bonbihari Sarkar									Paran Bandyopadhyay																	
Ganesh Guha									Rajatava Dutta																	
Dhirendra Kumar Sanyal									Biswajit Chakraborty																	
Dr. Shrivastav									Bharat Kaul																	
Inspector Gorgory									Dwijen Banerjee																	
Mahabir									Tathagata Mukherjee																	
Byomkesh Bakshi										Soumitra Chatterjee																
Pupul										Rangeet																
Tatai										Diptodeep																
Bhebli										Ahana																
Gobinda Gargori										Shantilal Mukherjee																
Pupul's mother										Anjana Basu																
Madhabi Dutta										Aparajita Auddy																
Dinanath Lahiri															Haradhan Bandopadhyay											
Prabir Lahiri															Pradip Mukherjee											
Naresh Chandra Pakrashi															Dibya Bhattacharya											
G. C. Dhameeja															Rajaram Yagnik											
Dr. Rajen Munshi																								Subhendu Chatterjee		
Arun Sengupta																								Dipankar De		
Shankar Munshi																								Shankar Chakraborty		
Chandranath Bose																								Kaushik Sen		
Sukhamoy Chakraborty																								Arindam Sil		
Dolly Munshi																								Bratati Bandyopadhyay		
Radhakanta Mallick																								Bhishma Guhathakurta		
George Higgins																								Lew Hilt		

== Awards ==
=== National Awards ===
Award	Film	
Award	Sonar Kella	Joi Baba Felunath
Best Feature Film in Bengali	Won	
Best Direction	Won (Satyajit Ray)	
Best Screenplay	Won (Satyajit Ray)	
Best Child Artist	Won (Kushal Chakraborty)	
Best Cinematography	Won (Soumendu Roy)	
Best Children's Film		Won

=== Other awards ===
Film	Occasion	Award	Awardee	Result
Sonar Kella	Chicago International Film Festival	Best Feature Film	Sonar Kella	Nominated
Bombaiyer Bombete	Anandalok Awards	Best Actor	Sabyasachi Chakrabarty	Won
Bombaiyer Bombete	Bengal Film Journalists' Association Awards	Best Screenplay	Sandip Ray	Won

== See also ==
- Tarini Khuro
- Tarini Khuro in other media
- Byomkesh Bakshi in other media
- Kakababu
- Kakababu in other media
