= Double Feluda =

2016 Indian Bengali film by Sandip Ray

- First look
- Directed by: Sandip Ray
- Based on: Samaddarer Chabi and Golokdham Rahasya by Satyajit Ray
- Produced by: Kamal Mukut
- Starring: Sabyasachi Chakrabarty; Saheb Bhattacharya; Dhritiman Chatterjee; Bratya Basu; Saswata Chatterjee; Gaurav Chakrabarty; Paran Bandopadhyay; Rajesh Sharma
- Cinematography: Sirsha Ray
- Edited by: Subrata Roy
- Music by: Sandip Ray; Satyajit Ray
- Production companies: Eros International; MM Movies
- Release date: 16 December 2016
- Running time: 115 minutes
- Country: India
- Language: Bengali

Double Feluda is a 2016 Bengali language crime thriller detective film, based on the Bengali sleuth Feluda, created by the acclaimed and renowned Oscar-winning director Satyajit Ray. It is the 19th film in the Feluda series. Directed by his son Sandip Ray, the film marks the comeback of both Sabyasachi Chakraborty and Saheb Bhattacharya, with the former returning to the eponymous role of Feluda and the latter playing his sidekick. This is a sequel of Royal Bengal Rahashya (2011). The film was released on 16 December 2016 to mark the 50th anniversary of the iconic creation. The film is based on two Feluda stories - Samaddarer Chabi and Golokdham Rahasya.

== Cast ==
- Sabyasachi Chakraborty as Feluda
- Saheb Bhattacharya as Topshe
- Paran Bandopadhyay as Sidhu Jyatha
- Bratya Basu as Manimohan Samaddar
- Dhritiman Chatterjee as Nihar Ranjan Dutta
- Saswata Chatterjee as Surajit Dasgupta/Dharani Dhar Samaddar
- Rajesh Sharma as Mr. Sukhwani
- Gaurav Chakrabarty as Ranajit Bandopadhyay
- Biswajit Chakraborty as Mr. Dastur/Suprakash Chowdhury
- Subhrajit Dutta as Abani Sen
- Bhaskar Banerjee as Subir Ranjan Dutta
- Nimai Ghosh as Anukul da
- Sadhan Sen
- Arup Kumar Ray as Forensic Expert
- Aritra Banerjee as Student In the Library

== Production ==
=== Development ===
In December 2014, director Sandip Ray revealed that the sequel of the reboot film Badshahi Angti (2014) will be based on Gangtokey Gondogol, and another sequel will be Nayan Rahasya if he finds an actor who is suitable for Jatayu's role. But in May, 2016 Sandip Ray cancelled the reboot series because Abir Chatterjee started a new version of film series of the Byomkesh franchise under Shree Venkatesh Films and Surinder Films. The other reason was the new Feluda movie Sandip Ray intended to make under a Mumbai-based production house Eros International, but Abir has a strict contract with Shree Venkatesh Films and Surinder Films. The cancellation of the reboot series Badshahi Angti is now considered a stand-alone reboot film.

It was declared by Sandip Ray instead of continuing the reboot series he will continue the previous Feluda film series after Royal Bengal Rahashya (2011) and Sabyasachi Chakrabarty will return as Feluda and Shaheb Bhattacharya will return as Topshe. There will be two stories in the new film and the film is named Double Feluda.This is a sequel of Royal Bengal Rahashya (2011) and the movie was released in December 2016. The movie will be a tribute to 50 years of Feluda. Sandip Ray said that there will be two stories in the film, Samaddarer Chabi and Golokdham Rahasya.

=== Casting ===
After Abir Chatterjee decided to opt for the role of Byomkesh Bakshi, Sandip Ray decided to cancel the reboot series because the director and many others were of the view that the same person doing both Feluda and Byomkesh Bakshi won't be accepted by the audience. Ray again proposed the role to Sabyasachi Chakraborty, who earlier proposed Ray take Abir Chatterjee for the role. Though initially reluctant, Chakraborty decided to accept the role since he can't reject Ray's proposal. Chakraborty has reportedly decided to look young to fit himself in the role. Along with Chakraborty, Saheb Bhattacharya also made a comeback with the role of Topshe. Ray also stated that his upcoming Feluda film would not star the character of Jatayu, since he couldn't find any suitable replacement for Bibhu Bhattacharya and it was a godsend that both the stories he decided to interwind to put into celluloid did not have the mention of the character. Apart from veterans Sabyasachi Chakraborty, Dhritiman Chatterjee, Paran Bandopadhyay, Bratya Basu, Rajesh Sharma (actor) and many more, Gaurav Chakraborty was announced to be part of the cast.

== Critical reception ==
The Times of India gave the film four stars out of five. BookMyShow rated the film 8.8 out of 10.

== See also ==
- Literary works of Satyajit Ray
- Feluda in film
