= Badshahi Angti (film) =

2014 film by Sandip Ray

- Theatrical release poster
- Directed by: Sandip Ray
- Written by: Satyajit Ray; Sandip Ray
- Based on: Badshahi Angti by Satyajit Ray
- Produced by: Shrikant Mohta; Mahendra Soni; Nispal Singh
- Starring: Abir Chatterjee; Sourav Das
- Cinematography: Sirsha Ray
- Edited by: Subroto Roy
- Music by: Sandip Ray
- Production companies: Shree Venkatesh Films; Surinder Films
- Release date: 19 December 2014
- Running time: 109 minutes
- Country: India
- Language: Bengali
- Box office: ₹4 crore

Badshahi Angti (transl. The Emperor's Ring) is a 2014 Indian Bengali-language thriller film directed by Sandip Ray, based on the novel of the same name by Satyajit Ray, starring Abir Chatterjee and Sourav Das as Feluda and Topse respectively. The film was released on 19 December 2014. It is the first film which stars Abir Chatterjee as Feluda. This was going to be a reboot to previous Feluda film series after Royal Bengal Rahashya. But in 2016 Sandip Ray cancelled the reboot series because Abir Chatterjee started a new version of film series based on Byomkesh Bakshi franchise under Shree Venkatesh Films and Surinder Films. The other reason was the new Feluda movie Sandip Ray intended to make under a Mumbai-based production house Eros International, but Abir has a strict contract with Shree Venkatesh Films and Surinder Films.

It was declared by Sandip Ray instead of continuing the reboot series he will continue the previous Feluda film series after Royal Bengal Rahashya (2011) and Sabyasachi Chakrabarty will return as Feluda and Shaheb Bhattacharya will return as Topshe. There will be two stories in the new film and the film is named Double Feluda. This is going to be a sequel of Royal Bengal Rahashya (2011) and the movie is a 50 years tribute to Feluda. For the cancellation of the reboot series Badshahi Angti is now considered as a stand-alone reboot film.

== Plot ==
Feluda and his cousin Topshe visit Lucknow with Topshe's father to spend the Puja vacation. They arrive at the house of Dhirendra Kumar Sanyal, a friend of Topshe's father. That evening Dr. Shrivastav also comes to Dhirendra Kumar Sanyal and tells him that last night, a thief tried to steal his 'Ring of Aurangzeb' (The Emperor's Ring) which was given to him by Pyarilaal Seth. After the incident Dr. Shrivastav is afraid and asks Dhirendra Kumar Sanyal to keep the ring safe. Sanyal agrees and keeps the ring at his home. But one day the ring goes missing from there. Then Feluda and Topshe start investigating, to find the culprit.

Meanwhile, Feluda meets an interesting person in the neighbourhood, Mr. Bonobihari Sarkar. Bonobihari babu has ferocious and poisonous creatures like crocodile, African tiger, hyena, rattlesnake, scorpion and black widow spider in his home. Feluda also meets Mahabir, late Pyarilal's son and a film actor who believes foul play is behind his father's death.

They travel to Lakshman Jhula Temple, Haridwar. Here, when Feluda lights his cigar near the banks of Ganga, Topse gets a glance of a shining object in Feluda's matchbox. He think that it may be the Emperor's Ring (Badshahi Angti). Later that night he asks Feluda about it when Feluda agrees that it was the ring. Next day when they move on to Lakshman Jhula the whole group gets divided into two and Feluda and Topse accompany Bonobiharibabu. The driver of their car was a servant of Bonobiharibabu, Ganesh Guho in Punjabi disguise. They trap Feluda and Topshe in a log house 1.5 miles from Lakshman Jhula. Their whole story is revealed by Feluda and it is also proved that Bonobihari babu is the culprit and also the murderer of Pyarilaal Seth. The film ends when Topshe regains his consciousness after the last scene climax and glances over Feluda wearing the Badshahi Angti.

== Cast ==
- Abir Chatterjee as Feluda
- Sourav Das as Topshe
- Paran Bandyopadhyay as Banbihari Sarkar
- Rajatava Dutta as Ganesh Guha (Cameo)
- Deepankar De as Binay Mitra/Topshe's father
- Biswajit Chakraborty as Dhirendra Kumar Sanyal
- Tathagata Mukherjee as Mahabir Seth
- Bharat Kaul as Dr. Shriwastav
- Dwijen Bandopadhyay as Bilashbabu/Inspector Gorgori
- Pradip Mukherjee as Ambika (Cameo)

== Production ==
=== Casting ===
Abir Chatterjee was cast as new Feluda and Saurav Das was cast as new Topshe in mid-2013. In an interview Sandip Ray said Abir Chatterjee was best fitted to be cast as Feluda.

=== Filming ===
Shooting begun from early 2014. 60% shooting was captured in Kolkata, and rest of the shooting was in Lucknow. In mid-2014, director Sandip Ray said "We will finish shooting by October and release the film in December."

== Release ==
As the earlier Feluda flicks, Badshahi Angti released on 19 December 2014 in West Bengal before the Christmas Eve; and released nationally on 2 January 2015.

=== Critical reception ===
The film received mostly positive reviews from critics. Shomini Sen of IBNLive gave it 3 star out of 5, and said: "Sandip Ray offers a genuine film which creates the same magic of Feluda in modern times". The Times of India gave it 3 and a half star out of 5.

=== Box office ===
The film collected ₹3.75 crore (US$390,000) in 3 weeks.

== Cancelled Sequels and return to the Previous Feluda Series ==
In December 2014, director Sandip Ray revealed, the sequel to this film will be based on Gangtokey Gondogol, and another sequel will be Nayan Rahasya if he finds an actor who is suitable for Jatayu's role. But in 2016 Sandip Ray cancelled the reboot series because Abir Chatterjee started a new version of film series based on Byomkesh Bakshi franchise under Shree Venkatesh Films and Surinder Films. The other reason was the new Feluda movie Sandip Ray intended to make under a Mumbai-based production house Eros International, but Abir has a strict contract with Shree Venkatesh Films and Surinder Films. For the cancellation of the reboot series Badshahi Angti is now considered as a stand-alone reboot film.

It was declared by Sandip Ray instead of continuing the reboot series he will continue the previous Feluda film series after Royal Bengal Rahashya (2011) and Sabyasachi Chakrabarty will return as Feluda and Shaheb Bhattacharya will return as Topshe. There will be two stories in the new film and the film is named Double Feluda. This is going to be a sequel of Royal Bengal Rahashya (2011) and the movie is heading for the Christmas release in December, 2016. Though Sabyasachi Chakrabarty is 60 years old, in Feluda film Feluda is 50 years old and Topshe is 30 years.

== New Reboot and Loose Sequel of Badshahi Angti ==
The 2022 Feluda film Hatyapuri worked as a second reboot after the first reboot film Badshahi Angti and also a loose sequel of Badshahi Angti. Indraneil Sengupta is the new Feluda after Abir Chatterjee.
