= Bombaiyer Bombete (film) =

2003 film by Sandip Ray

- DVD cover of Bombaiyer Bombete
- Directed by: Sandip Ray
- Written by: Satyajit Ray
- Produced by: Ushakiran Movies; D. Rama Naidu
- Starring: Sabyasachi Chakrabarty; Parambrata Chatterjee; Bibhu Bhattacharya; Ashish Vidyarthi; Rajatabha Dutta; Rajesh Sharma
- Music by: Sandip Ray
- Release date: 12 December 2003
- Running time: 115 minutes
- Country: India
- Language: Bengali
- Budget: ₹80 lakh
- Box office: ₹2 crore

Bombaiyer Bombetey (novel)
- Author: Satyajit Ray
- Cover artist: Satyajit Ray
- Language: Bengali
- Genre: Detective fiction
- Publisher: Ananda Publishers
- Publication date: 1976
- Publication place: India
- Media type: Print
- Preceded by: Ghurghutiya-r Ghatana
- Followed by: Gosaipur Sargaram

Bombaiyer Bombete (Bengali: বোম্বাইয়ের বোম্বেটে, lit. The Bandits of Bombay) is a 2003 Indian Bengali thriller film directed by Sandip Ray and based on the story of the same name by his father Satyajit Ray. It was the third big screen adaptation of the fictional detective character Feluda after 25 years of the second Feluda film Joi Baba Felunath (1979), which was directed by Satyajit Ray. It was the first big screen adaptation of the Feluda new film series (Continuation of the original series) though Sabyasachi played Feluda in all the ten TV films of Feluda TV film series (1996-2000) directed by Sandip Ray. The film was a sequel to the Doctor Munshir Diary, the last television film of Feluda TV film series (1996-2000), which was a sequel series to Satyajit Ray's Feluda film series (1974-1979).

Previously, Feluda was played by Soumitra Chatterjee in two films Sonar Kella (1974) and Joi Baba Felunath (1979), directed by Satyajit Ray. The first of the Feluda TV film series, Baksho Rahashya (1996), in which Sabyasachi Chakrabarty starred as Feluda for the first time, was released in theaters before the movie was released in 2001. Bombaiyer Bombete was the eleventh film of Sabyasachi Chakrabarty as Feluda. After the huge success of Bombaiyer Bombete, four sequels have been made till 2011. They are Kailashey Kelenkari (2007), Tintorettor Jishu (2008), Gorosthaney Sabdhan (2010) and Royal Bengal Rohosso (2011). A fifth sequel, titled Double Feluda, released in 2016.

== Plot ==
Lalmohan Ganguly, alias Jatayu − Friend of Feluda − gets invited to Mumbai (previously Bombay) to watch the shooting of a film based on a novel written by him, Bombaiyer Bombete. His old friend of Garpar road, Pulak Ghoshal (Paran Bandyopadhyay), is the director. Feluda and Topshe accompany him.

One day prior to the journey, a mysterious film producer named Sanyal visits Jatayu and conveys that he intends to make a film on the same novel on which Pulok Ghoshal is making a film. Jatayu tells him that the novel is sold, and thus Sanyal leaves. However, Sanyal requests him to handle a packet to one of his allies at the Mumbai airport, to which Jatayu agrees.

Once in Mumbai, a man comes to pick up the parcel (Rajatava Dutta), and by mistake, Jatayu gives him another parcel, which contained a copy of his novel. The man goes to a multistory building and gets attacked in the elevator by another man. He kills the assassin, and drops a piece of paper near the body. Feluda and team check in a hotel, where they are told by Pulak about the murder, and the trio meet inspector Patwardhan (Anjan Srivastav).

Inspector Patwardhan tells them that a necklace of Nana Sahib has been stolen from Nepal and that it may be smuggled in India by unknown smugglers. Next day at the beach, Feluda finds out through a newspaper clipping that the piece of paper contained Jatayu's description. The trio next meet the producer of the film Mr. Gorey (Ashish Vidyarthi). Pulak Ghoshal the director further introduces them to Victor Perumal (Rajesh Sharma), a martial artist from Japan, who is the stunt coordinator for the film.

Things turn mysterious when the trio get attacked multiple times by unknown men, forcing Feluda to open the brown packet of Sanyal after realizing Jatayu's parcel swap. He finds The Life Divine of Aurobindo Ghosh book inside, which makes him more puzzled. Further, it is revealed that in the novel, Jatayu mentioned a fictional building called the Shivaji Castle, which is the residence of the villain of his novel, but finds out that the building is there for real, and is the residence of Mr Gorey.

At the day of shoot, the trio board a train where an action sequence is being shot, and Sanyal shows up. Along with the mysterious man from the airport (called Nimmo) brandishing a gun, Sanyal asks Feluda to hand him the book, which he gladly does, but finds something missing there. It is now revealed that Nana Sahib's necklace was inside the book, and Sanyal is the kingpin of a smuggling mafia operating in Mumbai. Quite unexpectedly, Victor Perumal jumps down in the compartment causing Nimmo to lose balance and let go of his revolver. Sanyal is overpowered, and Feluda shoots Nimmo in the leg who tries to escape. It is now revealed that Sanyal is actually Gorey in makeup, and he is a real time smuggler who tried to smuggle the necklace with Jatayu's help. His men attacked them in order to get the parcel, and that Victor was instructed by Feluda to jump in their compartment if he sensed danger.

Everything ends well with Gorey being arrested and Pulok cheering Jatayu that the shooting will be resumed soon with a new producer on board.

== Cast ==
- Sabyasachi Chakrabarty as Prodosh Chandra Mitra aka Feluda
- Parambrata Chatterjee as Topshe
- Bibhu Bhattacharya as Lalmohan Ganguly
- Paran Bandyopadhyay As Pulak Ghoshal, Film Director
- Ashish Vidyarthi as Gopinath Gorey/Mr. Sanyal
- Rajatava Dutta as Nimmo
- Rajesh Sharma as Victor Perumal
- Joy Badlani as Shyam (Gorey's Assistant 1)
- Anjan Srivastav as ACP Patwardhan, Mumbai Police
- Mohan Sethi
- Shome Mukherjee as Mikki
- Masood Akhtar as Driver Swarup Lal Sharma
- Rana Mitra as Hari (Gorey's Assistant 2)
- Samir Mukherjee
- Shakeel Khan
- Arunabha Dutta
- Saroj Ray
- Chitrabhanu Basu
- Sumit Ganguly
- Narayan Kundu
- Prasanta Samanta

== Reception ==
Although the movie was a box office success, the movie was criticised for its making style. The storytelling of this movie weren't the same as the previous Feluda films and Feluda TV films. The previous movies had a classic style and tone of Feluda's world. But Bombaiyer Bombete was set into this world and present time. It doesn't have the classic style and tone of Feluda's world. The film received mixed reviews from critics and Feluda fans.

== See also ==
- Satyajit Ray
- Feluda
- Feluda in film
- Sandip Ray
- Sabyasachi Chakrabarty
- Parambrata Chatterjee
- Bibhu Bhattacharya
- Soumitra Chatterjee
