= Hatyapuri (film) =

2022 film by Sandip Ray

- Directed by: Sandip Ray
- Written by: Satyajit Ray; Sandip Ray
- Based on: Hatyapuri by Satyajit Ray
- Produced by: Anjan Ghoshal; Shyamsundar Dey
- Starring: Indraneil Sengupta; Ayush Das; Abhijit Guha; Paran Bandopadhyay; Saheb Chatterjee
- Cinematography: Shashanka Palit
- Edited by: Subrata Roy
- Music by: Sandip Ray
- Production companies: Ghosal Media; Shadow Films
- Release date: 23 December 2022
- Country: India
- Language: Bengali
- Box office: ₹2.56 crore

Hatyapuri is a 2022 Indian Bengali-language thriller film directed by Sandip Ray based on the novel of the same name by Satyajit Ray, which was originally published in 1979. The film stars Indraneil Sengupta as Feluda. The film worked as a second reboot after the first reboot film Badshahi Angti (2014) and also a loose sequel of Badshahi Angti. The movie was released theatrically on 23 December 2022. It was subsequently released online on 2 June 2023, on ZEE5. In May 2024, Nayan Rahasya was released as its sequel.

== Plot ==
The film revolves around a series of murders that take place in Puri, a coastal town of Odisha. Indraneil Sengupta plays the role of a detective who is called upon to solve the mysterious murders. As he delves deeper into the investigation, he uncovers a web of deceit, secrets, and conspiracies that lead him to the shocking truth behind the crimes.

== Cast ==
- Indraneil Sengupta as Feluda
- Ayush Das as Topshe
- Abhijit Guha (director) as Lalmohan Ganguly
- Paran Bandyopadhyay as Durgagati Sen
- Supriyo Dutta as Shyamlal Barik
- Saheb Chatterjee as Bilas Majumdar/ Animesh Kumar Sarkar
- Subhasish Mukherjee as Laxman Bhattacharya

== Production ==
The film was initially announced in December 2021. However the progress on it got stalled due to differences between director Sandip Ray and Shree Venkatesh Films, who were to produce the film. The row was over the casting of the lead actor. While director Sandip Ray's choice was Indraneil Sengupta, the producers wanted to cast Tota Roy Chowdhury. Subsequently, Ray opted for new producers. The shoots of Hatyapuri finally started in June 2022. The recce of the film was completed in April 2022. The film is mostly shot in Puri, Odisha and Kolkata.

== Release ==
=== Theatrical Release ===
The film was released on 23 December 2022.

=== Home Video ===
The streaming rights of the movie were sold to ZEE5. It was available for streaming worldwide on 2 June 2023.

== Marketing ==
The release date of the film was announced in November 2022. The teaser was launched on 15 November 2022. The trailer of the movie was released on 1 December 2022.

== Reception ==
=== Box office ===
Hatyapuri drew full houses across 130 screens on its release weekend. The film grossed ₹2.56 crore at the end of its theatrical run and emerged as one of the highest grossing Bengali films of 2022.

=== Critical reception ===
The movie received mostly positive reviews from both critics. The Times of India rated it 3 out of 5 and commented, With Hatyapuri, Ray gives us new hope for a modern Feluda. The Hindustan Times also rated it 3 out of 5 while hailing Indraneil Sengupta as the new Feluda. The Business Standard went on to call it one of the best adaptations of a Feluda story.

== Sequel ==
After the success of the film and for the child actor Abhinav Barua who played the small role Doomru in this film, director Sandip Ray announced in 2023 that he will adapt Nayan Rahasya novel of Feluda (series) as soon as possible. Because he thought this is the right age for Abhinav Barua to play the role of Nayan. Production completed in late 2023 and the film Nayan Rahasya released on 10 May 2024.
