= Maryada (1950 film) =

1950 Bengali film

- Directed by: Digambar Chattopadhyay
- Starring: Uttam Kumar; Pahari Sanyal; Kamal Mitra; Jiben Bose; Smritirekha Biswas; Nripati Chattopadhyay
- Production company: Bhabani Kalimandir Ltd
- Release date: 1950
- Language: Bengali

Maryada (transl. dignity) was a Bengali drama film directed by Digambar Chattopadhyay. This movie was released on 15 December 1950 under the banner of Bhabani Kalamandir Limited. This is the third and first movie of legendary Bengali actor Uttam Kumar and that Bibhu Bhattacharya appeared respectively. In this movie Uttam Kumar leaps on a song for the first time in his career.

== Cast ==
- Uttam Kumar
- Pahari Sanyal
- Kamal Mitra
- Jiben Bose
- Nripati Chattopadhyay
- Nabadwip Haldar
- Bibhu Bhattacharya
- Smriti Biswas
- Haridhan Mukhopadhyay
- Santosh Sinha
- Ashu Bose
