= Feluda: 50 Years of Ray's Detective =

Indian documentary film

Feluda: 50 Years of Ray's Detective is a Bengali documentary film directed and produced by Sagnik Chatterjee based on a fictional detective character created by Satyajit Ray This is the first biopic of India based on a fictional character. At first the film was premiered at the New York Indian Film Festival in 2017 and finally released on 7 June 2019. It received the award for Best Director in Non-Feature Film at the 66th National Film Awards in 2019.

== Synopsis ==
Feluda was created by Satyajit Ray. Felu alias Pradosh Chandra Mitter is one of the most popular fictional detective in India who turned 50 in the year 2017. The documentary contains literary references of Feluda films, interviews of onscreen Feluda and other characters. It also contains the history and chronology of the character and its creator Ray, rare audio clips, illustrations etc.

== Cast ==
- Soumitra Chatterjee
- Sandip Ray
- Sabyasachi Chakraborty
- Paran Bandopadhyay
- Saswata Chatterjee
- Abir Chatterjee
- Kushal Chakraborty
- Ritwick Chakraborty
