= Ghurghutiyar Ghatona =

Crime thriller short stories by Satyajit Ray

Ghurghutiar Ghotona (The Locked Chest)
- Author: Satyajit Ray
- Cover artist: Satyajit Ray
- Language: Bengali
- Genre: Detective fiction
- Publisher: Ananda Publishers
- Publication date: 1975
- Publication place: India
- Media type: Print
- Preceded by: Joi Baba Felunath
- Followed by: Bombaiyer Bombete

Ghurghutiyar Ghatona is one of the crime thriller short stories written by the Academy Award-winning filmmaker and author Satyajit Ray, featuring the popular Bengali sleuth Feluda. This is the twelfth Feluda story overall and is a part of the second 12-story collections of Ray "Aro Ek Dojon". It is one of the few Feluda stories which does not feature Lalmohan Ganguly (Jatayu).

== Plot ==
An old man named Kalikinkar Majumdar of Ghurghutia village near Palashi invites Feluda to his house to solve a puzzle. After some thinking, Feluda accepts the invitation.

A few days later, Feluda and his cousin Tapesh a.k.a. Topshe find themselves on the way towards Palashi. After arriving there, they meet with Kalikinkar's driver who takes the duo to Ghurghutiya. The house turns out to be in the middle of a big garden out in the rural areas of Palashi. Due to the absence of electricity, the entire house is dark, with lanterns kept here and there. The duo meet with Kalikinkar who turns out to be a 73-year-old bedridden man. After some initial conversation, Kalikinkar calls his servant Gokul to bring his pet parrot. The pet parrot knows a riddle:Trinayan, hey Trinayan, take some rest. Kalikinkar tasks Feluda with solving the riddle, which is apparently the combination used to open the iron chest which Kalikinkar has. Kalikinkar promises to give four rare books of Émile Gaboriau as reward if Feluda succeeds in solving the riddle. During this time, the duo meet another person named Rajen/Rajenbabu who looked after Kalikinkar's business activities, but his work is now reduced to buying books for Kalikinkar as Kalikinkar himself can't go out, as he has already survived a stroke.

Later that evening, the duo meet with Kalikinkar's son, Biswanath Majumdar. The three of them go to the dining hall to have dinner, during which Biswanath tells that he comes to Ghurghutiya for only a few days as he can't keep his business stalled for long. After dinner, the duo go to sleep. Feluda then deduces the meaning of the riddle said by the parrot. Using an old technique created and used by the British people during the British Raj in India, both Feluda and Topshe deduce the riddle:Trinayan, hey Trinayan, take some rest actually means: 39-0-39 8-2-0. The relieved Feluda now goes to sleep.

The next morning, after having tea, the duo meet with Kalikinkar, tell him the answer of the riddle, take Gaboriau's four books and leave the place. On the way, they learn that Biswanath has left early in the morning. The moment the duo arrive in the station, Feluda smells something fishy; he immediately goes to the local police station and with the police they return to Ghurghutiya. After arriving there, they come across a new car, which is undoubtedly Biswanath's car, thus revealing that Biswanath hasn't yet left the place. They find Kalikinkar gone, the iron chest open and empty and Gokul sobbing deeply. Feluda interrogates Gokul, while the police chase Biswanath. It's finally revealed that Kalikinkar is actually dead; Biswanath himself killed Kalikinkar during a heated argument and then, with his driver's help, disposed of his corpse in the lake behind the house. Gokul was forced to follow their orders in order to survive. It's also revealed that Rajenbabu is dead for two years.

After finally catching Biswanath, it's revealed that Biswanath (who is a failed actor) played the roles of three men: Kalikinkar, Rajenbabu and himself. The large house and the absence of electricity helped Biswanath to maintain this pretence. He actually wanted his father's wealth which was in the iron chest, but due to the fact that Kalikinkar never disclosed the combination number to him and that Kalikinkar had already invited Feluda to the house before being killed, Biswanath saw this as an opportunity to use his old make-up and acting skills to obtain the combination number from Feluda to steal the money. After explaining everything, Feluda pulls out the four books of Gaboriau and orders Topshe to keep them back in Kalikinkar's bookshelf as he has no wish of taking books from a dead man's collection. While returning the books, Topshe sees the parrot continuously saying the riddle to itself: Trinayan, hey Trinayan, take some rest. The story ends here.

== Other media ==
Ghurghutiyar Ghatona was filmed by Sandip Ray in 1999 as Satyajiter Goppo. Sabyasachi Chakrabarty, Saswata Chatterjee, Kharaj Mukherjee and Nimai Ghosh played the lead roles. In 2017, Parambrata Chatterjee directed a webseries titled "Feluda", which consisted of three seasons. The second season was a modern adaption of Ghurghutiyar Ghotona, and consisted of 4 episodes. Except for modernizing it, it also changed the story a lot, resulting in a new different story. In this adaption, Kalikinkar Majumdar (Biplab Dasgupta) is a scientist, who has made an invention, and Gokul (Sujan Mukherjee, secondary antagonist of this adaption, and the assistant of Biswanath Majumdar (Shatabdi Wadud), the main antagonist) and Rajen (Biplab Dasgupta) are his assistants. Parambrata Chatterjee plays Feluda and Riddhi Sen plays Topshe.
