= Chhinnamastar Abhishap =

1977 novel by Satyajit Ray

- Chhinamastar Abhishap book cover
- Author: Satyajit Ray
- Cover artist: Satyajit Ray
- Language: Bengali
- Genre: Detective fiction
- Publisher: Ananda Publishers
- Publication date: 1977
- Publication place: India
- Media type: Print
- Preceded by: Gorosthaney Sabdhan!
- Followed by: Hatyapuri

Chhinnamastar Abhishap (English title : The Curse of the Goddess) is a Bengali novel by Satyajit Ray featuring private detective Feluda. It was first serialized in Desh magazine in 1978, and then released in book form in 1981 by Ananda Publishers.

== Plot summary ==
Feluda, his cousin Topshe and Lalmohan Ganguly a.k.a. Jatayu decide to visit Hazaribagh, a town situated in Jharkhand (erstwhile Bihar), India. On their way, they meet a middle aged gentleman who introduces himself as Preetindra Choudhury working in an electronics company. He has a hobby of recording the sounds of various birds. His car began to malfunction, which is why he requests a lift to Hazaribagh. Later it's revealed that Preetindra is the youngest son of a retired-yet-famous advocate, Mahesh Choudhury.

On reaching Hazaribagh, they come to know that the tiger of the Great Majestic Circus, which was performing in the town, had escaped. The trio settle in the empty bungalow of one of Feluda's former clients. The bungalow is only a stone's throw distance away from Mahesh Choudhury's house. Feluda meets the owner of the circus company, Mr. Kutti as well as the first ring master of the escaped tiger, Karandikar, who blames the appointment of a second ring master, Chandran behind the tiger's escape. Preetindra, meanwhile, invites the trio to their home on occasion of their father Mahesh's birthday.

Next day, the trio go to Kailash, the home of Mahesh Choudhury and meet with him and his entire household. His household consists of his eldest son Arunendra Choudhury (who is a Kolkata-based businessman), his youngest son Preetindra Choudhury, Preetindra's wife Neelima Devi and their daughter Bibi, his friend Akhil Burman Chakraborty, and Shankarlal Misra. Feluda also learns that his second son, Beerendra went away from his home several years ago. Shankarlal was the son of his former watchman, Deendayal Misra who died mysteriously several years ago. Mahesh took pity on the orphaned Shankarlal and adopted him. Feluda also learns that Mahesh is fond of riddles and cryptic languages. The trio accompany the entire Choudhury family for a picnic to Rajrappa. At the picnic spot, Mahesh mysteriously becomes unconscious and falls on the ground. He is taken to his home, where he shows some cryptic signs to Feluda before dying that same evening.

Feluda asks Arunendra to give him Mahesh's diaries and postcards sent to him by Beerendra. Feluda learns from those diaries that though Mahesh was very gentle during his old age, he was a rather short-tempered man during his youth. Feluda tells Topshe and Jatayu that in the diary, Mahesh wanted to forget something by indulging in alcoholism. But he cannot figure out what it is. Later in the evening, Topshe and Jatayu go to the Great Majestic Circus, where Mr. Kutti tells them that Karandikar has disappeared from the circus last night. The duo then go out for a short trip outside Hazaribagh, when they come face-to-face with Sultan, the escaped tiger. They inform Feluda who in turn informs the Forest Department. Feluda informs them that Chandran tried but failed to capture the tiger after being injured by the tiger. Feluda tells them that Arunendra is an impulsive gambler who goes to the horse races, almost regularly.

While taking a walk after dinner, the trio meet Shankarlal, who unsuccessfully persuades them to stop the investigation, but when Feluda refuses to do so, Shankarlal hesitantly accepts. Feluda also learns from Shankarlal that Preetindra is actually an ordinary man, who works in some local company; he also reveals that Preetindra was previously an aspiring writer but that didn't work out. Feluda tells Topshe and Jatayu that Mahesh had a rare Gibbon's stamp catalog which has been stolen. Later in the night, someone breaks into the bungalow and unsuccessfully tries to attack Feluda, only to flee after Feluda overpowers him.

Next morning, Feluda goes to Kailash to return the diaries and postcards, where Neelima Devi hands a tape recorder to Feluda against Preetindra's wishes. Feluda soon learns that Sultan the tiger has been caught. He goes to the site along with Topshe and Jatayu and sees Karandikar capturing the tiger. Arunendra was also present there with a gun, in case the tiger does anything wrong. They come to Kailash, where Feluda tells Arunendra that Beerendra is actually present in Hazaribagh and that Mahesh had seen him. Arunendra is surprised to hear this. Feluda tells him that during his youth, Mahesh had murdered his watchman Deendayal, because Deendayal had killed his favourite dog, an Irish Terrier. Arunendra witnessed this, but maintained silence. But, when he understood that Mahesh is planning to change his will and remove him from it because of his gambling, Arunendra reminded Mahesh of his crime, which caused Mahesh to collapse and to suffer the heart attack which caused his demise. Feluda tells him that he had learnt all of this through the tape recorder given to him by Neelima Devi. Feluda also explains that it was Arunendra who appointed a servant of the house to attack Feluda and that he's the one who stole the Gibbon's stamp catalog.

Later, Shankarlal brings Karandikar with him. Feluda reveals that Karandikar is actually Beerendra Choudhury, Mahesh's second son. Feluda explains that Beerendra never went to abroad. The postcards which he sent to his father was actually sent by Akhil's son, who works in abroad. Beerendra and Akhil's son are best friends. Feluda gives him a portrait (handed to him by the dying Mahesh), where he opens secret compartment and offers him some rare stamps hidden there by Mahesh because he feared that the catalog may get stolen. On his deathbed, Mahesh cryptically instructed Feluda to give this portrait to Beerendra. When Beerendra politely refuses, Feluda tells him that he will sell the stamps and will send the money to Beerendra; Beerendra accepts this. Later that evening, the trio go to the Great Majestic Circus to see Beerendra/Karandikar performing with Sultan the tiger in front of everyone; after paying one last visit to Beerendra and Mr. Kutti, the trio leaves.

== Characters ==
- Pradosh Chandra Mitter a.k.a. Feluda, a private investigator.
- Tapesh Ranjan Mitter a.k.a. Topshe, Feluda's young assistant and cousin.
- Lalmohan Ganguly a.k.a. Jatayu, a bumbling crime fiction writer.
- Haripada Dutta, Jatayu's driver.
- Mahesh Choudhury, the family patriarch.
- Arunendra Choudhury, Mahesh's eldest son.
- Beerendra Choudhry a.k.a. Karandikar, Mahesh's second son and the ringmaster of Great Majestic Circus.
- Preetindra Choudhury, Mahesh's youngest son.
- Neelima Devi, Preetindra's wife.
- Bibi, daughter of Preetindra and Neelima Devi and Mahesh's granddaughter.
- Mr. Kutti, owner of Great Majestic Circus.
- Chandran, the second ringmaster of the Circus.
- Noor Muhammad and Jagat SIngh, servants of Choudhury family.
- Akhil Burman Chakroborty, a retired astrologer and Mahesh's old friend.
- Shankarlal Misra, an adopted member of the Choudhury family, the only son of Deendayal Misra, Mahesh's (now deceased) former watchman.

== Adaptations ==
Sunday Suspense adapted this novel in 2016, with Sabyasachi Chakrabarty voicing Feluda, RJ Deep voicing Topshe, Jagannath Basu voicing Jatayu, and RJ Mir, RJ Somak, RJ Agni, and various other artists taking part in various roles.

A webseries named "Chinnomastar Obhishap" directed by Srijit Mukherjee is based on the same story.
