= Nayan Rahasya =

2024 Bengali film

- Nayan Rahasya film poster
- Directed by: Sandip Ray
- Written by: Satyajit Ray; Sandip Ray
- Based on: Nayan Rahasya by Satyajit Ray
- Produced by: Nispal Singh; Surinder Singh
- Starring: Indraneil Sengupta; Abhijit Guha; Ayush Das; Abhinav Barua; Mohan Agashe
- Cinematography: Sashanka Palit
- Edited by: Subrata Roy
- Music by: Sandip Ray
- Production company: Surinder Films
- Release date: 10 May 2024
- Country: India
- Language: Bengali

Nayan Rahasya (transl: The Mystery of Nayan) is the 2024 Bengali mystery thriller film directed by Sandip Ray based on the same name novel of Feluda series by Satyajit Ray. The film is the sequel of 2022 Feluda film Hatyapuri and the second film of the second reboot of the film series. This film was released on 10 May 2024 under the banner of Surinder Films.

== Plot ==
Magician Mr Tarafdar finds a boy with exceptional numerical abilities and takes him to Chennai for his show. Feluda is asked to ensure the boy's safety and he gets involved in a subsequent murder case of Mr Hingorani.

== Cast ==
- Indraneil Sengupta as Pradosh Chandra Mitra aka Feluda
- Abhijit Guha as Lalmohan Ganguly aka Jatayu
- Ayush Das as Tapesh Ranjan Mitra aka Topshe
- Abhinav Barua as Nayan Sarkar aka "Jyotishka"
- Mohan Agashe as Mahesh Hingorani
- Supriyo Dutta as Taraknath Thakur aka TNT
- Biswajit Chakraborty as Nandalal Basak
- Rajesh Sharma as a detective from Detecnique
- Bharat Kaul as Henry Hodgson
- Punya Darshan Gupta as Devkinandan Tiwari
- Atmadeep Ghosh as Shankar Hublikar
- Debnath Chatterjee as Sunil Tarafdar
- Carl A. Harte as Sam Kellarman
- Subhrajit Dutta as Asim Sarkar, Nayan's father

== Reviews ==
Poorna Banerjee of The Times of India wrote "Just like Hatyapuri, the modernisation of Feluda doesn’t go much beyond cell phone upgrades, it seems, and that is perhaps the weakness of the plot. But the film is well-shot and the narrative is fast, especially in the first half. Despite the weaknesses in the script as well as sub-par editing (especially in the second half), Nayan Rahasya is a nice, family-friendly adventure, thanks to good performances". Agnivo Niyogi of The Telegraph wrote "What works in favour of Nayan Rahasya is the fact that Sandip Ray leans on showing more of Feluda’s sleuthing skills than putting him in action scenes, unlike in his earlier films. A few tweaks to the characterisation helps. Feluda now uses a mobile phone and Jatayu’s iconic Ambassador has been replaced by a hatchback but in the original green".
