= Hatyapuri =

1979 novel by Satyajit Ray

Hatyapuri (The House Of Death)
- Hatyapuri book cover.
- Author: Satyajit Ray
- Language: Bengali
- Genre: Detective short story
- Publisher: Ananda Publishers
- Publication date: 1979
- Publication place: India
- Media type: Print
- Preceded by: Chhinnamastar Abhishap
- Followed by: Golokdham Rahasya

Hatyapuri (English title : The House Of Death) is a crime novel by Satyajit Ray. It gets its title from Puri, a city located on the shores of the Bay of Bengal which is a popular tourist attraction in East India. It was first serialized in the Sandesh magazine in 1979 and released in book form in the same year by Ananda Publishers.

== Plot ==
Disturbed by the heat and humidity of Calcutta in June, (combined with frequent electricity failures) the "Three Musketeers", Pradosh C. Mitter (Feluda), Topshe, and Lalmohan Ganguly (Jatayu) go to Puri for vacation. There they stay in Neelachal Hotel, owned by Lalmohan Babu's landlord's classmate, Shyamlal Barik. In the evening, while strolling on the beach, the trio spot odd footprints on the sand. Later, Lalmohan Babu goes to meet an astrologer, Laxman Bhattacharya, who is presumably gifted with extrasensory perception . Laxman lives in a building called "Sagarika" owned by an elusive man known as D. G. Sen. In the hotel, Shyamlal informs them that Sen's main interest is in collecting manuscripts.

Next morning, while strolling on the beach, Topshe and Lalmohan Babu stumble upon a dead body lying on the beach, later revealed to be Rupchand Singh. They tell the news to Feluda, who in turn informs the police. He tells the two of them that he has fixed an appointment with D.G. Sen. While going to Sagarika, they find Inspector Mahapatra, with whom Feluda was acquainted from a previous case. After conversing with Mahapatra regarding the victim Singh—who had come to Puri from Nepal and had been shot dead, but the weapon hasn't been found—the "Three Musketeers" then go to Sagarika and meet Nisith Bose, D.G. Sen's secretary.

Nisith reveals his employer's full name: Durga Gati Sen who is currently suffering from gout. They meet Mr. Sen in the terrace of his house, who shows them many manuscripts, of which the most famous and the oldest ones are the Ashtadashasahasrika Pragya Paramita and Kalpasutra. He also tells them that he doesn't sell these manuscripts. While roaming on the beach, the trio meet a man named Bilas Majumdar, who introduces himself as a famous wildlife photographer. They come back to the hotel, where Bilas tells them his story.

Eight months ago, Bilas and Mr. Sen had gone to Nepal, where Bilas had a photography session. One morning they went to a forest where Bilas was taking photos of orchids. There he met with a serious accident but he cannot remember what it was. Fortunately, he survived. After telling his story, Lalmohan Babu advises him to consult Laxman Bhattacharya, the astrologer. They agree to consult Laxman the next evening.

Next evening, Feluda, Topshe, and Lalmohan Babu take a trip around Puri. On the way, they meet Inspector Mahapatra. He tells him that Rupchand Singh arrived yesterday in Puri. Then the trio and Bilash Majumdar go to the astrologer's house. There Laxam tells him that Bilas's accident was actually a murder attempt on him. Then, the four of them go to the Railway Hotel to have dinner, where Lalmohan Babu tells somebody to meet Mr. Sen tomorrow. While returning to the hotel, they meet Mahesh Hingorani, who had travelled with them to Puri in the same train. Hingorani tells them that he had offered Sen 25,000 rupees for the Pragya Paramita but Sen refused. Hingorani then walks off in disgust.

Next morning the trio go to the Puri railway station to buy a newspaper where they meet Nisith Bose. He tells them that a man had come today at Mr. Sen's house. On seeing the man, Mr. Sen told him to leave at once. Feluda assumes that the man was Bilas. Nisith then hurriedly leaves the station. The trio come to the hotel to find Bilas waiting for them. He tells them that he had gone to Mr. Sen's home. Mr. Sen seemed to recognize him and then told him to go back. He tells them that next day, he is leaving Puri. Bilas leaves them, while Topshe and Lalmohan Babu go to Bhubaneshwar. They return to Puri in the evening, only to find that Feluda had gone out. They wait for him but soon become restless. They go out in search for him. Suddenly, Lalmohan Babu stumbles on something, revealed to be the unconscious and wounded Feluda. They help him to his feet and escort him back to the hotel. In the hotel, Shyamlal brings in a man, who introduces himself as Mahim Sen, Mr. Sen's son. Mahim Sen tells them that he had come to Puri to meet his father. Feluda tells him that one of the most valuable manuscripts from Mr. Sen's collection has gone missing and also the secretary, Nisith is missing. When Mahim leaves, Feluda tells Topshe that Nisith took all his bedding with him but left his wallet in his room.

Next morning, the trio go to a house named "Bhujanga Niwas", which is near Sagarika. Inside the house, Lalmohan Babu finds Nisith's corpse. He had been beaten to death by a blunt instrument. Feluda tells Topshe and Lalmohan Babu that tonight, they have to keep a vigil in front of Sagarika. In the night, after a thrilling climax, Feluda catches the culprits: Bilas Majumdar and Laxman Bhattacharya.

Feluda gathers everyone in Bhujanga Niwas and tells everyone that Bilas Majumdar is actually Mr. A. Sarkar, a smuggler by profession. Feluda tells them that the actual Bilas Majumdar had died three weeks ago in a hospital in Nepal. Feluda explains that Sarkar had actually attempted to murder Mr. Sen in Nepal. Rupchand Singh, the driver of the car Sarkar was in, started blackmailing him, so Sarkar killed Singh. Sarkar came to Puri and when he saw D.G. Sen here, he conspired with Laxman to steal the manuscripts. Nisith had actually discovered the theft and tracked Laxman to Bhujanga Niwas, so Laxman killed him with the hard manuscript and later threw the manuscript into the sea. Before throwing it into the sea, Laxman saw Feluda and attacked him with the blood-soaked manuscript. Tonight they were planning to commit another robbery, but they got caught. Feluda returns the Pragya Paramita to Mr. Sen and tells him that he retrieved it from the Nulias who found it from the sea. Inspector Mahapatra arrests the culprits.

Next morning, the trio go to Sagarika, where Feluda tells Mr. Sen that he was the one who was roaming in the beach with his walking stick and was leaving those odd footprints. He actually didn't suffer from gout. Mr. Sen then exposes his wooden leg, which was the result of Sarkar's murder attempt on him.

== Characters ==
- Pradosh Chandra Mitter a.k.a. Feluda, a private investigator.
- Tapesh Ranjan Mitra a.k.a. Topshe, Feluda's assistant and cousin.
- Lalmohan Ganguly a.k.a. Jatayu, a bumbling crime fiction writer.
- Durga Gati Sen a.k.a. D. G. Sen, a manuscript collector.
- Mahim Sen, son of D.G. Sen.
- Bilas Majumdar a.k.a. Mr. A. Sarkar, a self-proclaimed "wildlife photographer" who's actually a smuggler.
- Laxman Bhattacharya, a fake astrologer and Sarkar's partner-in-crime.
- Inspector Mahapatra, the officer in-charge of the case.
- Shyamlal Barik, manager of Neelachal Hotel.
- Mahesh Hingorani a.k.a. M.L. Hingorani, a businessman.
- Srinivas Som, Jatayu's roommate.
- Haripada Dutta, Jatayu's driver.
- Nisith Bose, D. G. Sen's secretary.

== Adaptation ==
Sunday Suspense, a Bengali audio program on Mirchi Bangla, adapted this novel in 2017, with Sabyasachi Chakraborty voicing Feluda, RJ Somak voicing Topshe, Jaganath Basu voicing Lalmohan Ganguly, with RJ Deep, RJ Mir Afsar Ali, and others voicing various characters.

A film, titled Hatyapuri, under the banner of Shadow Films was released on 23 December 2022. The film is directed by Sandip Ray and stars Indraneil Sengupta as Feluda alongside Ayush Roy and Avijit Guha as Topshe and Jatayu respectively.
