= Bibhu Bhattacharya =

Indian film actor (1944–2011)

- Born: 17 September 1944; Jharia, Bihar, British India (now Jharia, Dhanbad, Jharkhand)
- Died: 22 September 2011 (aged 67); Howrah, India
- Occupation: Actor
- Known for: Playing Lalmohan Ganguly (a novelist with pen-name 'Jatayu') in Feluda films

Bibhu Bhattacharya (17 September 1944 – 23 September 2011) was an Indian actor who primarily appeared in Bengali TV and films. He was born in Jharia, Bihar, British India (now Jharia, Jharkhand, India). He gained prominence and became a household name only in 1998 as Jatayu (Lalmohan Ganguly) in Sandip Ray’s Feluda, based on stories by his late father, maestro Satyajit Ray. In 2011, he died of Cardiac arrest in Howrah, West Bengal.

== Acting career ==
Bibhu Bhattacharya never attended any school. He was acting in studios, when other boys of his age were studying. At the age of four-and-a-half he started acting in a film called Maryada, starring Uttam Kumar.

He was called Master Bibhu, one of the most prominent child actors in Bengali films and very popular with actors like Jahar Ganguly and Chhabi Biswas. He played the title role in the movie Prahlad (1952) and did movies like Bindur Chhele (1952), Dhruba (1953), Rani Rashmoni (1955) and Dui Bon (1955). After he became a teenager, he could no longer be a child actor and offers began to dry up. His last film as a child actor was Sagar Sangame (1959). Then, he didn’t get another film for almost 38 years. In between, he kept himself busy with theater and TV serials.

== Feluda series ==
It was only in 1998 that he got the dream role of Jatayu. His first film as Jatayu was Jahangirer Shornomudra (1999) and he also acted as Jatayu in Bombaiyer Bombete (2003), Kailashey Kelenkari (2007), Tintorettor Jishu (2007), Gorosthaney Sabdhan (2010) and Royal Bengal Rahasya (2011). He was legendary in his performance and managed to capture in essence the spirit of the character so well that even Sandip Ray, the director, found him perfect as a replacement. He had completed dubbing for the Feluda film Royal Bengal Rahasya the day before he died. Initially, it was difficult to replace the legendary actor, Santosh Dutta as Jatayu, but he became popular with time.

== Death ==
On 23 September 2011, Bhattacharya died at the age of 67 after suffering a sudden heart attack at his residence on Kedar Bhattacharjee Road. He reportedly became unwell at midnight and collapsed at home.

== Filmography ==
- Macho Mustanaa (2012)
- Bhooter Bhabishyat (2012)
- Aalo Chhaya (2012)
- Royal Bengal Rahasya (Feluda theatrical film) (2011) as Jatayu (Lalmohan Ganguly)
- Tenida (2011)
- Gorosthaney Sabdhan (Feluda theatrical film) (2010) as Jatayu (Lalmohan Ganguly)
- Bela Sheshe (2009)
- Mallick Bari (2009)
- Swartha (2009)
- Tintorettor Jishu (Feluda theatrical film) (2008) as Jatayu (Lalmohan Ganguly)
- Abelay Garam Bhaat (2008)
- Kailashey Kelenkari (Feluda theatrical film) (2007) as Jatayu (Lalmohan Ganguly)
- Bombaiyer Bombete (Feluda theatrical film) (2003) as Jatayu (Lalmohan Ganguly)
- Satyajiter Priyo Golpo (Dr Munshir Diary For ETV Bangla) (Feluda TV film) (2000) as Jatayu (Lalmohan Ganguly)
- Satyajiter Goppo (Jahangirer Swarnamudra, Ghurghutiyar Ghotona, Golapi Mukto Rahashya, Ambar Sen Antardhan Rahashya for DD Bangla) (Feluda TV films) (1999) as Jatayu (Lalmohan Ganguly)
- Sagar Sangamey (1959)
- Swapnapuri (1959)
- Thakur Haridas (1959)
- Purir Mandir (1958)
- Sree Sree Maa (1958)
- Harishchandra (1957)
- Janmatithi (1957)
- Khela Bhangar Khela (1957)
- Omkarer Joyjatra (1957)
- Mamlar Phal (1956)
- Putrabadhu (1956)
- Bir Hambir (1955)
- Dui Bon (1955)
- Jharer Pare (1955)
- Prashna (1955)
- Rani Rasmani (1955)
- Srikrishna Sudama (1955)
- Agnipariksha (1954)
- Bakul (1954)
- Ladies Seat (1954)
- Nababidhan (1954)
- Prafulla (1954)
- Dhruba (1953)
- Sitar Patal Prabesh (1953)
- Aandhi (1952)
- Bindur Chhele (1952)
- Bishwamitra (1952)
- Nildarpan (1952)
- Pallisamaj (1952)
- Prahlad (1952)
- Sahasa (1952)
- Bhakta Raghunath (1951)
- Kulhara (1951)
- Pratyabartan (1951)
- Maryada (1950)

== Feluda Series TV films ==
- Jahangirer Swarnamudra (1998)
- Ambar Sen Antordhan Rahashya (1998)
- Golapi Mukta Rahashaya (1998)
- Dr. Munshir Diary (2000)

== See also ==
- Satyajit Ray
- Literary works of Satyajit Ray
- Sandip Ray
- Santosh Dutta
- Feluda
- Jatayu (Lalmohan Ganguly)
- Feluda in film
- Professor Shonku
- Tarini khuro
- Tarini Khuro in other media
- Culture of Bengal
- Culture of West Bengal
