= Kissa Kathmandu Mein =

Hindi tele series

- Based on: Jato Kando Kathmandute by Satyajit Ray
- Directed by: Sandip Ray
- Starring: See below
- Original language: Hindi

Original release
- Network: DD National
- Release: 1986 – 1987

Kissa Kathmandu Mein (The Episode of Kathmandu) is a Hindi Mini-television series directed by Sandip Ray based on the Feluda story of Satyajit Ray, Jato Kando Kathmandute. This series was published in 1986-87 by DD National.

== Plot ==
Feluda finds a fake medicine racket is operating from Nepal. He goes to Nepal with Jatayu and Topse to catch a murderer, and discovers the case to be far more complicating than it seems. While investigating, Jatayu gets drugged and Feluda meets Maganlal Meghraj, the head of the gang in Kathmandu.

== Cast ==
- Shashi Kapoor as Pradosh C. Mitter aka Feluda
- Mohan Agashe as Lalmohan Garg (based on Lalmohan Ganguly)
- Utpal Dutt as Maganlal Meghraj
- Master Alankar Joshi as Topshe
- Moon Moon Sen as Ms. Sinha in a cameo appearance
- Pankaj Kapur as Rajendra Sharma / Jagdish (based on Anantlal Batra/ Jagdish)
- Iftekhar as Harinath Choudhary
- Shayamanand Jalan as Dr Diwakar
- Bhishma Guhathakurta as Anikedra Bhatia (based on Anikedra Shom)
