= Tintorettor Jishu (novel) =

1983 novel by Satyajit Ray

- First edition
- Author: Satyajit Ray
- Language: Bengali
- Series: Feluda
- Genre: Detective fiction
- Publisher: Ananda Publishers
- Publication place: India

Tintorettor Jishu (Tintoretto's Jesus) is a mystery novel by Satyajit Ray about an adventure of Feluda. A movie directed by Sandip Ray has been made based on the story (released in December 2008). An extensive shoot schedule at Hong Kong during May 2008 takes Feluda movies to a new height. The book was published by Ananda Publishers in 1983.

== Plot summary ==
A famous painting by the Italian maestro Tintoretto is gifted to the Neogi family by the aristocratic Italian Cassini family. However, not everyone is aware of the value of the painting. One of the family members steals it, and international buyers are interested in it. Feluda chases the criminals all the way to Hong Kong. There was a surprise waiting for him there. Eventually, Feluda (with the help of a relative stranger, who turns out to be a Neogi family member) succeeds in solving the mystery.

=== True incidence behind this story ===
This is related to an actual story of a Miniature Italian painting, belonging to the aristocratic Neogi family, Rajas of Baikunthapur, now Aloya in the district of Tangail, presently in Bangladesh. Satyajit Ray was a close friend of Kumar Sudhanshu Mohan Neogi, of the same family and drew inspiration of this novel from this painting, its theft and subsequent recovery from Dhaka and its eventual auction to help the family buy property in Calcutta (now Kolkata).

=== Feluda and the former Maharajas ===
The native princes play an interesting part in the history of British India. Though under the protection of the British Raj, they had a certain amount of power within their domain. Apart from patronizing cricket in India, many of them were involved in promoting social and cultural activities in India.

In Tintorettor Jishu we meet the (fictional) former Maharaja of Bhagwanagarh, Mr Bhudev Singh. Another former Maharaja Suraj Singh appears in Golapi Mukta Rahasya. The young prince of Rupnaryangarh plays an important role in Ebar Kando Kedarnathe. However, the Maharajas and the princes are more prominent in the Tarini Khuro series, another creation of Satyajit Ray.

== Adaptation ==
A film in the same name based on this novel was released in 2008, directed by Sandip Ray.
