= Jahangirer Swarnamudra =

Detective story by Satyajit Ray

Jahangirer Swarnamudra (The Gold Coins of Jahangir) is a Bengali detective story written by Satyajit Ray. It stars his famous character Feluda. The story was first published in 1983 in Sandesh.

== Plot synopsis ==
The trio of Feluda, Jatayu and Tapesh has been invited to Panihati to investigate the case of a missing gold coin of Jahangir. The client, Shankar Prasad Mitra, had a collection of twelve gold coins but on his last birthday, one of them was stolen by one of his most trusted guests. He invites the same group of people to his next birthday celebration and asks Feluda to catch the culprit while hiding his true identity.

== Films ==
A movie, Jahangirer Swarnamudra was made for TV in 1998 produced by Angel Television, directed by Sandip Ray and starring Sabyasachi Chakrabarty as Feluda, Bibhu Bhattacharya as Jatayu, Saswata Chatterjee as Topshe and Ranjit Mallick as Shankar Prasad Mitra.
