= Kailashey Kelenkari (novel) =

1974 novel by Satyajit Ray

Kailashey Kelenkari (A Killer In Kailash)
- Author: Satyajit Ray
- Cover artist: Satyajit Ray
- Language: Bengali
- Genre: Detective fiction
- Publisher: Ananda Publishers
- Publication date: 1974
- Publication place: India
- Preceded by: Samaddarer Chabi
- Followed by: Royal Bengal Rahashya

Kailashey Kelengkari (transl. A Killer in Kailash) is a 1974 mystery novel by Indian writer Satyajit Ray featuring the private detective Feluda. It is the 9th Feluda story, preceded by Samaddarer Chabi and followed by Royal Bengal Rahashya.

== Plot summary ==
Super Sleuth Feluda goes after a gang of smugglers who steal and smuggle out a valuable Yakshi head—the country's valuable treasure, the unique stone figures that adorn ancient temples of India. In the bait, he has to take up multiple disguises, and encounter many shady characters, all in the land of Kailash Temple in Ellora. He does however get a little help from his able assistant & cousin Topshe and best friend Lalmohan Ganguly.

== Adaptation ==
The novel was adapted into a film of the same name in 2007 based on the same plot and was directed by the author's son, Sandip Ray.
