= Lalmohan Ganguly =

Fictional character

Lalmohan Ganguly Jatayu
- Feluda character
- First appearance: Sonar Kella(1971)
- Last appearance: "Robertsoner Ruby" (1991)
- Created by: Satyajit Ray
- Portrayed by: Santosh Dutta; Rabi Ghosh; Anup Kumar; Bibhu Bhattacharya; Anirban Chakrabarti; Abhijit Guha

In-universe information
- Alias: Jatayu; Lalmohan Garg (in Kissa Kathmandu Mein)
- Gender: Male
- Title: Ganguly
- Occupation: Writer
- Relatives: Lalitmohan Ganguly (Great grandfather); Pyaricharan Ganguly (Grandfather); Mohinimohan Ganguly (Uncle); Durgamohan Ganguly (Uncle)
- Religion: Hinduism
- Nationality: Indian
- Born: Sarbogya Gongopadhyay; 1936
- Residence: Garpar, Kolkata
- Alma mater: Athenium Institution
- Friends: Feluda; Topshe
- Car: Green Ambassador
- Driver: Haripada Babu
- Height: 5 ft 3.5 in (1.61 m)(in Sonar Kella book) 5 ft 4 in (1.63 m)(in Royal Bengal Rahasya book) 5 ft 5 in (1.65 m)(in Joi Baba Felunath film)

Lalmohan Ganguly, alias Jatayu (Bengali: জটায়ু) is a fictional character in the Feluda stories written by Satyajit Ray. He writes pulp crime thrillers, but is quite weak and nervous in real life. He is fairly wealthy due to the immense sales of his books. He writes at a frequency of two books a year. His crime fiction stories have interesting and catchy names, often characterised by alliterations like 'Sahara-ey Shiharan (Shivers of Sahara)', 'Honduras-e Hahakar (Shouts at Honduras)', 'Borneo-r Bibhishika (Terror of Borneo)', 'Durdharsh Dushman (Fatal Antagonist)', 'Vancouver-er Vampire (Vampire of Vancouver)', 'Himalaye Hritkampo (Heart Vibration of Himalay)', 'Atlantic-er Atanka (Fright of Atlantic)', 'Anobik Danob (Atomic Monster)', 'Naroker Naam Karakoram (KArakoram is the Name of Hell)', 'Bidghute Bodmash (Weird Villain)', 'Arokto Arab (Bloody Arab)' etc. The names of several Feluda stories also exhibit this feature, for example Joto Kando Kathmandute, Gangtokey Gondogol, Royal Bengal Rahasya, Robertsoner Ruby, Gosainpur Sargaram, Bombaiyer Bombete, Gorosthaney Sabdhan!, Kailashey Kelenkari, Bhuswargo Bhayankar, etc. The detective of Jatayu's novel, Prakhar Rudra, is a character with incredible intellect and power. Lalmohan's grandfather gave his name "Sarbogya Gongopadhyay" but Lalmohan does not use that name. In the Hindi Telefilm Kissa Kathmandu Mein, his name was Lalmohan Garg (not Ganguly, probably so that the viewers understand).

== Overview ==
He first meets Feluda in the story Sonar Kella (The Golden Fortress) and from then on he accompanies Feluda and Topshe on all their major adventures. He collects weapons but is often reluctant to use them. Weapons collected by him during different adventures include boomerang, Kukri (knife), smoke bomb and even a Pestle etc. His whole demeanour is of hilarity and he regularly provides the comic relief in Feluda stories. He has a history with the villain Maganlal Meghraj who had a circus performer throw knives at him in Joi Baba Felunath (The Mystery of the Elephant God) and fed him the drug LSD in Jato Kando Kathmandutey (The Criminals of Kathmandu). The last time Jatayu met Meghraj was at Golapi Mukta Rahasya.

Though in the Feluda adventures his activities invoke quite an amount of comedy, his character is far from a typical comic relief. Rather he often epitomizes an average Bengali person. However, Jatayu's qualities also improve with time and with his association with Feluda gradually making him more knowledgeable, smart and intelligent.

In the movie version (not in the original story) of the first story, Sonar Kella, the criminal Mandar Bose escapes due to the folly of Jatayu. But in the later stories (Joy Baba Felunath, for example) we find Jatayu being of great help to Feluda in his work. In a lot of stories, he is seen to suggest important clues mostly unintentionally which is of great help in the investigation. In "Sonar Kella" (movie) he uttered "sonar pathorbati" (a Bengali phrase used to describe something practically impossible) but that immediately enlightened Feluda and he got his most necessary clue to ultimately solve the case. In ''Gorosthan e sabdhan", his prized possession of an antique repeater(watch) is used tactfully by Feluda to apprehend the culprits. In a number of stories, he actively took part as the saviour when the sleuth (and all three of them) are cornered helplessly by antagonists. e.g.- in "Baksho Rahasya", his timely use of the boomerang subdues Prabir, the antagonist and in " Tintorettor Jishu" he picks up a wooden box and successfully delivers a blow to a goon's head to knock him unconscious. He even interrogated the suspects as a proxy of Feluda in "Apsara theatre er mamla".

Jatayu is a fan of Baikuntha Mallick, a teacher in Athenaeum Institution, Kolkata, who is also a poet. Jatayu often recites his poems, which are also a source of comedy due to their peculiarity. Jatayu walks two miles daily to keep fit and refers to encyclopaedias for writing novels. He is a bachelor and owns three houses. He loves travelling.

'Jayatu Jatayu!' a book written by Shuvadip Adhikari is a compendium of facts on Jatayu. All the facts mentioned in the stories of Feluda are compiled in a single volume.

In the Hindi Telefilm Kissa Kathmandu Mein, his name was Lalmohan Garg (not Ganguly, probably so that the viewers understand).

== Characterization ==
In the first two movies on Feluda, the character of Jatayu was played by eminent actor cum advocate Santosh Dutta, and due to his performance, Satyajit Ray's later stories on Feluda had Jatayu adapting himself to the looks and mannerisms of Santosh Dutta. Veteran actor Rabi Ghosh played the role in the telefilm Baksho Rohoshyo, while Anup Kumar was Jatayu in the telefilm Bosepukure Khunkharapi. Bombaiyer Bombete, Kailashey Kelenkari & Tintorettor Jishu saw Jatayu being played by Bibhu Bhattacharya. Mohan Agashe played Jatayu (Jatayu's original name was Lalmohan Garg here) in Kissa Kathmandu Mein, in Hindi TV series Satyajit Ray Presents. In the 2020 web series Feludar Pherot, Anirban Chakrabarti essayed the role.
