= Kailashey Kelenkari (film) =

2007 Indian film by Sandip Ray

- DVD cover of movie
- Directed by: Sandip Ray
- Written by: Satyajit Ray
- Based on: Kailashey Kelenkari by Satyajit Ray
- Produced by: Indranil Sen; Mou Raychowdhury; Sumita Bhattacharyay
- Starring: Sabyasachi Chakrabarty; Parambrata Chatterjee
- Music by: Sandip Ray
- Release date: 21 December 2007
- Country: India
- Language: Bengali
- Budget: 1 crore
- Box office: 2 crore

Kailashey Kelenkari (Bengali: কৈলাসে কেলেঙ্কারি, also spelled Koilashe Kelenkaari) is an Indian Bengali thriller film directed by Sandip Ray based on the novel of the same name by Satyajit Ray. The film was released on 21 December 2007. Satyajit Ray visited the famous Ellora Caves near Aurangabad around 1940−41. Ray was so fascinated with the beauty of the Kailash Temple and the caves that he was inspired by it when he penned his crime thriller Kailashe Kelenkari. It is the second film of the New Feluda franchise as well as the sequel of Bombaiyer Bombete.

== Synopsis ==
The story revolves around the blatant smuggling and illegal trading in ancient sculptures across the country. Detective Feluda steps in to solve the crime and nab the culprits. His cousin Topshe, and Lalmohanbabu, the writer of detective novels who goes by the name of Jatayu, assist him in his work. The story revolves around the theft of the head of Yakshi from the Bhuvaneshwar temple. The novel depicts how Feluda uses Topshe and Jatayu as baits in the fifteenth cave and manages to catch the main villain of the piece − Mr Rakshit, alias Chattaraj in a series of scenes filled with action and high dramatics.

== Cast ==
- Sabyasachi Chakrabarty as Feluda
- Parambrata Chatterjee as Topshe
- Bibhu Bhattacharya as Jatayu
- Deepankar De as Mr. Chattoraj alias Rakshit
- Biplab Chatterjee as Jayanta Mullick
- Haradhan Bandopadhyay as Sidhu Jyatha
- Tom Alter as Sol Silverstein
- Ardhendu Banerjee as Professor Subhankar Bose
- J. Brandon Hill as Sam Lewson
- Pradip Bhattacharya as hotel manager.
- Sudip Mukhopadhyay in a cameo role
- Tota Roychowdhury in a cameo role
- Achintya Dutta as village elder
- Nitya Ganguly as teashop owner
- Joydip Mukherjee as ironic fight director Apparao
