= Bhuswargo Bhayankar =

1987 novel by Satyajit Ray

Bhuswargo Bhayankar ( Peril in Paradise )
- Author: Satyajit Ray
- Translator: Gopa Majumdar
- Language: Bengali
- Genre: Detective fiction
- Publisher: Ananda Publishers
- Publication date: 1987
- Publication place: India
- Pages: 25

Bhuswargo Bhayankar is a short novel by Satyajit Ray featuring the private detective Feluda, published in 1987.

== Plot summary ==
In this case, Feluda, Topshe and Jatayu go to Srinagar and Kashmir where they come across a spine chilling mystery. They meet a retired judge, Siddheshwar Mallick, and his group who have also come for a holiday. They travel together to Gulmarg, Khilanmarg and Pahalgam. The judge has given the death sentence to many convicts in a career spanning three decades and wants to find out whether he had made a mistake in doing so by calling the spirits of those convicts by planchette. The judge suffers from angina due to which he had to voluntarily retire at the age of 65 and he has a son, who is addicted to gambling. He finds out that he had misjudged two of his cases, one of a Bihari and another of a Kashmiri. In the meanwhile, there are life attempts on the judge's son Vijay and on Feluda twice. Soon after, during Pahalgam visit, the judge gets murdered and a precious diamond ring worn on his right hand gets stolen. Feluda reveals that the life attempt on Vijay was by the judge's bearer, Prayag, who is revealed to be the father of one of the innocent convicts and the murder was committed by two people, the judge's son, Vijay who had huge debts upon him, and one of the people who had joined the holidaying group, who is revealed to be the son of Manohar Sapru, another one of the innocent convicts.

== Film ==
Director Srijit Mukherji announced that a mystery thriller web series is on the way based on the story named Bhuswargo Bhoyonkar (Feludar Goyendagiri season 2). The shooting was finished in January 2023. That has released in Hoichoi OTT. Tota Roy Chowdhury will play the role of Feluda, Anirban Chakrabarty as Jatayu and Kalpan Mitra as Topse. Riddhi Sen acted in the role of the judge's private secretary.

The film adds a narrative of violence and instability in Kashmir, with a foregrounding technique involving a narrated tale of political instability in Kashmir centred around elections. This narrative, though absent in the source text, was used as a cinematic filler.
