= Badshahi Angti (novel) =

1969 novel by Satyajit Ray

Badshahi Angti (The Emperor's Ring)
- Badshahi Angti book cover
- Author: Satyajit Ray
- Cover artist: Satyajit Ray
- Language: Bengali
- Genre: Detective fiction
- Published: 1969 (Ananda Publishers)
- Publication place: India
- Media type: Print
- Preceded by: Feludar Goendagiri
- Followed by: Kailash Chowdhuryr Pathor

Badshahi Angti (English title: The Emperor's Ring) is a novel by Satyajit Ray featuring the private detective Feluda. It was first serialized in Sandesh magazine in the year 1966–67. It was then released in book form in 1969 by Ananda Publishers. This is the first Feluda novel created by Satyajit Ray.

== Plot outline ==
Feluda, now working for a bank, along with Topshe and Topshe's father decide to visit Dhirendra Kumar Sanyal (or Dhiru Kaka, as called by Topshe), who lives in Lucknow. They reach Dhiru Kaka's house. In the evening, while having tea, they have a visitor named Dr. Srivastav, who is an osteopath and a good friend of Dhiru Kaka. Dr. Srivastav tells Dhiru Kaka that last night a daku (dacoit) had broken into his house. He believes that the dacoit must have come to rob a precious ring given to him by Pyarelal Seth, because he had saved the life of his only son. He further tells that when Pyarelal had his second heart attack, Pyarelal murmured "a spy", before ultimately dying. Dr. Srivastav tells that robberies do not happen much in his neighborhood due to the presence of Bonobihari Sarkar, who owns a private menagerie with a variety of poisonous animals. Dhiru Kaka tells Feluda that the ring once belonged to the Mughal emperor Aurangzeb. Dhiru Kaka offers to keep the ring with him. Later, when Dr. Srivastav leaves the house, Feluda sees a car following the doctor's car. Feluda tells Topshe that somebody had been listening to their conservation, because Feluda finds a half-burnt cigarette in the garden.

Next day, Feluda, Topshe, his father and Dhiru Kaka go to the Imambara. There, they find Bonobihari Sarkar, who invites them to his private zoo. In the Bhoolbhulaia (The Labyrinth), Feluda keeps close to the walls. In the roof of the Imambara, they find a man introduced by Dhiru Kaka as Mahavir Seth, Pyarelal's son. In the evening, they come to Bonobihari's house and see his private zoo, especially three of the most poisonous creatures - a rattlesnake, a blue scorpion and a Black Widow Spider. There they meet Bonobihari's assistant, Ganesh Guha. They also learn that Bonobihari knows about the ring. When they came back to Dhiru Kaka's house, his servant informs him that a sadhu baba had been waiting for him. Panic-stricken, Dhiru Kaka rushes to the cupboard where he kept the ring, only to find it gone. Feluda and Topshe rush out to find the sadhu baba, but to no success. While coming back to the house, someone throws a rolled up paper on Feluda, who ultimately fails to catch the person.

Feluda later tells Topshe that the paper warns Feluda to stop investigating. He also learns from Dr. Srivastav that Mahavir is an actor. Feluda also shows a tin of toothpowder to Topshe; upon Topshe's enquiry, Feluda tells that it is Churnikrito Brahmastra. That night, someone tries to knock Feluda and Topshe unconscious by using chloroform, but fails as they both manage to awaken and save themselves. The next day, Dhiru Kaka informs Inspector Gargari of the robbery. After lunch, Bonobihari visits them and invites Feluda and Topshe to the Residency. While going to the Residency, Feluda informs Bonobihari about "the spy" which was spoken by Pyarelal. In the Residency, someone tries to attack Feluda and Bonobihari with stones.

Next day, Feluda and Topshe travel to Hazratganj, where they meet Mahavir in a book store. They go to a coffee shop where Mahavir discloses to Feluda that his father used to get palpitations whenever he used to see any insect. He says that on the day of his father's death, his bearer tells that he had shouted very loudly. Mahavir believes that there is foul play is behind his father's death. They also meet Ganesh who tells that he has left Bonobihari's job and will return to Kolkata. Ganesh also warns Feluda that Bonobihari is not a very good man. Next day, Feluda, Topshe, Topshe's father, Bonobihari, and Dr. Srivastav travel to Haridwar by the Doon Express. Before going to Haridwar, Feluda goes back to the Bhoolbhulaia.

In the train, Bonobihari questions Dr. Srivastav about Pyarelal. Dr. Srivastav realizes that Bonobihari is suspecting him of the robbery. Feluda tells that Dr. Srivastav is not the thief. In Hardoi station, while drinking tea, someone throws a paper at Feluda's direction. The paper contains the same warning - Be Careful. Next morning, they reach Haridwar. After reaching the dharamshala, Feluda and Topshe travel to Har-ki-Pauri. While Feluda was lighting a cigarette, Topshe sees something shining; when questioned, Feluda says it is nothing but phosphorus. Topshe is not convinced. After returning to the dharamshala, they find Bonobihari talking with another Bengali man, Bilash Babu, who claims to be an astrologer.

Later in the night, Feluda reveals to Topshe that he was the one who took the ring. He tells that there was someone who wanted to take the ring and that he wanted to catch him. Thus he hid the ring in one of the passages of the Bhoolbhulaia. Before coming to Haridwar, he returned to Bhoolbhulaia to retrieve the ring. Next morning, they travel to Laxmanjhoola. Feluda, Topshe and Bonobihari travel in one taxi, while Topshe's father, Dr. Srivastav and Bilash Babu travel in another taxi. Topshe sees that a sadhu baba, who was following them from Lucknow, passed the taxi. Bonobihari tells the driver to go down the forest on one side because he had news that there was a 12-foot python. They reach a loghouse.

In the loghouse, Bonobihari asks Feluda to give him the ring. Bonobihari tells them that he recorded what they had talked last night. When Feluda enquires why, Bonobihari tells that he had bought the ring from Pyarelal. Feluda tells that it never happened. What happened was this - Bonobihari wanted to take the ring, but Pyarelal did not want to part with it. So on the day of Pyarelal's death, Bonobihari took his dangerous Black Widow Spider and showed it to Pyarelal. Since Pyarelal had palpitations by seeing insects, he got a heart attack and died. Feluda reveals that the "spy" which Pyarelal uttered at the time of his death meant "spider", and his assistant Ganesh was following Dr. Srivastav from day one. Ganesh was the one who threw warnings to Feluda and he was the one who threw stones at them at the Residency. The driver who was traveling with them today was also Ganesh. Angry, Bonobihari calls Ganesh and tells him to leave the rattlesnake in the loghouse, while they will be escaping. Feluda throws the tin of toothpowder, which contained black pepper powder. Subdued, both Bonobihari and Ganesh fall down the house. Feluda kills the snake, and Topshe falls unconscious. Ganesh tries to escape but is shot by the sadhu, who's actually Mahavir in disguise. Bilash Babu, who's actually Inspector Gorgori, arrests Bonobihari and Ganesh. Topshe regains consciousness and sees Feluda wearing the emperor Aurangzeb's ring.

== Characters ==
- Pradosh Chandra Mitter a.k.a. Feluda
- Tapesh Ranjan Mitter a.k.a. Topshe
- Topshe's father
- Dhirendra Kumar Sanyal
- Dr. Srivastav
- Bonobihari Sarkar
- Ganesh Guha
- Pyarelal Seth
- Mahavir Seth
- Inspector Gargari

== Adaptation ==
Badshahi Angti adapted into film in 2014. In this film actor Abir Chatterjee playing Feluda's character for first time.
