= Feludar Goendagiri =

Short story by Satyajit Ray

"Feludar Goendagiri (Danger In Darjeeling)"
- Short story by Satyajit Ray
- First page of Feludar Goendagiri, published in Sandesh magazine.
- Original title: Feludar Goendagiri
- Country: India
- Language: Bengali
- Genre: Detective short story

Publication
- Published in: Sandesh magazine
- Publication type: Periodical
- Publisher: Ananda Publishers
- Media type: Print
- Publication date: 1965–1966

Chronology
—	Badshahi Angti

Feludar Goendagiri (English title: Danger in Darjeeling) is a short story written by Satyajit Ray featuring private detective Feluda. It was the very first among the total 35 complete stories/novels of Feluda series. The story first appeared in 1965 in the children's magazine Sandesh. This story introduced Feluda and his cousin Tapesh alias Topshe. Topshe is the narrator of all the 35 stories/novels.

== Summary of Feludar Goendagiri or The Mask ==
Rajen Babu, a respectable elderly gentleman, living in Darjeeling receives a threatening letter. Feluda, a private detective, and his cousin, Topshe, who are holidaying in Darjeeling, visit Rajen Babu to solve the mystery. After initial investigations, they suspect one of three men to be responsible for sending the letter. First, is Dr Phoni Mitra, who is Rajen Babu's physician. Since he does not have a flourishing practice and is in need of money, Feluda thinks that if Rajen Babu falls ill after receiving such threatening letters, it will help Dr Mitra make more money. Feluda also suspects Mr Ghoshal, who is an expert in antiques. Rajen Babu has recently developed a keen interest regarding antiques and has started collecting curios. Hence, he is a competitor of sorts for Mr Ghoshal. If he falls ill, he will not be able to go out of the house to buy the curios and thus Mr Ghoshal will be able to buy them. Prabeer Majumdar, Rajen Babu's son, whom Rajen Babu had thrown out of his house many years ago, after he had been caught stealing money from his father's cupboard, has also been seen in Darjeeling. He can also send the threatening letters to take revenge on his father.

One morning, Rajen Babu asks Feluda and Topshe to urgently visit him. When they reach, they see that Rajen Babu is looking pale and exhausted; Dr Mitra is examining him and Tinkori Babu, his tenant, standing there, looking worried. Rajen Babu tells Feluda that he has received a scare the previous night when a masked man had come in after midnight and bent over him. The man was a horribly scary mask and Rajen Babu had been petrified.

After seeing off Dr Mitra, Tinkori Babu informs Feluda that he has to urgently leave for Calcutta. He shows his concern for Rajen Babu by saying that he will inform the police before he leaves, as Rajen Babu needed protection. With Tinkori Babu leaving for Calcutta, Rajen Babu would be all alone at home. Hence, Feluda offers to stay the night at his residence.

At night, Feluda and Topshe discuss the details of the case. Feluda tells Topshe that all the three suspects, namely Dr Mitra, Mr Ghoshal and Prabeer, had alibis for the other night when Rajen Babu had had a scare, as they were with other people at the time of the incident. Suddenly, Feluda gets up and leaves and Topshe lies down. He soon begins to feel sleepy and is startled when he senses the presence of a masked man bending over him. He is about to scream when Feluda reveals that he has put on the mask. Feluda asks Topshe to wear the mask and to tell him if he finds anything odd about it. Topshe identifies the smell of cheroot. Immediately, Topshe thinks of Tinkori Babu and Feluda agrees with him.

However, they are confused about what could have been Tinkori Babu's motive. They get to know the motive only next morning, when Rajen Babu receives a letter from Tinkori Babu. In the letter, Tinkori Babu says that he had done it to avenge a wrong that Rajen Babu had done to him when they had studied in school together. Rajen Babu's act had scarred him deeply, both physically and mentally. When he saw Rajen Babu's picture at his house, he recognised him and decided to avenge himself by causing him to be anxious and lose his peace of mind.

The story creates an atmosphere of suspense and fear at the very outset with the mention of the threatening letter, which promises to punish Rajen Babu for past misdeeds. The reader is left wondering about what could have been the misdeed, and how and what punishment Rajen Babu will receive. As all the characters are introduced, the culprit is introduced as the least suspicious character but he is also shown to be intelligent. He tries to lead suspicion away from him by directing it towards Mr Ghoshal and also by saying that he will tell the police to take care of Rajen Babu, before leaving. This makes the story interesting as he is capable of matching wits with Feluda. The reader's attention is drawn towards the different characters by revealing the motives each of them could have. The reader focuses on these clues and may miss out the obvious detail that it was easiest for the culprit because of his close proximity to Rajen Babu, since he was staying at Rajen Babu's house. He came to Rajen babu's house and seen his childhood photograph and wanted to avenge the wrong done to him by Rajen.

== Commentary ==
In this story, Feluda's age is 27, and Topshe's is exactly half of Feluda's at 13 and a half.

This is the first of two stories of Feluda, that are set in Darjeeling. The other is Darjeeling Jomjomaat.

Sandip Ray mentions Darjeeling as one of the favourite locations of his father, and thus Satyajit Ray's first movie made from original written screenplay, Kanchenjungha, as well as the first Feluda novel was based out of Darjeeling.

== Publication history ==
1. Sandesh, (serialised) December 1965, January–February 1966.
2. Ek Dojon Goppo, part of a collection of 12 stories, June 1970, Ananda Publishers
3. Paharey Feluda, anthology, January 1996, Ananda Publishers
4. Feluda Somogro, anthology, January 2005, Ananda Publishers, ISBN 81-7756-480-3
