= Desh (magazine) =

Bengali biweekly literary magazine

- Cover of the March 17, 2016, issue
- Editor: Jayashree Roy
- Categories: Art, culture, literature
- Frequency: 26 issues/year
- First issue: November 24, 1933; 92 years ago
- Company: ABP Group
- Country: India
- Based in: Kolkata
- Language: Bengali
- Website: desh.co.in

Desh (Bengali: দেশ) (Note: The word "desh" refers to one's native country or place of origin; a homeland, home.) is a Bengali literary magazine featuring short stories, novels, commentary, criticism, poetry, essays, and book reviews. Launched on November 24, 1933, first as a weekly and later as a biweekly, it is one of India's oldest magazines. Throughout the 20th and 21st centuries, the magazine published works of prominent Bengali writers including Rabindranath Tagore, Jibanananda Das, Sunil Gangopadhyay, Satyajit Ray, Shirshendu Mukhopadhyay, and Joy Goswami.

A 2008 study by Dr. Chaitali Dutta in the Kolkata metropolitan area found that Desh was more popular among female readers, while males favored Saptahik Bartaman.

== History ==
The first editor of Desh was Satyendranath Majumdar (1891–1954), followed by Bankimchandra Sen. Sagarmoy Ghosh joined the magazine in 1939 and became its editor in 1976. Under his leadership, Desh emerged as India’s foremost literary magazine in a regional language. His first major achievement was securing a poem and short story—Sheth Katha (The Last Story)—from Rabindranath Tagore.

Ghosh made Desh a hub for Bengal’s top writers while also making room for new talents. He stood firm against political pressure, notably when Bangladesh temporarily banned the magazine after Nirad C. Chaudhuri referred to it as "so-called Bangladesh" in an article. In 1997, he stepped down as editor due to health issues related to old age. Journalist and Ramon Magsaysay award winner Amitabha Chowdhury took over for a year. During this period, Desh transitioned from a purely literary magazine to one that also featured non-fiction essays on current affairs, history, and culture. In 1998, Harsha Dutta succeeded him. The magazine is currently edited by Jayashree Roy.

== Sister-publication ==
Desh also publishes Boier Desh, a quarterly supplement launched in 2003. It features book reviews in Bengali and English by renowned critics and includes interviews with prominent literary figures from Bengal and beyond.

== Publication ==
Desh is published by the media conglomerate ABP Group on the 2nd and 17th of each month from 6 Prafulla Sarkar Street, Kolkata 700001. Its official website, www.desh.co.in, was launched on April 25, 2015. As of 2024, it's been moved to a subfolder under the Aaro Ananda application.

== Legacy ==
Desh is widely regarded as the leading literary magazine among Bengali-speaking intellectuals. Dubbed as "The New Yorker of Bengal," it has featured works by nearly every major figure in Bengali literature. Its annual Puja issue remains a major literary event. Desh celebrated its 90th anniversary in 2023.

== In popular culture ==
In Jhumpa Lahiri’s 2003 novel The Namesake, Ashima Ganguli, newly immigrated from Kolkata to Cambridge, rereads a worn-out copy of Desh she has read many times before. She can't bring herself to throw it away because its Bengali print gives her "perpetual comfort."

== Controversies ==
Desh has faced multiple controversies. In 1994, its Durga Puja issue featured a cover by Arpita Singh depicting the goddess Durga in a white saree, brandishing a revolver over a prostrate politician. The image provoked immediate outrage among local politicians, who demanded the magazine be withdrawn and all copies destroyed.

== Notable contributors ==
- Rabindranath Tagore
- Satyajit Ray
- Jibanananda Das
- Adwaita Mallabarman
- Syed Mujtaba Ali
- Jasimuddin
- Sunil Gangopadhyay
- Dinesh Das
- Alokeranjan Dasgupta
- Joy Goswami
- Shirshendu Mukhopadhyay
- Sankarlal Bhattacharya
- Sanjib Chattopadhyay
- Shakti Chattopadhyay
- Subhash Mukhopadhyay (poet)
- Shankha Ghosh
- Nabaneeta Dev Sen
- Harsha Dutta
- Samaresh Majumdar
- Anil Ghorai
- Anita Agnihotri
- Bani Basu
- Dibyendu Palit

== Official Webpage ==
Desh Magazine
