= Gangtokey Gondogol =

Feluda series short novel written by Satyajit Roy

- Gangtokey Gondogol book cover.
- Author: Satyajit Ray
- Original title: Gangtokey Gondogol
- Cover artist: Satyajit Ray
- Language: Bengali
- Genre: Detective fiction
- Published: 1971 (Ananda Publishers)
- Publication place: India
- Media type: Print
- Preceded by: Sheyal Debota Rahasya
- Followed by: Sonar Kella

Gangtokey Gondogol (Trouble in Gangtok) is a short novel by Satyajit Ray featuring the private detective Feluda. This story was first published in the Desh magazine in 1970 and then published in book form in 1971 by Ananda Publishers.

== Plot ==
Feluda and Topshe travel to Gangtok for their summer holidays at the start of the Bengali new year. While eating breakfast at the Bagdogra Airport, they meet a man named Sasadhar Bose, who works for a chemical firm dealing with aromatic perfumes. He tells that he had attended a nephew's wedding in Ghatshila and had come to visit Sikkim. While stopping at a place called Teesta Bazaar, the duo learn of an accident which occurred on the North Sikkim Highway; a taxi had fallen off a cliff, after being hit by a huge boulder, with the driver managing to escape, unhurt. Feluda and Topshe are staying at Hotel Snow View while Bose is staying at the dak bungalow.

In the evening, Bose comes to Feluda's hotel and informs him that the man who fell down the cliff in the accident, was his partner Shivkumar Shelvankar, who was also the owner of the company. Bose leaves the hotel to find a flight to Bombay the next day. Feluda meets another Bengali in the hotel, Nishikanto Sarkar. He reveals that he had a statue of a Tibetan God named Yamantak, which had nine heads and 34 hands. He says that he had sold the statue to Shelvankar for ₹1,000. While walking on the road, they meet a German hippie, Helmut Ungar, who tells them more about Shelvankar. He tells them that he had a son, whom he loved, but the son ran away from his father. Helmut tells Feluda that on the day of the accident, Shelvankar and he had decided to travel to a gumpa on the way to Singik. But Helmut had changed his mind and left early to take some photographs. He reveals to Feluda that Shelvankar used to keep the statue with him in his breast pocket as he considered it to be a lucky charm. But after the accident, the statue is nowhere to be found. Helmut also tells that the reason of this superstition is because of the advice of a certain Dr. Vaidya.

Later in the evening, Feluda and Topshe go to the Tibetan Institute to learn more of the statue. Feluda asks the driver of the taxi he is travelling in, to come in the morning the next day because he wants to see the scene of the accident. They reach the Tibetan Institute, where the curator declares that the Yamantak which Shelvankar had would actually cost a little more than ₹10,000. He also informs them that another person other than Shelvankar and Feluda came to inquire about the statue but couldn't remember exactly who it was. Feluda returns to the hotel to find Bose waiting for him. Bose tells Feluda that tomorrow he will be leaving for Bombay. Later Nishikanto tells Feluda that there is a lama dance the next day at Rumtek and they decide to go and see it in the afternoon.

Next day, Nishikanto tells Feluda that someone threw a threat note in his room. The paper consisted of a Tibetan word, which simply meant death. Later Feluda and Topshe travel to the accident site, where Feluda finds a white button. He also reveals that someone had tried to make the boulder fall by using a strong rod and that this accident is actually a well-planned murder. Feluda sends a telegram to Bose asking him to return to Gangtok. Nishikanto, Helmut, Feluda and Topshe travel to Rumtek for seeing the lama dance later that day. Feluda learns, through a telegram, that Shelvankar's estranged son is present in a Sikkim monastery and a detective agency has found him. Then, Feluda hears someone shouting. He and Topshe come to the source of the sound and find Nishikanto being pushed down the cliff. They rescue him and return to Gangtok. On the way back they make a stop at the dak bungalow, where Helmut is staying. There they meet a strange looking man, introduced by Helmut as Dr. Vaidya.

Dr. Vaidya, who specializes in talking to souls of the departed, tells all of them (through Shelvankar's spirit) that he was murdered and Virendra is responsible for it. Helmut tells that Virendra is Shelvankar's only son. Dr. Vaidya tells Feluda that tomorrow he will be traveling to Pemayangtse. Next morning, Topshe finds a small note near Feluda's ashtray. The note consisted of the same Tibetan word, meaning death. Feluda tells Topshe that today he will conduct an experiment on the North Sikkim Highway. After conducting the experiment, Feluda concludes that the murder was done by first hitting Shelvankar with a rod and then throwing the vehicle down the cliff. Then, a boulder was thrown to make it look like an accident. The driver was bribed. While Feluda was telling this, a boulder comes crashing down. Topshe saves Feluda from being crushed to death.

In the evening, Helmut comes to Feluda's room and shows him two photographs taken during the crime. It shows a man wearing red clothes standing on top of the mountain and seeing the car falling down. When Feluda says whether the red-clothes man is Virendra, Helmut tells that it is impossible and reveals himself to be Virendra. He tells Feluda and Topshe that he did not like his father marrying twice and thus ran away from home, after which his father approached the detective agency to find him. Then Helmut/Virendra came to Sikkim. Helmut/Virendra tells Feluda that he suspects Dr. Vaidya of being the murderer. They decide to travel to Pemayangtse to apprehend Dr. Vaidya. They pull in Nishikanto also. Next day, while travelling to Pemayangtse, Bose also follows them and requests them to take him also. They reach there in the evening. There they find that Dr. Vaidya is not there but he had left his stick in the dak bungalow.

Feluda then announces that Sasadhar Bose is the killer. He killed Shelvankar to take over the ownership of the company. When Bose said that he had gone to attend his nephew's wedding during the murder, Feluda reminds him that in the Bengali calendar no wedding is held during the last month, i.e., Choitro since it is an inauspicious month and that they had come together to Sikkim during the starting of the month of Baishakh, the first month of the Bengali calendar. Feluda tells that that Bose and Dr. Vaidya are the same person. Dr. Vaidya told Shelvankar of his own life and impressed him. While going to the gumpa, Dr. Vaidya and Shelvankar travelled in the same car. Then Dr. Vaidya/Bose hit Shelvankar with a rod and murdered him. Then he came back to Kolkata. Then as Sasadhar Bose, he travelled in the same plane with Feluda. Dr. Vaidya tried to pin the blame on Virendra, without knowing that Helmut was actually Virendra. When he saw that Feluda was conducting an investigation, he tried to kill Feluda, as well. Feluda also announces that Nishikanto wanted to steal the statue of Yamantak from Shelvankar as he didn't know the true value of the statue before selling it and later came to know about it through the Tibetan Institute. He then went to the site after the murder to find the statue, only for Bose to see him and start harassing him. Bose tries to flee but trips and gets pinned down by leeches. Feluda finds the statue in Bose's belongings. Bose is arrested and Feluda's investigation comes to an end.

== Characters ==
- Prodosh Chandra Mitter a.k.a. Feluda, a private investigator.
- Tapesh Ranjan Mitter a.k.a. Topshe, Feluda's young cousin/assistant.
- Sasadhar Bose/Dr. Vaidya, the criminal.
- Nishikanto Sarkar.
- Helmut Ungar/Virendra Shelvankar, Shivkumar's only son, a photographer.
- Shivkumar Shelvankar, the owner of an aromatic perfume company and Sasadhar's partner.
- The curator of the Tibetan Institute.

== Adaptation ==
Director Sandip Ray revealed, the sequel to Badshahi Angti will be based on Gangtokey Gondogol. But the plan was shelved.

This story was adapted by Sunday Suspense, a Bengali radio programme, where Sabyasachi Chakraborty played the role of Feluda, while Topshe was played by RJ Deep. Various other roles were played by RJ Mir, RJ Pushpal and other artists.

The story has been adapted into a Zee5 OTT web series named “Shabash Feluda”, released in May 2023, where Parambrata Chatterjee plays Feluda and Ritabrata Mukherjee plays as Topshe.
