= Royal Bengal Rahashya (novel) =

1974 novel by Satyajit Ray

Royal Bengal Rahasya (The Royal Bengal Mystery)
- First edition
- Author: Satyajit Ray
- Cover artist: Satyajit Ray
- Language: Bengali
- Genre: Detective fiction
- Publisher: Ananda Publishers
- Publication date: 1974
- Publication place: India
- Media type: Print
- Preceded by: Kailashey Kelenkari
- Followed by: Joi Baba Felunath

Royal Bengal Rahashya is a novel in Feluda Series created by the eminent author and director Satyajit Ray. It is of 88 pages and is published by Ananda Publishers Pvt. Ltd. in 1975. It was preceded by Kailashey Kelenkari and followed by Joi Baba Felunath.

== Plot summary ==
On an invitation by Mahitosh Singha Ray, Lalmohon Babu takes Feluda and Topshe to a forest near Bhutan where Feluda is given a puzzle to solve. He solves that successfully, unearths hidden secrets of the Sinha Ray family, solves a murder and kills a man-eating tiger in the process. At the end of the story, he is rewarded with the Tiger-skin. This story tells about Feluda 's impressive reflex skills and his spear sharp mind with its unbeatable craze for mysteries.

== Adaptations ==
- A film with same name based on this novel was released in 2011, directed by Sandip Ray.
- The story adapted into 2013 short film Feluda, directed by Shailesh Singh.
