= Tintorettor Jishu (film) =

2008 Indian Bengali film

- Poster of Tintorettor Jishu
- Directed by: Sandip Ray
- Written by: Satyajit Ray
- Based on: Tintorettor Jishu by Satyajit Ray
- Produced by: T Sarkar Productions
- Starring: Sabyasachi Chakrabarty; Parambrata Chatterjee; Bibhu Bhattacharya
- Cinematography: Barun Raha; Sasanka Palit
- Edited by: Subroto Ray
- Music by: Sandip Ray
- Release date: 12 December 2008
- Running time: 100 minutes
- Country: India
- Language: Bengali

Tintorettor Jishu (lit. 'Tintoretto's Jesus') is a 2008 Indian Bengali thriller film directed by Sandip Ray based on the story of the same name by Satyajit Ray. It is the third film of the New Feluda Franchise, as well as the sequel of Kailashey Kelenkari (2007). Sagar Bhowmik, a Bengali painter painted the depiction of Tintoretto's Jesus used in the film.

== Plot ==
The Niyogi family have a famous painting by the Italian master Tintoretto. However, not everyone is aware of the value of the painting. One of the family members steals it, and international buyers are interested in it. Feluda chases the criminals all the way to Hong Kong. There was a surprise waiting for him there. Eventually, Feluda (with the help of a relative stranger) succeeds in solving the mystery.

== Cast ==
- Sabyasachi Chakrabarty as Feluda
- Parambrata Chatterjee as Topshe
- Bibhu Bhattacharya as Jatayu
- Syed Hasan Imam as Soumya Neogi
- Tota Roy Chowdhury as Robin/Rajsekhar Neogi
- Silajit Majumder as Nandakumar Neogi/Fake Rudrasekhar Neogi
- Biswajit Chakraborty as Hiralal Somani
- Paran Bandyopadhyay as Purnendu Pal
- Joydip Mukherjee as Inspector Mahadeb Mondal
- Debesh Roy Chowdhury as Bankim Babu
- Rajaram Yagnik as Bhudev Singh
