= Gosainpur Sargaram =

1976 detective story by Satyajit Ray

Gosainpur Sargaram is a detective story written by Satyajit Ray starring his famous characters Feluda and Topshe. It was first published in Sandesh in 1976.

== Plot ==
Feluda is called to Gosaipur by Jiban Mallick, the son of the local Zamindar Shyamlal Mallick to investigate a threat to his father's life. Everyone in the village knows that the father and the son are at loggerheads. Shyamlal is also an eccentric who eschews anything modern. Then, instead of Syamlal, his son Jiban Mallick is killed and the wealth of Mallick's looted. Oddly though, the dead body of Jiban Mallick vanishes, only to reappear again. Feluda works this out with a mixture of investigating skills and deception. The oxymoric title adds a lot to the story.

== Adaptation ==
A TV movie was made around 1996.
