= The Mystery of the Pink Pearl =

The Mystery of the Pink Pearl (Golapi Mukta Rahasya) is a Bengali detective story written by Satyajit Ray. Feluda is the protagonist of the story. It was first published in Sandesh (magazine), 1989. The story ranks 31st in the Feluda series.

== Synopsis ==
In the title story, a rare pink pearl surfaces in a little Bengal village, and the owner turns to Feluda for protection against the machinations of the sleuth's old enemy, the devious Maganlal Meghraj. As the plot twists and turns, Feluda ends up in the sinister galis of Banaras, where he must outwit Maganlal once again to recover the pearl.

== Adaptation ==
The story was adapted into a telefilm "Golapi Mukta Rahasya" directed by Sandip Ray.

The story was also adapted into a graphic novel by Abhijit Chattopadhyay for Anandamela Pujabarshiki 2014.
