= Feluda =

Bengali fictional detective by Satyajit Ray

- Feluda character
- Topshe and Feluda in Feludar Goyendagiri; Illustrated by Ray himself.
- First appearance: Feludar Goyendagiri (1965)
- Last appearance: Robertsoner Ruby (1991)
- Created by: Satyajit Ray
- Portrayed by: Soumitra Chatterjee (Original); Shashi Kapoor; Sabyasachi Chakrabarty; Abir Chatterjee; Ahmed Rubel; Parambrata Chatterjee; Tota Roy Chowdhury; Indraneil Sengupta; Rahul Bose; Santu Mukherjee
- Voiced by: Soumitra Chatterjee; Sabyasachi Chakrabarty; Rahul Bose; Santu Mukherjee
- Motion capture: Soumitra Chatterjee; Shashi Kapoor; Sabyasachi Chakrabarty; Abir Chatterjee; Ahmed Rubel; Parambrata Chatterjee; Tota Roy Chowdhury; Indraneil Sengupta

In-universe information
- Full name: Pradosh Chandra Mitter
- Alias: Feluda
- Occupation: Private Investigator
- Family: Jaykrishna Mitra (Father)
- Relatives: Tapesh Ranjan Mitra (Topshe) (Cousin)
- Religion: Hinduism
- Home: 21, Rajani Sen Road, Kolkata-700029
- Nationality: Indian
- Height: ~6 ft 0 in (1.83 m) (Note: Soumitra Chatterjee, who played Feluda under Satyajit Ray's direction, was 5'11.5", matching Feluda.)
- Friend: Lalmohan Ganguly

Feluda is a fictional detective and private investigator created by Indian director, writer and Oscar winner Satyajit Ray. Feluda (birth name: Pradosh Chandra Mitter) resides at 21 Rajani Sen Road, Ballygunge, Calcutta, West Bengal, India. He first made his appearance in a Bengali children's magazine called Sandesh in 1965, under the editorialship of Ray and Subhas Mukhopadhyay. His first adventure was "Feludar Goendagiri". Feluda is one of the most impactful and renowned Bengali characters of all time.

Feluda is often accompanied by his cousin, who is also his assistant, Tapesh Ranjan Mitter {in earlier stories Tapesh Ranjan Bose} (affectionately called Topshe by Feluda), who serves as the narrator of the stories. From the sixth story, the novel Sonar Kella (The Golden Fortress), the duo are joined by a popular thriller writer, Jatayu (Lalmohan Ganguli).

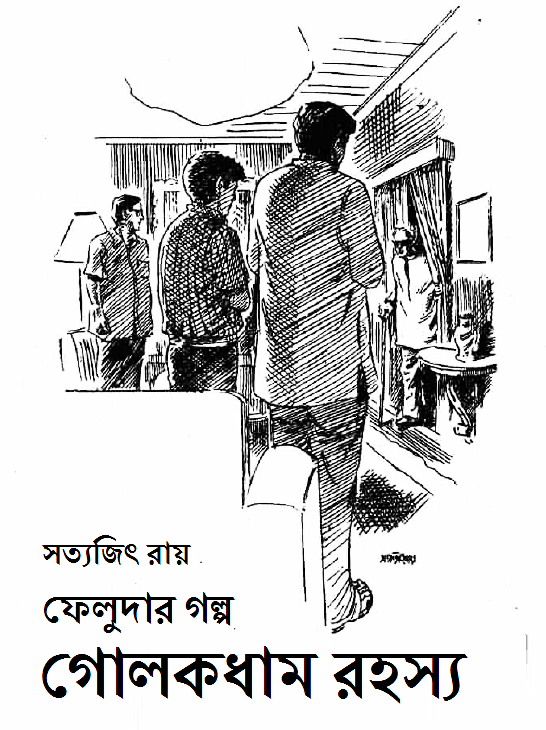
Illustration from Golokdham Rahasya. In the middle, Topshe (left) & Feluda (right). Topshe is 5'7" (1.70 m) and he looks 5inches shorter than Feluda (both are bending so it looks like a 7-in difference). This makes Feluda 6'.

Feluda has had been adapted at times, with the character been played and voiced by Soumitra Chatterjee (also voiced), Sabyasachi Chakrabarty (also voiced), Ahmed Rubel, Shashi Kapoor, Rahul Bose (BBC radio), Abir Chatterjee, Parambrata Chatterjee, Tota Roy Chowdhury, Santu Mukherjee (Thursday Nightsaga) and Indraneil Sengupta. Satyajit Ray directed two Feluda movies — Sonar Kella (1974) and Joi Baba Felunath (1978) Feluda was played by Soumitra Chatterjee . Sandip Ray made a new Feluda film series (a continuation of the original series) on Feluda's adventures which started from Baksho Rahashya (1996). In this series he made ten TV films and six theatrical films in Bengali on the character. Sandip Ray also made a stand-alone Feluda film Badshahi Angti (2014) which was intended to be the first film of a reboot series featuring Abir Chatterjee, but the projects were ultimately shelved and Sandip Ray revived his original film series starring Sabyasachi Chakrabarty. On 23 December 2022, Hatyapuri was released under the banner of Shadow Films. This was the reboot to the previous Feluda film series. The film was directed by Sandip Ray and starred Indraneil Sengupta as Feluda alongside Ayush Das and Abhijit Guha as Topshe and Jatayu respectively. Within a year and a half, Nayan Rahasya was released in May 2024, produced by Surinder Films. Indraneil Sengupta, Ayush Das and Abhijit Guha reprise the role of Feluda, Topshe and Jatayu respectively.

== Character development ==
=== Inspiration from Sherlock Holmes ===
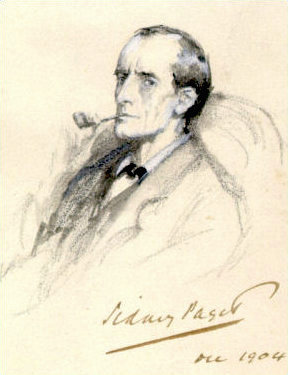
Feluda is a big admirer of Sherlock Holmes. In Kailash Choudharyr Pathar, he praises the way Holmes used to draw significant conclusions from subtle observations. In Londone Feluda, during a visit to Baker Street, he refers to Holmes as the "master" (Bengali: guru) of all private detectives.

Satyajit Ray had deep interests in crime fiction and he read all of the Sherlock Holmes stories in his school days. And when Ray himself started writing crime fiction, unsurprisingly, the character Sherlock Holmes inspired his writings. Feluda's character resembles Sherlock Holmes and Tapesh/Topshe's character resembles Dr Watson. In the stories of Feluda, he is displayed as a big admirer of Sherlock Holmes which he mentions multiple times. In Kailash Choudhury'r Pathar he praises the way Holmes used to draw large conclusions from observations. In Londone Feluda, when Feluda goes to Baker Street, he openly addresses Holmes as the "master" (Bengali: guru) of all private detectives.

=== Personality ===
Pradosh Chandra Mitter, popularly known by his nickname Feluda, first appeared in the eponymous Bengali short story Feludar Goyendagiri (Danger in Darjeeling) in 1965. The story, written by Satyajit Ray, was published in Sandesh, a children's periodical founded by Ray's grandfather, Upendrakishore Ray Chowdhury and edited by Ray himself. In the Feluda series that followed, he was portrayed as a man of around 27 (born around 1938) with a tall (almost 6'0"), athletic figure. Despite being a strongly built man adept in martial arts, Feluda relies mostly upon his superb analytical ability and observation skill (jokingly referred to as the Magajastra or brain-weapon) to solve cases instead of using physical strength or weapons. He is very choosy about taking up cases and prefers cases that require cerebral effort. He possesses a .32 Colt revolver, but the weapon is used very infrequently and mostly for non-violent purposes. However, contemporary (2000s) movies based on Feluda stories feature scenes of violence uncharacteristic in the literature, where Feluda demonstrates his martial art prowess. A master of disguises, Feluda is known to be an adept sleight-of-hand, and he puts these skills to use to solve multiple cases. Feluda often calls a meeting after solving the mystery, where he cajoles the culprit into admitting their crime.

=== Personal life ===
In his personal life, Feluda is a common Bengali youth who has been brought up by his father's younger brother (Tapesh/Topshe's father) after being orphaned when he was only 9. His father, the late Joykrishna Mitra, used to teach Mathematics and Sanskrit at Dhaka Collegiate School. According to the story 'Royal Bengal Rahasya', The ancestral Home of Feluda was in Sona Dighi Village of Bikrampur Region of Dhaka (Now Munshiganj District). His elder Uncle was a manager of an amindari Estate in Mymensingh and a hunter. After the Partition of 1947, his family moved from Dhaka to Calcutta, living in a rented house in Tara Road. Later, they moved to 21 Rajani Sen Road. Feluda had a job in the bank before his detective career. He finds an avid listener in his cousin Tapesh. He often uses his oratory skill at the climactic scenes to cajole the culprit into confessing his crime. He is an early riser and is frequently shown starting his day with exercises and yoga.

Contrary to his otherwise healthy lifestyle, Feluda enjoys smoking cigarettes and chewing betel leaves after lunch. His favourite brand of cigarettes is Charminar. His interests include food, popular music, movies, and books. He is a fan of Sherlock Holmes and, according to the film Tintorettor Jishu and novel Bombaiyer Bombete, Bruce Lee. He has a voracious reading habit which contributes to the general knowledge he employs while socialising and solving mysteries. He always researches destinations before visiting. He is a fan of Tintin, whose series, The Adventures of Tintin, is often referenced in the series. He is also a fan of the authors Bibhutibhushan Bandyopadhyay, Jim Corbett and Kenneth Anderson. His favourite book was "Aranyak", written by Bibhutibhushan Bandyopadhyay. He enjoys non-fiction books like Aku-Aku, Chariots of the Gods?, and The Numerology of Dr. Matrix.

Feluda has love and respect for Lalmohan Ganguly (Jatayu) and his fictional creation Prakhar Rudra is liked by Feluda. He also frequently points out errors and inaccuracies in Jatayu's adventure series. In the story Bombaiy-er Bombete (The Bandits of Bombay), Jatayu asks Feluda to accompany him to Mumbai to help with a script he has sold to a Bollywood producer. Feluda is protective and caring about his cousin, yet he always keeps picking mistakes or humor of or from Topshe. Topshe, the narrator, greatly admires his brother and loves to be a part of his adventures. Feluda has never shown interest in any woman, and there are very few female characters in the stories or films (except some minor characters like Topshe's mother).

== Other characters ==
=== Topshe ===
Feluda's paternal (maternal in the first two stories) cousin Tapesh Ranjan Mitter, who is fondly referred to as Topshe, is based on Arthur Conan Doyle's conception of Dr. John Watson. In the first couple of stories, his surname was Bose, but later it changed to Mitra. Just like the former army surgeon, Topshe is the quintessential accomplice and faithfully records each of Pradosh Mitter's exploits accurately. Topshe is a smart teenager. In the first story of Feluda series (i.e. Feludar Goyendagiri), Topshe was thirteen and a half where Feluda's age was twenty-seven, just the double of Topshe. Though Feluda often teases his young cousin, he is extremely fond and very protective of him. Feluda lives with Topshe's family. Topshe's father, Binay Mitter is the younger brother of Feluda's father, and therefore his uncle, and they all reside at 21, Rajani Sen Road, Kolkata-700029. Although there really is a 'Rajani Sen Road' in Kolkata, the house number is missing. Formerly, they all used to live in Tara road, Kolkata. Though not mentioned explicitly, Topshe is good-looking, fair, tall and handsome, as per different illustrations made by Satyajit Ray himself. During Sonar Kella, Topshe was 5'5.5" tall (Topshe was two inches taller than Jatayu, who was 5'3.5"). But during Golokdham Rahasya, Topshe became taller and reached the height of 5'7".

Detailed knowledge regarding Topshe's high school education is not available, but he used to go to school during the adventure of Sonar Kella (the sixth book of Feluda series). In the film adaptation of Sonar Kella, Topshe's mother shows her concern regarding his career and study as he spends much time solving cases with Feluda. By the time of Kailashe Kelenkari (the ninth book of the series) he have had his secondary examination ('Madhyamik Pariksha'). Just like Feluda, Topshe also used to read lot of books to enhance his knowledge. Topshe often gets his lessons from Feluda himself. In many cases, Feluda tests his deductive knowledge and he usually passes the test satisfactorily. In the movie Sonar Kella Topshe's father aptly said that Topshe is a lucky boy who got Feluda as his mentor. Topshe is fond of 'Adventures of Tintin' comic series. In the book Kailashe Kelenkari, he is found reading 'Tintin in Tibet'.

Topshe always takes an active part in Feluda's adventure. Though in most cases, he follows Feluda's instructions or indications, there are instances where he himself gets involved into some action/investigation. To mention a few, he and Jatayu (a.k.a. Lalmohan Ganguly) sneaks into a warehouse in 'Patan' (Nepal) to discover vast collection of smuggled narcotics (book Jato Kando Kathmandute); finds out the stabbed body of a missing man in the woods (book Darjeeling Jomjomat); replaces the pink pearl with a fake for safe-keeping (book Golapi Mukta Rahasya). The last incident impressed Feluda as well. However, all these activities mainly comes in the latter part of the series. He also interrogated the suspects in Apsara Theaterer Mamla when Feluda was sick and bedridden. Feluda solved the case just from the report of that interrogation.

In movies and TV films the character of Feluda has been played by Soumitra Chatterjee, Shashi Kapoor, Sabyasachi Chakrabarty and recently Abir Chatterjee, while Topshe has been played by Siddartha Chatterjee, Alankar Joshi, Saswata Chatterjee, Parambrata Chattopadhyay and Saheb Bhattacharya over the years. In Sandip Ray's 2014 film Badshahi Angti, actor Sourav Das played the role.

In Srijit Mukherjee's Webseries, Topshe was played by Kalpan Mitra and Feluda was played by Tota Roy Chowdhury. In Arindam Sil's Webseries, Feluda was played by Parambrata Chattopadhyay and Topshe by Rwitobroto Mukherjee.

=== Lalmohan Ganguli or Jatayu ===
Lalmohan Ganguli is a close friend of Pradosh Chandra Mitter, and is described as the author of a series of Bengali crime thrillers written under the pseudonym 'Jatayu'. His crime stories and novels are usually derided as unbelievable, considering that his main character is always the superhero Prakhar Rudra. Though all his novels seem to have become best-sellers, he often tends to make extremely silly mistakes such as spelling igloos as 'ilgoos'. In Baksho Rahasya or Incident on the Kalka Mail, he confuses hippos with walruses — a tendency that Feluda often tries to correct. He sometimes serves as a perfect foil to the group and in Ray's own words provides 'dollops of humour', although he sometimes does some brave acts not expected of him. To mention a few, he knocked out goons in Baksho Rahasya (using his boomerang), Joto Kando Kathmandute (using a prayer wheel), Tintorettor Jishu (using a packing box) and Ebar Kando Kedarnathe (using a stick), which impressed Feluda as well. He owns a 'Madrasi green' Ambassador car. Jatayu makes his first appearance in Sonar Kella joining Feluda and Topshe in the train at Agra, on their way to Jodhpur. In the first two films on Feluda, which were directed by Ray himself, the character was played by Santosh Dutta, and after the first one, Ray modified the literary character to some extent, making him look and behave quite like Dutta himself. In the next films directed by Ray's son, Sandip Ray, this character was played by Mohan Agashe, Rabi Ghosh, Anup Kumar and Bibhu Bhattacharya respectively. Jatayu also has a fantasy of collecting weapons. In various books he carried weapons like 'kukri' (Nepali knife), and smoke bomb. Jatayu lives at Garpar in Kolkata, and it may be recalled that Satyajit Ray himself passed his childhood at 100, Garpar.

=== Sidhu Jetha ===
Sidhu Jetha's formal name is Siddheshwar Bose. He is an aged character who has described himself to be like Sherlock Holmes's brother Mycroft, living in Sardar Sankar Road, Lake Market, Kalighat, Kolkata. He is a bibliophile, and has an extensive base of general knowledge, current and historical affairs. He is a close friend of Feluda's father, being former neighbours in their ancestral village in Bangladesh. Feluda's jyatha (that is, uncle) is said to have a 'photographic memory', and is a vast source of information which comes in handy when Feluda is in need of some. His vast knowledge comes from his collection of varied kinds of newspaper clippings which he has accumulated over the years. The role was played by Harindranath Chattopadhyay in Sonar Kella, Ajit Bandopadhyay in Baksho Rahashya, Dibya Bhattacharya in Golapi Mukto Rahashya, Haradhan Banerjee in Kailashe Kelenkari and in Gorosthaney Sabdhan and by Paran Bandyopadhyay in Double Feluda. Following recent Feluda films made by Sandip Ray, Satyajit Ray's son, there have been questions over Sidhu Jyatha's continued relevance in the stories considering technologies such as the internet offer a faster, wider and more effective knowledge base than a well-read person.

=== Haripada Datta ===
Haripada Datta is the driver of Lalmohon Ganguli's second-hand green Mark II Ambasador car. He is a loyal, intelligent and reliable person and is of great help when needed. He played a crucial role in Gorosthaney Sabhdhan where he saved the lives of Feluda, Jatayu, and Topshe. He also has a minor role in Boshpukery Khunkharapi, where he takes part in a surveillance mission with the rest of Feluda's gang in disguise playing 29 cardgame.

=== Maganlal Meghraj ===
Maganlal Meghraj, as drawn by Satyajit Ray

Meghraj is a villainous character who appears in three Feluda stories, including Joi Baba Felunath, Joto Kando Kathmandute, and Golapi Mukta Rahasya. He has been compared to Professor Moriarty of the Sherlock Holmes series. Utpal Dutta immortalised this character in one Feluda movie Joi Baba Felunath and a Hindi Feluda Telefilm Kissa Kathmandu Mein, which Satyajit Ray and Sandip Ray directed respectively. After him Mohan Agashe played this character twice in telefilms.

Maganlal lives in Benaras. He has a house in Joka, Kolkata. His son's name is Surajlal Meghraj. He is officially a money-lender but is involved in smuggling artifacts, narcotics (through Indo-Nepal border) and jewellery. His Kolkata house had been raided once but he escaped any charges until Feluda caught him red-handed in smuggling an invaluable Ganesh Murti (an idol of the elephant god) during the case of Joi Baba Felunath. However, he was not behind bars for a long time. In the nineteenth book, Jato Kando Kathmandute, Feluda said that he was not at all surprised seeing Meghraj out of jail as that was nothing for such an influential person. Once again he was arrested in charge of murder and smuggling, yet he averted any long term punishment and we saw him once again in the thirty-first story, Golapi Mukta Rahasya.

Maganlal is a good judge of human character. He lured Bikash Singh, secretary of Umanath Ghoshal, to steal the invaluable 'Ganesh Murti' from the Ghoshal-house. He also has a special interest in humiliating Jatayu. In Joi Baba Felunath he made Jatayu the subject of a knife-throwing play. In Jato Kando Kathmandute, he purposefully slips an LSD-laced sugar cube in Jatayu's tea. In his third appearance, he made Jatayu to sing a Tagore song (which Jatayu said his first time experience of singing a song). Surprisingly, he shows a queer fondness to Jatayu and usually calls him 'Uncle'.

During these three stories, we see many accomplices of Maganlal. Some of them are Machhli-Baba, Bikash Sinha, Arjun the knife thrower, Anantalaal Batra, Dr. Dibakar and Manohar. Maganlaal has his own Bajra by which he travels in Ganga near Benaras. The door of his house in Benaras is painted with figures of two swordsmen. During the making of the movie, Joi Baba Felunath, this swordsmen were painted by Satyajit Ray himself.

=== Pulak Ghoshal ===
Ghoshal is a Mumbai-based popular Hindi film director hailing from Kolkata. His original home in Kolkata is in the neighbourhood of Lalmohonbabu's in northern Kolkata's Garpar. He has directed two films based on Lalmohonbabu's stories. During the shooting of both these films, dangerous events took place, resulting in arrest of a producer in one film (Bombaiyer Bombete) and arrest of an actor in another film (Darjeeling Jamjomat).

=== Minor characters ===
- Srinath is the domestic help of Feluda and Topshe. He is often seen serving tea and snacks for Feluda and his clients.
- Jagannath is the household cook at Feluda's place.
- Bharadwaj is the household cook at Lalmohan Babu's place.
- Baikuntha Nath Mallik was a poet, tourist and Bangla teacher at Ethenium Institution where Lalmohan Babu used to study. When he was in the seventh grade, he won prize for reciting Baikuntha's poem on sea. Lalmohan Babu often describes him as a great poet who did not get the adulation he deserved. There is no presence of him in the story but in some stories we can see Jatayu reciting his poems.

== In other media ==
=== Films ===
Satyajit Ray directed Sonar Kella (1974) and Joi Baba Felunath (1979) into movies in Bengali, starring actor Soumitra Chatterjee as Feluda, Santosh Dutta as Jatayu and Siddartha Chatterjee as Topshe. This two films created a cult following in Bengali cinema later years.

Sandip Ray directed five Feluda theatrical feature-length films, starring actor Sabyasachi Chakrabarty as Feluda, Parambrata Chatterjee as Topshe in the first three films (Later he was replaced by Saheb Bhattacharyya) and Bibhu Bhattacharya as Jatayu. But the first theatrically released Feluda film directed by Sandip Ray was Baksho Rahashya (1996) which was the first film of the Feluda TV film series and was made for television release only.It was released in theaters in December 2001.In this TV film Sabyasachi Chakrabarty was Feluda, Saswata Chatterjee was Topshe and Rabi Ghosh was Jatayu.

- Bombaiyer Bombete was released in December 2003.
- Kailashey Kelenkari was released in December 2007.
- Tintorettor Jishu was released in December 2008.
- Gorosthaney Sabdhan was released in December 2010.
- Royal Bengal Rahashya, released in December 2011

Then Sandip Ray directed Badshahi Angti which was released in November 2014, in which Abir Chatterjee is playing Feluda for first time. This was going to be a reboot to previous the Feluda film series after Royal Bengal Rahashya. However, in 2016 Sandip Ray cancelled the reboot series because Abir Chatterjee started a new version of film series based on the Byomkesh Bakshi franchise under Shree Venkatesh Films and Surinder Films. The other reason was the new Feluda movie Sandip Ray intended to make under a Mumbai-based production house Eros International, but Abir has a strict contract with Shree Venkatesh Films and Surinder Films. For the cancellation of the reboot series Badshahi Angti is now considered as a stand-alone reboot film.

As a tribute to the 50-year anniversary of Feluda, a special film Double Feluda was released in December 2016. It was a continuation of the original Feluda movie series where Sabyasachi Chakrabarty and Saheb Bhattacharya reprised their roles as Feluda and Topshe respectively. The movie consisted of two stories, Samaddar-er-Chabi and Golokdham Rahashya, shown on either half of the movie.

On 23 December 2022, Hatyapuri was released under the banner of Shadow Films. This was the reboot to the previous Feluda film series. The film was directed by Sandip Ray and starred Indraneil Sengupta as Feluda alongside Ayush Das and Abhijit Guha as Topshe and Jatayu respectively. Within a year and a half, Nayan Rahasya was released in May 2024, produced by Surinder Films. Indraneil Sengupta, Ayush Das and Abhijit Guha reprise the role of Feluda, Topshe and Jatayu respectively.

=== Television ===
- Kissa Kathmandu Mein (in Hindi, based on Joto Kando Kathmandute for DD National) (1986).Feluda was played by Shashi Kapoor, Jatayu by Mohan Agashe, Topshe by Alankar Joshi and Magan Lal Meghraj once again by Utpal Dutt.
- Ghurghutiyar Ghatona (1992) and Golokdham Rahasya (1992) were directed by Bibhash Chakraborty.Feluda was played by Soumitra Chatterjee in these two Bengali Feluda telefilms.

In addition to the feature films, 10 Feluda stories have been filmed by Sandip Ray.Sabyasachi Chakrabarty played that role in these Feluda telefilms.Jatayu was played by Rabi Ghosh in the first two TV films, after his death Anup Kumar played Jatayu and finally by Bibhu Bhattacharya.In all these Feluda TV films Topshe was played by Saswata Chatterjee.These television films under the names/packages:

- Feluda 30 (1996–1998) (for DD Bangla, Later Repeated in Tara Muzik)

(The Episodes were -
Baksho Rahashya,
Gosaipur Sargaram,
Sheyal Devta Rahashya,
Bosepukure Khunkharapi,
Joto Kando Kathmandu)

- Satyajiter Goppo (1999) (made for DD Bangla)

(The Episodes were -
Jahangirer Swarnamudra,
Ghurghutiyar Ghotona,
Golapi Mukto Rahashya,
Ambar Sen Antardhan Rahashya)

- Satyajiter Priyo Golpo (2000) (for ETV Bangla)

(The Episode was - Dr Munshir Diary)
From 1999 to 2001 Bangladesh Television (BTV) aired nine Feluda TV films. The series gained a huge popularity in Bangladesh.

Sandip Ray has sold the rights of Feluda stories to Bangladeshi production company Kandy Productions, who are producing a TV series inspired by the original Feluda series. It premiered on Channel i as well as digitally on Bioscopelive from September, 2017. The series is available in India on the digital platform Addatimes Digital. Dhaka based Kandy Production is producing the series jointly with Top of Mind Creations, another Bangladeshi TV and film production house. This series depicted Feluda as a modern time detective. It has three episodes titled as 'Sheyal Devta Rahashya','Ghurghutiyar Ghotona' and 'Golokdham Rahashya.Parambrata Chatterjee plays Feluda and Riddhi Sen plays Topshe. The series is directed by Parambrata Chatterjee.'.

The first Bangladeshi adaptation of Feluda was released in 2019. Feluda is played by versatile actor, Ahmed Rubel, it also stars legendary actor, Abul Hayat. It is directed by actor-director Tauquir Ahmed.It was titled Noyon Rohossho-Feluda.It's still available on Bioscopelive.

=== Web series ===
- Feluda (Directed by Parambrata Chatterjee)

A Bangladeshi streaming TV series Feluda from the streaming platform Bioscopelive was directed by Parambrata Chatterjee, who also played the title character along with Riddhi Sen playing Topshe, was released in 2017–2018 in three seasons. This streaming TV series is not a part of the Feluda film canon directed by Satyajit Ray and Sandip Ray. Stories adapted were Sheyal Debota Rahasyo, Ghurghutiyar Ghotona, and Golokdham Rahasya and aired on Bioscopelive from September 2017. The series became available in India on the digital platform Addatimes.

- Feluda - Noyon Rohoshsho (Directed by Tauquir Ahmed)

A Bangladeshi adaptation of the famous detective story Feluda was released in 2019 as a three-episode mini-series on the Bioscopelive streaming platform. Directed by Tauquir Ahmed, the series is inspired by the 1980 novel written by Satyajit Ray. Notably, this production marked the first significant screen adaptation of Feluda featuring a completely Bangladeshi cast and crew. The central role of detective Pradosh C. Mitter, widely known as Feluda, was played by the late Ahmed Rubel. His performance presents the character as calm, analytical, and intellectually sharp, supported by his deep and authoritative voice that adds weight to the role. Alongside him, Rawnak Hasan appears as Topse, Feluda's cousin and trusted assistant, bringing youthful curiosity and narration to the story. The investigative trio is completed by Azad Abul Kalam in the role of the eccentric writer Lalmohan Ganguly, popularly known as Jatayu.

- Feluda Pherot (Directed by Srijit Mukherji)

In 2020 a streaming television series was made, named Feluda Pherot, based on the iconic Bengali detective and there was two popular stories, the novels Chhinnamastar Abhishap and Joto Kando Kathmandute. Bengali actor Tota Roy Chowdhury is playing the main character "Feluda", and Kalpan Mitra as "Topesh" and the iconic character Lalmohan Ganguly, alias "Jatayu", is playing by Anirban Chakraborty, who played the main character in the detective series Eken babu before.

It is available to stream on the web platform Addatimes. Season 1 released on 26 December 2020. The Season 2 was released in October 2025.

- Feludar Goyendagiri (Directed by Srijit Mukherji and Kamaleswar Mukherjee)

The second series named Feludar Goyendagiri is from Hoichoi streaming service with the same cast and crew of Feluda Pherot. Darjeeling Jamjamat, the first season released on 17 June 2022. Hoichoi has announced the release date for Feludar Goyendagiri 2: Bhuswargo Bhoyonkawr. This Feluda series released on 20 December 2023. A third season, based on Royal Bengal Rahashya has been released, directed by Kamaleswar Mukherjee.

- Shabash Feluda (Directed by Arindam Sil)

The series is based on Gangtok-e-Gondogol, is centered on Feluda (Parambrata Chattopadhyay) and Topshe (Rwitobroto Mukherjee) who are on a family vacation in Gangtok. Shabash Feluda released on 5 May 2023 on ZEE5.

=== Animation ===
In 2010 an animated TV film produced by DQE Productions titled Feluda: The Kathmandu Caper was produced and the rights were acquired by Disney Channel (India). The movie premiered on 1 January 2011. DQE Productions also made a 13-episode animation series named Mysteries and Feluda after the animated TV film for Disney XD. The series including the TV film was set into a new universe, where Feluda, Topshe and Jatayu have many gadgets.

=== Radio ===
- The first radio adaptation of Feluda was made by Satyajit Ray in the early 80s, Baksho Rahsaya with his usual cast like Soumitra Chatterjee as Feluda, Santosh Dutta as Jatayu, Siddartha Chatterjee as Topshe and Sushil Majumdar as Sidhu Jyatha along with other prominent actors like Haradhan Bandopadhyay, Biplab Chatterjee and Bikash Roy.
- Akashabani had produced Darjeeling Jomjomat casting a set of regular actors in radio.
- In January 2007, the BBC World Service announced that it would produce at least two 'episodes' of the popular detective stories. Hindi film star Rahul Bose speaks the leading role, with Anupam Kher voicing Lalmohan and Hari Balasubramaniam providing the role of Topshe. The first episode, "The Golden Fortress", aired on 10 February 2007 with the second episode, "The Mystery of the Elephant God", following on 11 August 2007.
- In 2007 Sandip Ray rebooted the radio series with his own set of actors as Sabyasachi Chakrabarty as Feluda, Parambrata Chatterjee as Topshe and Bibhu Bhattacharya as Jatayu. He made two new dramas based on, Gosainpur Sargaram and Dr. Munshir Diary. They with Baksho Rahashya, directed by Satyajit Ray, aired together on Big FM.
- Radio Mirchi Kolkata station airs thrillers in a radio drama format, under the programme name 'Sunday Suspense' which includes some Feluda stories. Feluda is voiced by Sabyasachi Chakrabarty. Dip and Somak voices Topshe and Mir Afsar Ali voices the other characters. Bibhu Bhattacharya voiced Jatayu in only one episode. After Bhattacharya's death Jagannath Basu voices Jatayu.
- Radio Today airs thrillers in a radio format, under the programme name Thursday Nightsaga, which includes some Feluda stories. However, it stopped before finishing the Feluda novel Baksho Rahasya.

=== Comics ===
Some of the Feluda stories have been made into comic strips by artists and authors. Abhijit Chattopadhyay creates a comic strip based on Feluda stories in every Pujabarshiki Anondomela. The comics are published by Ananda Publishers. English versions of comics have appeared in The Telegraph.

Penguin Books has released comic book versions of around 6 Feluda mysteries. The art is drawn by Tapas Guha and the script is by Subhadra Sen Gupta.

=== Music ===
In a collaborative album brought out in 1996 by His Master's Voice, Kabir Suman sings a 'Feludar Gaan' (Feluda's song). The song written by Kabir Suman was first publicised at Sandesh magazine on the special Feluda 30 issue released in December 1995 on the completion of 30 years of Feluda stories. Later, in a collaborative album by His Master's Voice, Choto Boro Miley (1996), the song was composed and performed by three-legend singer-songwriter Kabir Suman, Nachiketa Chakraborty and Anjan Dutt.

Later many of Bengali songs have references and symbols of Feluda franchise including "Calcium" by Anjan Dutt from the album Purono Guitar (1995).

=== Documentary ===
A Bengali documentary film Feluda: 50 Years of Ray's Detective in 2019 was directed by Sagnik Chatterjee. This is the first biopic of India based on a fictional character. This film was released on 7 June 2019.

== In Pujabarshiki ==
Nearly every Feluda story was published annually in the Pujabarshiki Sandesh and Desh (the edition of Desh and Sandesh commemorating the Durgapuja published every year). Thereafter the stories were published as hard-back editions by Ananda Publishers.In 2015 Feluda celebrates his 50th years after appearance. This is printed as 'Feluda 50' in Anandamela.

== See also ==
- Satyajit Ray
- Sandip Ray
- Feluda in film
- Literary works of Satyajit Ray
- Professor Shonku
- Tarini Khuro
- Tarini Khuro in other media
- Parashor Barma
- Kakababu
- Kakababu in other media
- Byomkesh Bakshi
- Byomkesh Bakshi in other media
- Kolkata culture
- Culture of Bengal
- Culture of West Bengal
- Bengali literature
- History of Bengali literature
- List of Bengali-language authors (chronological)
