= Mumbai (disambiguation) =

Mumbai, Maharashtra, India, is a large city that was formerly known as "Bombay".

Mumbai may also refer to:

== Places ==
- Mumbai Harbour
- Mumbai City district
- Mumbai Metropolitan Region
- Mumbai Diocese (disambiguation)
- Mumbai Suburban district
- South Mumbai, a city precinct
- Navi Mumbai, a satellite city next to Mumbai
- Mumbai Circuit, a Hindi film distribution circuit, comprising areas of the former Bombay State in Maharashtra, Gujarat and Karnataka and also Goa, and Dadra and Nagar Haveli and Daman and Diu

== Sports ==
- Mumbai Indians, Indian Premier League franchise based in Mumbai, India
  - Mumbai Indians (WPL), Women's Premier League cricket team based in Mumbai, India
- Mumbai City FC, Indian Super League franchise based in Mumbai, India
- Mumbai cricket team, domestic cricket team based in Mumbai, India

== Other uses ==
- University of Mumbai
- INS Mumbai, Indian Navy warship

== See also ==
- Bombay (disambiguation)
- Mambai (disambiguation)
- Numbay, former name of Jayapura, Indonesia
