= Gorosthaney Sabdhan =

Gorosthaney Sabdhan (lit. 'Careful in Graveyard') may refer to:

- Gorosthaney Sabdhan (novel), a 1977 novel by Satyajit Ray
- Gorosthaney Sabdhan (film), a 2010 Indian film directed by Sandip Ray, based on the novel
