= Bratya Basu =

Indian actor, playwright, author, and politician

- ব্রাত্য বসু
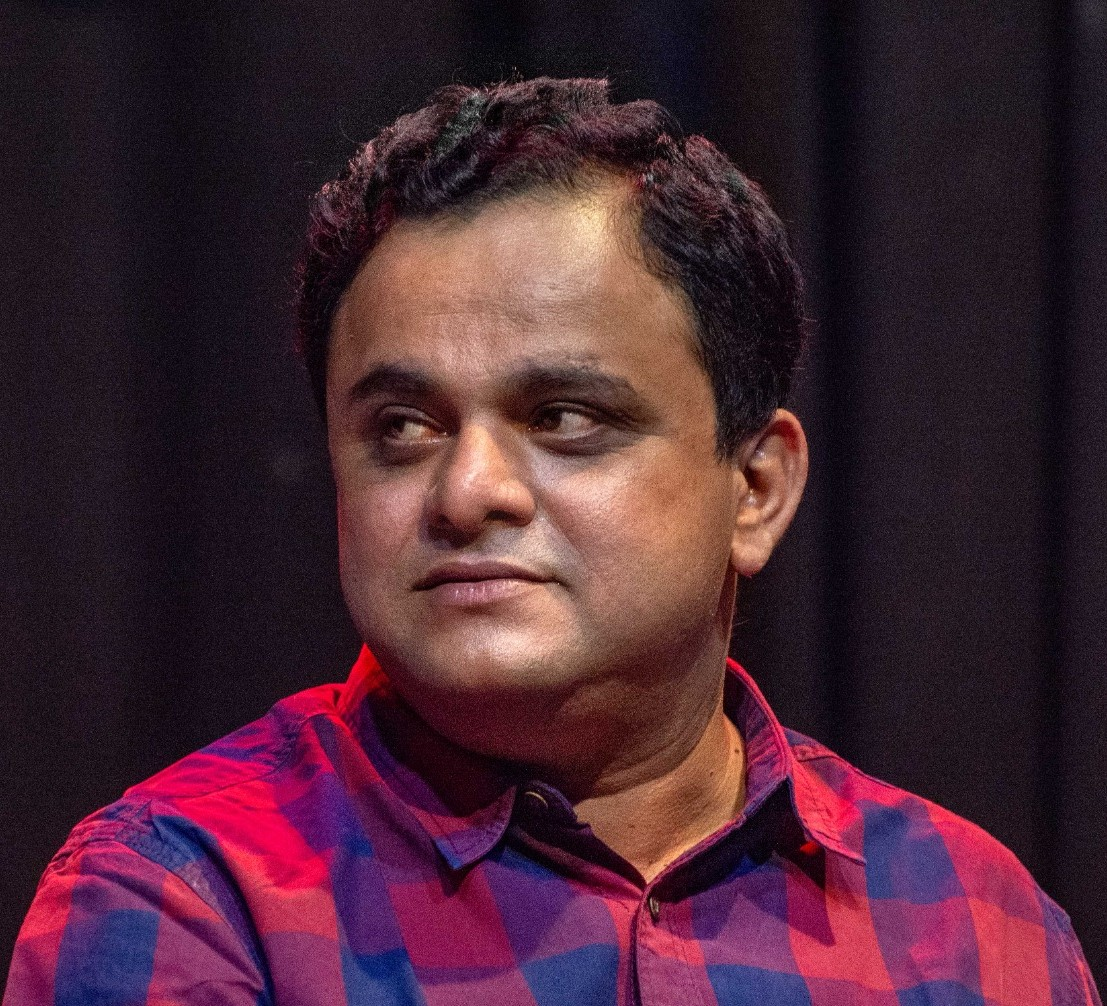
- Basu in 2023

Minister of Education, West Bengal
- In office 10 May 2021 – 7 May 2026
- Governor: Jagdeep Dhankhar
- Chief Minister: Mamata Banerjee
- Preceded by: Partha Chatterjee
- Succeeded by: Dipak Barman (School Education); Jagannath Chattopadhyay (Higher Education)
- In office 20 May 2011 – 20 May 2014
- Preceded by: Partha De (School Education); Sudarshan Roy Chowdhury (Higher Education)
- Succeeded by: Partha Chatterjee

Minister of Information Technology and Electronics
- In office 5 October 2018 – 10 May 2021
- Governor: Keshari Nath Tripathi; Jagdeep Dhankhar
- Chief Minister: Mamata Banerjee
- Succeeded by: Ratna De

Minister for Information Technology and Electronics, Government of West Bengal
- In office 20 May 2016 – 5 October 2018
- Governor: Keshari Nath Tripathi; Jagdeep Dhankhar
- Chief Minister: Mamata Banerjee
- Preceded by: Partha Chatterjee
- Succeeded by: Amit Mitra

Minister of Tourism, Government of West Bengal
- In office 20 May 2014 – 12 May 2016
- Governor: M. K. Narayanan; D. Y. Patil (additional charge); Keshari Nath Tripathi
- Chief Minister: Mamata Banerjee
- Preceded by: Krishnendu Narayan Choudhury
- Succeeded by: Goutam Deb

Member of the West Bengal Legislative Assembly
- In office 2011–2026
- Preceded by: Rekha Goswami
- Succeeded by: Arijit Bakshi
- Constituency: Dum Dum

Personal details
- Born: 25 September 1969 (age 57); Calcutta, West Bengal, India
- Party: Trinamool Congress
- Education: Presidency College, Kolkata; University of Calcutta

Bratyabrata Basu Roy Chowdhury (born 25 September 1969), also known as Bratya Basu, is an Indian actor, stage director, playwright, film director, professor, educationist and politician who served as the Education Minister of West Bengal between 2021 and 2026. He held the same office in the First Mamata Banerjee ministry. In May 2016, Basu was assigned the portfolios of Tourism, Science Technology and Bio-Technology, and Information Technology and Electronics. He has been an elected Member of the Legislative Assembly, from the Dum Dum constituency, from 2011 till 2026. Basu is presently the Chairperson of Paschimbanga Bangla Akademi and Minerva Natyasanskriti Charchakendra under the governance of the Department of Information and Cultural Affairs, West Bengal.

== Early life ==
Bratya Basu was born in Calcutta to Professor Dr. Bishnu Basu and Educational Administrator Dr. Neetika Basu. His original name was Bratyabrata Basu Roy Chowdhury. After his graduation in Bengali from the Presidency College (currently Presidency University, Kolkata), he completed his postgraduate education at the University of Calcutta.

== Career ==
Bratya Basu started his career as a sound operator for the theatre group Ganakrishti and soon started writing and directing plays with the group. The themes of his writings focus on political fantasy, nature-human relationships, the connection between music and life, ethical values and their lack, the conflict between love and revolt, and the bonding between time and culture. Bratya Basu joined City College, Kolkata as an assistant professor in the Department of Bengali. He launched his career as a dramatist with the play Ashaleen (1996), described by theatre critics as the first postmodernist Bengali play. His noted plays thereafter include Aranyadeb, Shahar Yaar, Virus-M, Winkle-Twinkle, etc. His other important plays include Ruddhasangeet, Chatushkon, Hemlat - the Prince of Garanhata, Krishna Gahobar, Sateroi July, Bikele Bhorer Sorshey Phool, Supari Killer, Boma etc. A compilation of his plays has been published in four volumes in 2004, 2010, 2016 and 2022 respectively. He has directed four films– Raasta, which has a theme of youth moving into terrorism, Teesta, a film on society and the failure of romance, Tara, and Dictionary. He has acted in many films, including Kaalbela, Icchey, Sthaniyo Sambad, Hemlock Society, Muktodhara, Double Feluda, Baranda, Jogajog, Kalkijug, Asamapta, and Dhulobali Katha. Basu has received many awards and recognitions. Some of them include the Shambhu Mitra Samman 2016, conferred by Rajdanga Dyotak, Shrestha Natya Nirman 2017, conferred by Anya Theatre, Khaled Choudhury Samman 2017, conferred by Abhash, Dakshin Kolkata, Shilpayan Samman 2017, conferred by Gobordanga Shilpayan, Sumati Sengupta Smriti Samman 2019, conferred by Angan Belghoria, Dronacharya Samman 2019, conferred by Ashoknagar Natyamukh and Satyen Mitra Smriti Puroshkar awarded by Theatre Workshop in 2001, 2003, 2004 and 2017 for his exemplary contribution in Bengali Theatre. He has also been awarded the Gajendra Kumar Mitra-Sumathanath Ghosh Memorial Award 2018, conferred by Mitra & Ghosh Publishers Pvt. Ltd. for his contribution to Bengali Literature.

In 2021, Bratya Basu was conferred with the Sahitya Akademi Award for outstanding works of literature, for his anthology of Bengali theatre, Mir Jafar O Onyanya Natak (a compilation of three plays - Mir Jafar, Ekdin Aladin and Ami Anukulda aar Ora). The award is given by an autonomous organisation of the Government of India, the Ministry of Culture. His plays have been translated into Hindi, English and French.

Hemlat, The Prince of Garanhata has won critical acclaim from academic researchers as an adaptation of William Shakespeare's Hamlet. Sam Kolodezh of the University of California, Irvine, Drama and Theatre heaped praise on Bratya's adaptation. Formerl associate professor at Kuwait University and a life-member of the Shakespeare Society of Eastern India, Antony Johae lectured on the Indianization of Shakespeare's work. Mr. Johae has contributed a research paper on Hemlat in the Vol-V, No.VIII of The International Journal of Cultural Studies and Social Sciences, edited by Dr Prof Amitava Roy, former Shakespeare professor at Rabindra Bharati University and president and co-founder of Shakespeare Society of Eastern India, and professor Ronan Paterson, an actor, director and producer for theatre and film in Britain and Ireland and an extensive writer on Shakespeare.

Bratya Basu formed the theatre group Kalindi Bratyajon in 2008. The first theatrical production of Bratyajon was Ruddhasangeet (2009), a play on the Rabindrasangeet exponent Debabrata Biswas's journey of bitter struggle throughout his life in the prevailing system. The play received acclaim and has so far staged more than 150 shows. He produced "Boma" in 2015, a period piece exposing jealousy, greed for power, and internal conflicts among Bengali freedom fighters. Basu also produced another untold history of Bengal spanning 1757 and 1764. The play Mir Jafar showcases the power politics and game of minds to unravel the complexities in which 'Mir Jafar' continues to be the emblematic representation of the 'universal betrayer' in all societies and times.

== Role in theater ==
=== Plays written ===
Play	Notes	Produced by	Year	Director	Ref
Prachhaya	Adaptation of John Middlton Synge's 'In the Shadow of the Glen'	Ganakrishti	1993	Sabyasachi Chatterjee	
Ora Panchjon	Adaptation of Peter Shaffer's 'Five Finger Exercise'	Ganakrishti	1994	Amitabha Dutta	
Ashalin		Ganakrishti	1996	Bratya Basu	Natok Samagra Vol I ISBN 8177564323
Aranyadeb		Ganakrishti / Swapnalu	1998 / 2018	Bratya Basu / Premangshu Roy	Natok Samagra Vol I ISBN 8177564323
Mukhomukhi Bosibar / Teesta		Swapnasandhani / Abhash	2001 / 2016	Koushik Sen / Sekhar Samaddar	Natok Samagra Vol I ISBN 8177564323
Kalantak Lalfita	Based on Shibram Chakraborty's story	Chetana	2000	Suman Mukhopadhyay	Natok Samagra Vol II ISBN 9788177569438
Chatushkon		Ganakrishti / Aakar Kala Sangam	2001	Bratya Basu / Suresh Bhardwaj	Natok Samagra Vol I ISBN 8177564323
Shahar Yaar		Ganakrishti	2001	Bratya Basu	Natok Samagra Vol I ISBN 8177564323
Winkle Twinkle		Sansriti	2002	Debesh Chattopadhyay	Natok Samagra Vol I ISBN 8177564323
Babli		Drishypat / Purba Paschim	2003 /2005	Anirban Bhattacharjee / Bratya Basu	Natok Samagra Vol I ISBN 8177564323
Virus M		Ganakrishti	2003	Bratya Basu	Natok Samagra Vol I ISBN 8177564323
Sateroi July	Inspired by John Wexley's 'They shall not Die' and Utpal Dutta's 'Manusher Adhikare'	Ganakrishti / Circle Theatre / Thelovers	2004 / 2013 / 2017	Bratya Basu / Bapi Bose / Debashish Dutta	
May Dibaser Latok			2005		Natok Samagra Vol II ISBN 9788177569438
Page 4:It's also a game		Lokokrishti / IFTA	2005 / 2016	Bratya Basu / Debashish Dutta	Natok Samagra Vol II ISBN 9788177569438
Operation 2010		Ashoknagar Natyamukh	2005 / 2014	Avi Chakraborty	Natok Samagra Vol II ISBN 9788177569438
Debitarjon			2006		Natok Samagra Vol II ISBN 9788177569438
Hemlat:The prince of Garanhata	Adaptation of William Shakespeare's 'Hamlet'	Ballygunge Swapnasuchona	2006	Bratya Basu	Natok Samagra Vol II ISBN 9788177569438
Mrityu Ishwar Jaunota		Srijak / Ashoknagar Ntyamukh / Prachya	2006 / 2015 / 2017	Debashish Basu / Avi Chakraborty / Biplab Bandyopadhyay	Natok Samagra Vol I ISBN 8177564323
Aagunmukho	Adaptation of Marius von Mayenburg's 'Feuergesicht' (Fireface)	Tritiyo Sutra & The Goethe Institute	2007	Suman Mukhopadhyay	
Baborer Prarthona		Kalyani Natyacharcha Kendra	2007	Kishore Sengupta	Natok Samagra Vol II ISBN 9788177569438
Krihnagawhbar		Niva Arts	2007	Bratya Basu	Natok Samagra Vol II ISBN 9788177569438
Comrade Katha		Swapnasandhani / Playmakers	2008 / 2017	Koushik Sen / Kaustabh Duttagupta	Natok Samagra Vol II ISBN 9788177569438
Orkute Jukto Holo Baltimore Aar Nadia			2009		Natok Samagra Vol II ISBN 9788177569438
Ruddhasangeet	Play on famous Rabindrasangeet advocate Debabrata Biswas	Kalindi Bratyajon	2009	Bratya Basu	Natok Samagra Vol II ISBN 9788177569438
Darjiparar Marjinara		Swapnasandhani	2009	Koushik Sen	Natok Samagra Vol II ISBN 9788177569438
Bhoy		Swapnasandhani / Thealight	2009 / 2019	Koushik Sen / Atanu Sarkar	Natok Samagra Vol II ISBN 9788177569438
Supari Killer		Prachya	2011	Biplab Bandyopadhyay	Natok Samagra Vol III ISBN 9789350406786
Bikele Bhorer Sarshephul		Sansriti	2011	Debesh Chattopadhyay	Natok Samagra Vol II ISBN 9788177569438
Cinemar Moto		Kalindi Bratyajon	2013	Bratya Basu	ISBN 9789350406786
Apatoto Eivabe Dujoner Dekha Hoye Thake		Sansriti	2013	Debesh Chattopadhyay	Natok Samagra Vol III ISBN 9789350406786
Altaf Gomes		Sansriti	2013	Debesh Chattopadhyay	Natok Samagra Vol III ISBN 9789350406786
Samayjaan		Theatre Platform / Ashokenagar Natyamukh	2013 / 2017	Debashish Roy / Avi Chakraborty	Natok Samagra Vol II ISBN 9788177569438
Khanjana Ami Aar Asbona		Theatre Platform	2013	Debashish Roy	Natok Samagra Vol II ISBN 9788177569438
Ke?		Kalindi Bratyajon	2014	Bratya Basu	Natok Samagra Vol III ISBN 9789350406786
Duto Din		Pancham Baidik	2014	Arpita Ghosh	Natok Samagra Vol III ISBN 9789350406786
Jatugriha		Sansriti / Shantipur Sanskritik	2015	Debesh Chattopadhyay / Kaushik Chattopadhyay	Natok Samagra Vol III ISBN 9789350406786
Anandibai	Based on Parashuram's story	Howrah Bratyajon	2015	Debashish Biswas	Natok Samagra Vol III ISBN 9789350406786
Boma		Kalindi Bratyajon	2015	Bratya Basu	Natok Samagra Vol III ISBN 9789350406786
Ila Gurhoisha		Theatre Platform	2015	Debashish Roy	Natok Samagra Vol III ISBN 9789350406786
Banijye Basate Lakkhi		Paikpara Indraranga	2017	Bratya Basu	Troyee ISBN 9789350202562
Jibjantu		Theatre Platform / Rabindranagar Natyaudh	2017	Debashsish Roy / Dani Karmakar	Natok Samagra Vol III ISBN 9789350406786
Fourth Bell		IFTA	2017	Debashish Dutta	Eibare Duti Natok
Anusochna		Ayanda	2017	Biplab bandyopadhyay	Troyee ISBN 9789350202562
Hridipash		Theatre Platform	2017	Debashish Roy	Troyee ISBN 9789350202562
Akdin Aladin		Swapnalu / Paikpara Indraranga	2018	Premangshu Roy / Kanchan Mallick	Mir Jafar O Onyanyo Natok ISBN 9789350203606
Ami Onukulda Aar Ora		Ashokenagar Natyamukh	2018	Avi Chakraborty	Mir Jafar O Onyanyo Natok ISBN 9789350203606
Bisarjaner Por		Playmakers	2018	Kaustabh Duttagupta	Natok Samagra Vol II ISBN 9788177569438
Mir Jafar		Kalindi Bratyajon / Shriram Centre	2018 / 2020	Bratya Basu / Azhar Alam	Mir Jafar O Onyanyo Natok ISBN 9789350203606
Antim Raat			2019		
Creusa, the Queen		Chetana	2020	Sujan Mukhopadhyay	
Coronar Dingulite Prem			2020		
Matsyanyaya			2020		Matsyanyaya ISBN 9789354252778
Roll-Action-Cut			2020		
Fyodor			2020		Fyodor ISBN 9789393910028
Tin Atotayee			2020		Tin Atotayee:Ekti Ekok Sanglap ISBN 9781565812314
Ei Raat Tomar Amar		Patra Bharati	2025		ISBN 978-93-93-95635-78-3

=== Plays directed ===
Year	Play	Produced by	Playwright	Notes	Ref
1996	Ashalin	Ganakrishti	Bratya Basu		
1998	Aranyadeb	Ganakrishti	Bratya Basu		
2001	Chatushkon	Ganakrishti	Bratya Basu		
2001	Shahar Yaar	Ganakrishti	Bratya Basu		
2003	Virus M	Ganakrishti	Bratya Basu		
2004	Sateroi July	Ganakrishti	Bratya Basu	Inspired by John Wexley's 'They shall not die' and Utpal Dutta's 'Manusher Adhikare'	
2005	Page 4:It's also a Game	Lokokrishti	Bratya Basu		
2006	Hemlat:The prince of Garanhata	Ballygunge Swapnasuchona	Bratya Basu	Adaptation of William Shakespeare's 'Hamlet'	
2007	Krishnagawhbar	Niva Arts	Bratya Basu		
2008	Chaturanga	Purba Paschim	Sekhar Samaddar	Adaptation of Tagore's Novel	
2009	Ruddhasangeet	Kalindi Bratyajon	Bratya Basu	Play on Rabindrasangeet exponent Debabrata Biswas	
2010	Kanyadan	Ballygunge Swapnasuchona	Vijay Tendulkar	Translated by Bina Alase	
2010	Canvasser	Kalindi Bratyajon	Short story, written by Bibhutibhushan Bandyopadhyay	Adapted by Sekhar Samaddar	
2011	Byomkesh	Kalindi Bratyajon	Short story, written by Sharadindu Bandyopadhyay	Adapted by Ujjwal Chattopadhyay	
2013	Cinemar Moto	Kalindi Bratyajon	Bratya Basu		
2014	Ke?	Kalindi Bratyajon	Bratya Basu		
2015	Boma	Kalindi Bratyajon	Bratya Basu		
2015	Mumbai Nights	Minerva Repertory Theatre	Debasish Roy	Adaptation of William Shakespeare's 'Twelfth Night'	
2016	Meghe Dhaka Tara	Naihati Bratyajon	Ujjwal Chattopadhyay	Based on the Bengali film, 'Meghe Dhaka Tara', directed by Ritwik Ghatak	
2016	Adya Shesh Rajani	Paikpara Indraranga	Ujjwal Chattopadhyay	Play on late, controversial Actor-Director Ashim Chakraborty	Adya Shesh Rajani ISBN 9789383710461
2017	Ekush Gram	Naihati Bratyajon	Ujjwal Chattopadhyay	Based on the English film, '21 Grams', directed Alejandro Inarritu	
2017	Banijye Basate Lakkhi	Paikpara Indraranga	Bratya Basu		Troyee ISBN 9789350202562
2018	Athoi Jal	Purba Paschim	Ujjwal Chattopadhyay	Adaptation of Bibhutibhushan Bandyopadhyay's novel	
2018	Mir Jafar	Kalindi Bratyajon	Bratya Basu		

=== Plays acted in ===
Year	Play	Role	Produced by	Director	Notes	Ref
1994	Ora Panchjon	Raja	Ganakrishti	Amitabha Dutta	Adaptation of Peter Shaffer's 'Five Finger Exercise'	
1996	Ashalin	Sujan	Ganakrishti	Bratya Basu		
1998	Aranyadeb	Aranyadeb	Ganakrishti	Bratya Basu		
2001	Chatushkon	Soumya Sarkhel	Ganakrishti	Bratya Basu		
2001	Shahar Yaar	Babu	Ganakrishti	Bratya Basu		
2005	Page 4:It's also a Game	Manohar Middya	Lokokrishti	Bratya Basu		
2006	Hemlat:The prince of Garanhata	Hemlat	Ballygunge Swapnasuchona	Bratya Basu	Adaptation of William Shakespeare's 'Hamlet'	
2007	Krishnagawhbar	Angshuman Banerjee	Niva Arts	Bratya Basu		
2009	Ruddhasangeet	Pramod Dasgupta, Santosh Kumar Ghosh	Kalindi Bratyajon	Bratya Basu	Play on Rabindrasangeet exponent Debabrata Biswas	
2010	Kanyadan	Arun Athole	Ballygunge Swapnasuchona	Bratya Basu	Original play by Vijay Tendulkar, translated by Bina Alase	
2013	Cinemar Moto	Abhijit Dutta Gupta	Kalindi Bratyajon	Bratya Basu		
2014	Ke?	Chatak Chattoraj	Kalindi Bratyajon	Bratya Basu	Acted in one show in Mumbai	
2015	Boma	Chittaranjan Das	Kalindi Bratyajon	Bratya Basu		
2015	Mumbai Nights	Guest Appearance	Minerva Repertory Theatre	Bratya Basu	Adaptation of William Shkespeare's play 'Twelfth Night'	
2017	Mulya	Sanjay Choudhury	Ballygunge Bratyajon	Debashish Roy	Adaptation of Arthur Miller's 'The Price', adapted by Asit Mukhopadhyay	
2017	Sateroi July	Rakesh Chatterjee	Thealovers	Debashish Dutta	Inspired by John Wexley's 'They shall not die' and Utpal Dutta's 'Manusher Adhikare'	
2018	Mir Jafar	Robert Clive	Kalindi Bratyajon	Bratya Basu		

== Bibliography ==
=== Novels ===
Year	Title	Title in English	Publisher	Notes	Ref
2022	Adamritakatha	A saga of Ada (Ardhendushekhar Mustafi) and Amrita (Amritalal Basu)	Ananda Publishers	A novel superscribing commercialization of Bengali theatre encircling two stage actors Ardhendushekhar Mustafi and Amritalal Basu with their ever-deepening relationship	ISBN 9789354252372
2023	Dyutakrirak	The Gambler	Ananda Publishers	His second novel encircling one of the most influential theatre artistes of Bengal, Shishir Kumar Bhaduri, theatre artistes Girish Chandra Ghosh who brought a sea change in stage acting in the professional theatre of Bengal	ISBN 9789354254413
2025	Udbasito Mandas	The Floating Raft	Ananda Publishers	His Third novel also encircling one of the most influential theatre artistes of Bengal, Shishir Kumar Bhaduri, who brought a sea change in stage acting in the professional theatre of Bengal	ISBN 978-93-5425-507-6

Prose

Year	Title	Title in English Or Exact Meaning	Publisher	Ref
2025	First Biography on Messi in Bengali Language	Ekti 'Sahityik' Mahakabyer Kissa: Lionel Andres Messi	Dey Book Store	ISBN 978-81-986923-9-9
2025	Biography on Bertolt Brecht	B.B.	Dey Book Store	ISBN 9788198292070

Original poetry

Year	Title	Title in English	Publisher	Notes	Ref
2023	Theatre Bishayak Kabita	Poems in relation to Theatre	Signet Press		ISBN 9789354253119

Translated poetry

Year	Title	Title in English	Publisher	Notes	Ref
2025	Juddher Barnoparichay	War Primer by Bertolt Brecht	Dey Book Store	ISBN 978-81-99064-713	

=== Translated works ===
Year	Title	Language	Edited and/or Translated by	Publisher	Notes	Ref
2013	Hemlat – The Prince of Garanhata	English	Prof. Amitava Roy, Tapu Biswas & Suchandra Ghosh	Avantgarde Press	For Shakespeare Society of Eastern India	ISBN 8187538244
2014	Chatushkon Evam Anya Natak	Hindi	Soma Bandyopadhyay	Rajkamal Prakashan		ISBN 9788126726820
2015	Select Plays in English translation	English	Prof. Amitava Roy, Dr Zinia Mitra, Nirban Manna, Suchandra Ghosh & Abhishek Deb	Deep Prakashan		
2015	Kaun?	Hindi	Mantu Das	Sahitya Bhandar, Allahabad		ISBN 9788177794465
2016	Lakshagriha Evam Anya Natak	Hindi	Soma Bandypadhyay	Rajkamal Prakashan		ISBN 9788126729470
2022	Mir Jafar Evam Anya Natak	Hindi	Pratik Singh, Amber Kumar Chowdhary, Goswami Jainendra Kumar Bharti	Rajkamal Prakashan		ISBN 9789393768094
2023	An Anthology of Contemporary Bengali Plays by Bratya Basu	English	Editors: Sam Kolodezh et al. Translators: Mainak Banerjee and Arnab Banerji	Methuen Drama, Bloomsbury Publishing		ISBN 9781350289451

=== Books written on Bratya Basu ===
Year	Title	English Title	Written by	Edited by	Publisher	Notes	Ref
2013	Astitwa Anubhuti Abinirman : Bratya Basur Natok	Existence, Affect, Deconstruction: Bratya Basu's Play	Shantanu Bandyopadhyay		Patralekha	Reprinted from Deep Prakashan in 2017	
2015	Bratya Basur Natok Theke Natye : Natun Shatabdir Antarghat	Bratya Basu's Play to Production: A rencounter of a new century	Shampa Bhattacharjee		Deep Prakashan		ISBN 9789384561246
2017	Sakkhatkar Sangraha	A collection of Interviews		Kingshuk Mondal	Kolikata Letterpress		ISBN 9788193264027
2017	Bratya ebong Bratya	Bratya and Bratya		Mainak Bandyopadhyay	Deep Prakashan		
2020	Kshamata Sanglap Ekok Pradarshani : Bratya Basur Natyabhuban	Power, Dialogue - A Unique Spectacle : Theatrical world of Bratya Basu	Arnab Saha		Apan Path		ISBN 9788194092988
2021	Anek Kamala Ranger Rod : Bratyabrata Basu	A Wide Spread of Orange Sunshine: Bratyabrata Basu		Soumitra Mitra	Purba Paschim		
2022	Bratya : Bohumukhi Protibhabidyut	Bratya : A man of versatile intellect	Joy Goswami		Karigar		ISBN 9789393669131
2022	Bratyajug : Darpane Bimbito Alo	Bratya : An Epoch-making Radiance of Light		Arnab Saha	Saptarshi Prakashan		ISBN 9789390830237

== Filmography ==
=== Directorial venture ===
Year	Title	Cast	Citations
2003	Rasta	Mithun Chakraborty, Rajatava Dutta, Amitabh Bhattacharjee, Rimjhim Gupta, Raghuvir Yadav, Alakananda Ray, Dolon Ray, Soma Dey, Alaka Gangopadhyay, Deb Shankar Halder	
2005	Teesta	Debashree Roy, Badshah Moitra, Chandrayee Ghosh, Pijush Ganguly, Sudip Mukherjee, Biswajit Chakraborty, Sreela Majumdar, Lily Chakraborty	
2010	Tara	Prosenjit Chatterjee, Paoli Dam, Tota Roy Chowdhury, Bratya Basu, Goutam Halder, Parthasarathi Deb, Piya Sengupta	
2021	Dictionary	Abir Chatterjee, Nusrat Jahan, Mosharraf Karim, Poulami Basu, Arno Mukhopadhyay	
2024	Hubba	Mosharraf Karim, Indraneil Sengupta, Poulami Basu and others	
2026	Shekor	Seema Biswas, Chanchal Chowdhury, Loknath Dey, Riddhi sen, Angana Roy, Kunal Ghosh, Narayan Goswami and Others	

=== Films acted in ===
Year	Film	Role	Directors	Ref
2005	Herbert	Dhanna	Suman Mukhopadhyay	
2009	Sthanio Sangbad	Mr. Paul	Mainak Biswas and Arjun Gourisaria	
2009	Kaalbela	Ramen	Goutam Ghose	
2011	Hello Memshaheb	Mr. Menon	Shibaprasad Mukhopadhyay and Nandita Roy	
2011	Icche	Manas	Shibaprasad Mukhopadhyay and Nandita Roy	
2011	Kagojer Bou	Manik Saha	Bappaditya Bandyopadhyay	
2012	Tin Kanya		Agnidev Chattopadhyay	
2012	Muktodhara	Arindam	Shibaprasad Mukhopadhyay and Nandita Roy	
2012	Hemlock Society	Raktim Ganguly	Srijit Mukherji	
2012	Balukabela.com	Shubhankar	Partha Sen	
2013	Sunglass		Rituparno Ghosh	
2013	Mahapurush O Kapurush	Shri Shri Sadgajananda Maharaj/Pada	Aniket Chattopadhyay	
2013	Golemale Pirit Koro Na	Nebu Kaka	Anindya Bandyopadhyay	
2014	Parapar	Gopal	Sanjoy Nag	
2015	Jogajog	Madhusudan	Sekhar Das	
2015	Natoker Moto	Amitesh	Debesh Chattopadhyay	
2015	Kalkijug	ACP Dilip Dutta	Debarati Gupta	
2015	Abby Sen	Niladri	Atanu Ghosh	
2016	Double Feluda	Manimohan Samaddar	Sandip Ray	
2016	Gangster	Jamal	Birsa Dasgupta	
2016	Asamapto	Malay	Suman Mukhopadhyay	
2017	Chilekotha	Phulu Kaka	Premangshu Roy	
2017	Baranda	Girijapati	Reshmi Mitra	
2018	Manojder Adbhut Bari	Goenda Baradacharan	Anindya Chatterjee	
2019	Bahoman	Subrata	Anumita Dasgupta	
2019	Dhulobali Katha	Rajaditya Mullick	Biplab Bandyopadhyay	
2019	The Lovely Mrs. Mookherjee	Kalidas Mukhopadhyay/Bratya	Indranil Roychowdhury	
2021	Mayar Janjal	Ganesh Samanta	Indranil Roychowdhury	
2025	Chalchittro	Bhuban Haldar	Pratim D.Gupta	
2025	Lawho Gouranger Naam Rey	Girish Chandra Ghosh	Srijit Mukherji	
2025	Korpur	Rakhohari	Arindam Sil	

=== Television series acted in ===
Year	Title	Role	Directors	Channel	Citations
2006	Probahini Ei Somoy	Bhaskar	Abhijit Dasgupta	Akash Bangla	
2007	Sonar Harin	Panu Halder	Saibal Banerjee	E TV	
2009	Agnipariksha	Sashanka Debroy	Sudipto Das	Zee TV	
2010	Dibaratrir Galpo	Bhaskar	Tathagata Banerjee	E TV	

== Awards and recognitions ==
=== Theatre ===
Year	Award / Recognition	Conferred by	Milestone	Citations
2000	Shyamal Sen Smriti Samman	Swapnasandhani	Notable contribution in Benagli Theatre	
2000	Dishari Samman	B.F.J.A.	Contribution in Bengali Theatre	
2001	Satyen Mitra Puraskar	Theatre Workshop	Outstanding contribution in Bengali Theatre	
2003	Satyen Mitra Puraskar	Theatre Workshop	Memorable contribution in Bengali Theatre	
2004	Satyen Mitra Puraskar	Theatre Workshop	Prominent contribution in Bengali Theatre	
2014	Banglar Gourab	Zee Bangla	Contribution in Bengali Theatre	
2016	Mohit Samman	Rangapat	Exemplary contribution in Bengali Theatre	
2017	Satyen Mitra Puraskar	Theatre Workshop	Outstanding contribution to Bengali Theatre	
2018	Prachya Samman	Prachya	Contribution in Bengali Theatre	
2018	Dronacharya Samman	Ashoknagar Natyamukh	Special Award for Outstanding Contributions to Bengali Theatre	
2019	Shera Bangali	ABP Group	Remarkable contribution in Theatrical Art form	
2019	Dinabandhu Mitra Puraskar	Paschim Banga Natya Akademi, Department of Information and Cultural Affairs, Govt. of WB	In recognition of his distinctiveness as a playwright, an actor and a stage director in contemporary times	
2021	Manthan Jibankriti Samman	Jadavpur Manthan	Lifetime Achievement Award	
2021	SAHITYA AKADEMI AWARD	Ministry of Culture, Government of India	For his Book, Mir Jafar O Onyanya Natak	
2022	Saraswati Natya Samman	Netaji Nagar Saraswati Natyashala	An award for the best litterateur, theatre and film personality of the year	
2025	Nabajagaran Samman	Ajkal Patrika	Outstanding contribution to Bengali Theatre	
2025	Natadha-Bisesh-Samman	Natadha	Outstanding contribution to Bengali Theatre	

=== Cinema ===
Year	Award / Recognition	Conferred by	Milestone	Citations
2017	Ritwik Ghatak Smriti Puroskar	Rajshahi Ritwik Ghatak Memorial Committee, Republic of Bangladesh	Notable contribution in Benagli Cinema	
2017	Jury Award for Best Actor - Male	Hyderabad 'Bengali' Film Festival	Outstanding performance in the film, Asamapta	
2018	Special Jury Award	26th Annual Kalakar Awards	Outstanding performance in the film, Baranda	
2019	B.F.J.A. Award for Best Actor in a Comic Role	B.F.J.A.	Best Acting in a Comic Role in the film, Manojder Adbhut Bari	
2019	Jury Award for Best Supporting Actor - Male	Telangana 'Bengali' Film Festival	Best Supporting acting in the film, Bahaman	
2019	100 Greatest Performances of the Decade	Film Companion, an online platform for Independent Film Journalism, India	Superlative performance as 'Malay' in the film, Asamapta	
2021	Goutam Buddha Award	Nepal International Film Festival 2021	Best International Feature Film Award for the film, Dictionary, directed by him	

== Political career ==
Bratya Basu won the West Bengal Assembly polls in 2011 on a Trinamool Congress ticket against a CPI(M) Minister, Gautam Deb, from the Dum Dum (Vidhan Sabha constituency). He was made Minister for Higher Education in Mamata Banerjee's cabinet. He decided to launch a survey of the state's higher education situation for clarification purposes. Basu was brought back as Education Minister after Trinamool Congress's substantial win at 2021 Assembly Election.
