= 90 Ghanta =

2008 Indian Bengali film

- Promotional poster
- Directed by: Sougata Roy Burman
- Produced by: Morpheus Media Ventures
- Starring: Tota Roy Choudhury; Jisshu Sengupta; Swastika Mukherjee
- Music by: Deb Chowdhury
- Release date: 1 February 2008
- Running time: 120 minutes
- Country: India
- Language: Bengali

90 Ghanta (transl. 90 Hours) is a 2008 Indian Bengali-language psycho-thriller film directed by Sougata Roy Burman. The film stars Jishu Sengupta, Tota Roy Choudhury, and Swastika Mukherjee. The film was produced by Morpheus Media Ventures.

== Plot ==
This film has a strikingly different storyline. It tells the tale of George, Rishin Sen and his wife Mayuri who is a journalist at Kolkata TV. When George takes up a contract killing assignment from Rishin Sen, he doesn't know his target and client was the same person. Rishin Sen is a schizophrenic businessman who wants himself dead. On realising this, George is torn between his professional ethics and a genuine concern for a fellow human being. Things get complicated when George discovers that Rishin's wife Mayuri is his ex-girlfriend. Mayuri tries to convince him against killing her husband. Meanwhile, George and Rishin have also bonded over a common passion, music.At the end george and his recent girlfriend killed by each other.

== Cast ==
- Tota Roy Choudhury as George
- Jisshu Sengupta as Rishin Sen
- Swastika Mukherjee as Mayuri Sen, journalist of Kolkata TV
- Santu Mukherjee
- Partho Banerjee
- Yana Gupta as item
- Manjusree Ganguly as George's new girlfriend

== Soundtrack ==
No.	Title	Singer(s)	Length
1.	"Amar Kancha Pirit ("	Miss Jojo
2.	"Chal Moyuri Chal Hariye Jai"	Rupankar Bagchi
3.	"Mon Bujhe Achho Keno"	Srikanto Acharya
4.	"Sunno Sunno Mahasunno"

== Reception ==
Shoma from Sifymovies said that 90 Hours is filled with chills and thrills. He went on to say that the film is "slickly made" with some outstanding performances. A different opinion from the telegraph noted that "90 Ghanta has a smart script but falls short of becoming dark, sinister and unsettling due to poor directorial skills."
