= Curzoner Kalom =

2017 Bengali film

Curzoner Kalom (The Pen of Curzon) is a Bengali thriller drama film directed by Souvik Mitra and produced by Pawan Kanodia. The film was released on 3 November 2017 under the banner of AVA Film Productions.

== Plot ==
Lord Curzon gifted his historical pen to a Bengali zamindar in 1905. It is a valuable item with a 10 carat diamond. Curzon signed for the Partition of Bengal in 1905 with this pen which was lost later from the zamindar's family. Papu, an amateur detective, and her boyfriend Tutu decide to find the pen from a hidden place before the Durga puja. But a few other people are also trying to capture the pen.

== Cast ==
- Paran Banerjee as Jota Mama
- Kharaj Mukherjee as Monohar
- Kushal Chakraborty as Shoumya
- Lily Chakravarty as Ranga Pishi
- Saheb Bhattacharya as Tutu
- Kanchan Mullick as Gunodhar
- Pushpita Mukherjee as Soumi
- Debdut Ghosh as Shubho
- Adrija Ghosh as Beni
- Poulomi Das as Papu
- Mallika Ghosh as Mili
- Sumit Samaddar as Gobu
