= Bratyajon =

Theatre group in West Bengal, India

- Bratyajon group logo
- Type: Theatre group
- Location: Kolkata, West Bengal, India
- Artistic director: Bratya Basu
- Website: http://www.bratyajon.org/

Bratyajon is a Bengali theatre group of Kolkata, West Bengal, India.

== History ==
The director of the group Bratyajon is Bratya Basu. The first play staged by Bratyojon was Ruddhasangeet (2009). In August 2012, the opened 4 franchisees in West Bengal. In November 2013, Bratyajan opened 7 franchisees.

== Productions ==
- Ruddhasangeet (2009)
- Canvasser (2010)
- Byomkesh (2011)
- Sinemar Moto(2013)
- Ke? (2014)
- Boma (2015)
