= Feludar Goyendagiri =

TV series

- Release poster
- Genre: Thriller
- Created by: Srijit Mukherji
- Based on: Feluda by Satyajit Ray
- Written by: Satyajit Ray
- Screenplay by: Srijit Mukherji
- Directed by: Srijit Mukherji
- Starring: Tota Roy Choudhury; Kalpan Mitra; Anirban Chakrabarty
- Composer: Joy Sarkar
- Country of origin: India
- Original language: Bengali
- No. of seasons: 3
- No. of episodes: 19

Production
- Cinematography: Ramyadip Saha
- Running time: 25-35 minutes
- Production company: SVF Entertainment

Original release
- Release: 17 June 2022

Related
- Feluda Pherot

Feludar Goyendagiri is an Indian streaming television series, directed by Srijit Mukherji. It is based on the stories of the Bengali sleuth Feluda, written by Satyajit Ray. Originally known as Feluda Pherot and streaming on Addatimes, the show began streaming on Hoichoi from 17 June 2022.

== Cast ==
- Tota Roy Chowdhury as Prodosh Chandra Mitra or Feluda
- Kalpan Mitra as Topesh Ranjan Mitra or Topshe
- Anirban Chakrabarty as Lalmohan Ganguly or Jatayu

=== Chhinnamastar Abhishap (Addatimes) ===
- Dhritiman Chatterjee as Mahesh Chowdhury
- Arindam Ganguly as Arunendra Chowdhury
- Samadarshi Dutta as Pritindra Chowdhury
- Poulomi Das as Neelima Debi
- Krishnendu Deowanoji as Shankarlal
- Rishi Kaushik as Biren Karandikar
- Adrija Dutta as Bibi

=== Jawto Kando Kathmandute (Addatimes) ===
- Kharaj Mukherjee as Maganlal Meghraj
- Bharat Kaul as Anantalal Batra

=== Darjeeling Jawmjawmat (Hoichoi) ===
- Barun Chanda as Birupakkho Majumdar
- Suprobhat Das as Samiran Majumdar
- Loknath Dey as Inspector Jotish Saha
- Saheb Bhattacharya as Rajen Raina or V. Balaporiya
- Rahul Banerjee as Pulak Ghoshal
- Subrat Dutta as Mahadev Verma
- Munmun Roy as Suchandra
- Indrasish Roy as Young Birupakkho Majumdar (Guest Appearance)
- Mainak Banerjee as Rajat Bose or Ramen Brahmo
- Phalguni Chatterjee as Harinarayan Mukherjee
- Subhankar Ghatak as Loknath Beyara

== Feluda Pherot ==
=== Mukherji's playwright days ===
In April 2008, during his playwright times, Mukherji formed his own troupe, Pandora's Act, whose first production, Feluda Pherot! at Rangashankara in July 2008 was a runaway success. It was the first ever non-canonical dramatisation of Satyajit Ray's sleuth Feluda. Barun Chanda, Ray's leading man in Seemabodhho, and Parambrata Chatterjee, the screen Topshe and film youth icon, starred in this production. Chanda was later cast in a supporting role in the 1st season of Feludar Goyendagiri.

=== Addatimes series ===
In 2020, during the trailer launch event of the web series Feluda Pherot, Rajiv Mehra, the founder of Addatimes, said that, after bringing Parambrata Chatterjee's modern-day adaptation of Feluda from Bioscope to Addatimes, he was skeptical about people's acceptance of the new avatar. While discussing the project of doing a new Feluda series, Srijit Mukherji showed his interest in directing it.

The first season, based on the story Chinnamastar Abhishap, was released on Christmas 2020. The trailer of the second season, Jawto Kando Kathmandute, was released simultaneously with the first season trailer and was also announced to arrive on Christmas 2020 but was later postponed to Christmas 2021 and then, was postponed indefinitely.

=== Moved to Hoichoi ===
In the Hoichoi season 5 catalogue, the platform hinted at bringing the series to their platform. The formal announcement was made on 15 April 2022, in their new content catalogue. A special promo was released on 1 May 2022, celebrating Ray's birth anniversary.

== Marketing and release ==
The series was announced as part of Hoichoi's new content catalogue on 15 April 2022, on the occasion of Bengali New Year. A promo was launched on 1 May 2022, coinciding with Satyajit Ray's birthday.

The official trailer was launched on 1 June 2022. The series is set to stream from 17 June onwards.

== Season 1 ==
=== Production ===
The shooting of the first season began in Darjeeling in March 2022 and was finished within 16 days. The series is based on Darjeeling Jawmjawmat.

=== Episodes ===
No.	Title	Directed by	Screenplay by	Original release date
1	"Dhundhumar Darjeeling"	Srijit Mukherji	Srijit Mukherji	17 June 2022
Pulak Ghoshal, a film director from Hindi film industry, had previously directed a film based on one of Lalmohan's stories on Prokhor Rudra. After the success of the film, Ghoshal fulfills his promise of adapting another Prokhor Rudra story on screen. However, instead of shooting in Karakoram where the story was set, the team starts shooting in Darjeeling. On Ghoshal's invitation, Feluda, Topshe and Lalmohan reach Darjeeling. The trio meet Birupakkho Majumdar, the man whose house would feature the indoor shots of the film, during a stroll in the Darjeeling Mall. Briupakkho has a keen interest in collecting the paper cutting of crimes, which also has Feluda interested.
2	"Birupakkho Brittanto"	Srijit Mukherji	Srijit Mukherji	17 June 2022
Birupakhkho Majumdar reveals some uncanny facts about his life, while showing the paper cutting collection to the trio. On the other side, Pulak Ghoshal makes Lalmohan an unusual but tempting offer to make a guest appearance in the film, due to lack of extras.
3	"Shooting-ey Shihoron"	Srijit Mukherji	Srijit Mukherji	17 June 2022
During the shooting, Lalmohan overhears Birupakhkho berating someone. During the shooting, Birupakkho is murdered and the precious Krishna statue in his room is also found missing.
4	"Taalmaatal Tawdonto"	Srijit Mukherji	Srijit Mukherji	17 June 2022
Feluda detects some crucial clues at the crime scene and also gets to know about Birupakhkho's dark past. While strolling around the zoo, an unknown man pushes Feluda off a cliff.
5	"Himalaye Hotyakando"	Srijit Mukherji	Srijit Mukherji	17 June 2022
While having a medical treatment, Feluda gets to know about the strained relationships in Majumdar family from Birupakhkho's former doctor. While Feluda interrogates the suspects, Topshe and Lalmohan discover something startling in the jungle.
6	"Jawmjawmat Jawbonika"	Srijit Mukherji	Srijit Mukherji	17 June 2022
Feluda is all set to close the case but runs towards Siliguri when he gets to know about Birupakhkho's son's departure to Kolkata. He catches him and brings him back to the villa. Feluda rounds up all those with both motive and opportunity for murder and unmasks everyone one by one. Rajat Bose, Majumdar's secretary, was none other than Romen Brahmo, the son of a man who was accidentally killed by Majumdar in the past and later covered up the news. The treacherous Bengal Bank worker, V. Balaporia, was none other than the actor Rajen, who killed Majumdar so as to stop his dark past from getting unveiled. The Krishna statue was stolen by Samiran, who did so as to recover his losses from the stock market. At the end, Ghoshal announces Rajen's elimination from the film and also that he would be directing four new films next year. Feluda jokingly calls him "ABCD- Asia's Busiest Cinema Director".

== Music ==
The music and background score is composed by Joy Sarkar.

The title song for Feluda Pherot, which is a recreation of Satyajit Ray's legendary theme for Feluda, is sung by Rupam Islam, Rupankar Bagchi and Anupam Roy.

The title song for Feludar Goyendagiri, which is also a recreation of Satyajit Ray's legendary theme for Feluda, is sung by Sidhu, Shilajit and Anindya Chattopadhyay.

All lyrics are written by Srijato.

Feluda Pherot
No.	Title	Artist(s)	Length
1.	"Feluda Pherot Title Track"	Rupam Islam, Rupankar Bagchi, Anupam Roy	02:39

All lyrics are written by Srijato.

Feludar Goyendagiri
No.	Title	Artist(s)	Length
1.	"Feludar Goyendagiri Title Track"	Sidhu, Silajit Majumder, Anindya Chattopadhyay	02:39
