= Tara (2010 film) =

2010 Indian Bengali film

- Release poster
- Directed by: Bratya Basu
- Starring: Prosenjit Chatterjee; Paoli Dam; Tota Ray Chowdhury; Bratyo Basu; Goutam Halder; Parthasarathi Deb; Piya Sengupta
- Music by: Rabindranath Tagore; Tapan Sinha
- Production company: Shree Venkatesh Films
- Release date: 5 November 2010
- Country: India
- Language: Bengali

Tara is a 2010 Bengali drama film directed and produced by Bratya Basu.This film was released on 5 November 2010 under the banner Shree Venkatesh Films. The film's music was composed by Tapan Sinha and Rabindranath Tagore.

== Cast ==
- Paoli Dam
- Tota Ray Chowdhury
- Bratya Basu
- Goutam Halder
- Prosenjit Chatterjee
- Parthasarathi Deb
- Piya Sengupta

== Soundtrack ==
#	Title	Singer(s)	Music
1	"Megh Jome Aachhe"	Ustad Rashid Khan	Tapan Sinha
2	"Bhabo Ekbar"	Rupankar	Tapan Sinha
3	"Mone Ki Dwidha" (Male)	Srikanta Acharya	Rabindranath Tagore
4	"Mone Porchhe Tomay"	Rupankar, Sumana	Tapan Sinha
5	"Du Mutho Bhat"	Rupam Islam	Tapan Sinha
6	"Mone Ki Dwidha" (Female)	Lopamudra Mitra	Rabindranath Tagore
