= Saheb Bhattacharya =

Indian actor

Shaheb Bhattacharya
- Born: Soumya Bhattacherjee; 17 November 1985 (age 41); Calcutta, West Bengal, India
- Occupation: Actor
- Years active: 1994 - present
- Father: Subrata Bhattacharya

Shaheb Bhattacharya (or Bhattacharjee) is an Indian actor who is known for his work in Bengali cinema. He made his debut with Anjan Choudhary's Abbajan (1994). He has since appeared in films such as Lathi (1996), Gorosthane Sabdhan (2010), Iti Mrinalini (2011), Royal Bengal Rahasya (2011), Bheetu (2015), Romantic Noy (2016), Double Feluda (2016), Curzoner Kalom (2017), Uraan and Oskar

== Personal life ==
Shaheb Bhattacharya was born on 17th November 1985 in Kolkata, West Bengal to Subrata Bhattacharya, an Indian and Mohun Bagan footballer.

== Career ==
Shaheb Bhattacharya started his career in 2008 with the TV series Ei Ghar Ei Sansar. He made his film debut in Gorosthane Sabdhan in 2010. Later, he appeared in films like Iti Mrinalini and Bheetu. He gained success on the big screen as Topshe in the Feluda films. He played the role of Topshe in Gorosthane Sabdhan (2010), Royal Bengal Rahasya (2011) and Double Feluda (2016).

On Television, he acted in Kakababu Firey Elen on DD Bangla and Tahar Namti Ranjana (directed by Rituparno Ghosh).

== Filmography ==
Key
†	Denotes films that have not yet been released

Year	Film	Role	Notes	Ref.
1994	Abbajan		Marked his debut feature film	
1995	Sangharsha			
1996	Lathi			
1996	Mukhyamantri			
1997	Bidroho			
2002	Chhelebela			
2010	Jodi Ekdin	Magician		
2010	Royal Bengal Rahashya	Topshe		
2010	Iti Mrinalini	Abhijeet Mukherjee / Naxalite		
2010	Gorosthaney Sabdhan	Topshe		
2011	Ami Shubhash Bolchi	Rahul Bose		
2011	Someday Somewhere...Jete Pari Chole	Chiring Thapa		
2012	Damadol	Nikhil		
2012	Chittagong	Sukhendu	Hindi film	
2012	Joker	Jeetu		
2013	Half Serious			
2014	Khaad	Jit		
2014	Shudhuei Anubhab			
2014	Bristi Bheja Roddur			
2015	Aro Ekbar	Arko		
2015	Bheetu	Andy		
2015	Ichchhemotir Gappo	Rupam		
2015	Not a Dirty Film	Hero		
2015	Daker Saaj			
2016	Double Feluda	Topshe		
2016	Romantic Noy	Shekhar		
2017	Baranda	Ambar		
2017	Curzoner Kalom	Tatu/Tutu		
2017	Hothat Dekha			
2018	Atithi	Aftab Rehman		
2018	Aatwaja			
2018	Kuchh Bheege Alfaaz	Partho	Hindi film	
2018	Oskar	Ratul Chattopadhyay		
2019	Uraan	Romit Chatterjee/Amal		
2019	Mukhomukhi	Young Sounak		
2019	Daab Chingri	Rishi		
2019	Saat No. Shanatan Sanyal			
2020	Detective	Manmothanath		
2020	The Complete Life			
2020	Karma	Siddharth Mullick		
2021	Syndicate			
2022	Woman Power	Ajay		
2022	Shimanto			
2022	Mahishasur Marddini	Army Major		
2022	Chakra	Mahendra		
2023	Aaro Ek Prithibi	Aritra Chatterjee		
2023	Nishachar	Investigation officer Anshuman Rana		
2025	Oporichito	Aranya		
2025	Chandrabindoo	Sanjay		
2025	Grihostho	Ananda		
2025	Tobu Bhalobashi	Gullu Dada		

== Web Series ==
Year	Web Series	Role	OTT Platform	Notes	Ref.
2018	Dark Web	Aranya	Hoichoi		
2019	Paap	Chhoton Chowdhury	Hoichoi		
2020	Bonyo Premer Golpo	Subrata	Hoichoi		
2021	Hai Taubba	Dhruv	Alt Balaji		
2021	Hello! 3	Rongi	Hoichoi		
2022	Feludar Goyendagiri — Darjeeling Jawmjawmat	Rajendra Raina/Vishnudas Balaporiya	Hoichoi		
2023	Shwetkali	Palash	Zee5		

== Television ==
Year	Show	Channel	Role
2005	Meghbalika	ETV Bangla	
2008	Bandhan	Star Jalsha	
2008-2009	Neer Bhanga Jhor	Star Jalsha	
2008-2009	Kakababu Firey Elen	DD Bangla	Sunanda Roy Chowdhury/Santu
2009	Sholo Aana	ETV Bangla	
2009	Ei Ghar Ei Sansar	Zee Bangla	
2020	Lockdown Diary - Golpo Holeo Satti	Zee Bangla	Bhuban (Episode 36)
2023 - 2025	Kothha	Star Jalsha	Agnibha Guha/Agni/AV
2026 - Present	Ganga	Star Jalsha	Arjun Chatterjee
