= Baksho Rahashya (novel) =

Book by Satyajit Ray

Baksho Rahasya (Incident on the Kalka Mail)
- Baksho Rahasya book cover.
- Author: Satyajit Ray
- Cover artist: Satyajit Ray
- Language: Bengali
- Genre: Detective fiction
- Publisher: Ananda Publishers
- Publication date: 1972
- Publication place: India
- Media type: Print
- Preceded by: Sonar Kella
- Followed by: Samaddarer Chabi

Bakso Rahashya (English title : Incident on the Kalka Mail) is a Bengali novel by Satyajit Ray featuring the private detective Feluda. This novel was first serialized in Desh magazine in 1972 and then released in book form in 1973, by Ananda publishers.

== Plot summary ==
Private investigator Prodosh C. Mitter a.k.a. Feluda is approached by a rich businessman named Dinanath Lahiri who tasks Feluda with a seemingly simple case: while returning from Delhi via the Kalka Mail, Lahiri's attaché case inadvertently got exchanged with another passenger's bag. Lahiri wants Feluda to find the owner of the briefcase which he has right now, give the briefcase to him and bring back his original briefcase. After giving a detailed description of the rest of the passengers of his compartment, Lahiri leaves.

The people, who were in Lahiri's compartment, are Naresh C. Pakrashi, an established businessman like Lahiri, Brijmohan Kedia, a businessman and the owner of his own company, and G. C. Dhameeja. After some careful searching, Feluda finds out that Lahiri's briefcase got exchanged with Dhameeja's briefcase. During this time, Feluda meets with Pakrashi and learns about the other two men in the train compartment i.e., Dhameeja and Kedia. That evening, Feluda and his cousin Tapesh Ranjan Mitter a.k.a. Topshe go to Lahiri's house and meet with Lahiri's cousin Prabeer Lahiri, a struggling actor who's obsessed with his own thin voice and who dislikes Lahiri. After telling everything to Lahiri, Lahiri decides that Feluda should go to Shimla, the place where Dhameeja lives, in order to exchange the briefcases. Feluda agrees to it. The duo return home, only to find Lalmohan Ganguly a.k.a. Jatayu waiting for them. After some aimless conversation, Lalmohan Babu hears everything about Feluda's new case and also about his prospective tour to Shimla. The excited Lalmohan Babu asks to join them; Feluda agrees to it.

That night, Feluda gets a call from Lahiri who informs him that Dhameeja, before leaving for Shimla, has left Lahiri's briefcase with his associate Mr. Puri and that Mr. Puri is eager to make the briefcase exchange that same night. After obtaining Mr. Puri's address, Feluda and Topshe go to the place which is quite lonely. While looking for Mr. Puri's house, the duo are attacked by two muscular thugs who tackle Feluda and Topshe to the ground, snatch the briefcase and flee from there. Thankfully, the briefcase which Feluda carried with him and which the thugs snatched away was a decoy and the actual briefcase is in his house; Feluda was actually suspicious about the whole deal regarding Mr. Puri. He finally comes to terms with the fact that there's more to this case than what meets the eye.

The next day, while Feluda is out to make some arrangements, Topshe calls a film production house to get some info regarding Lahiri's cousin Prabeer; he finds out, much to his surprise that Prabeer isn't acting anymore. Just a few minutes after that, Topshe receives a threat call from an unknown person, who warns him not to go to Shimla. That night, while Feluda and Topshe are planning to go to bed, Pakrashi arrives to meet with them; he demands that Feluda should hand over the manuscript to him which was in Lahiri's briefcase (there was a valuable manuscript inside Lahiri's briefcase, titled A Bengalee In Lamaland written by Bengali explorer and author Shambhu Charan Bose) and he offers money for it. Feluda declines Pakrashi's offer and refuses his money and bids him goodnight.

The next day, the trio fly to Delhi where they stay in a hotel for the day, as their train to Shimla is in that evening. While Topshe and Lalmohan Babu go out for a tour around the city, an unknown man arrives in their hotel, meets with Feluda, knocks him unconscious and steals the briefcase. In the meantime, another unknown man follows Topshe and Lalmohan Babu while they're roaming outside. They return to the hotel and find the unconscious Feluda on the floor and the briefcase gone. They revive Feluda and he decides to buy a new briefcase (or steal one, if necessary) and fill it up with all the things which were inside Dhameeja's briefcase which has now been stolen. During all of this, Lalmohan Babu finds a threat letter in his jacket pocket, which is warning the trio not to go to Shimla.

That evening, while on their way to Shimla by train, the trio discover a diamond stuck inside a Kodak film roll container which they had during this entire time. Feluda now understands that the thugs are actually trying to steal the Kodak film roll container because of the diamond. Later that night, Topshe suddenly wakes up from his sleep, only to see an unknown man (the same man who followed him and Lalmohan Babu in Delhi) trying to break in their compartment but the man gives up and escapes after Lalmohan Babu shouts in his sleep.

After arriving in the snow-covered Shimla, the trio stay in a hotel. While having lunch, Lalmohan Babu shows the other two a new weapon that he has brought from his collection: a boomerang. That afternoon, the trio set out for their mission; they soon arrive at Dhameeja's house. They give the briefcase to him and get Lahiri's briefcase in return, but they find no manuscript inside. Feluda is in shock. While returning to their hotel, an empty car blocks the road. When everyone goes out to inspect, an unknown man attacks the group and starts shooting at everyone. The man, revealed to be Prabeer, asks Feluda to throw the diamond to him, while holding him at gunpoint. After a series of clever confrontations, Prabeer is finally caught. After the Lahiris discovered Shambhu Charan's box in their house, Prabeer found the diamond and planned to earn money by selling it. So he secretly hid it in the Kodak film roll container and kept it in the briefcase. After Lahiri took the briefcase to Feluda in order to return it to Dhameeja, Prabeer became desperate to retrieve the diamond and employed thugs to retrieve it. When Feluda starts describing the punishment that he'll face, Prabeer tries to escape, only to be knocked out by Lalmohan Babu when he hurls his boomerang at him.

After getting Prabeer arrested and calling Lahiri to take Prabeer back, the trio return to their hotel, where they come across the unknown man who followed them till Shimla. The man is Pakrashi who reveals that he's the one who orchestrated the "accidental" briefcase exchange in the Kalka Mail. He also reveals that he stole Shambhu Charan's manuscript from Lahiri's briefcase in the Kalka Mail and was copying it, intending to publish it and become famous. Pakrashi going to Feluda and offering to buy the manuscript was actually a ruse to pretend that he doesn't have the manuscript. The story ends with Pakrashi giving the actual manuscript to Feluda (now that he has copied it) and Feluda thanking him in return.

== Adaptations ==
Bakso Rahashya was adapted into a radio play starring Soumitra Chatterjee as Feluda and broadcast on Indian radio while Ray was still alive, with his supervision and with background music of his composition. Later the play was released in cassettes by His Master's Voice.

In 1996 on the 30th anniversary of Feluda's first appearance, Sandip Ray (Satyajit's son) has made a telefilm of the same name with a new set of actors where Sabyasachi Chakrabarty played Feluda's role.

Sunday Suspense, a YouTube based podcast channel created by 98.3 Mirchi made a podcast based on Baksho Rahasya starring Sabyasachi Chakraborty as Feluda, Somak Ghosh as Topesh and Jagannath Basu as Lalmohan Ganguly. Other roles were played by RJ Deep, RJ Richard and RJ Agni.
