= Villain (2013 film) =

2013 Indian Bengali film

Villain 2013
- Directed by: Tota Roy Chowdhury
- Written by: Tota Roy Chowdhury and Arindam Guha
- Produced by: Trident Lord Pictures
- Starring: Tota Roy Chowdhury; Rituparna Sengupta; Barkha Bisht Sengupta; Laboni Sarkar; Rajatava Dutta
- Cinematography: Biswajit
- Music by: Gora; Siddhartha; Subhadeep Mukherjee; Lyrics; Sanjeev Tiwari (Songs); Bholey Baba; Shundori Komola
- Release date: 5 October 2013
- Country: India
- Language: Bengali
- Budget: ₹0.5 crore (US$59,000)

Villain is a 2013 Indian Bengali-language vigilante action film written and directed by Tota Roy Choudhury in his directional debut. The film stars Tota Roy Chowdhury and Rituparna Sengupta.Tota Roy Choudhury made his debut by this film under his home production Trident Lord. The film was released on 5 October 2013.

== Plot ==
Arnab is an honest and upright PWD road inspector. Things take a turn after a local MLA and his henchmen frame corruption charge against him and send him to jail for not co-operating with them. Meanwhile, his wife also gets killed. A victimized and vigilante Arnab plans for a mission to avenge the culprits who changed his life.

== Cast ==
- Tota Roy Chowdhury as Arnab Dey aka Nobi - A Government employee turned a dreaded gangster.
- Rituparna Sengupta as Anjali Dey - Arnab's Wife
- Barkha Sengupta as Meherunnisa aka Laila - Sultan's assistant and a gangster, Arnab's love interest.
- Rishi Kaushik as ADC Debashish Roy - Additional Commissioner of Special Crime Branch. After Arnab's encounter, He take resign from service.
- Rajatava Dutta as local MLA Shivshankar Paja - Raju's elder brother, Arnab's enemy.
- Laboni Sarkar as Landlady Anupama Dey
- Biswajit Chakraborty as CP Binayak Sen - Commissioner of police, Debashish's Senior.
- Sagnik Chatterjee as Rajshankar Paja - Shivshankar's younger brother.
- Sudip Mukherjee as Mafia Don Sultan Bhai - prisoner in Jail who later helped Arnab.
- Sumit Ganguly as OC Satya Das
- Rajat Ganguly as Jailor
- Shantanu Das
- Arijit Roy
- Suraj Sheikh
