= Tota Roy Chowdhury =

Indian actor (born 1976)

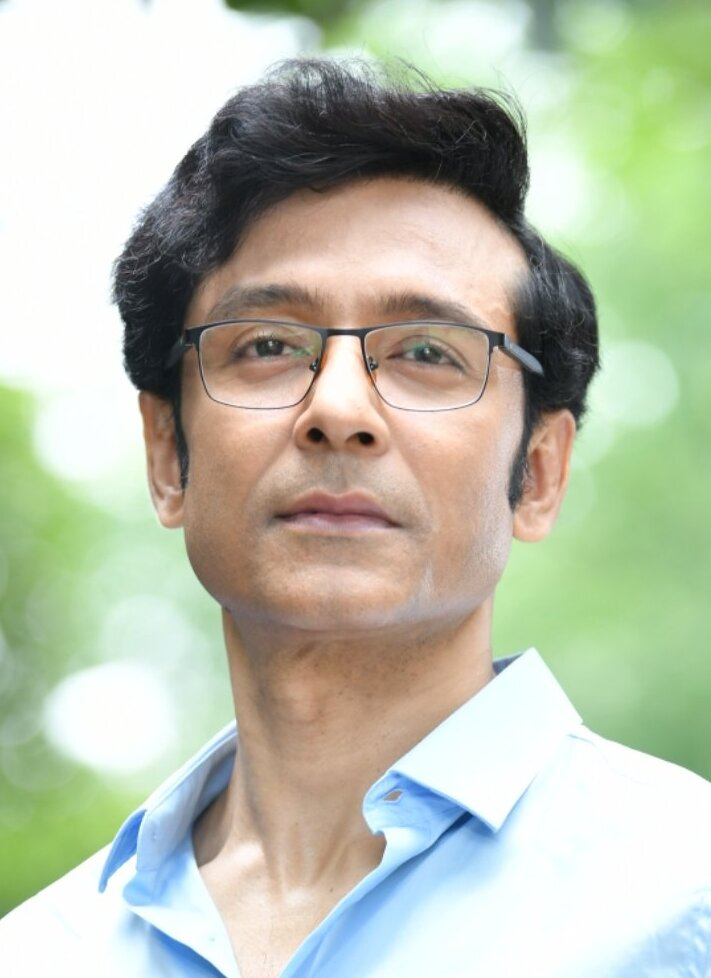
- Tota in 2021
- Born: Pushparag Roy Choudhury; 9 July 1976 (age 50); Kolkata, West Bengal, India
- Occupation: Actor
- Years active: 1993–present

Tota Roy Chowdhury is an Indian actor who predominantly works in Bengali and Hindi cinema. He is also known for his versatile acting performances, fitness, martial arts and dance moves. His notable roles include Feluda in the Hoichoi web series Feludar Goyendagiri based on Satyajit Ray's Feluda series, Chandon Chatterjee in Karan Johar's film Rocky Aur Rani Kii Prem Kahaani and Rohit Sen in Star Jalsha's daily soap Sreemoyee.

He made his big screen debut opposite Miss Jojo in Prabhat Roy's Bengali film Duranta Prem (1993). His breakthrough role came with Rituparno Ghosh's National Award-winning Bengali film Chokher Bali (2003).

== Career ==
=== Early career ===
During his second year in college, he made up his mind to join the Indian Army and was preparing for the CDS exams when fate intervened and he was asked by the director Prabhat Roy to play a small role in his film. That one film brought other offers and soon he decided to become a professional actor. After starring in a few commercially successful films, he was spotted by director Rituparno Ghosh and cast opposite Nandita Das in his film Shubho Mahurat.

=== Breakthrough ===
Chowdhury was cast again opposite Aishwarya Rai in Rituparno's Tagore adaptation, Chokher Bali. He won several awards, including the BFJA Award for the Best Actor.

After Chokher Bali, he did several films both commercial and mainstream like Aborto, Biye Not Out, Choukaath, Benche Thakar Gaan, Bolo Na Tumi Aamar, Paglu 2, Villain, and Shapath which cemented his position in the Bengali film industry.

He did an extended cameo in the AR Murugadoss directed Kaththi which introduced him into Tamil film industry. He also starred in the Sujoy Ghosh directed short film Ahalya alongside Soumitra Chatterjee and Radhika Apte, which went viral and he was noticed for his powerful presence as the police inspector. He then played the role of Arun in the film Kahaani 2: Durga Rani Singh; directed by Sujoy Ghosh opposite Vidya Balan, which got him noticed by the Hindi film industry. His second Hindi film Indu Sarkar directed by Madhur Bhandarkar was released in 2017. He was cast opposite Kirti Kulhari and his portrayal of the troubled government servant Navin fetched him recognition and praises. Industry veteran Anupam Kher tweeted "Tota in Indu Sarkar is a brilliant piece of casting" and Ashutosh Gowariker tweeted "Superb performance by Tota Roy Choudhury".

His next film was Helicopter Eela, directed by Pradeep Sarkar, where he was cast opposite Kajol. His portrayal of the psychologically disturbed Arun fetched him positive reviews. He then starred in a cameo appearance in The Girl on the Train, a Hindi remake of the English film of the same name, which itself was based on the eponymous novel.

He also plays the iconic Bengali detective Feluda created by Satyajit Ray, in the web series, Feludar Goyendagiri, directed by the multiple National Award winner Srijit Mukherji.

In 2023, he starred in Karan Johar's directorial comeback Rocky Aur Rani Kii Prem Kahaani; along with Ranveer Singh and Alia Bhatt. His performance, with regards to acting and Kathak dance, in this film has grabbed a lot of attention and accolades.

== Filmography ==
=== Films ===
Year	Films	Role	Language	Notes
1993	Duranta Prem	Tota Chowdhury	Bengali	
1996	Puja	Chayan Chakraborty	Bengali	
1996	Mukhyamantri	Rajat	Bengali	
1996	Nach Nagini Nach Re		Bengali	
1996	Lathi	Prashanta	Bengali	
1998	Ranokhetro	Noni Roy	Bengali	
1998	Hothat Brishti	Basav	Bengali	
1999	Shudhu Ekbar Bolo		Bengali	
1999	Santan Jakhan Shatru	Dipyendu "Dipu" Ray	Bengali	
1999	Gariber Samman	Sumon	Bengali	
2000	Sasurbari Zindabad	Prashanta	Bengali	
2000	Satbhai		Bengali	
2001	Dada Thakur	Rathin Roy	Bengali	
2003	Shubho Mahurat	Arindam	Bengali	
2003	Chokher Bali	Behari	Bengali	
2004	Ram Laxman	Laxman Sanyal	Bengali	
2005	Shunya E Buke	Artist's Friend	Bengali	
2005	Raat Barota Panch	Tito	Bengali	
2006	Dosar	Kaushik's colleague	Bengali	
2006	Podokkhep	Debjit	Bengali	
2006	Andhakarer Shabdo	Director	Bengali	
2006	Abhinetree		Bengali	
2007	Aloy Phera		Bengali	
2007	Kailashe Kelenkari	Himself	Bengali	Cameo Appearance
2008	90 Ghanta	George	Bengali	
2008	Golmaal	Mainak	Bengali	
2008	Mon Amour: Shesher Kobita Revisited	Jeet	Bengali	
2008	Tintorettor Jishu	Robin / Rajshekhar Niyogi	Bengali	
2009	Paran Jai Jaliya Re	Siddharth aka Sid	Bengali	
2009	Angshumaner Chhobi	Neel	Bengali	
2009	Hitlist		Bengali	
2010	Bolo Na Tumi Aamar	IPS Soumyadeep Sen	Bengali	
2010	Tara	Jahangir Khan	Bengali	
2012	Chaal - The Game Begins	Akbar Ali Khan	Bengali	
2012	Paglu 2	Rudra	Bengali	
2012	Tor Naam	Lecturer of Physics	Bengali	
2013	Villain	Arnab	Bengali	
2013	Aborto	Shyamal Sen	Bengali	
2013	Sunglass	Sanjay	Bengali	Bengali Version
2014	Biye Not Out	Nikhil Sengupta	Bengali	
2014	Ek Phaali Rodh	Pratim	Bengali	
2014	Kaththi	Vivek Banerjee	Tamil	
2015	Shapath: The Promise		Bengali	
2015	Ahalya	Inspector Indra Sen	Bengali	Short Film
2015	Choukath: The Threshold	Ronojoy	Bengali	
2016	Te3n	Peter	Hindi	Cameo
2016	Kahaani 2: Durga Rani Singh	Arun	Hindi	
2016	Benche Thakar Gaan	Dr. Sinha	Bengali	
2017	Indu Sarkar	Naveen Sarkar	Hindi	
2018	Helicopter Eela	Arun Raiturkar	Hindi	
2019	Misha		Bengali	
2019	Jaanbaaz	IPS Officer Abhijit Sarkar	Bengali	
2021	The Girl on the Train	Dr. Hamid (psychiatrist)	Hindi	Netflix Release
2021	Ajeeb Daastaans	Rohan	Hindi	Netflix Release
2021	Mukhosh	Dr. D.S. Paul	Bengali	
2023	Beautiful Life	Painter	Bengali	
2023	Rocky Aur Rani Kii Prem Kahaani	Chandon Chatterjee	Hindi	
2023	Ranchi	SSP Pravin Kumar Singh	Kannada	
2024	Tekka	Rajiv Sanyal	Bengali	
2024	Chaalchitro: The Frame Fatale	Kanishka Chatterjee (Joint Commissioner Crime)	Bengali	
2025	Tere Ishk Mein	Yashwant Beniwal	Hindi	
2026	Keu Bole Biplobi Keu Bole Dakat	Durga Roy IPS	Bengali	
2026	Emperor vs Sarat Chandra	Sarat Chandra Chattopadhyay	Bengali	
2026	Krishnavataram Part 1: The Heart (Hridayam)	Arjuna, third brother of Pandavas	Hindi	Cameo Appearance
2027	Queen Victoria ar Goyenda Kanaicharon	TBA	Bengali	Cameo Appearance

=== Television ===
Year(s)	Title	Role	Channel	Notes	Ref.
2008–2009	Ekhane Aakash Neel	Dr. Romit Sen	Star Jalsha		
2016	Taranath Tantrik	Taranath	Colors Bangla	Based on character by Taradas Bandopadhyay	
2019–2021	Sreemoyee	Rohit Sen	Star Jalsha		

=== Web series ===
Year	Title	Role	Platform	Notes	Ref.
2020-2025	Feluda Pherot	Feluda	Addatimes	Based on Chhinnamastar Abhishap and Joto Kando Kathmandute by Satyajit Ray	
2022-2025	Feludar Goyendagiri	Feluda	Hoichoi	Based on Darjeeling Jomjomat, Bhuswargo Bhayankar and Royal Bengal Rahasya by Satyajit Ray	
2023	Nikhoj	News Anchor Romit Sen	Hoichoi		
2023	Picasso	Palash Choudhury / Picasso	Klikk		
2024	Jaha Bolibo Shotto Bolibo	Lawyer Jayraj Singha	Hoichoi		
2025	Black Warrant	SP Mukhopadhyay	Netflix		
2025	Nikhoj 2	News Anchor Romit Sen	Hoichoi		
2025	Special Ops	Vinod Shekhawat	Disney+ Hotstar		
2026	The Revolutionaries	Abani Sanyal	Amazon Prime Video	Based on the 2023 book "Revolutionaries: The Other Story of How India Won Its Freedom" by economist and writer Sanjeev Sanyal	

== Awards ==
Year	Awards	Category	Title	Result
2004	BFJA Award	Best Actor	Chokher Bali	Won
2008	Anandalok Awards	Best Supporting Actor	Ekhane Akash Neel	Won
2009	Tele Samman	Best Actor	Ekhane Akash Neel	Won
2012	Hyderabad Bengali Film Festival	Best Supporting Actor	Aborto	Won
2017	Pune Short Films Festival	Best Actor in a Negative Role	Ahalya	Won
2021	West Bengal Film Journalists' Association Awards	Best Actor in a Negative Role	Mukhosh	Won
2024	News 18 Showsha Reel Awards	Best Supporting Actor (popular)	Rocky Aur Rani Kii Prem Kahaani	Won
2024	TV9 Bangla Ghorer Bioscope	Best Actor in a Web Series	Jaha Bolibo Shotto Bolibo	Won
2025	Anandalok Awards	Best Actor in a Web Series	Jaha Bolibo Shotto Bolibo	Won
