= Baksho Rahashya (film) =

- DVD cover
- Based on: Baksho-Rahashya by Satyajit Ray
- Written by: Satyajit Ray
- Directed by: Sandip Ray
- Starring: Sabyasachi Chakrabarty; Rabi Ghosh; Saswata Chatterjee; Haradhan Bandopadhyay
- Music by: Satyajit Ray
- Country of origin: India
- Original language: Bengali

Production
- Producer: Chhayabani Pvt. Ltd
- Cinematography: Barun Raha
- Editor: Subrata Roy
- Running time: 98 minutes

Original release
- Release: 1996

Baksho Rahashya (Bengali: বাক্স রহস্য) (transl. The Mystery of the Box) is a 1996 Bengali mystery-thriller film directed by Sandip Ray based on the story of the same name by Satyajit Ray. It was the first telefilm made for Feluda 30, the TV film series, which aired on DD Bangla. Later it was released at Nandan Complex and the DVD and VCD were released in 2001. The film is a sequel to Joy Baba Felunath (1979).

== Plot ==
Feluda, a fictional detective, is approached by an established businessman who claims to have mistakenly swapped his suitcase (baksho) in a train with one belonging to one of his co-passengers and now wants Feluda to put it straight. This simple looking problem lands Feluda, Topshe and Lalmohon Ganguly in Shimla, and into a realm of deceit and mystery involving a long forgotten diamond and a priceless manuscript,A Bengalee in Lamaland. Besides the trio, there is Dinanath Lahiri, the rich kind-hearted businessman, his nephew, Prabeer Lahiri who is a striving actor but too much obsessed with his only weakness, his voice. The other three characters in this story are the ones who were with Dinanath Lahiri in his first class compartment: Mr.Pakrashi who is a manuscript collector, Mr. Brijmohan and Mr. Dhameeja who got his suitcase exchanged with Mr. Lahiri. Feluda's investigations finally put the wrong-doers behind bars.

== Cast ==
- Sabyasachi Chakrabarty as Feluda
- Saswata Chatterjee as Topshe
- Rabi Ghosh as Lalmohan "Jatayu" Ganguly
- Haradhan Bandopadhyay as Dinanath Lahiri
- Ajit Bandopadhyay as Sidhu Jyatha
- Pradip Mukherjee as Prabir Lahiri
- Dibya Bhattacharya as Naresh Chandra Pakrashi
- Rajaram Yagnik as G.C.Dhameeja

== See also ==
- Feluda in film
- Soumitra Chatterjee
