= Bombay (disambiguation) =

Bombay is an alternative and former official name of the city of Mumbai in Maharashtra state of India.

Bombay may also refer to:

== Places ==
- Bombay State, the name of a former state in India, partitioned in 1960 into Gujarat and Maharashtra — previously a province known as Bombay Presidency in British India
- Isle of Bombay, one of the seven islands merged to create the city of Bombay
- The Bombay Hills, New Zealand mark the traditional southern boundary of Auckland
  - Bombay, New Zealand, a village in the Bombay Hills
- Bombay, New York, a town in the United States
- Bombay, Jersey City, New Jersey, an Indian enclave in the United States
- Bombay Beach, California, a settlement in the United States

== Animals ==
- Bombay (cat), a breed of domestic cat

== Film and television ==
- Bombay Circuit, a Hindi film distribution circuit
- Bombay (film), an Indian Tamil film by Mani Ratn
  - Bombay (soundtrack), a soundtrack album from the 1995 film
- Dr. Bombay (character), a character in the television series Bewitched
- Gordon Bombay, head coach and protagonist of the Mighty Ducks film trilogy

== Food and drink ==
- Bombay mix, a traditional Indian snack
- Bombay (mango), a mango cultivar originating in Jamaica
- Bombay Sapphire, a brand of gin

== Transport ==
- Bombay (ship), a list of ships named Bombay
- The Bristol Bombay, a British bomber aircraft named after the Indian city
- HMS Bombay, the name of several Royal Navy ships
- 45576 Bombay, a British LMS Jubilee Class locomotive

== Others ==
- Bombay blood group, an extremely rare blood group
- Bombay High Court, the high court of the Indian state of Maharashtra
- Bombay Company (and Bombay Outlet), a chain of shops selling household goods and furniture
- Bombay Dyeing, a textiles manufacturer from India
- Ghulam Bombaywala, Pakistani-American restaurateur, nicknamed Bombay
- Dr. Bombay, pseudonym of Eurodance artist Jonny Jakobsen

== See also ==
- Bombay Before the British, or "BBB", a Portuguese research project in History of Architecture (2004–2007)
- Bombay duck, a fish named after Bombay
- Bombay Bicycle Club, a band from London
- Bombay Bad boy, a flavour of Pot Noodle
- Bombae, Canadian drag queen
- Bomb bay, the area of a bomber aircraft where the bombs are stored
- Mumbai (disambiguation)
- Bombaiyer Bombete (disambiguation)
