= Mambai =

Mambai may refer to:

- Mambaí, a city in Brazil
- Mambae people, an ethnic group in Timor-Leste
  - Mambae language
- Mambay language, in Cameroon and Chad

== See also ==
- Mumbai (disambiguation)
