= Tintoretto (disambiguation) =

Tintoretto (1518–1594) was an Italian painter identified with the Venetian school.

Tintoretto may also refer to:

- Domenico Tintoretto (1560–1635), his son, also an Italian painter
- Marietta Robusti (c. 1560–1590), sometimes referred to as Tintoretta, his daughter and a Venetian painter
- Tintoretto (crater), a crater on Mercury

== See also ==
- Tintorettor Jishu (disambiguation)
