= Royal Bengal Rahashya (film) =

2011 film by Sandip Ray

- Directed by: Sandip Ray
- Written by: Satyajit Ray
- Based on: Royal Bengal Rahashya by Satyajit Ray
- Starring: Sabyasachi Chakrabarty; Bibhu Bhattacharya; Basudeb Mukherjee
- Music by: Sandip Ray
- Distributed by: Shree Venkatesh Films
- Release date: 23 December 2011
- Country: India
- Language: Bengali
- Budget: Rs.1.90 crore
- Box office: Rs.2.25 crore

Royal Bengal Rahashya (Bengali: রয়েল বেঙ্গল রহস্য), The Royal Bengal Mystery, is a 2011 Indian Bengali thriller film directed by Sandip Ray based on the novel of the same name by Satyajit Ray. The film was released on 23 December 2011. It was the fifth big screen Feluda adaptation of Sandip Ray in the Feluda new film series (Continuity of the original Feluda films of 70's) and was the sequel to Gorosthaney Sabdhan. After the demise of Bibhu Bhattacharya (Jatayu), Sabyasachi Chakrabarty declared that he would not be playing Feluda anymore. Thus, director Sandip Ray decided to reboot the series, Badshahi Angti, the first installment of which starring Abir Chatterjee as Feluda and Sourav Das as Topshe was released on 19 December 2014. But the reboot series was cancelled by Sandip Ray in March, 2016. He revealed instead of continuing the reboot series he will continue the previous Feluda film series and he will make a sequel of this movie named Double Feluda which is heading to a Christmas release in December, 2016. The movie will be a tribute to 50 years of Feluda. For the new film Sabyasachi Chakrabarty will return as Feluda and Saheb Bhattacharya as Topshe after five years.

== Plot ==
On an invitation by Mahitosh Singha Ray, Lalmohon Babu takes Feluda and Topshe to a forest near Bhutan and stays at the ancestral home of Mahitosh Singha Ray. After few days of their arrival, Mahitosh Singha Ray's assistant, Tarit dies. His deadbody is found in the forest, and police believes he has died due to a tiger attack. But later they found a blood-stained sword near his body. Meanwhile, Mahitosh gives Feluda a riddle to solve. He solves it and at the end, chalks out that a treasure chest is hidden 55 hands away from a tree which has a hole between it, which looks like an old person's mouth without any teeth; between two Arjuna trees. While Feluda and his companion are on the way to the treasure chest, they find Tarit's spectacles and later on, his torch, which suggests that Tarit has solved the puzzle much earlier than the others, and was on his way to the treasure chest. At last, Feluda finds the treasure chest, and holds out the conclusion. Mahitosh had broken his hand due to a fall from a tree, which Feluda came to know when he was unable to hold the rifle. All the precious huntings of the tiger were done by his friend, Shashanka. On that night, while Tarit was about to leave, Shashanka too followed him quietly. On seeing a tiger feeding on Tarit's corpse, Shashanka fired his rifle, which injured the tiger's nose after Feluda found a bit of skin. Tarit's sword, as he observed, has begun acting like a magnet, which was started by a bolt of lightning striking it, which kills Tarit in the process. Thus, Tarit wasn't murdered by any villain, but only, nature was the cause of his death. Hence, Feluda is rewarded with a part of the treasure.

== Cast ==
- Sabyasachi Chakrabarty as Feluda
- Saheb Bhattacharya as Topshe
- Bibhu Bhattacharya as Lalmohan 'Jatayu' Ganguly
- Dr. Basudeb Mukherjee as Mahitosh Singha Ray
- Bhaswar Chatterjee as Tarit Sengupta
- Paran Bandyopadhyay as Debotosh Singha Ray
- Debesh Raychowdhury as Shashanka Sanyal
- Biplab Chatterjee as Inspector Dibendyu Biswas
- Sanjib Sarkar as Madhablal

== Production ==
The film version of the book was made by Sandip Ray with the earlier cast of the leading characters. The opening credits include a note that all the animals that appear in the film have been fashioned digitally. The actor of 'Jatayu', Bibhu Bhattacharjee died on the night of 22 September 2011, the day the dubbing was completed. It was released on 23 December 2011. The film is produced by Shree Venkatesh Films and Surinder Films. The film, made on a budget of 1.9 crore grossed about 2.25 crore, became a Superhit.

== Sequel ==
After the cancellation of the Feluda reboot series in March, 2016 Sandip Ray revealed that instead of continuing the reboot series he will continue the previous Feluda film series and he will make a sequel of this movie named Double Feluda which is heading to a Christmas release in December, 2016. The movie will be a tribute to 50 years of Feluda. For the new film Sabyasachi Chakrabarty will return as Feluda and Saheb Bhattacharya as Topshe after five years.
