= Yana Gupta =

Czech model and actress (b. 1979)

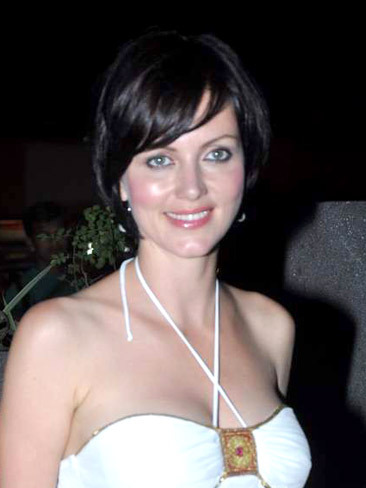
- Yana Gupta in 2016
- Born: Jana Synková; 23 April 1979 (age 47); Brno, South Moravian Region, Czechoslovakia (now Czech Republic)
- Citizenship: Czech Republic
- Occupations: Model, actress
- Spouse: Satyakam Gupta (m. 2001; div. 2005)

Yana Gupta (born Jana Synková; 23 April 1979) is a Czech model and actress who lives and works in India.

== Early life ==
Gupta was born as Jana Synková in 1979 in Brno, South Moravian Region, Czech SR, Czechoslovak SR (now Czech Republic). Her parents divorced and she was brought up with her sister by her single mother.

== Career ==
She started her modelling career at the age of 16, and after graduating in Park Architecture and Gardening, she moved to continue her modelling career in Japan. She later moved to India, spending her first years at ashram of Osho in Pune, where she married artist Satyakam Gupta, changing her last name to Gupta.

In 2001, she entered the Indian modelling industry and became the brand ambassador of the largest Indian cosmetic brand, Lakme. In 2002, she made her first appearance in Bollywood with the song "Babuji Zara Dheere Chalo" in the film Dum. She also appeared in an item song in Venkatesh's Gharshana.

In 2009, Gupta released a book on health, How To Love Your Body And Get The Body You Love. She also released a music album. In 2011, she again appeared in an item song for the movie Murder 2.

She performed in the Bigg Boss 6 finale. She reached the finale of Jhalak Dikhhla Jaa but lost to Meiyang Chang. After participating in various TV shows, she appeared again in the film Dassehra (2018) in the item song "Joganiya".

== Personal life ==
She was married to Satyakam Gupta, an artist, in 2001 but they divorced in 2005.

== Filmography ==
Films

Year	Film	Role	Language	Notes
2003	Dum	Dancer	Hindi	In the song "Babuji Zara Dheere Chalo"
2004	Manmadhan	Special appearance	Tamil	In the song "Thathai Thathai"
2004	Gharshana	Special appearance	Telugu	In the song "Aadataramaa"
2004	Rakht	Dancer	Hindi	In the song "Oh! What a Babe!"
2005	Jogi	Dancer	Kannada	In the song "Bin Ladin Nan Maava!"
2005	Anniyan	Special appearance	Tamil	In the song "Kadhal Yaanai"
2007	Shankardada Zindabad	Item number	Telugu	In the song "Aakalesthe Annam Pedtha"
2007	Manorama Six Feet Under		Hindi	Friendly appearance
2007	Kaisay Kahein...	Singer / Dancer – Australia	Hindi	
2008	90 Ghanta		Bengali	
2011	Chalo Dilli	Item number	Hindi	
2011	Murder 2	Jyoti	Hindi	In the song "Aa Zara"
2011	Stand By	Item number	Hindi	
2018	Dassehra	Item number	Hindi	In the song "Joganiya"

Television appearances

Television	Appearances	Notes
Show Jana Krause		Czech show, episode dated 28 September 2012
Fear Factor: Khatron Ke Khiladi 1	Contestant	
Jhalak Dikhhla Jaa	Contestant	Season 4
Life Mein Ek Baar (2013)	Contestant	

== Music videos ==
Year	Title	Performer(s)	Role	Album	Ref.
2007	Kisi Din	Adnan Sami	Unnamed	Kisi Din	
