= Diocese of Mumbai =

Diocese of Mumbai may refer to:

- Mumbai Orthodox Diocese
- Roman Catholic Archdiocese of Bombay
- Diocese of Mumbai (Church of North India)
