= Bombaiyer Bombete =

Bombaiyer Bombete may refer to:

- Bombaiyer Bombete, a 1976 novel by Satyajit Ray
- Bombaiyer Bombete (film), a 2003 film directed by Sandip Ray, based on the novel

== See also ==
- Bombay (disambiguation)
