= Tintorettor Jishu =

Tintorettor Jishu (lit. 'Tintoretto's Jesus') may refer to:

- Tintorettor Jishu (novel), a 1982 novel by Satyajit Ray
- Tintorettor Jishu (film), a 2008 film directed by Sandip Ray, based on the novel

== See also ==
- Tintoretto (disambiguation)
