= Subhadra Sen Gupta =

Indian writer (1952–2021)

- Born: June 1952; Delhi, India
- Died: 3 May 2021 (aged 68)
- Education: Delhi University
- Writing career
- Language: English
- Period: 1980s–2021
- Genres: historical fiction, non-fiction, travel, mystery, horror
- Notable work: Mystery of the House of Pigeons

Subhadra Sen Gupta (June 1952 – May 2021) was an Indian writer known for her works in children’s historical fiction and literature. She was the winner of Sahitya Akademi's 2015 Bal Sahitya Puraskar and wrote over 40 books for children with a wide range of genres. Her book, Mystery of the House of Pigeons, was adapted into a television series for Doordarshan as Khoj Khazana Khojh .She is also famous for writing the books “The Teenage Diary Of Jodh Bai”, “The Constitution Of India For Children” and “A Children’s History Of India”.. Most of her books are in the genres of historical fiction and non-fiction, but she also wrote travelogues, comic strips and detective and ghost stories.

== Life and career ==
Sen Gupta was born in Delhi. She held a master's degree in history. She began writing in college, working as a copywriter for advertising agencies.

Some of her works include Goodbye, Pasha Begum! from The Puffin Book of Spooky Ghost Stories (a horror story where a girl holidaying in Delhi finds herself as a slave in the Mughal era), Bishnu - The Dhobi Singer (a dhobi boy who is taken under the tutelage of Tansen) and A Mauryan Adventure (the daughter of a soldier in Ashoka's army finds herself travelling the world). The Secret Diary of the World's Worst Cook (the child of two physicists who is bad at physics himself finds a diary written by a boy in a similar situation coming from a family of cooks) is part of a book series, World's Worst, written in the diary format. This series also includes The Secret Diary of the World's Worst Cook. A Flag, A Song And a Pinch of Salt features 19 freedom fighters of India and their inspiring stories.

She also wrote a book for TERI, Caring for Nature: Bapu and the Missing Blue Pencil. Her 2015 book, A Children's History of India, was about the history of India written for children over the age of 10 years. In 2020, she released The Constitution of India for Children (sourced from books written by Ramachandra Guha, Bipan Chandra, Granville Austin and Derek O'Brien) and Mahal: Power and Pageantry in the Mughal Harem (about the social life of a harem in the Mughal era). She is also famous for her books A Bagful of History, The Teenage Diary of Jodh Bai and The Teenage Diary of Jahanara

Sen Gupta died of COVID-19 on 3 May 2021, at the age of 68, amid the COVID-19 pandemic in India.

== Awards and accolades ==
Her book, Mystery of the House of Pigeons, was adapted into a six-part television series by Feisal Alkazi as Khoj Khazana Khojher on Doordarshan. Her works were also chosen as part of NCERT textbooks. Three of her books, Twelve O'Clock Ghost Stories, The Teenage Diary of Jodh Bai and A Clown for Tenali Rama were included in the annual White Ravens catalogue at the Bologna Children's Book Fair. In 2015, she was awarded the Bal Sahitya Puraskar by the Sahitya Akademi for her contribution to children's literature in the English language.

== Works ==
=== Stories ===
- Goodbye, Pasha Begum! (in The Book of Spooky Ghost Stories)
- Bishnu - The Dhobi Singer
- A Mauryan Adventure
- Painting The Breeze

=== Novels ===
- Danger in Darjeeling: Satyajit Ray's Feluda Mysteries (2010)
- A Flag, A Song And a Pinch of Salt
- Marching to Freedom
- The Secret Diary of the World's Worst Cook
- The Secret Diary of the World's Worst Friend
- Caring for Nature: Bapu and the Missing Blue Pencil
- A Children's History of India (2015)
- The Constitution of India for Children (2020)
- Mahal: Power and Pageantry in the Mughal Harem (2020)
