= Gorosthaney Sabdhan (film) =

2010 Indian Bengali film

- Gorosthaney Sabdhan poster
- Directed by: Sandip Ray
- Screenplay by: Sandip Ray
- Story by: Satyajit Ray
- Produced by: Mou Roychoudhury
- Starring: Sabyasachi Chakrabarty; Bibhu Bhattacharya; Saheb Bhattacharya
- Music by: Sandip Ray
- Distributed by: V3G Films Private Limited,
- Release date: 10 December 2010
- Country: India
- Language: Bengali

Gorosthaney Sabdhan is a 2010 Bengali thriller film directed by Sandip Ray based on the novel of the same name by Satyajit Ray. The film was released on 10 December 2010. It is different from most other Feluda stories, in the sense that this story is based on Feluda's hometown Kolkata (Calcutta). Most of Feluda's adventures take place as he and his company go to visit some place in India or outside. Here, however, Calcutta itself is the setting. It is the fourth film of the New Feluda franchise as well as the sequel of Tintorettor Jishu.

== Plot ==
By accident, more than anything else, the three find themselves beside the grave of Thomas Godwin. The grave was dug up by some miscreants for unknown reasons. The rather colorful history of Mr. Godwin makes Feluda curious to know more about the man. From the diary of Thomas' daughter Charlotte, Feluda finds that a very precious Repeater wristwatch went to Thomas' grave with him. To his surprise, Feluda finds that another party knows about this wristwatch and they are trying to get it aided by the letter with them. Thanks to the brilliance of the detective and the help of 'Haripodobabu', the chauffeur of Mr. Ganguli, a new introduction in this book, their plot is foiled.

The Old Calcutta: for a long time, Calcutta was the capital of British India. Just as the story of the Nawabs plays a vital part in 'Badshahi Angti' (based on Lucknow), the story of British families who lived in the former capital of the British Raj, plays a prominent part in this story. Feluda goes to a Christian cemetery, to see the graves of the members of the Godwin family. He goes to Ripon Lane to meet a living member of the family. Later on, he finds that there is an Anglo-Indian branch of the family as well.

== Cast ==
- Sabyasachi Chakrabarty as Feluda
- Saheb Bhattacharya as Topshe
- Bibhu Bhattacharya as Jatayu
- Dwijen Bandopadhyay as Priyabrata Sikdar
- Dhritiman Chatterjee as Mahadeb Chowdhury
- Subhashish Mukherjee as William Girindranath Biswas
- Haradhan Bandopadhyay As Sidhu Jetha
- Tinnu Anand as Marcus Godwin
- Pradip Mukherjee as Michael Narendranath Biswas
- Tamal Ray Chowdhury as Mr. Arakis
