= Goopy–Bagha =

Indian Bengali fantasy adventure comedy film series

- Created by: Upendrakishore Ray Chowdhury
- Original work: Goopy Gyne Bagha Byne (early 1910s)

Print publications
- Short stories: Goopy Gyne Bagha Byne (early 1910s)

Films and television
- Film(s): Live-action: Goopy Gyne Bagha Byne (1969); by Satyajit Ray: Hirak Rajar Deshe (1980); by Satyajit Ray: Goopy Bagha Phire Elo (1992); by Satyajit and Sandip Ray Animated: Gupi Gawaiya Bagha Bajaiya (2014)

Audio
- Soundtrack(s): Goopy Gyne Bagha Byne (1969); Hirak Rajar Deshe (1980); Goopy Bagha Phire Elo (1992); Goopy Gawaiya Bagha Bajaiya (2014)

Goopy–Bagha is a series of Indian Bengali fantasy adventure comedy films. The series is based on a story by Satyajit Ray's grandfather Upendrakishore Ray Chowdhury. The first two films Goopy Gyne Bagha Byne (1969) and its sequel Hirak Rajar Deshe (1980) were directed by Satyajit Ray, and the third, Gupi Bagha Phire Elo (1992), was directed by his son Sandip Ray. The trilogy starred Tapen Chatterjee and Rabi Ghosh as Goopy and Bagha, respectively. The 2013 Hindi-language animated film Goopi Gawaiya Bagha Bajaiya was based on the story Goopy Gyne Bagha Byne. The film is directed by Shilpa Ranade.

== Satyajit Ray series ==
=== Goopy Gyne Bagha Byne (1969) ===
The story revolves around Gopinath Gayin (alias Gupi, played by Tapen Chatterjee), the son of a poor grocer Kanu Kyne from a village called Amloki. Goopy wants to become a singer but has a hoarse voice. Persuaded by village elders to sing for the king, he does so and is driven out of Amloki on a donkey for waking the king with his terrible singing. Exiled into a forest, he meets Bagha (Rabi Ghosh), another exile from nearby Hortuki sent to the forest – in Bagha's case, due to playing the drum badly. They start singing and drumming, initially to scare off a roaming tiger, and in the process, they attract a group of ghosts who are fascinated by their music. The king of ghosts grants them three boons:

- They can get food and clothes whenever needed by clapping their hands.
- They are given a pair of magic slippers with which they can travel anywhere.
- They gain the ability to hold people in awe (literally, their music renders people motionless) with their music.

They travel to Shundi, where a benevolent king appoints them court musicians. However, the king of Halla (the long lost brother of the king of Shundi) is planning to attack Shundi, after being poisoned with magic potion that makes him evil, given to the king of Halla by his self-centered prime minister. Goopy and Bagha travel to Halla in an attempt at preventing the attack, but are captured instead. Since they have now lost their slippers, they can't escape by magic, but manage to do so instead by strategy. They arrive singing and drumming when the soldiers are about to launch their attack, capturing the king of Halla, who is returned to Shundi. The two brothers are reunited and Goopy and Bagha marry the daughters of the two kings.

=== Hirak Rajar Deshe (1980) ===
The magically musical duo of Goopy Gyne and Bagha Byne make a comeback in this sequel, where they are invited to the court of the Hirak Raja (The Diamond King), for their musical skills. They are to perform at the kingdom's Jubilee Celebrations.

Goopy and Bagha are bored with their lives as crown princes of Shundi and Halla. They are looking for a change, which comes in the form of a chance to visit Hirak Rajya (Land of Diamonds), known for its huge diamond mines. They jocundly set out for Hirak Rajya. They are unaware of the machinations of Aishik Rehman (Utpal Dutt). The king is a tyrant. Diamonds and riches get pent up in his treasuries, while his subjects suffer. Those who protest are taken care of in the 'Jantarmantar', a chamber for brainwashing devised by the scientist (Santosh Dutta), who the king mocks calling as "Gobeshok Gobochondro Gyanotirtho Gyanorotno Gyanambudhi Gyanochuramoni". His ministers are mere puppets. The only enemy the king has in his land is Udayan Pandit (Soumitra Chatterjee). He is a school teacher and, more than that, he is a believer of values. The king forcefully closes his school down. Udayan flees to hide in the mountains.

Meanwhile, Goopy and Bagha are on their way to Hirok Rajya. By coincidence, they meet Udayan, who intimates them of the king's true nature. The two impress Udayan with their magical powers, who plans to use them against the tyrant. Goopy and Bagha agree. The duo then head into Hirok Rajya, where they are welcomed with grandeur. They entertain the rogue king, fooling him into believing that they think he is great. They rob the treasury (which was guarded by a tiger) using their magical music, for bribing the guards.

The king has his tricks, too. He captures Udayan and all his students, and takes them to the Jantarmantar for brainwashing. But Goopy Bagha have already reached there using their magical powers. They have also bribed the Gobeshok onto their side, with the guards. On reaching the laboratory, the king and his ministers are stunned magically by Goopy's singing and then pushed into the Brainwashing machine. After the king is brainwashed he turns to goode, he then along with the villagers pull down his own statue situated at the center of the village, and everything goes back to normal in the land of Hirak Raja.

=== Goopy Bagha Phire Elo (1992) ===
Goopy Gyne and Bagha Byne have ruled the kingdom of Shundi and are bored of royal luxuries. They want to get back to the days of adventure they had enjoyed all their lives, but age comes in the way. They leave the kingdom in search of new experiences. Finally, they reach Anandagarh and win the king's heart with their musical abilities and powers. In the court room they meet Brahmananda Acharya, who invites Goopy and Bagha to come to Anandagarh fort. When they go to his place he offers them a job to steal three valuable stones, making use of their miraculous powers gifted by Bhuter Raja (King of Ghosts). In return he promises to make them 20 years younger. They steal two rare stones with a hope to become young again.

However, in their dream the King of Ghost appears and advises them to keep off injustice. They apologise to him and return the stones to the respective owners. Brahmananda Acharya had gained immense powers, as shown when he was not rendered motionless when they sang in front of the court. But for his greed for rare and valuable stones, he was not offered immortality. It was foretold of the 12-year boy, Bikram, with divine powers, would defeat him. To prevent his death, Brahmananda Acharya had all the boys in Anandagarh, who were 12 years old and were named Bikram, kidnapped by his soldiers. He hypnotized them, making them his servants. In the end, Goopy and Bagha find out that one boy named Kanu was previously named Bikram. He was to receive divine powers at the age of 12. He, along with Goopy and Bagha, goes towards Anandagarh fort. There, as Bikram entered the fort and came close to Brahmananda Acharya, the Acharya sank beneath the ground, signifying that he had been destroyed. His valuable stones also vanished.

=== Future ===
Sandip Ray wanted to make another sequel to this series. He had received many requests to make the fourth Goopy–Bagha movie. Ray said to The Times of India about the plot of fourth film: "Making a Goopy Bagha movie without Tapen and Rabi is unthinkable. The only way I can do a fourth is by taking the story forward and introducing Goopy and Bagha's sons". The idea to weave a story around the next generation came from a line from the introductory song 'Mora dujonai rajar jamai in 'Hirak Rajar Deshe' — "aar ache polapan, ek khan ek khan... (we have one child each)".

== Animated adaptations ==
Goopi Gawaiya Bagha Bajaiya is an Indian animated film made in Hindi, based on these two characters Goopy and Bagha. The film is directed by Shilpa Ranade.

The film won and was nominated for several awards:

- ASIFA (India) for Best Professional Animated Feature Film (Won)
- 18th ICFF (Hyderabad) for Best Artwork (Won)
- The WIFTS Award (Los Angeles) (Won)
- APSA (Brisbane Australia) for Best Animated Feature (Nominated)

== Cast and characters ==
Character	Live-action Films			Animated Film
Character	Goopy Gyne Bagha Byne (1969)	Hirak Rajar Deshe (1980)	Goopy Bagha Phire Elo (1992)	Goopi Gawaiya Bagha Bajaiya (2014)
Goopy Gyne	Tapen Chatterjee	Tapen Chatterjee	Tapen Chatterjee	Animated; Rajeev Raj (voice)
Bagha Byne	Rabi Ghosh	Rabi Ghosh	Rabi Ghosh	Animated; Manish Bhawan (voice)
King of Shundi	Santosh Dutta	Santosh Dutta	Mentioned only	Animated
King of Halla	Santosh Dutta	Mentioned only		Animated
Borfi (The Magician)	Harindranath Chattopadhyay			Animated
Prime Minister of Halla	Jahor Roy			Animated
King of Ghosts	Prasad Mukherjee; Satyajit Ray (voice)	Mentioned only	Prasad Mukherjee; Satyajit Ray (voice)	Animated; Shailendra Pandey (voice)
Hirak Raja		Utpal Dutt	Mentioned only	
Udayan Pandit		Soumitra Chatterjee		
Gobeshok Gobochondro Gyanotirtho Gyanorotno Gyanambudhi Gyanochuramoni		Santosh Dutta		
Fazl Mia		Sunil Sarkar		
Balaram		Nani Ganguli		
Bidusak		Ajoy Banerjee		
King of Anandagarh			Haradhan Bandopadhyay	
Brahmananda Acharya			Ajit Bandyopadhyay	

== Accolades ==
=== National ===
Award	Film		
Award	Goopy Gyne Bagha Byne	Hirak Rajar Deshe	Goopy Bagha Phire Elo
Best Feature Film	Won	Won (In Bengali)	
Best Direction	Won (Satyajit Ray)		
Best Music Direction		Won (Satyajit Ray)	
Best Male Playback Singer		Won (Anup Ghoshal)	

=== Other ===
Film	Occasion	Award	Awardee	Result
Goopy Gyne Bagha Byne	Adelaide Film Festival	Silver Cross	Goopy Gyne Bagha Byne	Won
Goopy Gyne Bagha Byne	Tokyo	Merit Award	Satyajit Ray	Won
Goopy Gyne Bagha Byne	Auckland Film Festival	Best Director	Satyajit Ray	Won
Goopy Gyne Bagha Byne	Melbourne International Film Festival	Best Film	Goopy Gyne Bagha Byne	Won
Goopy Gyne Bagha Byne	19th Berlin International Film Festival	Golden Bear	Goopy Gyne Bagha Byne	Nominated
Hirak Rajar Deshe	Cyprus International Film Festival	Special Award	Satyajit Ray	Won
Goopy Bagha Phire Elo	BFJA Awards	Best Indian Films	Goopy Bagha Phire Elo	Won
Goopy Bagha Phire Elo	BFJA Awards	Best Editing	Dulal Dutta	Won
Goopy Bagha Phire Elo	BFJA Awards	Best Art Direction	Ashok Bose	Won
Goopy Bagha Phire Elo	BFJA Awards	Best Choreography	Barun Raha	Won
Goopy Bagha Phire Elo	BFJA Awards	Best Lyrics	Satyajit Ray	Won
Goopy Bagha Phire Elo	BFJA Awards	Best Music	Satyajit Ray	Won
Goopy Bagha Phire Elo	BFJA Awards	Best Playback Singer (Male)	Anup Ghoshal	Won
Goopy Bagha Phire Elo	BFJA Awards	Most Outstanding Work of the Year	Tapen Chatterjee	Won
Goopi Gawaiya Bagha Bajaiya	International Animated Film Association (India)	Best Professional Animated Feature Film	Goopi Gawaiya Bagha Bajaiya	Won
Goopi Gawaiya Bagha Bajaiya	18th ICFF (Hyderabad)	Best Artwork	Goopi Gawaiya Bagha Bajaiya	Won
Goopi Gawaiya Bagha Bajaiya	The WIFTS Award (Los Angeles)		Goopi Gawaiya Bagha Bajaiya	Won
Goopi Gawaiya Bagha Bajaiya	Asia Pacific Screen Awards (Brisbane Australia)	Best Animated Feature Film	Goopi Gawaiya Bagha Bajaiya	Nominated
