= Goopy Gyne Bagha Byne =

1969 film by Satyajit Ray

- Theatrical release poster
- Directed by: Satyajit Ray
- Written by: Satyajit Ray
- Based on: Goopy Gyne Bagha Byne by Upendrakishore Ray Chowdhury
- Produced by: Nepal Dutta; Asim Dutta
- Starring: Tapen Chatterjee; Rabi Ghosh; Santosh Dutta; Harindranath Chattopadhyay; Jahor Roy; Santi Chatterjee; Chinmoy Roy
- Cinematography: Soumendu Roy
- Edited by: Dulal Dutta
- Music by: Satyajit Ray
- Production company: Purnima Pictures
- Release date: 8 May 1969
- Running time: 120 minutes
- Country: India
- Language: Bengali

Goopy Gyne Bagha Byne (Bangla pronunciation) is a 1969 Bengali satirical superhero film written and directed by Satyajit Ray and based on a story by his grandfather Upendrakishore Ray Chowdhury. It is a fantasy musical, with music and lyrics composed and written by Ray himself. This is the first film of the Goopy–Bagha series, and there are two sequels – Hirak Rajar Deshe, which was released in 1980, and Goopy Bagha Phire Elo, written by Satyajit Ray but directed by his son Sandip Ray, which was released in 1992.

The film was based on the characters Goopy Gyne and Bagha Byne, who made their first appearance in the Sandesh magazine in 1915, with illustrations by Ray's grandfather Upendrakishore Ray Chowdhury. In 1961, after the revival of Sandesh, Ray began contemplating the idea of making a film based on that story, and he was partly compelled by his son Sandip to make a film which was less 'grim and adult'. This was matched by Ray's own desire to make a movie that, unlike his previous films, would cater to children. Plus, this would also give him an opportunity to lace the story with music and dancing, a point his movies' producers and distributors were always insisting upon. Ray managed to convince producers to finance the film, even though it was clear from the beginning that the film would cost a lot of money.

The movie was released to great critical and commercial reception, holding the record for the longest continuous run of a Bengali-language movie in Bengal, by running for 51 straight weeks. It won the Best Feature Film and Best Direction awards at the 16th National Film Awards, and went on to win many other international awards as well. Critical reception was highly positive. Raja Sen called it the most innovative film to have ever come out of India. Phil Hall said that the film "comes as a delightful surprise – Ray, it appears, not only possessed a great sense of humor but also enjoyed a stunning talent for musical cinema".

The king of ghosts grants Goopy and Bagha three boons
A clipping from the film Goopy Gyne Bagha Byne where the king of ghosts ("bhuter raja") grants Goopy and Bagha three boons. Significantly Satyajit Ray used his own voice for the voice of the king of ghosts ("bhuter raja"). In these scenes, the king of ghosts is speaking in rhyme. In 1980, Ray made a sequel to Goopy Gyne Bagha Byne, Hirak Rajar Deshe, in this film too, most of the dialogues exchanged by the protagonists of the film were rhyming. Satyajit Ray praised S. V. Rao for the ghost dance effect by calling it a technical feat.

== Plot ==
Gopinath Gyne alias Goopy is the son of a poor grocer Kanu Kyne from a village called Amloki. Goopy wants to become a singer, but he sings terribly without melody, rhythm or tune. In an attempt to mock him, the village elders persuade Goopy to sing for the king in the early morning hours right under His Majesty's bedroom window. Goopy does so, but his terrible singing only disturbs the king's sleep, who then summons him to his court. There, the king humiliates him and orders for him to be driven out of Amloki on a donkey.

Exiled to a forest, he meets Bagha Byne, another exile from nearby village called Hortuki. Like Goopy, Bagha had been exiled from his village for playing the drum badly. They encounter a tiger in the forest, from which they narrowly escape by staying perfectly still. After the tiger is gone, they start to celebrate by singing and drumming. This attracts a group of ghosts, who are fascinated by their music. Happy with their performance, the king of the ghosts (Bhooter Raja) grants them three boons. These boons will only work if they are together.

- They can get any food or clothing they want by clapping their hands with each other.
- They are given a pair of magic slippers, which, when worn, will allow them to travel anywhere. All they need to do is clap their hands with each other and say the name of the place they want to go to.
- They become flawless musicians and gain the ability to hold people in awe with their music (literally, their music renders people motionless).

The pair travel to Shundi, where a benevolent king appoints them court musicians. However, the king of Halla (the long lost twin brother of Shundi's king), is planning to attack Shundi, after being poisoned by his prime minister with the help of a magic potion that makes him evil. He is aided by a senile sorcerer, who has created the evil potion.

Goopy and Bagha travel to Halla in an attempt to prevent the attack, but are captured instead. They also lose the power of their slippers when captured and hence cannot escape the jail by magic, but manage to do so by luring the famished gatekeeper with delicious foods. They arrive singing and drumming when the soldiers are about to launch their attack, rendering the army motionless. Next, they wish for unlimited food and sweets, which rain from the sky on the starving soldiers who forget the battle and settle for filling their bellies. Not only this, their singing takes off the evil effects of the potion given to the King of Halla, who drops the idea of capturing Shundi, and reunites happily with his brother. For averting the war, the two kings of Shundi and Halla respectively marry their daughters to Goopy and Bagha.

== Cast ==
- Tapen Chatterjee - Goopy Gyne
- Rabi Ghosh - Bagha Byne
- Santosh Dutta - King of Shundi and King of Halla
- Harindranath Chattopadhyay - Borfi (The Magician)
- Ajoy Banerjee - Visitor to Halla
- Ratan Banerjee - Court singer at Shundi
- Durgadas Bannerjee - King of Amloki
- Binoy Bose - Village elder / visitor to Halla
- Govinda Chakravarti - Goopy's father
- Abani Chatterjee - Village elder
- Kartik Chatterjee - Court singer at Shundi / visitor to Halla
- Santi Chatterjee - Commander of Halla army
- Gopal Dey - Executioner
- Shailen Ganguli - Visitor to Halla
- Jahor Roy - Prime Minister of Halla
- Tarun Mitra - Court singer at Shundi
- Haridhan Mukherjee - Village elder
- Prasad Mukherjee - King of ghosts / village elder (bhoot er raja)
- Khagen Pathak - Village elder
- Chinmoy Roy - Spy of Halla
- Joykrishna Sanyal - Court singer at Shundi
- Mani Srimani - Visitor to Halla

== Production ==
=== Origins ===
Around 1967, Ray started toying with the idea of creating a film based on extra terrestrial creatures on Earth, and wrote a screenplay to that effect. Marlon Brando and Peter Sellers were supposed to star in lead roles in the film. However, things did not turn out well between him and Columbia Pictures, and the project was shelved. Unable to make a fantasy movie in Hollywood, Ray decided to make one in India instead. He intended to reach a wider audience with this film, prompted in part by the lukewarm box office performance of his previous movies Kapurush, Mahapurush and Nayak. R.D Bansal, who had produced those movies, became even less enthusiastic when he learnt of the film's estimated budget, and, as Ray told Marie Seton in December 1967, he spent the remainder of that year scouting for finance, and almost reduced to the same situation as he had been during shooting Pather Panchali. Finally, towards the end of 1967, Nepal Dutta and Asim Dutta of Purnima Pictures agreed to lend some financial help. But since it was not substantial enough to shoot the entire movie in color, Ray decided to do it in black and white and show only the final scene in color.

=== Development and filming ===
The film's pivotal sequence was a six and a half-minute dance, divided into four numbers, performed by the ghosts of the forest in front of Goopy and Bagha. The numbers were intertwined into a phantasmagoria of contrasting styles and moods. Ray settled on four classes of ghosts keeping in line with the four common classes in the social hierarchy in Hinduism, "since we have so many class divisions, the ghosts should have the same". Thus came to be included the king and warriors, sahibs, fat people and the common people. Ray decided that the music ought to have "some order, form and precision", instead of being just being "a wooly, formless kind of thing". He remembered a South Indian classical form he had once heard in the Delhi Film Festival, which used 12 musical instruments, of which he selected four. He deliberately avoided melody, because "melody suggests a kind of sophistication". Each class, except the sahibs, was played by actors appropriately dressed and made-up, the sahibs were shadow-puppets expertly under-cranked to create the illusion. The dance culminates with the four classes positioned vertically, with the priests at the bottom and the common people at the top, in contrast with the traditional class hierarchy. Ray imagined the caste system upside down in reaction to the evolving nature of power.

== Soundtrack and other songs ==
Track listing
No.	Title	Music	Singer(s)	Length
1.	"ভূতের রাজার বর দেওয়া (Bhuter Rajar Bor deoa)"	Satyajit Ray	Satyajit Ray, Tapen Chatterjee and Rabi Ghosh	1:37
2.	"দেখোরে নয়ন মেলে (Dekhore Nayan Mele)"	Satyajit Ray	Anup Ghoshal	1:55
3.	"ভূতের রাজা দিলো বর (Bhuter Raja Dilo Bor)"	Satyajit Ray	Anup Ghoshal and Rabi Ghosh	2:22
4.	"মহারাজা! তোমারে সালাম (Maharaja! Tomare Selam)"	Satyajit Ray	Anup Ghoshal	3:37
5.	"রাজা শোনো (Raja Shono)"	Satyajit Ray	Anup Ghoshal	1:50
6.	"ওরে বাঘারে (Ore Baghare)"	Satyajit Ray	Anup Ghoshal and Rabi Ghosh	2:02
7.	"ও মন্ত্রী মশাই (O Mantri Moshai)"	Satyajit Ray	Anup Ghoshal	1:37
8.	"হল্লা চলেছে যুদ্ধে (Halla Choleche Juddhe)"	Satyajit Ray	Kamu Mukherjee and Jahor Roy	1:42
9.	"এক যে ছিল রাজা... (Ek Je Chhilo Raja...)"	Satyajit Ray	Anup Ghoshal	2:45
10.	"ওরে বাবা দেখো চেয়ে (Ore Baba Dekho Cheye)"	Satyajit Ray	Anup Ghoshal	3:43

== Critical reception ==
Critical response was generally positive, with the length and special effects being the main points of criticism. Dennis Schwartz wrote that "its only fault is that I thought it was too lengthy to hold the attention of children. But the appealing film dazzles with Ray's lively score that's carried out very well by the film's stars". Lindsay Anderson said that it had got lovely things in it, but it went on for too long. A critic, writing for The Guardian, said that this was "Satyajit Ray at his least convincing". The Observer wrote that "perhaps it would appeal to singularly unfidgety children". The Times observed, "Ray is a true poet of the cinema, but he finds his poetry in everyday reality; in all-out fantasy, he seems somewhat prosaic". It was, however, a smash hit at home. Ray later wrote to Marie Seton that "it is extraordinary how quickly it has become part of popular culture. Really there isn't a single child who doesn't know and sing the songs".

== Awards and honors ==
At the 16th National Film Awards, the movie won two major awards:

- Best Feature Film
- Best Direction

It won 4 international awards:

- The Silver Cross at Adelaide
- Best director at Auckland Film Festival
- Best film at Melbourne International Film Festival
- Merit Award in Tokyo

It was also nominated for the Golden Bear at the Berlin Film Festival.

== Preservation ==
The Academy Film Archive preserved Goopy Gyne Bagha Byne in 2003.

== Remake ==
Goopy Gyne Bagha Byne was remade into a Hindi language animated film named Goopi Gawaiya Bagha Bajaiya, directed by Shilpa Ranade. It was nominated for and won for several international awards.

== Sequels ==
=== Hirak Rajar Deshe ===
Satyajit Ray made a sequel named Hirak Rajar Deshe, which released eleven years after the release of Goopy Gyne Bagha Byne.

=== Goopy Bagha Phire Elo ===
Sandip Ray, son of director Satyajit Ray directed another sequel named Goopy Bagha Phire Elo. The film released twelve years after the release of Hirak Rajar Deshe.

=== Future ===
Sandip Ray wants to make another sequel to this series. He had received many requests to make the fourth Goopy - Bagha movie. Ray said to The Times of India about the plot of the fourth film: "Making a Goopy Bagha movie without Tapen and Rabi is unthinkable. The only way I can do a fourth is by taking the story forward and introducing Goopy and Bagha's sons". The idea to weave a story around the next generation came from a line from the introductory song 'Mora Dujonai Rajar Jamai' in 'Hirak Rajar Deshe'—"aar ache polapan, ek khan ek khan... (we have one child each)".

== Legacy ==
Maharaja Tomare Selam is an upcoming Bengali film, which derives the title of a song in Goopy Gyne Bagha Byne, centers on Ray himself, the pressures he faced and the choices he made against the backdrop of a politically charged Kolkata, as he willed “Goopy Gyne Bagha Byne” into existence. Principal photography will commence in January 2027. It will be directed by Srijit Mukherji.

== See also ==
- Gayen
- Pather Panchali
