= Ghosts in Bengali culture =

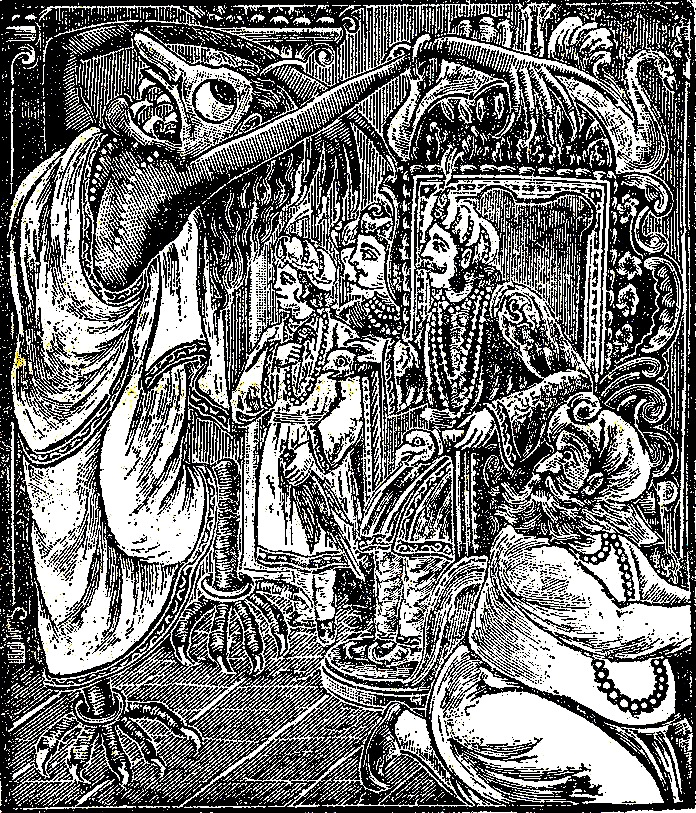
The depiction of a Rakkhoshi queen at the king's palace, an illustration from the classic Bengali folk-lore collection Thakurmar Jhuli (1907) by Dakshinaranjan Mitra Majumder

Ghosts are an integral part of the folklore of Bengal, which presently consists of Bangladesh and the Indian states of West Bengal and Tripura. Bengali folktales and cultural identity are intertwined in such a way that ghosts depicted reflect the culture it sets in. Fairy tales, both old and new, often use the concept of ghosts.

The common Bengali word for ghosts is bhoot (Bengali: ভূত, romanized: bhūt), which comes from Sanskrit bhūta (भूत), meaning "past" or "something that has passed". Also, the word pret (Bengali: প্রেত, romanized: prēt, derived from Sanskrit prēta) is used in Bengali to mean ghost, which generally refers to the spirit of a deceased person, or entity that has passed on. Among Bengali Muslims, supernatural entities are largely recognised as jin (Bengali: জিন, derived from Arabic jinn) or jin-bhoot (Bengali: জিন-ভূত).

In Bengali folktales, ghosts and similar concepts are believed to be the unsatisfied spirits of human beings who cannot find peace after death or the souls of people who died in unnatural or abnormal circumstances like murders, suicides or accidents. References to ghosts are often found in modern-day Bengali literature, cinema, radio and television media. There are also alleged haunted sites in the region.

== Types of ghosts and other supernatural entities ==
There are many kinds of ghosts and supernatural entities that frequently come up in Bengali culture and folklore. Ghosts have been important in the socio-cultural beliefs, superstitions and popular entertainment of the Bengali people. A few of these supernatural entities are mentioned here.

=== Jinn / Djinn ===
Most often believed by the Muslim community of Bengal, the Jinn are supernatural beings that are generally considered invisible and capable of affecting living beings with their actions. An important aspect of Jinn is that they are seen, as humans, to be accountable for their deeds in the eyes of God. Jinn are not necessarily good or bad, but are seen as intelligent and subtle beings. They have free will, and a Muslim may acknowledge when a jinn is influencing their life. Some may attribute circumstances in their lives to Jinn interference and in some rural areas, this may be where shamanistic rituals may be employed to ward them off (talismans, prayers, etc.). Some Jinn like to shapeshift and appear as snakes or humans, and may become malevolent if disturbed or harmed by a human. Some Jinns can haunt human residences, toilets, lakes, graveyards, morgues, hospitals and even the wilderness.

=== Boba Jinn ===
Sleep paralysis is often attributed in Bengali lore to a supernatural entity called the Jinn of "Boba" (Bengali: বোবা) (meaning muteness) or "Boba Jinn" (Bengali: বোবা জিন). This entity tries to strangle the victim in their sleep. The victims report themselves being unable to speak or move and often see the fearsome entity sitting over their chest as it strangles them. In Bangladesh, the phenomenon is called Bobaay Dhora (being struck by Boba).

=== Pari / Pori ===
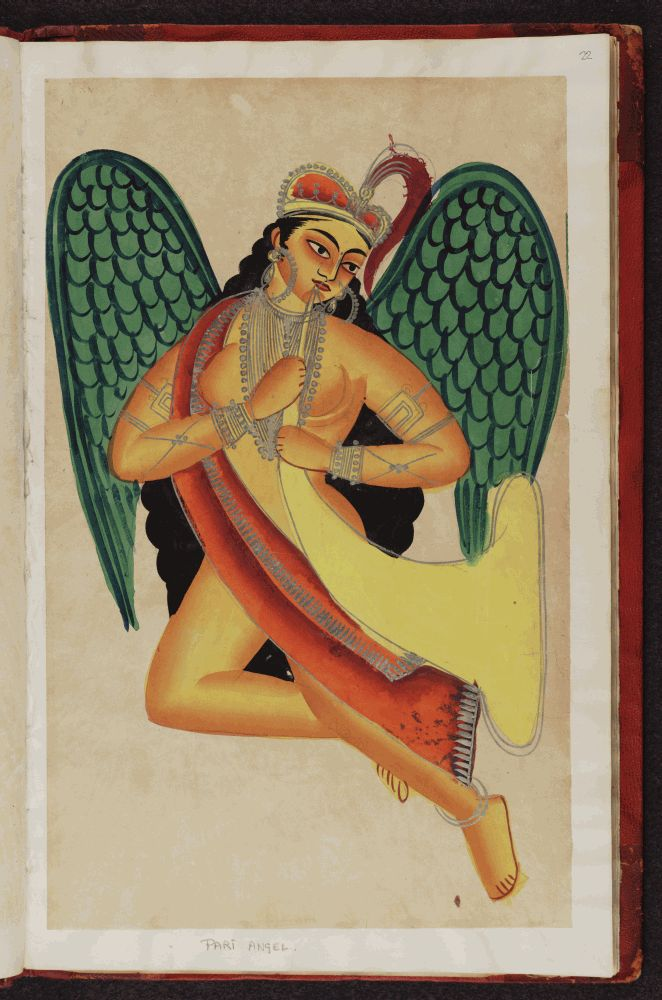
Kalighat painting of a pari

In Bangladeshi folklore, pori (also spelled parī) refers to a supernatural entity, similar to a fairy, often depicted as a beautiful, winged creature with a connection to Islamic/Persian mythology. They are known for their ethereal beauty and association with the unseen realm, sometimes interacting with humans, both positively and negatively.

=== Mamdo ===
Mamdo or Mamdo Bhoot (Bengali: মামদো ভূত) are ghosts of Bengali Muslims who died unnatural deaths. The word Mamdo (Bengali: মামদো), came from the word "mohammadiyah" (Bengali: মোহাম্মদিয়া), which means "followers of Muhammad". This name may have stemmed from the fact that Mamdo Bhoot's were thought to be the spirits of Muslims that had become spectral or ghost-like.

=== Petni ===
Petni is what a Churel is called in Bengal. This is a spirit that is typically described as 'the ghost of an unpurified living thing', and is often known to inhabit trees. The Churel is closely related to the lore of Petni and Shakchunni, other popular female supernatural entities in Bengali folk tales. In some Hindu beliefs, these spirits may become dakinis and serve the goddess Kali. In some areas of Bengal, a Petni is the ghost of a woman who died during childbirth or pregnancy. Some Petni's would come about if a woman died during her menstruation. The Petni may appear as a woman with distorted or monstrous features (blackened tongue, claw hands, large fangs, and wild hair), and her feet turned backwards (a common trait of South-Asian supernatural entities), or she may be a shapeshifter to lure humans towards her.

=== Aleya ===
Aleya is the name given to a strange phenomenon of light that happens near the marshes (similar to the will-o'-the-wisp), especially reported by the fishermen of West Bengal and Bangladesh. These so-called marsh lights often look like levitating orbs of fire that glow, which confuse fishermen, lure them in the water and drown them. Like the Nishi or the western idea of a siren, their voice is irresistible. Local people believe that these are the ghosts of fisherman who died whilst fishing. The fishermen of Sundarban delta region, especially the Khasti and Manna fishermen communities, strongly believe in these and always do an Atoshi-taron ritual before they go fishing.

=== Nishi Dak ===
In Bengali, nishi means 'night' or 'darkness' (নিশি), and dak means 'call' (ডাক). This refers to a spirit that calls out to humans in the middle of the night, or in the dark, but in a familiar voice. The nishi dak will prey on those who are alone, and use familiar voices to lure their victims to a secluded area before revealing themselves and killing their victims. Legend says that if one hears the voice of their loved one call out to them once or twice, it is Nishi trying to trick them into answering her call, which gives her the ability to consume the answering person's soul. If the call is heard for a third time, it is safe to answer since Nishi only calls out to a person twice. Those who hear about this the ‘Nishi Dak’ (night/darkness call) live in fear and are said to never go outside alone at night with the fear that they may be targeted.

=== Mechho Bhoot ===
The Mechho Bhoot is a famous spirit in Bengali folklore. Its name comes from the word “machh,” (Bengali: মাছ), meaning fish. These spirits live near village ponds or lakes, drawn to their love for fish. They can be playful, but they can also be dangerous. Fishing is very important to agriculture and economy in Bangladesh, as it is a riverine country with a variety of fish in the waters. According to folklore, those who suffer a death in the waters while fishing turn into Mechho Bhoots.

=== Begho Bhoot ===
The word Begho comes from the Bengali word meaning 'tiger'(বাঘ). A Begho Bhoot is the ghost of people who were killed or eaten by the tigers in the Sundarbans, which is also a sanctuary for the Royal Bengal Tiger in the Bengal region. These spirits and their characteristics may relate to the folklore of Dakshin Rai, a deity of the Sundarbans who ruled over beasts and demons, who sometimes appeared as a tiger.

Local folktale suggests that these apparitions frighten people who enters the jungle and lead them to tiger lairs. They are also said to make the noise of a tiger roar in order to scare villagers. Begho Bhoot is symbolic of the hardships of poor, working class people who often fall victim to their livelihoods.

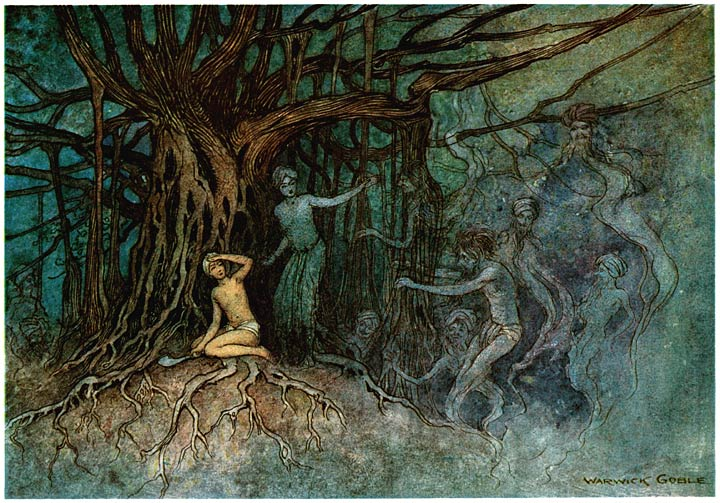
A benevolent Brahmadaitya saving a poor Brahmin man from a group of Bhoot (ghosts), while the man was cutting a branch from the yonder banyan tree or Ashwattha tree. An illustration by Warwick Goble (1912). Taken from the 1912 illustrated edition of Folk-Tales of Bengal by Lal Behari Dey.

=== Besho Bhoot ===
The word Besho comes from the word Baash which means 'Bamboo' in Bengali. It was believed that these harmful ghosts, called the Besho Bhoot, lived within bamboo gardens, and walking past these areas after dusk was considered dangerous. Another superstition states that if a bamboo plant is leaning or laying on the ground, no one should cross over it and should instead go around it, in fear that the bamboo would rise up unexpectedly by the spirit, and the person would die impaled by it. Strange weather phenomenons, such as gusty winds, were said to occur within the bamboo gardens whilst the weather elsewhere was fine.

=== Shakchunni ===
The word Shakchunni comes from the Sanskrit word Shankhachurni. It is usually described as the spirit of a married woman, wearing a special kind of traditional bangles made of shells (called ‘Shakha Pola'/'শাখা পলা’ in Bengali) around their arms, which is a sign of married Hindu women in Bengal. In Bangladeshi folklore (and sometimes India), Shakchunnis are different from Petnis, the former are said to live on top of trees and attack people who may disturb them. They are also imagined as invincible, able to be banished only through shamanistic rituals.

Most local folklores in West Bengal and India depict her as a young woman who entered matrimony with a prosperous individual. Regrettably, her marital union proved to be marked by cruelty and abuse inflicted upon her by her husband, ultimately culminating in her untimely demise. In these folklores Shakchunnis return as ghostly apparitions intending to take revenge on their erstwhile husbands.

Given her distressing experiences within her own marital life, she harbors an intense longing for a harmonious companionship. Consequently, she targets contentedly married women, subjugating and usurping their identities to perpetuate an illusion of matrimonial bliss on behalf of her victims.

In local folklores, Shakchunni is depicted as the exact opposite of traditional submissive Bengali women. They are depicted as evil, revenge-seeking, scary entities with pointy ears. Researchers of local folklores call this a subtle patriarchal message that women who deviate from a set societal expectations are as abhorrent as Shakchunni.

=== Pishachas ===
Pishachas are flesh-eating demons in Indian religious lore. They dwell in the dark and often haunt cremation grounds. They are also described as having shapeshifting abilities and invisibility. They are said to be able to possess human beings.

=== Rakkhosh ===
Rakkhosh is the Bengali form of the word Rakshasa, from Hindu mythology. They are demonic beings known for having a malevolent nature, ability to shapeshift, and other supernatural abilities. They are depicted as having thick fangs and sharp claws, their appearance varying depending on the story. They are prominently featured in the Hindu epics of Ramayana and Mahabharata, which establishes their creation myth of being created from Brahma's breath and then banished to Earth by the god Vishnu. Many fairytales from Bengal speak of these creatures, describing them as vicious beings who feed on humans. A common call of the rakkhosh in traditional Bengali folk-tales is this couplet: Hau, Mau, Khau,... manusher gondho pau(Bengali:হাঁউ মাঁউ খাঁউ,... মানুষের গন্ধ পাঁউ) The first three are gibberish words describing the opening of the mouth and the intention to devour, whilst the second phrase means "I smell humans". This is comparable to the "fi fie foe..." phrase associated with giants.

=== Daitya (Doitto) ===
The Daitya (or Doitto) (Sanskrit: दैत्य) look human, but possess extraordinary size and strength. They are similar to the giants.

=== Brahmodaitya ===
A Brahmodaitya is the ghost of a holy Brahmin, or the spirit of a priest and scholar from the highest Hindu caste. Depending on the story, these spirits may appear benevolent or malevolent. Many Bengali folktales and movies portray them as being very kind and helpful to the living.

Brahmodaitya reflects the rigid and discriminatory nature of caste hierarchies followed in the past. Socio-political experts point out the fact that most other ghosts in local folklores of Bengal are depicted as dark-skinned while Brahmodaitya is depicted as fair skinned and benevolent.

=== Damori ===
Tantric practices and black magic have been very popular in rural Bengal for centuries. Rural people from Bengal, obsessed with the occult, used to travel to the Kamrup-Kamakhya in Assam in order to learn the tantric ways and black magic. Many Sadhu (Ascetic Yogis), Tantric, Aghori, Kapalik and Kabiraj even devoted their lives to the pursuit of occult practices. Such people are said to have the power to invoke lower-level demonic entities such as Hakini, Shakhini (same as Shakchunni) and Dakini. Tantriks use these spirits either for divination or in order to inflict harm on others, with townspeople often seeking them in order to aid them in harming others. The most common practice was called "Baan Mara", a ritual used to kill the victim by inducing blood vomit. The two highest-level tantric mantra are the Kularnob and the Moha Damor, who included a lower level mantra named Bhoot Damor who referred to many different demi-goddesses. Damori is a name that refers to those supernatural entities conjured by the tantriks. In Tantra philosophy, if someone were to engage in ascetic pursuit and worship through the Bhoot Damor, the invoked Damori would appear to them and serve them. These beings are neither human nor ghostly, but exist in an in-between state, inhabitants of an unseen realm. They share similarities with the western concept of Fairies; or the Islamic/Persian concept of Pori / Pari.

=== Vetalas ===
Vetalas are a class of ghouls in Hindu mythology who are usually described as being knowledgeable paranormal entities that dwell in charnel grounds. They are characterized as evil spirits who haunt cemeteries and take possession of corpses as vehicles for movement. Vetalas are hostile spirits, but can be seen to protect or help humans in some folk tales.

Vetala may also link to Vetal or Betal as a Bhairava form of Shiva, a popular god in Goa.

One of the most well known pieces of fiction related to vetalas is the Vetala Panchavimshati, a collection of twenty-five stories part of the Kathasaritsagara, featuring a vetala as one of the two main characters. The story focuses on King Vikramaditya who is asked to capture a corpse hanging from a tree that stands in the middle of a cremation ground. This corpse is possessed by a vetala, who proposes to tell a king a story. Once the vetala finishes the story, it would ask the king a question that the king would have to answer. After the answer, the vetala would return to the corpse in the tree. This occurs another twenty-four times, after which the king is unable to answer the question. Impressed by the king, the vetala informs of the evil designs of the sorcerer that sent Vikramaditya to the cremation grounds. The vetala grants him a gift that would allow him to gain powers and defeat this sorcerer.

=== Jokkho / Jokkh ===
Jokkho / Jokkh are warrior-like entities who usually guard treasures in the earth. They are considered to be benevolent, able to bestow fertility and wealth upon their devotees. There is a commonly used Bengali idiom - Jokkher Dhon (literal meaning: Jokkho's Wealth) which means "protecting a beloved person" or "safeguarding precious wealth".

=== Shaytan ===
Shaytan/Shoytan (Bengali: শয়তান) is the Bengali word for "Satan" or "devil". It is a common term used in Bengali to refer to the evil entity or force in various religious and cultural contexts. In Islam, Shayateen (plural of Shaytan) refers to devils, which can be both Jinn and humans who are evil and actively work to misguide others. They are essentially the opposite of good and righteous beings, constantly trying to lead people away from the path of Allah.

== In festivals ==
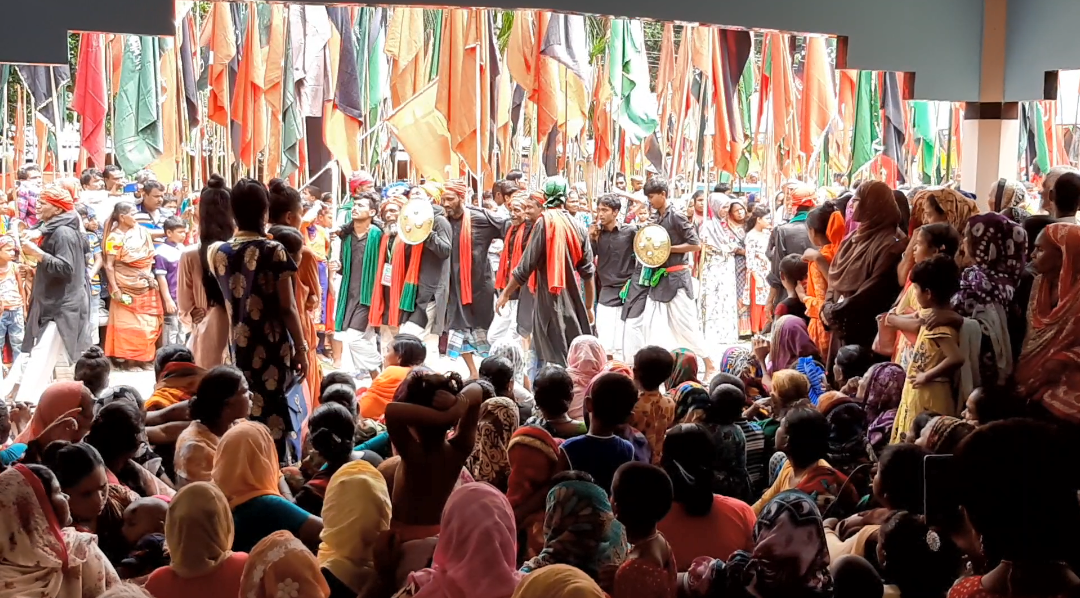
Ashura in Manikganj

=== Bhoot Chaturdashi ===
The 14th day of the Krishna Paksha (waning phase of the moon) which is also the night before Kali Puja and the second day of Dipaboli is celebrated as Bhoot Chaturdashi (translation, the fourteenth of ghosts) by Bengali Hindus. On this night, 14 earthen-lamps (choddo prodip) are lit at homes to appease the spirits of the past 14 generations of ancestors. It is believed that on the night before Kali Puja, the spirits of these ancestors descend upon the earth, and these lamps help them find their way home. Another popular belief is that Chamunda (a fearsome aspect of Kali) along with 14 other ghostly forms ward off the evil spirits from the house as 14 earthen-lamps are lit at different entrances and in the dark corners of the rooms. It is customary to consume a dish of 14 types of leafy vegetables (choddo shaak) during Bhoot Chaturdashi so that evil spirits are unable to possess the body.

== Alleged haunted places ==
=== Bangladesh ===
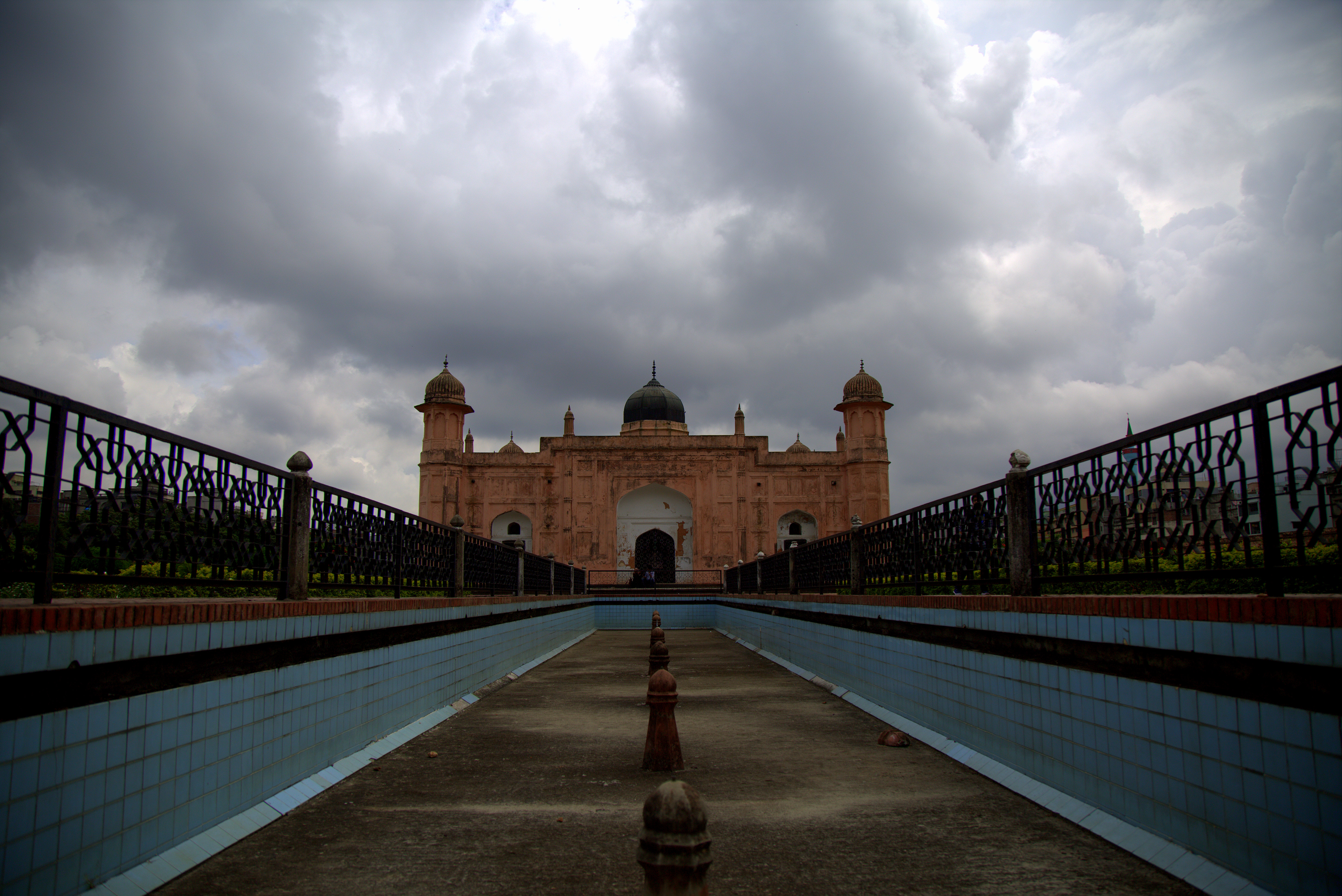
Lalbagh Fort in 2016

According to stories, Lalbagh Fort, Golf Heights Banani, Airport Road; Chalan Beel in Sirajganj, Pakri Beach, Mirsarai Highway Crossing in Chittagong and many other places in Bangladesh are claimed to be haunted.

- Airport Road, Dhaka is associated with the legend of a White Lady ghost supposedly seen by drivers.
- Dhaka Golf Heights, Banani, Dhaka: Claims include feelings of fear while walking past grave sites at night.
- Under-construction apartment in Old DOHS, Banani, Dhaka: One group of ghost hunters claim to have seen devil-worshipping signs written on walls at construction sites in Old DOHS Banani.
- Shahidullah Hall Pond, Dhaka: According to campus rumor, the pond adjoining Shahidullah Hall at Dhaka University campus is believed to be haunted.
- Farmhouse in Narsingdi: According to one local ghost hunting group, the house is haunted by the figure of a woman with climbing a tree.
- Farmhouse in Comilla: According to one ghost hunting group, a farmhouse in Comilla is reported to be haunted.

=== West Bengal, India ===
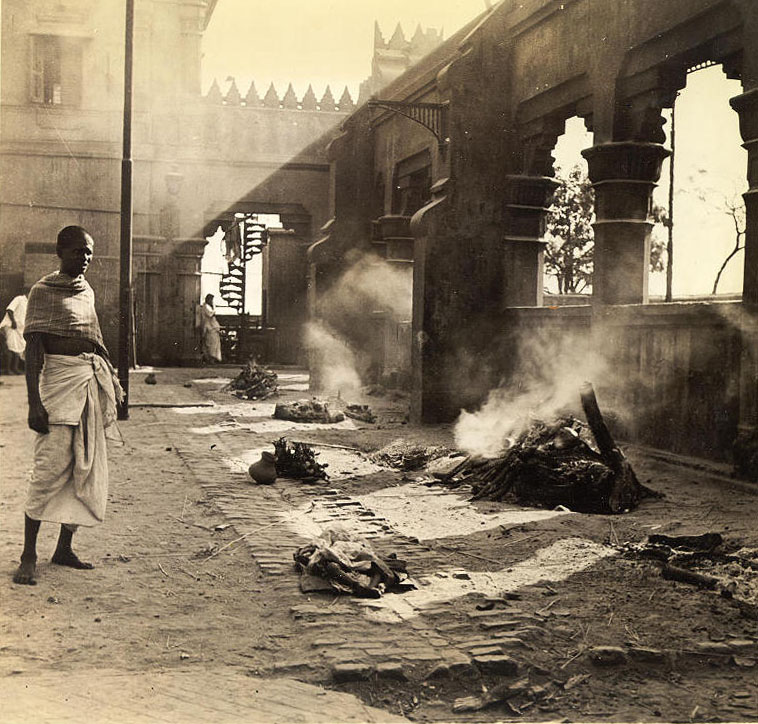
Nimtala Burning Ghat, Calcutta, 1945

- National Library of Kolkata
- Nimtala crematorium, Kolkata: According to legend, this site in central Kolkata is haunted by the ghosts of those who were cremated there.
- Putulbari or the House of Dolls, Kolkata: According to believers, the site is haunted by the souls of the dead.
- Hastings House, Alipore, Kolkata: According to legend, students have seen ghosts on the grounds.
- Writers' Building, Kolkata: According to legend, this residence of junior servants and administrative staff is haunted.
- Mullick Ghat and Zanana Bathing Ghat The Ganges - Under Howrah Bridge, Kolkata: Believers claim that many spirits wander the sacred river.

== In popular culture ==
Ghosts, other similar supernatural entities, as well as tales of paranormal powers (such as clairvoyance, psychic phenomenon etc.) are plots for many short stories and novels in modern-day Bengali literature. Some classic literature and folk-lore are also based on such plots. The number of Bengali films of this genre are small in number compared to the western world. Multiple radio and TV programs also feature stories of people's paranormal experiences. Common people of both Bangladesh and West Bengal love the supernatural thrills, and the personal stories of people's paranormal experiences are hot topics for gossip, rumours and hangout discussions among friends and family.

=== Literature ===
Literary works involving ghostly/demonic beings is one of the most popular genres in Bengali literature. In the early days, ghosts were the only ingredients of Bengali folk-tales and fairy-tales. Lal Behari Dey collected many folk-tales of Bengal, and translated them in English. His book called Folk-Tales of Bengal, first published in 1883, features many amazing folk-tales associated with ghostly and supernatural beings.

Thakurmar Jhuli is the most classic collection of Bengali children's folk-tales and fairy-tales, which was compiled by Dakshinaranjan Mitra Majumder in 1907. There we can find many different categories of supernatural entities (such as Rakkhosh) featuring in different stories. Other such story collection from the same author are Thakurdadar Jhuli (1909), Thandidir Tholay (1909) and, Dadamoshayer Tholay (1913).

Many Bengali writers have practiced the genre of supernatural/horror in their short stories, novels, and others forms of literary works. Some are mentioned below:

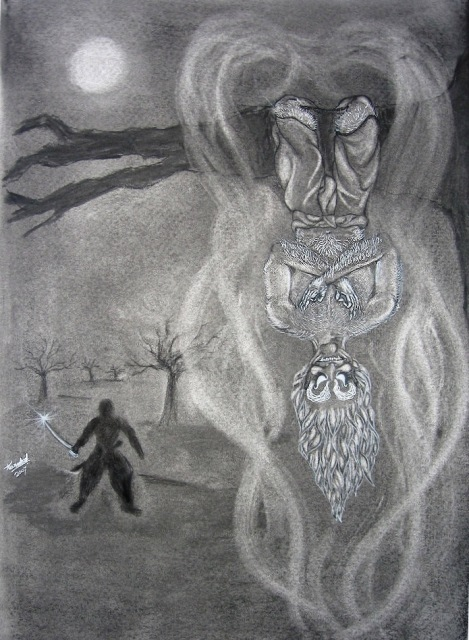
Depiction of Vetala hanging by a tree and King Vikramaditya in the background (from Betaal Panchabinsati)

- Bibhutibhushan Bandyopadhyay: Although known for his social novels set in rural Bengal, such as Pather Panchali, Adarsha Hindu Hotel, and Aranyak, this writer also wrote short-stories involving the supernatural, such as Medal, Rankini Devir Khorgo, Maya, Obhisapto, Chele-dhora, Kashi kobirajer Golpo, Bhoitik Palonko, Kobirajer Bipod, Ashoriri, and the first two short stories featuring Taranath Tantrik, etc. Taranath Tantrik is a classic character in Bengali literature when it comes to supernatural and paranormal stories. Taranath Tantrik is a mystic figure and practitioner of the occult. He is an astrologer by profession, and had many encounters with the supernatural in his extensive travels throughout the towns and villages of Bengal. He shares these experiences with a few friends in his Mott Lane house over cups of tea and cigarettes.
- Hemendra Kumar Roy: Hemendra Kumar Roy is credited for introducing vampire to Bengali literature.
- Humayun Ahmed: Humayun Ahmed, arguably the most popular writer in post-liberation Bangladesh, wrote many stories and novels involving ghosts and the paranormal. His character Misir Ali is depicted as a part-time professor of parapsychology, who also solve baffling cases associated with the paranormal. Some of Humayun Ahmed's novels feature Himu, who is depicted to have supernatural abilities, is haunted by post-mortal presence of his father who guides him to follow the way to become a modern-day saint. Humayun has also written many ghost stories, both for adult and children.
- Ishwar Chandra Vidyasagar: This writer wrote the free adopted Bengali translation of 11th century Sanskrit horror stories/tales collection within one frame story called Betaal Panchabinsati (meaning "Twenty-five [Tales] of the Phantom") in 1847. The hero of this series is King Vikramaditya, the legendary emperor of Ujjain, India. King faces many difficulties in bringing the Betaal (a demonic being) to the tantric. Each time the king tries to capture the Betaal, it tells a story that ends with a riddle. If the king cannot answer the question correctly, the phantom consents to remain in captivity. If the king knows the answer but still keeps quiet, then his head shall burst into thousand pieces. And if King Vikram answers the question correctly, the phantom would escape and return to his tree. He knows the answer to every question; therefore the cycle of catching and releasing the phantom continues twenty-four times till the last question puzzles the king.
- Leela Majumdar: Leela Majumdar wrote many ghost stories for children. Her ghost story collection features in her book Sob Bhuture.
- Manik Bandopadhyay: This literary legend of classic Bengali novels has also written many short-stories among which a few are horror stories, such as Holudpora, Chobir Bhoot etc.
- Manoj Basu: Well known for his novel Nishikutumbo, prolific writer and poet Manoj Basu also wrote several classic ghost stories such as Jamai, Paatal-konna, Lal Chul, etc.
- Muhammed Zafar Iqbal: Although well known for his science fiction novels, he has also written a few novels of the supernatural/horror genre, such as Pret (1983), Pishachini (1992), Nishikonna (2003), Chayalin (2006), O (2008), and Danob (2009).
- Parashuram (Rajshekhar Basu) is the writer of the ghost story Bhushundir Mathe which is a comedy in the mould of horror. Parashuram wrote many other ghost stories like Mahesher Mahajatra which also impart an undertone of humor.
- Rabindranath Tagore: Nobel Laureate poet and writer Rabindranath also authored some short ghost stories like Konkal, Monihara, Mastermoshay, Nishithe, Khudhito Pashan etc., which are considered classics of this genre.
- Sailajananda Mukhopadhyay: This noted Bengali novelist wrote a few horror short-stories such as Namaskar, Ke Tumi, etc.
- Sasthipada Chattopadhyay: He wrote detective fiction, adventure stories, and horror stories for children and young adults. His ghost stories are collected in the book - Ponchasti Bhuter Golpo (2001), and Aro Ponchasti Bhuter Golpo (2015).
- Satyajit Ray: Satyajit Ray, the Indian film maker, was quite popular in Bengal for his short stories. His favorite genres were fantasy and supernatural stories. His stories featuring Tarini Khuro, who is an aged bachelor, tells interesting stories based on his weird experiences, and many of these stories border on being horror or spooky, while some of the stories depict the smartness and quick wit of Tarini Khuro. One of Satyajit Ray's characters is Professor Shonku, and some stories featuring Professor Shonku are also based on paranormal or supernatural mysteries such as Professor Shonku o Bhoot.
- Sharadindu Bandyopadhyay: Another writer known for his detective series featuring Byomkesh Bakshi, has also authored a series called Baroda series. Baroda is a Bengali guy who is very much interested in the paranormal and likes to share his adventures and experiences of supernatural incidents with his friends. Sharadindu has also written some ghost stories such as Kamini, Dehantor, Bhoot Bhabishyat etc.
- Shirshendu Mukhopadhyay: This writer has also authored some humorous ghost stories. The specialty of his ghost stories is that his ghosts are innocent, kind and funny characters who always help the poor and needy, and punish the wicked person. Goshaibaganer Bhoot (The Ghost of Gosain Bagan) is one of his famous children's fiction, which was later adopted as a film in 2011. Popular Bengali film Goynar Baksho (2013) and Chhayamoy (2013) was also adapted from his novels. His ghostly short-story collection is featured in his book, Bhoutik Golposhomogro.
- Sukumar Ray: This writer has written some humorous literary pieces (e.g. short stories, humorous poetry) for children featuring weird and fictitious paranormal/hybrid animals, and even ghosts.
- Sunil Gangopadhyay: This writer has written some ghost stories for children. His book Rahashamaya Bhuter Galpa features some of his ghostly short stories.
- Syed Mujtaba Ali: This writer brought ghostly flavour in his novel Abishwasyo.
- Syed Mustafa Siraj: Basically known for his detective series featuring Colonel Niladri Sarkar. Siraj is also the creator of a series involving paranormal, featuring Murari Babu. Murari Babu is depicted as an innocent and nervous person living in Kolkata city, and his hobby is to collect old furniture from antique shops. Yet, his hobby always finds a way to get him into troubles relating to the paranormal. Siraj's horror short stories collection is featured in his book Bhoutik Golposhomogro.
- Taradas Bandyopadhyay: Taradas Bandyopadhyay's father, the legendary literati Bibhutibhushan Bandyopadhyay created the character 'Taranath Tantrik', but he wrote only two short stories featuring this character. Rest of the stories featuring Taranath Tantrik is written by Taradas Bandyopadhyay in two books called - Taranath Tantrik (1985), and Olatchokro (2003).
- Tarasankar Bandyopadhyay: Leading novelist Tarasankar also wrote a few horror short-stories such as Daaini, Bhulor Chholona, etc.
- Troilokyanath Mukhopadhyay: He used ghosts in a humorous and satirical way in his novels and stories; and created a new genre in Bengali literature, which was pioneering, and is still followed today by many Bengali writers. Bhoot O Manush, Nayanchandrer Bebsha, Lullu, Damru Charit, Kankaboti are few of his classics.
- Upendra Kishore Roychowdhury: He is one of the most talented author of children's literature of his time, and also noted for his ghost stories where the ghosts are harmless, fun-loving, and benevolent entities. Goopy Gyne Bagha Byne, Jola O Saat Bhoot, etc. are his stories involving ghosts.

Other than the writers mentioned above, other prominent writers of Bengal have also written short stories involving ghosts and the supernatural, such as Provatkumar Mukhopadhyay, Achintya Kumar Sengupta, Satinath Bhaduri, Buddhadeb Bosu and so on. However, at the present day, some young Bengali horror story writers are being somewhat influenced by the western horror literature, and their writings thus lack the originality of the classic Bengali horror literature and ghost stories.

=== Cinema ===
Classic Bengali films with horror/supernatural plot are only a handful. Kankal (1950), Hanabari (1952), Monihara of the Teen Kanya movie anthology (1961) Kuheli (1971), were quite popular horror/supernatural thriller flick in the era of Bengali black and white movies.

There are only a few modern Bangladeshi horror movies and most of these movies can be typically categorized as low-budget horror-comedy. Few such examples are Rokto Pipasha (2007), Daini Buri (2008) and, Sedin Brishti Chilo (2014). Some Bangladeshi movies involving supernatural theme are stories about shapeshifting snakes or Ichchhadhari Nag that can take human form. Examples of such movies are Kal Naginir Prem, Bishakto Nagin, Bishe Bhora Nagin (1999), Sathi Hara Nagin (2011) etc.

In many Bengali films, ghosts are depicted in a lightly comical mood and sometimes in a friendly way. One of the examples is Goopy Gyne Bagha Byne (1969) as mentioned earlier is adopted from the story of Upendra Kishore Roychowdhury and directed by Satyajit Ray. In this film the King of Ghosts gives three boons to 'Goopy' and 'Bagha', the two poor village boys who aspired to become a singer and drummer respectively. With the help of those boons they had amazing adventures. The film is the first film of the Goopy Gyne Bagha Byne series, followed by a couple of sequels - Hirak Rajar Deshe was released in 1980; and Goopy Bagha Phire Elo, written by Ray, but directed by his son Sandip Ray, was released in 1992.

Nishi Trishna (1989), directed by Parimal Bhattacharya was the first Bengali vampire movie, starring Shekhar Chatterjee, Prasenjit Chatterjee and Moon Moon Sen. In this movie, some friends plan to visit the infamous Garchampa Palace which had a bad reputation for demonic blood-sucking beings that were terrorising the locality. They ultimately solve the mystery, and kill the vampire and his mentor.

Putuler Protisodh (1998), directed by Rabi Kinagi, was also based on the supernatural. The movie's story revolves around a girl named Bini who was married to Avinash. She falls prey in the hands of her in-laws who ultimately murdered her. The soul of Bini enters her doll to take revenge. She kills her mother-in-law, father-in-law and her maternal uncle one by one, and finally wants to kill her husband. But Avinash's second wife Laxmi was able to free Bini's soul from the doll.

Jekhane Bhooter Bhoy (2012), directed by Sandip Ray, is a movie based on three classic Bengali ghost stories. The stories are Satyajit Ray's Anath Babur Bhoy, Brown Saheber Bari and, Sharadindu Bandyopadhyay's Bhoot Bhabishyat.

Probably the most well-known film of horror genre in recent times is Bhooter Bhabishyat (2012), directed by Anik Dutta. It tells the story of a haunted mansion 'Choudhury Palace', where ghosts from different ethnic backgrounds and eras reside (a Bengali zamindar of 18th century, an actress of the 1930s, a modern rockstar, a soldier of Indian Army who died in Kargil, etc.). The film with its simple but humorous story went on to become a massive blockbuster of 2012.

Goynar Baksho (2013) is another popular film involving the supernatural. The film, directed by Aparna Sen, is an adaptation of Shirshendu Mukhopadhyay's tale of 3 generations of women & their changing position in society as seen in relation to a box of jewels, handed down from one generation to the next.

Chhayamoy (2013) is another notable horror movie based on Shirshendu Mukhopadhyay's novel of the same name. The story is about Indrajit, a UK based scholar. While working to preserve historical documents he find a parchment from which he learns about treasures hidden in an old palace in Simulgarh, a village of West Bengal. Indrajit comes to the village, finds out the treasure, but, a local goon Gagan Sapui accuses him of robbery, beats him up and expels him out of the village. Sapui wants to melt those coins to make new jewellery. After being beaten up, Indrajit goes to forest near the village where he meets Chhayamoy, a benevolent ghost. After listening the incidence from Indrajit, Chhayamoy decides to teach Gagan a lesson.

=== Radio, television and online streaming platforms ===
A live radio program called Bhoot FM was aired by Bangladeshi radio channel Radio Foorti 88.0 FM at 12:00 am, every Friday night. The program started airing on 13 August 2010; and was hosted by RJ Russell. In this program, people from all over Bangladesh used to come and share their real-life experiences associated with ghosts, demons, jinns and the paranormal/supernatural. The Bengali community from all over the world also used to share their supernatural experiences by sending audio clips and emails that were played/read in this program.This program came to an end in the year 2019 but right now another program named "Bhoot Dot COM" is being hosted by RJ Russell aired by Shadhin Radio.Other such radio program was Dor, aired by ABC Radio 89.2 FM. Dor was recorded from different haunted places of Bangladesh, and is hosted by RJ Kebria along with RJ Suman and tarot card reader Radbi Reza. Similar kind of programs were also aired on TV channels, such as Moddhorater Train (meaning 'Midnight Train') by Maasranga Television.

There are some radio programs which feature recitation of horror stories. Such radio program is Sunday Suspense by Radio Mirchi, aired from Kolkata, which features recitation of horror stories, as well as stories of other genres such as detective fiction, fantasy, and Sci-fi, etc. Similar such radio program is Kuasha, aired by ABC Radio 89.2 FM from Bangladesh, which features horror stories written by writers, and also stories sent by listeners of the program.

Pett Kata Shaw, a 2021 anthology series released on Chorki (OTT), features the modern revival of the mysterious and lurid folklores of Mechho Bhoot, Jinn, Kanabhulo and Nishi.

== See also ==
- Culture of Bengal
- List of ghosts
