= Kamu Mukherjee =

Indian Bengali actor (1931–2003)

Kamu Mukherjee (14 June 1931 – 6 December 2003) was a Bengali actor, best known for his role as Mandar Bose in Sonar Kella and Harun-al-Rashid in Sandip Ray's first film Phatik Chand.

== Career ==
Mukherjee's first film appearance was in the 1959 film Sonar Harin with Uttam Kumar, Chhabi Biswas and Bhanu Bandopadhyay. He had gone to Satyajit Ray's house and approached Ray to act in his films and, thereafter, he worked with Ray in nine films. Mukherjee is known for his performances in different types of roles, both serious and comic, in Ray's films. His acting in the knife throwing scene in the film Joi Baba Felunath is one of the more remembered scenes from the filmmaker's oeuvre. He also starred in the films of Goutam Ghosh, Buddhadev Dashgupta and Arabinda Mukhopadhyay. Mukherjee died at the age of 72 on 6 December 2003 from rheumatoid arthritis in his home in Kolkata.

== Selected filmography ==
- Sonar Harin (1959) as Abdulla
- Charulata (1964) as cameo (uncredited)
- Nayak (1966) as Pritish
- Kokhono Megh (1968) as Sotu Basak
- Kamallata (1969)
- Goopy Gyne Bagha Byne (1969) as cameo (uncredited)
- Nishachar (1971)
- Mouchak (1974)
- Sonar Kella (1974) as Mandar Bose
- Sawamsiddha
- Hangsaraj (1976)
- Shatranj Ke Khilari (1977)
- Joi Baba Felunath (1979) as Arjun, the knife thrower
- Paka Dekha (1980) as a police constable
- Heerak Rajar Deshe (1980) as sentry in the treasury
- Phatik Chand (1983) as Harun
- Paar (1984) as the sardar of a jute mill
- Abir
- Phera (1988) as Mantu Dutta
- Shakha Proshakha (1990) as a domestic help at the Majumder house
- Goopy Bagha Phire Elo (1992)
