= Anup Ghoshal =

Background information
- Born: 1944/1945; Calcutta, Bengal Presidency, British India
- Died: 15 December 2023 Kolkata, West Bengal, India
- Genres: Indian Classical Music; playback singing; film music
- Occupations: Singer, composer
- Instrument: Vocalist
- Years active: 1968–2023

Anup Ghoshal (1944/1945 – 15 December 2023) was an Indian playback singer and composer in Hindi and other vernacular Indian films, especially Bengali-language. He was known in his native Bengal primarily as one of the foremost artists of the golden age of Nazrulgeeti (c. 1930s–1970s).

== Biography ==
Anup Ghoshal was born in 1944 or 1945 to Amulya Chandra Ghoshal and Labanya Ghoshal. His mother encouraged his singing by arranging for his musical training at age 4. His first performance took place soon after, when he sang for a children's programme, Shishu Mahal, from All India Radio, Kolkata.

Ghoshal's music lessons continued until he was about 26 years of age. During his studies, he became a master of Thumri, Kheyal, Bhajan, Ragpradhan, Rabindra Sangeet, Nazrulgeeti, Dwijendrageeti, Rajnikanter Gaan, modern Bengali songs, and several other folk songs. He received music lessons from teachers such as Sangeetacharya Tarapada Chakraborty and Sangeetacharya Sukhendu Goswami. He learned Rabindra Sangeet from Debabrata Biswas and learned different Bengali songs from Manindra Chakraborty.

Ghoshal earned a university degree in Humanities from Asutosh College, Kolkata and a Master's degree and Ph.D. from Rabindra Bharati University. His thesis was titled "Nazrulgeeti — Roop O Rashanabhuti". During his studies, he took part in many music competitions in which he secured the highest marks in different classical, light classical, Bengali songs (traditional and modern), Rabindra Sangeet, and folk songs.

Ghoshal stood first in 'Sangeet Bharati Degree Examination' in 1966—1967 and was awarded a gold medal. He was a National Scholar, selected in 1966—1967.

Ghoshal's first venture into movies as a playback singer was at the age of 19, when he sang for the movie Goopy Gyne Bagha Byne, written and directed by Satyajit Ray. His association with Ray continued, sometimes as an assistant music director, and he eventually won the National Award in 1981 for Hirak Rajar Deshe. He sang for various Bengali and Hindi movies, as well as in Bhojpuri and Assamese films.

Ghoshal visited the UK, USA, Canada, and Germany for various musical concerts. Up until his death, he visited Western countries to promote Indian musical culture with references to Bengali songs along with folk songs of Bengal. He also wrote a book on Indian Music, Ganer Bhubane. Ghoshal was elected as one of the members of the West Bengal Legislative Assembly from Uttarpara Assembly constituency (Hooghly 185) as a candidate of All India Trinamool Congress, headed by Mamata Banerjee in 2011.

== Death ==
Anup Ghoshal died in Kolkata on 15 December 2023, at the age of 78.

== Accolades and awards ==
Ghoshal was offered honorary citizenship of Chicago in 1994 by Mayor Richard M. Daley, as well as other awards:

- Gold Medal in Sangeet Bharati Degree Examination in 1967—1968.
- 1992 Bengal Film Journalists' Association – Best Male Playback Award for the Bengali film Goopy Bagha Phire Elo
- 1983 Bengal Film Journalists' Association – Best Male Playback Award for the Hindi film Masoom
- 1981 National Film Award for Best Male Playback Singer for the Bengali film Hirak Rajar Deshe
- 1971 Bengal Film Journalists' Association – Best Male Playback Award for the Bengali film Sagina Mahato

== Selected filmography ==
As playback singer

- Goopy Gyne Bagha Byne
- Hirak Rajar Deshe
- Goopy Bagha Phire Elo
- Sasti
- Atattatar Din Porey
- Nayikar Bumikay
- Kabi
- Chhadabeshi
- Jiban Jerakam
- Nimantran
- Phuleswari
- Biraj Bou
- Mohun Baganer Meye
- Subarnagolok
- Bancharamer Bagan
- Harmonium
- Ek Je Chhilo Desh
- Ajab Gayer Ajab Kotha
- Sagina Mahato
- Nishantey (1985)

Popular songs

- Tujse Naraaz Nahi Zindagi from Masoom
- Husn Bhi Aap Hain, Ishq Bhi Aap Hain
- Tum saath ho zindagi bhar key liyey from Sheeshay ka ghar

As music director

- Sagina Mahato
