= Tapen Chatterjee =

Indian actor

- Born: 3 September 1937; Calcutta, Bengal Presidency, British India
- Died: 24 May 2010 (aged 72); Kolkata, West Bengal, India
- Occupation: Actor
- Known for: Goopy Gyne Bagha Byne (1969); Heerak Rajar Deshe (1980); Goopy Bagha Phire Elo (1991)

Tapen Chatterjee (3 September 1937 – 24 May 2010) was a Bengali actor from India who played several roles in Satyajit Ray's films, notably as Goopy Gyne in Goopy Gyne Bagha Byne (1968), and its sequels Heerak Rajar Deshe (1980) and Goopy Bagha Phire Elo (1992). Chatterjee died on 24 May 2010 at the age of 72. He was suffering from pulmonary ailments.

== Career ==
As a qualified engineer, Chatterjee had a job in Rajasthan, following which he came back to Kolkata and joined Sandesh, the Bengali magazine revived by Satyajit Ray. He started his career in the advertisement department of the children's magazine Sandesh. Ray cast him in a cameo in Mahanagar and then famously as the singer Goopy Gyne in Goopy Gyne Bagha Byne. The song Aaha Ki Aananda Aakshe Batashe filmed on him Goopy and Rabi Ghosh as Bagha Byne still stirs the memory of the Bengali film lovers.

== Filmography ==
Year	Title	Role	Notes
1963	Mahanagar		
1969	Goopy Gyne Bagha Byne	Goopy Gyne	
1970	Rupasi	Handa, Balaram's brother	
1971	Dhanyee Meye	Sabitri's brother	
1973	Shriman Prithviraj	School Sentry	
1973	Nanigopaler Biye	Dilip	
1974	Sangini		
1974	Bikele Bhorer Phul		
1974	Thagini		
1977	Bhola Moira (film)		
1977	Hate Raila Tin		
1979	Ganadevata	Tara	
1980	Heerak Rajar Deshe	Goopy Gayen	
1991	Goopy Bagha Phire Elo	Goopy	
1996	Rabibar		
1997	Sriman Bhootnath		
2009	Narak Guljar		(final film role)
