= Bengal Film Journalists' Association – Best Male Playback Award =

Indian film award

Here is a list of the recipients of the Bengal Film Journalists' Association award for Best Male Playback Singer and the films for which they won.

Year	Singer	Film
2007	Pranjan Bakshi	Bhalobasar Anek Naam
2006	Babul Supriyo	Subho Drishti
2005	Nachiketa Chakraborty	Samudra Sakshi
2004	Kharaj Mukherjee	Patal Ghar
2003	Babul Supriyo	Tak Jhal Mishti
2002	Srikanto Acharya	Titli
2001	Abhijeet	Prem Geet Bhalobasha
2000	Ajoy Chakraborty
1999	Indranil Sen
1998
1997	Kumar Sanu	Laathi
1996	Kumar Sanu	Kecho Khurte Keute
1995	Ajoy Chakraborty	Abbajan
1994
1993
1992	Anup Ghoshal	Goopy Bagha Phire Elo
1991
1990
1989	Shibaji Chatterjee	Sudhu Tomari
1988	Manna Dey	Lalon Fakir
1987	Kishore Kumar	Abhimaan
1986	Shibaji Chatterjee	Bhalobasa Bhalobasa
1985
1984
1983
1982
1981	Anup Ghoshal	Hirak Rajar Deshe
1980
1979	Sagar Sen	Parichay
1978
1977
1976	Hemanta Mukherjee	Priya Bandhobi
1975	Hemanta Mukherjee	Phuleswari
1974	Dwijen Mukherjee	Bon Palashir Padabali
1973	Manna Dey	Stree
1972	Hemanta Mukherjee	Dhanyi Meye
1971	Anup Ghoshal	Sagina Mahato
1970	Manna Dey	Chira Diner
1969	Shyamal Mitra	Apanjan
1968	Manna Dey	Antony Firingee
1967	Manna Dey	Shankhya Bela
1966	Kishore Kumar	Ektuku Choya Lage
1965	Manna Dey	Kanchan Jangha
1964
1963
1962
1961
1960
1959
1958
1957
1956
1955
1954
1953
1952
1951
1950
1949
1948
1947
1946
1945
1944
1943
1942

== See also ==
- Bengal Film Journalists' Association Awards
- Cinema of India
