= Phatik Chand (film) =

- Directed by: Sandip Ray
- Based on: Phatik Chand by Satyajit Ray
- Starring: See below
- Cinematography: Soumendu Roy
- Edited by: Dulal Dutta
- Music by: Satyajit Ray
- Release date: 1983
- Country: India
- Language: Bengali

Phatik Chand is a Bengali children's film directed by Sandip Ray based on the novel of Satyajit Ray by the same name. This was the directorial debut of Sandip Ray, and was released in 1983. This film received Best feature film award at the International Children's Film Festival in Vancouver in 1984.

== Plot ==
Bablu Sanyal, a Kolkata based boy is kidnapped by a gang while returning from school. But they have a car accident and Bablu loses his memory. The driver and one more kidnapper died on the spot, while the other two crooks, Shyamlal and Raghu, ran away leaving the unconscious Bablu presuming he is dead. Harun, a juggler and Bohemian street magician, saves him. Bablu calls himself Fatik Chandra Pal since he can not recall his original name. Meanwhile, Bablu's father Saradindu Sanyal advertises in the papers offering a huge reward for information about his son. Shyamlal and Raghu suddenly discover Bablu with Harun and attack them but Harun escapes with Bablu. The film runs with the story of the emotional bond of love and affection between Bablu and Harun. Finally Bablu alias Fatik regains his memory, returns to his home with the help of Harun. When Bablu's father offers the prize money to Harun, he refuses saying he can't take money for taking care of his brother.

== Cast ==
- Kamu Mukherjee as Harun
- Rajib Ganguly as Phatik or Bablu
- Biplab Chatterjee as Shyamlal
- Haradhan Bannerjee as Saradindu Sanyal
- Kaushik Banerjee
- Kamal Deb as Raghu
- Kartik Chatterji as Astrologer
- Tarun Mitra as Police officer
- Bhishma Guhathakurta
- Alpna Gupta
- Ashok Mukherjee
- Ramesh Mukherjee
