= Bijoya Ray =

Indian actress

- Born: Bijoya Das; 27 October 1917; Patna, British Indian
- Died: 2 June 2015 (aged 97); Kolkata, West Bengal, India
- Spouse: Satyajit Ray (m. 1949)
- Children: Sandip Ray

Bijoya Ray (née Das; 27 October 1917 – 2 June 2015) was the wife of the Indian filmmaker Satyajit Ray. Their son Sandip Ray is also a film director. Bijoya and Satyajit were first cousins. Bijoya's father was the eldest half brother of Satyajit Ray's mother. After a long courtship, they were married in 1949. Bijoya Ray acted and sang playback song in a Bengali feature film called Shesh Raksha in 1944 and also acted in the documentary Gaach (The Tree) by Catherine Berge in 1998. She died in Kolkata on 2 June 2015, aged 97, after suffering from acute pneumonia.

== Early life and education ==
Bijoya Ray was born as Bijoya Das in Patna to Charu Chandra Das, a barrister and Madhuri Devi, younger sister of nationalist leader 'Deshbandhu' C R Das's wife Basanti Devi. She was the youngest of four daughters. One of her elder siblings Sati Devi was a well-known singer and musical exponent who worked with Uday Shankar in Almora and at Prithvi Theatre in Bombay and her daughter Ruma Guha Thakurta was a well-known personality in music and the acting world who was formerly married to the legendary singer Kishore Kumar. Her paternal aunt was Kanak Das (Biswas), an established singer. She is also related to Atul Prasad Sen, the legendary Bengali composer, singer, lawyer and philanthropist.

Bijoya grew up in Patna and was educated in a convent. She had a gifted voice and her father wanted to send her to Paris to be trained in soprano and western classical music. In 1931, when she was thirteen her father died and she and her mother and sisters had to come to Calcutta to her paternal uncle Prasant Das's house. It was here that she met her first cousin Satyajit. They were drawn to each other very soon and their common interests were Film and western classical music. She graduated from the Jogamaya Devi College, an affiliated undergraduate women's college of the historic University of Calcutta, in Kolkata. After graduating, she worked as a teacher at Bethune School and Kamala Girls School, Kolkata and also as a clerk in a government office for a brief time. She left her job and went to Bombay to start a film career.

== Career ==
She worked in a few films without success or satisfaction. In 1949 she married Satyajit Ray. Their only son Sandip was born in 1953. Bijoya Ray remained a constant inspiration and influence in Ray's life. After her husband died in 1992, she lived in Calcutta with her son Sandip, daughter-in-law Lalita and grandson Saurodip. She wrote an autobiography "Amader Kotha (আমাদের কথা ISBN 81-7756-687-3)" which was published by Ananda Publishers. She died on 2 June 2015 at the age of 97 after suffering from Pneumonia.

== Filmography ==
- Shesh Raksha (1944)
- Mashaal (1950)
