= Santosh Dutta =

Indian actor (1925–1988)

- সন্তোষ দত্ত
- Dutta in Mahapurush (1965)
- Born: 2 December 1925; Village Sonapalashi, Burdwan Bengal Presidency, British India
- Died: 8 February 1988 (aged 62); Calcutta, West Bengal, India
- Occupations: Actor, criminal lawyer
- Children: 1

Santosh Dutta (Bengali: সন্তোষ দত্ত; 2 December 1925 – 8 February 1988) was a Bengali actor, best known for playing the character of Jatayu in Satyajit Ray's Feluda movie series Sonar Kella and Joi Baba Felunath.

== Early life ==
Dutta was a lawyer by profession. Essentially a comedian, he elevated comedy acting to the levels of character roles. Satyajit Ray gave him the first break with a small role in his immortal film Parash Pathar. After Sonar Kella, he became so associated with the role of "Jatayu" that Satyajit Ray later reframed the appearance of Jatayu and started making the sketches of Jatayu resembling Dutta in Feluda novels. After the death of this actor, Ray once remarked that there will be no further movies in the Feluda series as Jatayu cannot be thought of without Santosh Dutta. Though after the death of Ray, the role of Jatayu was later played by artists such as Anup Kumar, Bibhu Bhattacharya, and even Rabi Ghosh. These actors agreed that it was impossible to play the character without the influence of Santosh Dutta in mind.

== Career ==
Apart from playing Jatayu, Dutta played crucial roles in Satyajit Ray's masterpieces for children like Goopy Gyne Bagha Byne and Hirak Rajar Deshe. In Goopy Gayen Bagha Bayen, Dutta played dual roles of the kings of "Halla" and "Shundi". In Hirak Rajar Deshe, which is a sequel to Goopy Gayen Bagha Bayen, Dutta played the role of a mysterious scientist (known as Gobeshok Gobuchondro Gyanotirtho Gyanorotno Gyanambudhi Gyanochuramoni), in addition to a small appearance for the same 'King of Shundi'.

Another milestone in Dutta's career was playing Gopal Bhar in the film of the same name. Gopal Bhar being a humorous character known for centuries in India, particularly the state of West Bengal.

The role of Abalakanto in Ogo Bodhu Sundari has also become legendary.

Dutta played important roles in films like Teen Kanya, Paras Pathar, Kapurush O Mahapurush, Streer Patra, Marjina Abdallah, Jana Aranya, Char Murti and Gana Devata. He played the roles of comedians in some commercial theaters. Kone Bibhrat was one of the plays in his later years which was a mega hit. He worked in a TV serial called Goenda Bhagabandas with Rabi Ghosh, another famous actor of his time.

== Filmography ==
Year	Title	Director	Role	Notes
1958	Parash Pathar	Satyajit Ray	Atanu (the announcer)	Uncredited
1958	Headmaster	Agragami	Actor	
1961	Teen Kanya	Satyajit Ray	Kishori	(segment "Samapti")
1965	Mahapurush	Satyajit Ray	Professor Nandi / Nani	
1968	Goopy Gyne Bagha Byne	Satyajit Ray	King of Shundi & Halla	
1972	Streer Patra	Purnendu Pattrea	Doctor	
1973	Shriman Prithviraj	Tarun Majumdar	Nobin Master	
1973	Marjina Abdulla	Dinen Gupta	Ali Baba	
1974	Sonar Kella	Satyajit Ray	Lalmohan Ganguly / Jatayu	
1974	Jadu Bansha	Partha Prathim Choudhury	Actor	
1976	Jana Aranya	Satyajit Ray	Hiralal Saha	
1976	Asadharan	Salil Sen	Actor	
1977	Sister	Pijush Bose	Actor	
1977	Ek Je Chhilo Desh	Tapan Sinha	Actor	
1977	Ei Prithibir Panthanibas	Aravind Mukherjee	Actor	
1977	Shesh Raksha	Shankar Bhattacharya	Actor	
1978	Charmurti	Umanath Bhattacharya	Meshomoshai	
1979	Joi Baba Felunath	Satyajit Ray	Lalmohan Ganguly / Jatayu	
1979	Ghatkali	Bimal Roy Jr.	Actor	
1979	Ganadevata	Tarun Majumdar	Surveyor	
1979	Brajabuli	Pijush Bose	Actor	
1980	Paka Dekha	Aravind Mukherjee	Actor	
1980	Hirak Rajar Deshe	Satyajit Ray	King of Shundi / scientist in Hirak Raj	
1980	Sandhi	Amal Dutta	Actor	
1980	Abhi	Apurba Kumar Mitra	Actor	
1980	Gopal Bhar	Amal Sur	Gopal Bhar	
1981	Subarnalata	Bijoy Bose	Actor	
1981	Ogo Bodhu Shundori	Salil Dutta	Abolakanta	
1982	Khelar Putul	Tarun Majumdar	Actor	
1982	Malancha	Purnendu Pattrea	Actor	
1982	Rasamoyeer Rasikata	Amal Sur	Actor	
1983	Rajeswari	Salil Dutta	Actor	
1983	Kauke Bolo Na	Vishwanath Mukherjee	Actor	
1983	Duti Pata	Bimal Roy Jr.	Actor	
1983	Srinkhal	Abir Basu	Actor	
1984	Pujarini	Partha Prathim Choudhury	Actor	
1984	Shilalipi	Palash Bannerjee	Actor	
1984	Sorgol	Biswajit	Actor	
1984	Lolita	Tapan Choudhury	Actor	
1984	Amar Geeti	Tarun Majumdar	Actor	
1984	Joy Parajoy	Chandan Mukherjee	Actor	
1985	Baikunther Will	Sushil Mukherjee	Actor	
1985	Nishantay	Narayan Chakraborty	Actor	
1985	Aamar Prithibi	Bimal Bhowmick	Actor	
1985	Nishante	Narayan Chakraborty	Actor	
1985	Hulusthul	Aravind Mukherjee	Actor	
1986	Dui Adhyay	Goutam Mukhopadhyay	Actor	
1986	Urbashe	Salil Dutta	Actor	
1986	Subho Kamon Aachho?	Partha Pratim Chowdhury	Actor	
1987	Abir	Kamal Majumdar	Actor	
1987	Samrat-O-Sundari	Bimal Roy Jr.	Actor	
1988	Agni Sanket	Swarup Dutta	Actor	
1989	Gili Gili Gay	Ishwar Chakraborty	Actor	
1991	Palataka	Saran Dey	Actor	
