= Asutosh College =

Undergraduate college affiliated to the University of Calcutta

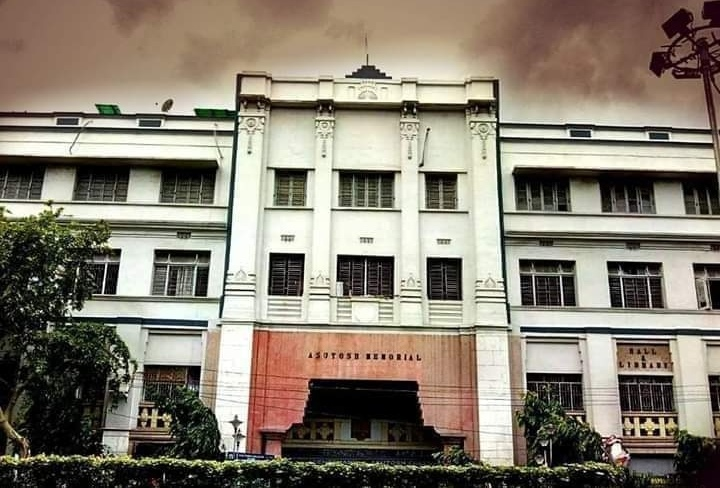
- Front view of Asutosh College main building, Kolkata (old campus at Hazra)
- Former name: South Suburban College (1916–1924)
- Motto: Jnān Jethā Mukta (Bengali)
- Motto in English: Where Knowledge is Free
- Type: Public
- Established: c. 17 July 1916; 110 years ago
- Academic affiliations: University of Calcutta
- President: Saugata Roy
- Principal: Dr. Manas Kabi
- Undergraduates: 5970 (As of 2021–22)
- Postgraduates: 294 (As of 2021–22)
- Location: Kolkata, West Bengal, India; 22°31′31.43″N 88°20′38.10″E
- Campus: Urban
- Website: asutoshcollege.in

Asutosh College, established in 1916, is a premier government aided college in Kolkata and under Calcutta University. It offers undergraduate level courses in various science and art subjects, also postgraduate degrees in select science and arts subjects. This college is situated in Southern Kolkata, close to the Jatin Das Park Metro Station, gate No. 2. It is affiliated to the University of Calcutta.

== History ==
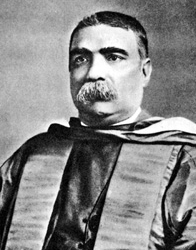
Sir Asutosh Mukherjee

In 1916, This college was established as the South Suburban College, under the stewardship of educationist Sir Ashutosh Mukherjee, who was the then vice-chancellor of the University of Calcutta. The first Governing body of the College was made up of many eminent educationist of the city such as Justice Asutosh Chaudhuri, Babu Dwarkanath Chakravarti, Babu Mahendranath Ray, Babu Biraj Mohan Majumdar, Babu Provas Chunder Mitter, Dr. Girindranath Mukherjee et cetera.

In 1924, after the death of Sir Ashutosh Mukherjee, the college was renamed as Asutosh College.

In the year 2002, a post graduation course in Environmental Science was introduced. Post graduate courses in Applied Geology, Bengali, Computer Science, Information Science, Geography, Zoology were introduced in between 2009 and 2014. In 2013, add-on courses in Hospital waste disposal management, Industrial Chemistry and Travel & Tourism were introduced.

In 2012, the Mother Teresa International Award was conferred on Asutosh College for outstanding achievement and contribution in the field of Best College of the Year.

In 2014, University Grants Commission-approved free add-on courses on Tourism, Industrial Chemistry, and Hospital Waste Disposal Management were introduced by the college.

== Campuses ==
A Second Campus of Asutosh College was planned in 2003. The Centenary Building of the college was inaugurated by the erstwhile President of India, Pranab Mukherjee on 1 April 2015. Asutosh college is the 12th college in Kolkata that was first to set up rooftop solar plant to produce 20 kW for its own use.

== Departments and courses ==
The college offers different undergraduate and postgraduate courses and aims at imparting education to the undergraduates and postgraduates of upper-, lower- and middle-class people of Kolkata and its adjoining areas.

=== Science ===
Science faculty consists of the departments of Chemistry, Physics, Mathematics, Statistics, Computer Science & Application, Biochemistry, Geography, Geology, Applied Geology, Botany, Zoology, Physiology, Microbiology, Psychology, Environmental Science, Industrial Fish & Fisheries, Electronics, and Economics.

=== Arts & Commerce ===
Arts and Commerce faculty consists of departments of Bengali, English, Communicative English, Sanskrit, Hindi, History, Geography, Political Science, Philosophy, Journalism & Mass Communication, Sociology, and Commerce.

== Accreditation ==
Asutosh College are recognized by the University Grants Commission (UGC).

In 2015, the Government of West Bengal offered a financial incentive of up to Rs. 2 crore each, to colleges with NAAC grading of A or B. The Department of Higher Education wanted institutions like Asutosh College with a proven academic track record of renewing their NAAC grade. But many colleges, including Asutosh, was reluctant to get involved in the process which the Principal at the time called "long drawn and fund consuming, without having any real benefit".The first college in West Bengal to be accredited by the National Assessment and Accreditation Council in 2002, it was given an A grade with a CGPA score of 3.22 in 2016, helping it secure its position among the top four affiliated colleges of West Bengal.

Consistently ranked among Kolkata's top colleges. In 2016, the college secured 2nd position in Kolkata in Science category of India Today ranking. Now this college is considered most premier affiliated college under Calcutta University.

== Facilities ==
The college has a counselling cell for victims of ragging as well as possible aggressors, as part of an anti-ragging initiative.

== Female students ==
In 1996, then Principal Subhankar Chakraborty was accused of moral policing after he asked female students to dress modestly.

In 2018, sanitary pad dispensers, installed in the college in 2015 were found to be not working. Many female students did not know about the machines while others felt self-conscious about using the machines, which in corridors and other public parts of the campus. However, the college said the quality of pads were so low that students gave them a miss, and that the services of the company roped in by the state government to install and operate the machines were unpredictable and bad.

== Notable alumni ==
- Bappaditya Bandopadhyay, Filmmmker
- Sunil Chhetri
- Amitabha Chowdhury
- Usha Ranjan Ghatak
- Abu Hasem Khan Choudhury
- Tripti Mitra
- Rabi Ghosh
- Mahasweta Devi
- Anup Ghoshal
- Neel Dutt
- Dinesh Das
- Ditipriya Roy, Actress
- Ushasi Ray, Actress
- Mimi Chakraborty, Actress
- Charu Chandra Bhandari
- Dipsita Dhar
- Pathikrit Basu, Filmmmker
- Ritabrata Banerjee
- Shantilal Mukherjee, Actor
- Srijato, Poet & Lyricist
- Mokksha, Actress
- Vina Mazumdar, academic and feminist

== Notable faculty ==
- Somlata Acharyya Chowdhury

== See also ==
- Jogamaya Devi College
- Syamaprasad College
- University of Calcutta
