= Amar Pal =

Indian Bengali folk singer and author (1922–2019)

- Born: 19 May 1922; Brahmanbaria, Bengal Presidency, British India (now Bangladesh)
- Died: 20 April 2019 (aged 96); Kolkata, West Bengal

Amar Pal (19 May 1922 – 20 April 2019) was an Indian Bengali folk singer and author.

== Early life ==
Pal was born in 1922 at Brahmanbaria in British India. His father Mahesh Chandra Pal died when Pal was 10. He learned folk songs from his mother Durga Sundari Devi. He also trained in classical music from Ustad Ayat Ali Khan, brother of legendary Allauddin Khan. Later Pal received training in folk music from Mani Chakraborty and Suren Chakraborty in Kolkata.

== Career ==
Pal went to Kolkata in 1948 with Sachindranath Bhattacharya, a lyricist of All India Radio. In 1951, he first got a chance to sing in Akashbani Kolkata. He recorded thousands of folk and modern Bengali songs in the next seven decades. The satirical song "Kotoi Rongo Dekhi Duniyay", in Satyajit Ray's Hirak Rajar Deshe, made him famous. He worked in a number of Bengali films as a playback singer or music director.

Pal attended seminars and workshops on folk music worldwide and became the vice-chairman of the Paschim Banga Rajya Sangeet Academy.

He received the Sangeet Natak Akademi Award in 2007 from the Government of India and the Government of West Bengal awarded him the Sangeet Mahasamman in 2012 for his prolonged contribution in folk music. He was honoured by the Rabindra Bharati University and Burdwan University.

Pal also wrote two books, Banglar Loksangeet and Banglaar Nadir Gaan.

The notable devotional songs Pal sang are as follows:

- Prabhata Samaye
- Jago He Nagarbasi
- Jagia Laho Krishna Nam
- Ami Kothay Gele
- Amar Gour Kene
- Rai Jago
- Rai Jago Go
- Hari Din Toh Gelo
- Prabhate Gouranga Nam
- Bharati Gouranga Loiya
- Mon Radhe Radhe
- Vrindabana Bilasini, etc.

== Death ==
Pal died at SSKM Hospital, Kolkata after a cardiac arrest on 20 April 2019 at the age of 96.
