= Jogamaya Devi College =

Women's College

- Motto: आत्मदीपो भव (Sanskrit)
- Motto in English: Be your own light
- Type: Undergraduate women's college
- Established: 1932; 94 years ago
- Academic affiliations: University of Calcutta
- President: Dr. Manotosh Dasgupta
- Principal: Dr. Srabani Sarkar
- Location: 92, Shyamaprasad Mukherjee Road, Kolkata, West Bengal, 700 026, India; 22.5252°N 88.3438°E
- Website: jogamayadevicollege.ac.in
- Location within Kolkata Location within India

Jogamaya Devi College is one of the oldest and leading women's colleges in Kolkata, India. It shares the same building with Asutosh College (day college) and Syamaprasad College (evening college) and is named after the wife of Sir Asutosh Mukherjee. It is a National Assessment and Accreditation Council (NAAC) accredited Grade "B" college. It offers undergraduate and postgraduate degrees and is affiliated to the University of Calcutta. It was established in 1932.

== Notable alumni ==
- Suchitra Bhattacharya, writer
- Mamata Banerjee, 8th Chief Minister of West Bengal
- Locket Chatterjee, actress, former Member of Lok Sabha
- Satabdi Roy, actress, Member of Lok Sabha
- Bijoya Ray, actress
- Ananya Chatterjee, National Award Winner Actress
- Soumili Biswas, actress
- Kaushiki Chakraborty, Playback singer

== See also ==
- Asutosh College
- List of colleges affiliated to the University of Calcutta
