= Shakchunni =

Bengali female ghost

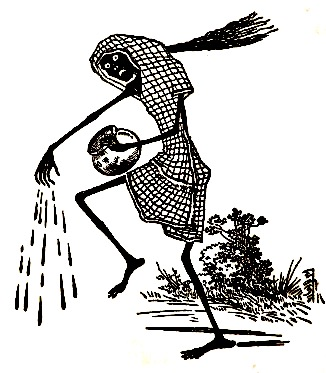
Depiction of a Shakchunni spreading cow dung mixed water

Shakchunni (Bengali: শাকচুন্নি ; also sometimes spelled Shankhachunni) is a female ghost in Bengali folklore, commonly described in the mythological traditions of Bangladesh and the Indian state of West Bengal. The term refers to the spirit of a married Hindu woman who died while still married (i.e., before her husband).

== Etymology ==
The word Shakchunni is derived from the Sanskrit term Shankhachurni. In Bengali Hindu tradition, married women traditionally wear conch-shell bangles (shankha) and vermilion (sindoor) as symbols of marriage. The Shakchunni is believed to retain these symbols even after death, reflecting her continued attachment to married life.

== Origin and folklore ==
According to folklore, a Shakchunni is the spirit of a married woman whose desires and attachments to domestic life remain unfulfilled at the time of her death. She is often portrayed as longing for marital happiness and household life, and is said to possess or influence married women, especially those from affluent households, in order to relive such experiences.

Stories featuring Shakchunni appear in traditional Bengali folktales, including those found in collections such as Thakurmar Jhuli. In many narratives, an exorcist (ojha) ultimately defeats or expels her spirit.

== Physical description ==
Shakchunnis are typically described as having greenish skin, resembling the color of leafy vegetables (shaak). Like many spirits in Bengali folklore, they are portrayed as thin and emaciated. They wear traditional red-and-white saris associated with married Bengali women, along with conch bangles and red vermilion on their foreheads. Despite being ghosts, they are often depicted as conscious of their appearance and adornment.

== Characteristics ==
Shakchunnis are often described as fond of fish, a culturally significant food for married women in Bengal. In traditional belief, married women were encouraged to consume fish as a symbol of their husband's well-being and longevity. The Shakchunni’s craving for fish symbolizes her desire to return to married life. Folklore varies regarding whether she prefers raw, fried, burnt, or even rotten fish.

They are also believed to sprinkle cow-dung water in their dwelling areas and are said to inhabit certain trees, particularly Streblus asper (sheora) and mango trees.

== See also ==
- Ghosts in Bengali Culture
- Petni
- Pishachas
- Aleya Bhoot
- Thakumar Jhuli
