= Ek Je Chhilo Desh =

1977 Bengali film

Ek Je Chhilo Desh (Once There Was a Country) is a Bengali romantic comedy film directed by Tapan Sinha based on the story of Sankar. The film was released on 29 July 1977 under the banner of K. L. Kapoor Distributors.

== Plot ==
An eccentric but brilliant scientist accidentally discovers a truth serum, and who drinks it start to tell the absolute truth. He uses it upon corrupt and dishonest persons. These people publicly confess all of their scam and corruption. This creates a massive chaotic situations.

== Cast ==
- Dipankar De as Scientist
- Sumitra Mukherjee
- Anil Chatterjee
- Rabi Ghosh
- Bhanu Bandyopadhyay
- Chhaya Devi
- Jahor Roy
- Santosh Dutta
- Kanu Banerjee
- Gita Dey
- Anup Kumar
- Haridhan Mukherjee
- Prema Narayan
- Kalyan Chatterjee

== External link ==
- Ek Je Chhilo Desh at IMDb
