= Goopi Gawaiya Bagha Bajaiya =

- Official film poster
- Directed by: Shilpa Ranade
- Screenplay by: Soumitra Ranade; Rohit Gohlowt
- Story by: Upendra Kishore Roychowdhury
- Based on: Goopy Gyne Bagha Byne by Upendrakishore Ray Chowdhury
- Starring: Manish Bhawan; Shailendra Pande; Rajeev Raj
- Edited by: Avinash Walzde
- Music by: 3 Brothers and a Violin
- Production companies: Paperboat Animation Studios; Children's Film Society; Karadi Tales
- Distributed by: Children's Film Society
- Release dates: 7 September 2013 (Toronto); 1 March 2019 (India)
- Running time: 79 minutes
- Country: India
- Language: Hindi
- Budget: ₹2 crore

Goopi Gawaiya Bagha Bajaiya is a 2013 Indian animated film directed by Shilpa Ranade. It is based on the characters Goopy and Bagha created by Satyajit Ray's grandfather Upendra Kishore Roychowdhury.

== Premise ==
Two blundering yet lovable musician protagonists meet ghosts, obtain boons, avert wars, marry princesses and help the common people live happily ever after.

== Cast ==
- Manish Bhawan as Bagha
- Rajeev Raj as Goopi
- Shailendra Pande as Ghost King
- Shahanawaz Pradhan
- Vishal Kumar as Ladoo
- Aditya Sharma

== Release ==
The film had its world premiere at the Toronto International Film Festival on 7 September 2013. The film was also screened at 11th Mumbai International Film Festival on 17 October the same year.

== Reception ==
Namrata Joshi of The Hindu wrote, "The look is mint fresh and distinctly 'Indian', so is the lingo and the music. The bright animation, colourful props, puppet-like human figures and the rich production design with abundant use of our textiles, is gorgeous artwork in itself. The film is enchanting not just for the children but can hold an adult in thrall." Shubhra Gupta of The Indian Express gave the 3 out of 5, calling production design "remarkable" and music, "superb."

The soundtrack for the film received positive reviews.

== Awards and nominations ==
Year	Name of competition	Category	Result	Recipient
2013	2013 Asia Pacific Screen Awards	Best Animated Feature Film	Nominated	Children's Film Society India
2014	FICCI BAF Awards	Best Indian Animated Feature Film (Theatrical Release)	Won	Children's Film Society, Paperboat Animation Studios

== See also ==
- Goopy Gyne Bagha Byne (film series)
- List of indian animated feature films
