= Agantuk =

- Poster
- Directed by: Satyajit Ray
- Screenplay by: Satyajit Ray
- Based on: Atithi (short story) by Satyajit Ray
- Produced by: Satyajit Ray
- Starring: Utpal Dutt; Mamata Shankar; Deepankar De; Dhritiman Chatterjee; Promod Ganguli; Rabi Ghosh
- Cinematography: Barun Raha
- Edited by: Dulal Dutta
- Music by: Satyajit Ray
- Production companies: NFDC; DD Productions
- Distributed by: Artificial Eye (UK)
- Release dates: 1991 (India); 22 May 1992 (US); 19 November 1993 (UK)
- Running time: 120 minutes
- Countries: India; France
- Language: Bengali

Agantuk (lit. 'Guest'; known by its English title The Stranger) is a 1991 Bengali-language drama film written and directed by Satyajit Ray. Notable for being Ray's last film, it was based on one of his short stories, Atithi. A joint Indo-French production, it received financial backing from companies such as Gérard Depardieu's DD Productions and Canal+.

== Plot summary ==
Anila Bose, who lives in Calcutta, receives a letter from someone claiming to be her long lost uncle, Manomohan Mitra. He writes that he is visiting India after spending 35 years abroad and, as Anila is his only surviving relative, wants to meet her before he sets off again. Anila looks forward to meeting him, but her husband, Sudhindra, is suspicious. The uncle arrives and stays with them. He says that he is an anthropologist who has traveled all over the world, and immediately wins the friendship of their pre-teen son, Satyaki.

Anila suddenly remembers her grandfather's will, and Sudhindra is quick to suspect that the man calling himself Manomohan has come only to claim his share of the inheritance. Anila also starts to doubt his identity, while their son truly believes that he is who he claims to be.

The central conflict of the film rests upon the identity of the man and the family's struggle to determine it. Sudhindra subjects the visitor to various tests, such as looking at his passport. However, the visitor embarrasses Sudhindra and later his friend Rakshit by his ability to read minds. In a final attempt to establish the truth, Sudhindra invites a lawyer friend to gently question the guest. This is when the visitor reveals his deep knowledge, rich experiences and profound views of life, impressing Anila and Sudhindra. However, things turn ugly as the lawyer's frustration builds up until he orders the guest to "either come clean or just clear out". The next morning, the visitor is gone. Desperate to find him and win him back, the family finally learns that he is in fact Manmohan Mitra, and has visited the executor of the will. The couple apologise and persuade him to return. Back in Calcutta, after he leaves for Australia, the couple learn that Manmohan has given them his share of the inheritance.

== Cast ==
- Utpal Dutt ... Manomohan Mitra / The Agantuk
- Deepankar De ... Sudhindra Bose
- Mamata Shankar ... Anila Bose
- Bikram Bhattacharya ... Satyaki Bose
- Dhritiman Chatterjee ... Prithwish Sen Gupta
- Rabi Ghosh ... Ranjan Rakshit
- Subrata Chatterjee ... Chhanda Rakshit
- Promode Ganguly ... Tridib Mukherjee
- Ajit Bandyopadhyay ... Sital Sarkar

== Production ==
Agantuk is Satyajit Ray's last film. He died on 23 April 1992, at the age of 70. The film was a joint Indian-French production with financial backing from Gérard Depardieu's DD Productions, Canal+ and a couple of other French companies. Depardieu is credited as executive producer.

== Reception ==
The film was critically acclaimed upon its release. The film ranked 2nd on Cahiers du Cinéma's Top 10 Films of the Year List in 1992. Leah Garchik of San Francisco Chronicle wrote the film "is a fitting ending to Ray's 30-film career — it was Film of the Year in India in 1992 — a strong and underlined summing- up statement about capital-M Man and capital-C Civilization." Hal Hinson of Washington Post wrote the film "shows all the virtues of a master artist in full maturity." Vincent Canby of New York Times wrote about the film "A small, gentle, exquisitely realized comedy about, among other things, family loyalties and trust in a world in which traditions have been devalued."

== Awards ==
At the 1992 Indian National Film Awards, Agantuk won the awards for Best Feature Film and Best Directing, and the Special Jury Award went to Mamata Shankar for her portrayal of Anila. At the Ritwik Ghatak awards, it was named the Best Film, while Ray was named the Best Scenario Writer.

== Sequel ==
A stand-alone sequel named Agantuker Pore was supposed to be in production, but has been shelved. Mamata Shankar, Deepankar De and Dhritiman Chatterjee were to reprise their roles from this film. Actor Abir Chatterjee was to play the role of the adult Satyaki. Payel Sarkar and Tridha Chowdhury were to be seen in important roles. It was supposed to be directed by Orko Sinha, who said the story would be completely different from the previous film.
