= Hirak Rajar Deshe =

1980 Indian film by Satyajit Ray

Hirak Rajar Deshe (In the Kingdom of Diamonds)
- Theatrical release poster
- Directed by: Satyajit Ray
- Written by: Satyajit Ray
- Produced by: Government of West Bengal
- Starring: Tapen Chatterjee; Rabi Ghosh; Utpal Dutt; Soumitra Chatterjee; Santosh Dutta; Haradhan Banerjee; Promod Ganguli; Ajoy Banerjee; Kartik Chatterjee; Haridhan Mukherjee
- Cinematography: Soumendu Roy
- Edited by: Dulal Dutta
- Music by: Satyajit Ray
- Release date: 19 December 1980
- Running time: 118 mins
- Country: India
- Language: Bengali

Hirak Rajar Deshe (lit. 'In the country of the Diamond-King'; English title: "Kingdom of Diamonds") is a 1980 Indian Bengali-language epic satirical film and a sequel to the 1969 anti-war fantasy musical Goopy Gyne Bagha Byne (and the second installment of Goopy Gyne Bagha Byne series) directed by Satyajit Ray. In the film, the musicians Goopy and Bagha (who received magical powers in the first film) travel to the kingdom of the Diamond King, to find a sinister plot at work – subjects are being brainwashed by rewriting their thoughts with rhyming slogans.

== Plot ==
The magically musical duo of Goopy Gyne and Bagha Byne make a comeback in this sequel, where they are invited to the court of the Hirak Raja (The Diamond King, Bangla: হীরক রাজা) for their musical skills. They are to perform at the kingdom's anniversary celebrations.

Goopy and Bagha are bored with their lives as crown princes of Shundi and Halla. They are looking for an adventure, which comes in the form of a chance to visit Hirak (Land of Diamonds), known for its huge diamond mines. They happily set out for the kingdom, dressed as commoners, unaware of the machinations of the King of Hirak (Utpal Dutt), who is a tyrant. Diamonds and riches get pent up in his treasuries, while his subjects starve and suffer. Those who protest are taken care of in the 'Jantarmantar'(যন্তর মন্তর), a chamber for brainwashing (মগজ ধোলাই) devised by the scientist (Santosh Dutta), who the king mocks calling as "Gobeshok Gobochondro Gyanotirtho Gyanorotno Gyanambudhi Gyanochuramoni"(গবেষক গবুচন্দ্র জ্ঞানতীর্থ জ্ঞানরত্ন জ্ঞানম্বোধী জ্ঞানচূড়ামণি) His ministers are mere puppets. The only enemy, the king, has in his land is Udayan Pandit (Soumitra Chatterjee). He is a school teacher and, more than that, he is a believer of values. The king sees him as a threat to his kingdom's new generation and forcefully closes his school down and tries to burn down books, and he flees to hide in the mountains after attacking soldiers who were trying to burn books.

Meanwhile, Goopy and Bagha are on their way to Hirak. By coincidence, they meet Udayan hiding in a cave, who informs them of the king's true nature. The two impress Udayan with their magical powers, who makes plans to use them against the tyrant. Goopy and Bagha agree. The duo then heads into Hirak, where they are welcomed with grandeur. They entertain the tyrant king, fooling him into believing that they think he is great. They request him to show them his impressive diamond mine, where Udayan, disguised as a miner, plant a note in Bagha's shoe while bowing to them. While the inauguration of the large statue of the king, they check the note which is meet him in the jungle at night. While signalling to the duo, Udayan's signal is also seen by the king, who sends soldiers to catch him. They rob the treasury of the king according to the plan of Udayan (which was guarded by a tiger) using their magical music, to get diamonds for bribing the guards.

The king has his tricks, too. He also captures Udayan's students and takes them to the Jantarmantar for brainwashing. But Goopy and Bagha have already reached there using their magical powers. They have also bribed the Gobeshok onto their side, with the guards. On reaching the laboratory, the king and his ministers are stunned magically by Goopy's singing and then pushed into the Brainwashing machine. After the king is brainwashed, he turns to the good side, he then, along with the villagers, pulls down his own statue situated at the center of the village, and everything goes back to normal in the land of Hirak.

== Crew ==
- Producer: Government of West Bengal
- Director: Satyajit Ray
- Editor: Dulal Datta
- Art Direction: Ashoke Bose
- Sound: Robin Sen Gupta, Durgadas Mitra

== Cast ==
Character	Actor(s)
Goopy Gyne	Tapen Chatterjee
Bagha Byne	Rabi Ghosh
Hirak Raja	Utpal Dutt
Udayan Pandit	Soumitra Chatterjee
Shundi'r Raja	Santosh Dutta
Gobeshok (Scientist)	Santosh Dutta
Prohori (Sentry)	Kamu Mukherjee
Udayan's Father	Promod Ganguli
Udayan's Mother	Alpana Gupta
Charandas	Rabin Majumdar
Fazal Mian	Sunil Sarkar
Balaram	Nani Ganguli
Bidushak	Ajoy Banerjee
Sobhakobi (Court Poet)	Kartik Chatterjee
Raj Jyotishi (Court Astrologer)	Haridhan Mukherjee
Ministers	Bimal Deb; Tarun Mitra; Gopal Dey; Sailen Ganguli; Samir Mukherjee

== Awards ==
Year	Award	Awardee
1980	National Film Award for Best Male Playback Singer	Anup Ghoshal
1980	National Film Award for Best Music Direction	Satyajit Ray
1980	National Film Award for Best Feature Film in Bengali	Satyajit Ray
1984	Cyprus International Film Festival - Special Award	Satyajit Ray

== Songs ==
All the songs were composed and penned by Satyajit Ray. He prominently used Anup Ghoshal as a voice of Goopy. Most of the songs were sung by Anup Ghoshal except one ("Kotoi Rongo Dekhi Duniay") sung by Amar Pal.

The soundtrack won two National Film Awards. Satyajit Ray won the award for the Best Music Direction. Anup Ghoshal won the Best Male Playback Singer Award.

Track	Title	Singer	Duration
01	"Mora Dujonai Rajar Jamai"	Anup Ghoshal	05:09
02	"Aar Bilombo Noy"	Anup Ghoshal	02:15
03	"Kotoi Rongo Dekhi Duniay"	Amar Pal	01:46
04	"Aaha ki Anondo Akashe Batashe"	Anup Ghoshal	02:54
05	"Aha Shagore Dekho Chaye"	Anup Ghoshal	01:40
06	"Eje Drishyo Dekhi Anyo"	Anup Ghoshal	01:32
07	"Ebare Dekho Gorbito Bir"	Anup Ghoshal	01:09
08	"Eshe Hirok Deshe"	Anup Ghoshal	02:55
09	"Dhoronako Shantrimoshai"	Anup Ghoshal	01:41
10	"Paaye Podi Baghmama"	Anup Ghoshal	03:21
11	"Nohi Jontro"	Anup Ghoshal	04:26
12	"Mora Goopy Bagha Dujon Bhayra Bhai"	Anup Ghoshal	01:19

== Background score ==
Track	Title	Duration
01	"King Arrives"	00:28
02	"Ministers Get Necklace"	01:12
03	"Entry of Scientist"	
04	"The Brain-Washing Machine"	01:32
05	"The Reciting Of Mantras"	
06	"Udayan Advises His Students"	01:14
07	"Burning The Books"	
08	"Hiding The Distressed"	00:51
09	"At The Kingdom Of Hirak"	01:48
10	"Rings For The Kings"	00:46
11	"Statue Inauguration"	01:17
12	"Inside Diamond Mine"	00:36
13	"To Find Udayan"	02:10
14	"In The Secret Room"	02:58

== Sequels ==
=== Goopy Bagha Phire Elo ===
Sandip Ray, son of director Satyajit Ray directed another sequel named Goopy Bagha Phire Elo. The film was released twelve years after the release of Hirak Rajar Deshe.

=== Future ===
Sandip Ray wants to make another sequel to this series. He had received many requests to make the fourth Goopy - Bagha movie. Ray said to The Times of India about the plot of the fourth film: "Making a Goopy Bagha movie without Tapen and Rabi is unthinkable. The only way I can do a fourth is by taking the story forward and introducing Goopy and Bagha's sons". The idea to weave a story around the next generation came from a line from the introductory song "Mora dujonai rajar jamai in 'Hirak Rajar Deshe" — "aar ache polapan, ek khan ek khan... (we have one child each)".

== See also ==
- Joychandi Pahar
