= Sasti =

- Location in Maharashtra, India
- Coordinates: 19.8392°N 79.3273°E
- Country: India
- State: Maharashtra
- District: Chandrapur

Population (2011)
  - Total: 4,320

Languages
  - Official: Marathi
- Time zone: UTC+5:30 (IST)
- Postal code: 442905

Sasti is a census town in Chandrapur district in the Indian state of Maharashtra.

== Geography ==
Sasti is situated only a few miles from the Wardha River.

== Demographics ==
As of the 2011 Census of India, Sasti has a population of 4,320. Males constitute 52% of the population and females make up 47%. Sasti has an average literacy rate of 81.43%, lower than the state average of 82.34%. Male literacy is 88.82%, and female literacy is 73.23%. In Sasti, 11.76% of the population are under 6 years of age.

Year	Male	Female	Total Population	Change	Religion (%)							
Year	Male	Female	Total Population	Change	Hindu	Muslim	Christian	Sikhs	Buddhist	Jain	Other religions and persuasions	Religion not stated
2001	2887	2571	5458	-	87.175	2.986	0.641	0.238	8.630	0.055	0.000	0.275
2011	2251	2069	4320	-0.209	87.593	3.079	0.417	0.023	8.819	0.046	0.000	0.023

== Work Profile ==
Out of the total population, 1,720, or 39.81%, are engaged in work or business activity. Of this portion, 1,266 (29.31%) are male while 454 (10.51%) are female. In the census survey, "worker" is defined as a person who does business or has a job in service, agriculture, or labor. Of the total working population, 87.38% were engaged in Main Work while 12.62% of total workers were engaged in Marginal Work
