= Ajit Bandyopadhyay (actor) =

Indian actor

Ajit Bandyopadhyay (27 September 1911 – 3 December 2004) (alternative spelling Ajit Bandopadhyay or Ajit Banerjee) was a Bengali film and theater actor, director, art director.

== Career ==
Ajit Bandopadhyay was born to Ashutosh Badopadyay on 27 September 1911 at Panihati now in North 24 Parganas district in West Bengal during British Rule. His family was permanently settled at Manicktala in Calcutta (presently Kolkata). Ajit studied upto I.Sc. and took a job of a Stenographer in a Gramophone Company.

== Filmography ==
=== Actor ===
- 1950 Michael Madhusudhan (as Ajit Bannerjee)
- 1950 Sheshbesh (as Ajit Bannerjee)
- 1951 Niyoti
- 1951 Pandit Mashai Brindaban (as Ajit Bannerjee)
- 1952 Bindur Chheley - Madhab
- 1952 Nagarik (as Sagar)
- 1954 Maraner Pare: Dr. Paresh Banerjee
- 1956 Asabarna
- 1957 Khela Bhangar Khela
- 1958 Maa Shitala (as Ajit Bannerjee)
- 1959 Neel Akasher Neechey (as Ajit Bandyopadhyay)
- 1962 Bhagini Nivedita
- 1962 The Expedition
- 1963 Uttar Falguni
- 1971 Prothom Kdam Phool
- 1971 Nimantran (as Ajit Bandopadhyay)
- 1975 Chorus (as Asit Bannerjee)
- 1977 Mrigayaa
- 1985 Till Theke Tal
- 1987 Lalan Fakir
- 1989 Sati (as Ajit Bandyopadhyay)
- 1990 Shakha Proshakha: Ananda Majumdar (as Ajit Bandyopadhyay)
- 1991 Agantuk: Sital Sarkar (as Ajit Bandyopadhyay)
- 1992 Indrajit
- 1992 Goopy Bagha Phire Elo: Brahmananda Acharya
- 1996 Baksho Rahashya: Uncle Sidhu (as Ajit Bandyopadhyay)
- 1996 Damu

=== Director ===
- 1970 Ae Korechho Bhalo.
- 1979 Ami Ratan.
- 1987 Radharani.

=== Art director ===
- 1961 Mem-Didi
- 1961 Anuradha
- 1962 Asli-Naqli
- 1966 Anupama
- 1967 Majhli Didi
- 1968 Anokhi Raat
- 1968 Aashirwad
- 1969 Satyakam.
- 1971 Mere Apne.
- 1971 Guddi.

== Awards ==
- 1969 Best Art Director - Black and White for Majhli Didi (1967).
- 1970 Best Art Director - Black and White for Anokhi Raat (1968).

== Death ==
He died at a city nursing home on 3 December 2004 after a protracted illness. According to sources, he was 94.

== See also ==
- Utpal Dutt
