= Shakha Proshakha =

1990 Indian film

- Directed by: Satyajit Ray
- Written by: Satyajit Ray
- Produced by: Satyajit Ray Productions; Gérard Depardieu (D. D. Productions); Daniel Toscan Du Plantier (Erato Films) and Soprofilms
- Starring: Ajit Banerjee; Haradhan Bannerjee; Deepankar Dey; Soumitra Chatterjee; Ranjit Mallick; Soham Chakraborty; Lily Chakravarty; Mamata Shankar
- Cinematography: Barun Raha
- Edited by: Dulal Dutta
- Music by: Satyajit Ray; Bach; Beethoven.
- Release date: 23 November 1990
- Running time: 130 min.
- Country: India
- Language: Bengali

Shakha Proshakha (English: Branches of the Tree) is a 1990 film directed by Satyajit Ray. It deals with four generations of a well-to-do Bengali family, with a focus on the third generation. This film displays an extraordinary use of Gregorian Chant and legendary orchestras of Bach and Beethoven.

== Plot ==
Anandamohan Majumdar, a wealthy, retired industrialist, lives with his 93-year-old father Abhay Charan, and his second son Proshanto. Proshanto, who was once a promising mineralogist, was rendered mentally ill because of a motor accident in England after which he had to leave his job. In a few months after he had returned to India, he spends his time listening to music. However, his memories are still intact though they remain buried in him and only occasionally emerge in his mind, the reason being his mental instability. On the other hand, Abhay Charan used to be a successful English teacher in a school of Hazaribagh (from where Ananda passed out), but with age had slowly forgotten about past events and now lives the life of a senile man, being in the constant care of Ramdohin, one of the family servants.

On his 70th birthday, Ananda suddenly falls ill during a ceremony in his honor. His other three sons who live away rush immediately to his bedside.

The eldest son Probodh is a high-ranking officer in a company and the third son Probir is a businessman. They live corrupt lives and do not want their father, an uncompromising moralist who believes in work and honesty, to find out. It is also revealed that they are indifferent towards their grandfather Abhay Charan, due to their intolerance towards senility. The youngest of the four, Protap, weary of office life and corruption, has left his job and joins a professional theatre company to be away from corruption. During the family meals, tensions are accentuated. Dingo, Probir's only son, learns about the corrupt ways of his father and uncle. Waiting for resolution of their father's health crisis, the four brothers and their families reminisce and relive ideological differences.

One day, all of them except Proshanto go for a picnic. There Protap informs everyone that he left his job as he was not able to tolerate the corrupt practices of the officers. On the last day, Dingo goes to see his grandfather and unknowingly reveals to him about the dishonesty of his father and eldest uncle. This conversation is also heard by Proshanto. Then the families, unaware that their father now know about their corrupt ways, came to bid goodbye to Ananda. After their departure, Ananda feels heartbroken knowing that two of his children are dishonest. Proshanto comes to meet his father and his father reveals to him that he is now everything to him.

== Cast ==
Character	Relation	Performer
Anandamohan Majumdar	Father	Ajit Banerjee
Probodh Majumdar	Eldest son	Haradhan Banerjee
Proshanto Majumdar	Second son	Soumitra Chatterjee
Probir Majumdar	Third son	Deepankar Dey
Protap Majumdar	Fourth son	Ranjit Mallick
Uma	Probodh's wife	Lily Chakravarty
Tapti	Probir's wife	Mamata Shankar
Dipayan "Dingo" Majumdar	Grandson	Soham Chakraborty
Abhay Charan Majumdar	Ananda's Father	Promod Ganguli
Reporter	-	Pradip Mukherjee

== Other credits ==
Producer	Satyajit Ray Productions, Gérard Depardieu (D. D. Productions), Daniel Toscan Du Plantier (Erato Films) and Soprofilms
Original Screenplay & Direction	Satyajit Ray
Cinematography	Barun Raha
Editing	Dulal Dutta
Art Direction	Ashoke Bose
Sound	Pierre Lenoir, Sujit Sarkar, Jyoti Chatterjee
Music	Satyajit Ray, Bach - Suite No.2 in B minor, BWV 1067: V. Polonaise, Beethoven - String Quartet No. 7 (Beethoven) : II. Allegretto vivace e sempre scherzando, Gregorian Chant - Vêpres de la Trinité - Antienne: Te Deum - Magnificat solennel - Kyrie - Pater - Oraison
