= Sandip Ray =

Indian film director and music composer (born 1953)

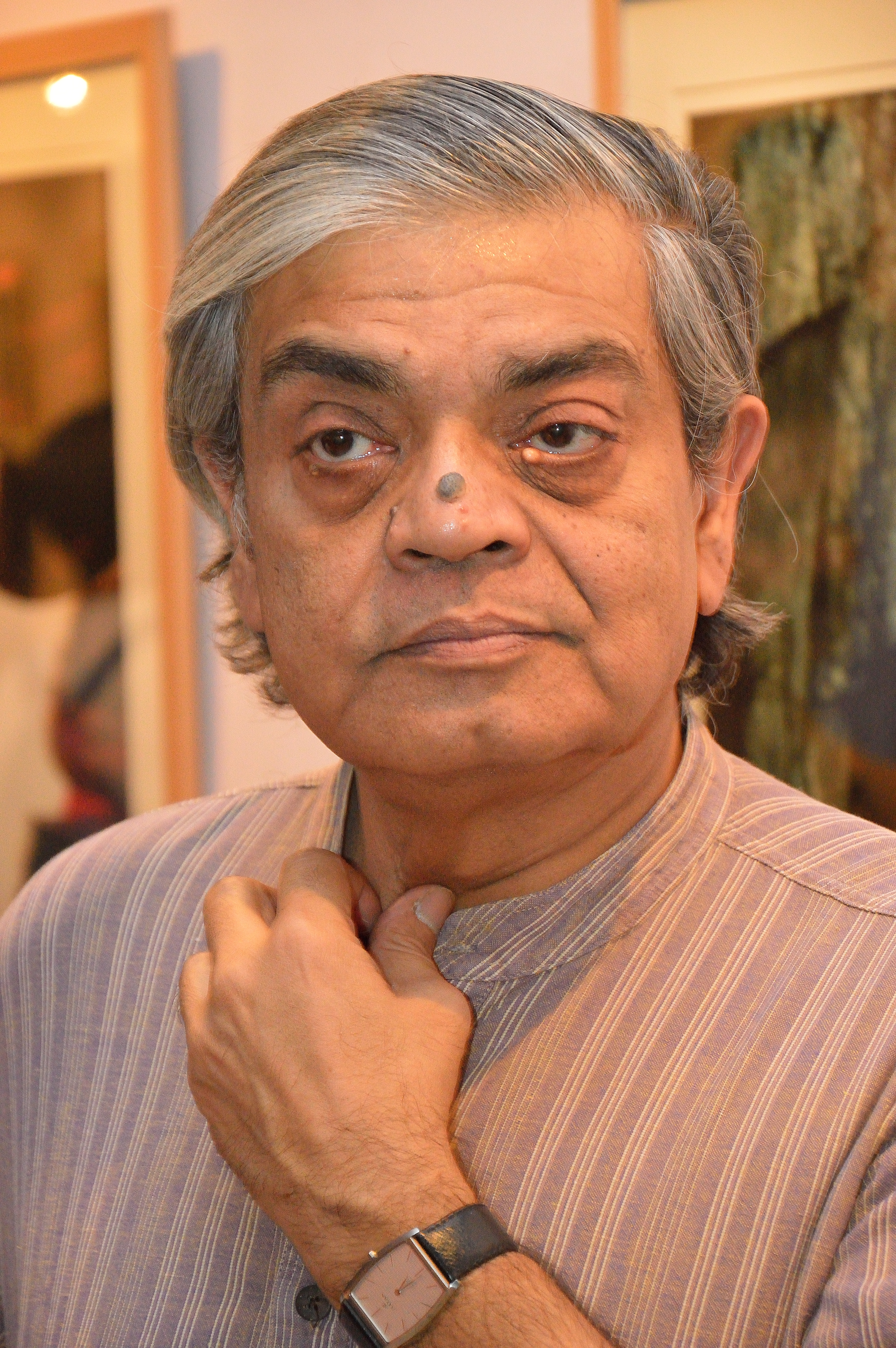
- Ray in 2014
- Born: 8 September 1953 (age 73); Calcutta (presently Kolkata), West Bengal, India
- Occupations: Film director, composer and music director
- Years active: 1976–present
- Height: 5 ft 10 in (178 cm)
- Spouse: Lalita Ray
- Children: Souradeep Ray
- Parent(s): Satyajit Ray (father); Bijoya Ray (mother)

Sandip Ray (born 8 September 1953) is an Indian film director and music director who mainly works in Bengali cinema. He is the only child of the famous Indian director Satyajit Ray and Bijoya Ray.

== Life and education ==
Sandip Ray was born in Calcutta. Initially schooled at the South Point School and after it, the Patha Bhavan, Kolkata, he subsequently attended the University of Calcutta.

== Career ==
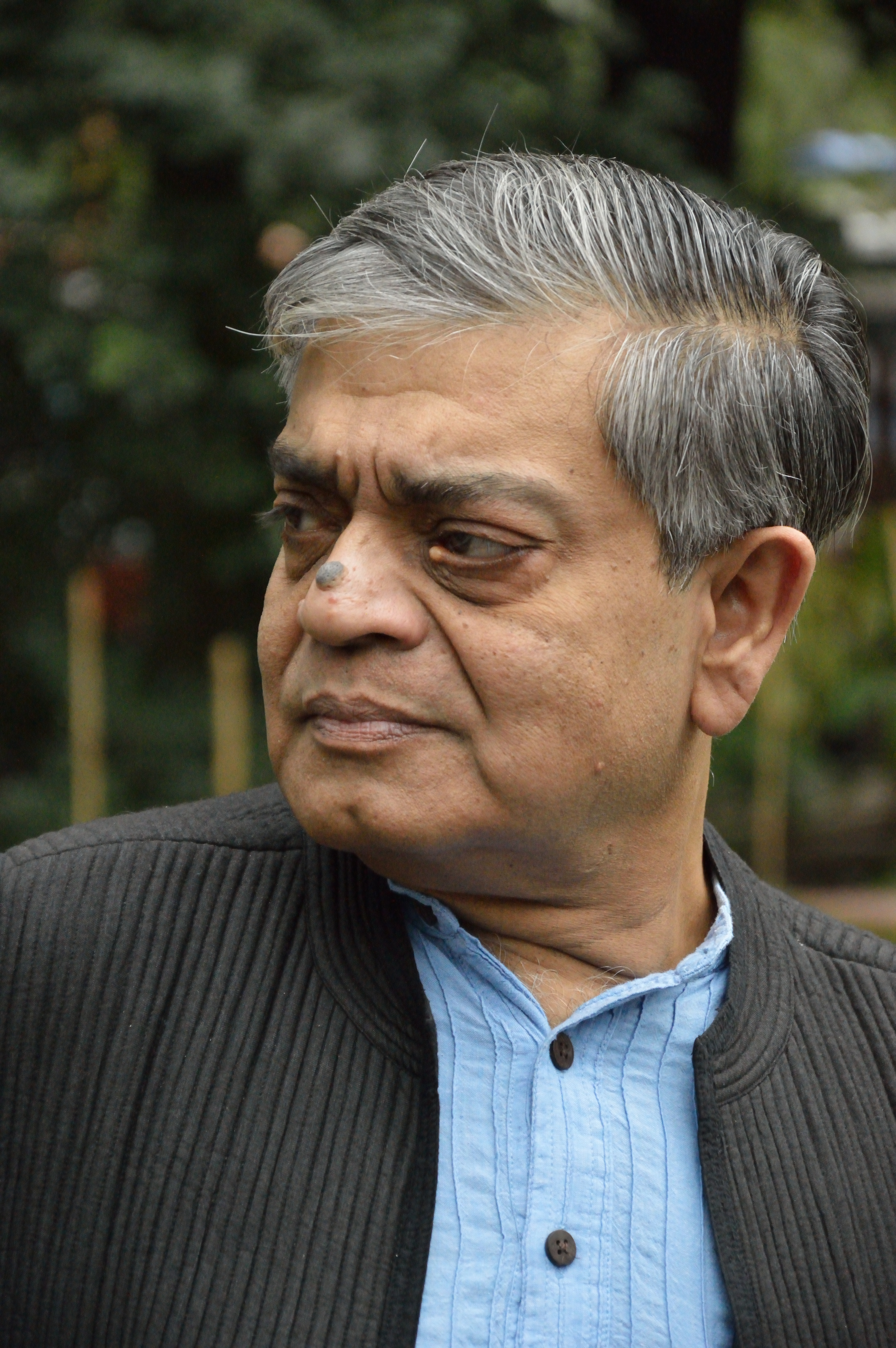
Ray in January 2015

Ray started his professional career in film at the age of 24 as assistant director on the sets of his father's film Shatranj Ke Khilari (The Chess Players, 1977). Before this, he had aided his father in various capacities including still photographer on set. His directorial debut was Phatik Chand (1983) based on Satyajit Ray's Fatik Chand – the film received an award in the International Children's Film Festival in Vancouver.

Sandip Ray is also a noted photographer. He was the director of photography on Satyajit Ray's last three films, Ganashatru (An Enemy of the People, 1989), Shakha Proshakha (The Branches of the Tree, 1990) and Agantuk (The Stranger, 1991).

Sandip Ray also guided the children's magazine Sandesh, which was founded by his great-grandfather Upendrakishore Ray Chowdhury, and continued by his grandfather Sukumar Ray and his father Satyajit Ray. From 1992, after the death of Satyajit, Sandip was the Joint Editor of the Sandesh. Since 2003 he has been the editor of the magazine.

Sandip Ray has recently come up with his account of the time he has had with Feluda, the famous Bengali detective created by his father, in a book named Aami aar Feluda, published by Deep Prakashan. Aami aar Feluda was one of the best sellers at the last Kolkata Book Fair. First published in the magazine Sukhi Grihokon as a short series, Aami aar Feluda retains the flavor of Ekei Bole Shooting, written by Satyajit Ray. Sandip's book deals with the background stories of all Feluda movies and telefilms. Aami aar Feluda is ghost-written by author Sebabrata Banerjee. Sebabrata has tried to follow the smart and fluent style of writing introduced by Satyajit Ray which has made the new Feluda number a good reading experience. He made a video-documentary film on the late Kishore Kumar in 1989.

In 2003, Sandip Ray began working on adapting his father Satyajit Ray's original 1962 story Bankhubabur Bandhu into a Bengali television film of the same name. The film, directed by Kaushik Sen, was eventually shown on Indian television in 2006. He started to score background music for Feluda from the film Bombaiyer Bombete (2003). Sandip Ray used his first written thriller story for his own directed film Hitlist, 2009.

In 2016, he directed a new Feluda film titled Double Feluda which is the sequel to Royal Bengal Rohosso (2011). During the shooting of Double Feluda, produced by Eros International, Sandip Ray filmed his father's famous library.

In 2019, he directed a film titled Professor Shonku O El Dorado, based on a story of Satyajit Ray's Professor Shonku series called Nakur Babu O El Dorado. The film starred veteran actor Dhritiman Chatterjee as Professor Shonku. The film has been produced by SVF Entertainment.

== Filmography ==
Sandip Ray has directed the following TV films and movies:

1. Phatik Chand (Based on a story by Satyajit Ray, 1983), Directorial debut
2. Kissa Kathmandu Mein (Hindi TV film series, 1986)
3. Satyajit Ray Presents II (Hindi TV film series, 1987)
4. Zindagi Ek Safar (A Homevideo Documentary on Kishore Kumar, 1989)
5. Pregnant Silence: Conception of a Genius (A Documentary on a rather surprising personal triumph, 1991)
6. Goopy Bagha Phire Elo (1992) (comedy film)
7. Uttoran (1994)
8. Target (1995)
9. Baksho Rahashya (first TV film of Feluda 30, 1996)
10. Feluda 30 (A series of five TV films based on Feluda, 1996)
11. My Mother: A Freudian introspection (Documentary, 1997)
12. Satyajiter Goppo (A series of four TV films based on four Feluda mysteries and six short films based on six different stories of Satyajit Ray, 1999)
13. Eker Pithe Dui (unreleased series of 12 short films made for television, 2000)
14. Dr. Munshir Diary (A TV film of Satyajiter Priyo Golpo TV film series, 2000)
15. Satyajiter Priyo Galpo (A series of seven TV films including one Feluda film, 2000)
16. Bombaiyer Bombete (Feluda movie, 2003)
17. Nishijapon (2005)
18. Kailashey Kelenkari (Feluda movie, 2007)
19. Tintorettor Jishu (Feluda movie, 2008)
20. Hitlist (2009)
21. Gorosthaney Sabdhan ([Feluda movie, 2010)
22. Royal Bengal Rahashya (Feluda movie, 2011)
23. Jekhane Bhooter Bhoy (2012)
24. Chaar (2014)
25. Badshahi Angti (A stand-alone Feluda reboot, 2014)
26. Monchora (2016)
27. Double Feluda (Feluda movie, 2016)
28. Professor Shonku O El Dorado (2019)
29. Hatyapuri (Feluda movie, 2022)
30. Nayan Rahasya (Feluda movie 2024)

== Books ==
- Aami Aar Feluda (2006, ghost written by Sebabrata Banerjee)
- Cholochitra Jibaner Char Dasak (2024)
- Raybarir Ghore Baire (2025)
- Camson Kamukakur Kirtikalap (2025)
- Probondho Songroho (2025)
- Rabikaku (2026)
- Comics Samagra [Translation] (2026)

== Remarks ==
- Satyajit Ray felt Sandip was the best assistant (director) he ever had. (Satyajit) Ray told–
  Sandip is handicapped by the additional weight of being my son. His latest work – The Return of Goopy & Bagha is hundred percent his own work. Only the plot and a few songs were mine. But the direction, the photography, the script were all Sandip's. In his handling of the camera, he is a master. His skill is better than mine. The bravura work of his cinematography is incomparable...

== See also ==
- Cinema of West Bengal
- Literary works of Satyajit Ray
- Sayantan Ghosal
