= Rabi Ghosh =

Indian Bengali actor (1931–1997)

Robi Ghosh
- Born: Rabindra Nath Ghosh Dostidar; 24 November 1931; Calcutta, Bengal Presidency, British India
- Died: 4 February 1997 (aged 65); Kolkata, West Bengal, India
- Occupations: Actor, Film Director
- Years active: 1959–1997
- Spouse(s): Anubha Gupta (?–1972; her death); Baishakhi Devi (1982–his death)

Robi Ghosh (Bengali: রবি ঘোষ; 24 November 1931 – 4 February 1997) was an Indian actor known for his work in Bengali cinema. He is known for his comic appeal, though his versatile acting talent brought him success in various kinds of roles. He is probably one of the earliest character actors of Bengali cinema who focused mainly on method acting. He was regarded as a prominent megastar in Bengali film Industry. He participated in the Berlin Film Festival as the lead actor of Goopi Gyne Bagha Byne in the role of Bagha Byne, which was one of his most memorable roles. Thereafter, he was a regular member of Satyajit Ray films over the years. Till date, he is remembered for his comic roles in different movies. Robi Ghosh was a renowned actor in Bengali theatre and TV as well. He also played a character, Badridas, in the episode Amrit ki Maut in Byomkesh Bakshi (TV series), broadcast by Doordarshan.

== Early life ==
Ghosh was born on 24 November 1931 in Kolkata. His birth name was Robi Ghosh Dastidar. His ancestry can be traced to East Bengal, now Bangladesh. In 1949, he completed his Matriculation from the South Suburban Main School. After completing his Intermediate in Science, he joined the Asutosh College for graduation. He worked in Bankshall Court from 1953 to 1959. He married actress Anubha Gupta. After her demise, he married Baishakhi Devi on 24 November 1982.

== Career ==
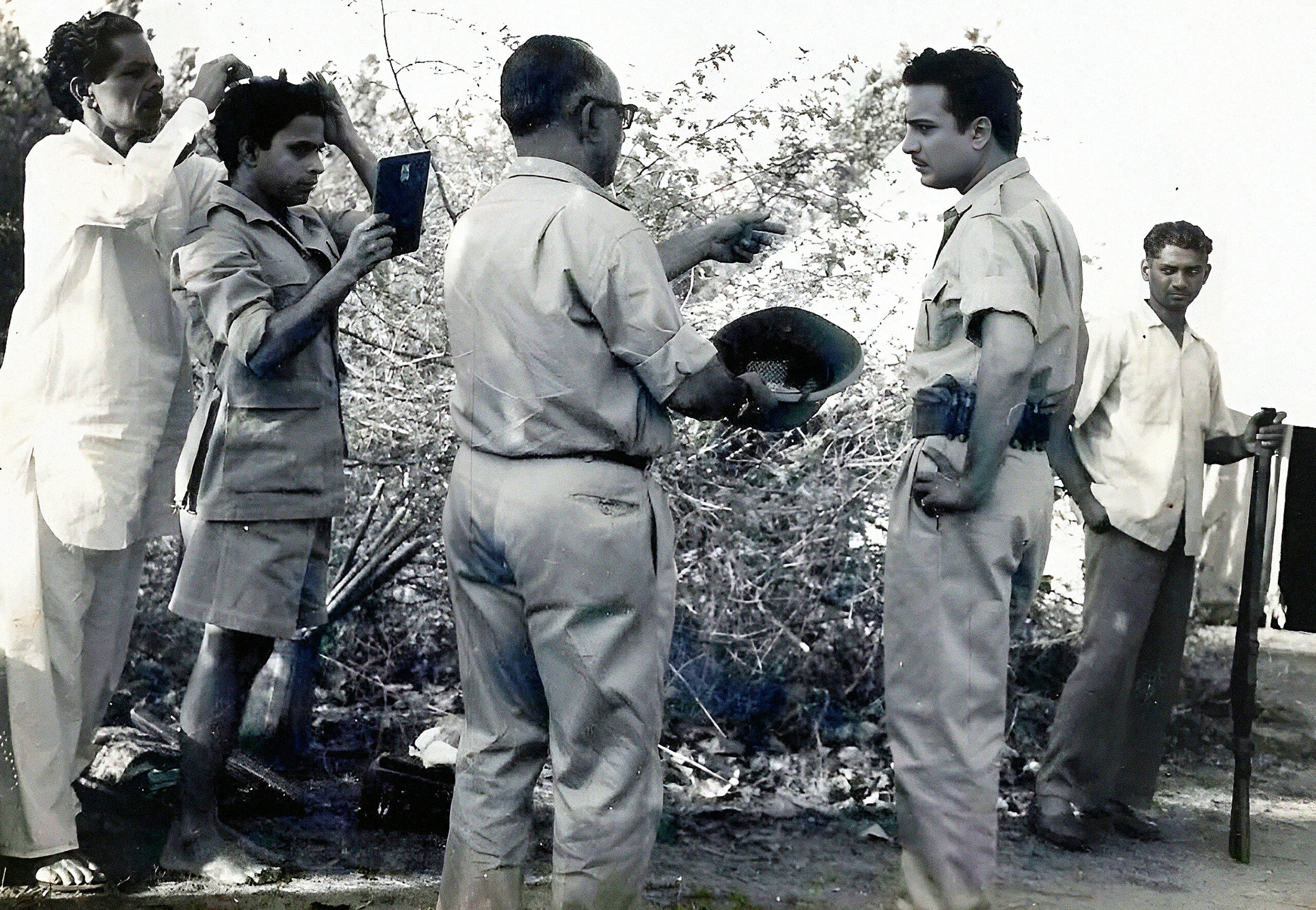
Uttam Kumar and Rabi Ghosh with director Sushil Majumder on the set of Lal Pathore (1964)

Ghosh’s role in the play Angar was noticed by director Aurabinda Mukhopadhay. Robi made his debut in a small role in his film Ahoban in 1959. His breakthrough was in Tapan Sinha's Galpo Holeo Satti, and his role in Satyajit Ray’s Goopy Gyne Bagha Byne (1968) became a landmark in his career. Abhijan (1962), Aranyer Din Ratri (1970), Hirak Rajar Deshe (1980), Goopy Bagha Phire Elo (1991), and Padma Nadir Majhi (1992) are some of his memorable movies. He was also a noted theatre personality who was a student of Utpal Dutta’s Little Theatre Group. He traveled abroad extensively for his performances in Berlin (1969), Mauritius (1988), the USA and Europe (1995). He also directed the movie Nidhiram Sardar. In 1970, he participated in the Berlin Film Festival as the lead actor of Goopi Gyne Bagha Byne in the role of Bagha Byne, which was one of his most memorable roles. He was the founder of the theatre group "Chalachal". In 1960 he was awarded the Ultorath Award for his outstanding performance in the play Angar. He died on 4 February 1997.

== Filmography ==
=== As actor ===
- Kahini (1997) Last film
- Nayantara (1997)
- Gosainpur Sargaram (1997)
- Baksho Rahashya (1996)
- Vrindavan Film Studios (1996)
- Geet Sangeet (1994)
- Phiriye Dao (1994)
- Patang (1993)
- Prajapati (1993)
- Padma Nadir Majhi (1992)
- Agantuk (1991)
- Goopy Bagha Phire Elo (1991)
- Antarjali Yatra (1987)
- Amar Sangi (1987)
- Maha Yatra (1987)
- Amar Geeti (1983)
- Rajbadhu (1982)
- Bancharamer Bagan (1980)
- Heerak Rajar Deshe (1980)
- Paka Dekha (1980)
- Naukadubi (1979)
- Charmurti (1978)
- Mohunbaganer Meye (1976)
- Jana Aranya (1976)
- Chorus (1974)
- Mouchak (1974)
- Sangini (1974)
- Fuleswari (1974)
- Thagini (1974)
- Raktatilak (1974)
- Basanta Bilap (1973)
- Marjina Abdulla (1973)
- Sabuj Dwiper Raja (1973)
- Ajker Nayak (1972)
- Padi Pishir Barmi Baksha (1972)
- Sabse Bada Sukh (1972)
- Dhanyee Meye (1971)
- Aranyer Din Ratri (1970)
- Arogya Niketan (1969)
- Satyakam (1969)
- Apanjan (1968)
- Baghini (1968)
- Goopy Gyne Bagha Byne (1968)
- Ashite Ashiona (1967)
- Balika Badhu (1967)
- Kal Tumi Aleya (1966)
- Monihaar (1966)
- Dol Gobinder Karcha (1966)
- Galpo Holeo Satti (1966)
- Uttarpurush (1966)
- Griha Sandhaney (1966)
- Swapna Niye (1966)
- Arohi (1965)
- Mahapurush (1965)
- Ektuku Basha (1965)
- Surer Aagun (1965)
- Aarohi (1964)
- Lal Pathore (1964)
- Subha O Debotar Grash (1964)
- Momer Alo (1964)
- Abaseshe (1963)
- Nirjan Saikate (1963)
- Kashtipathar (1963)
- Sesh Prahar (1963)
- Chhayasurya (1963)
- Binimoy (1963)
- Nyaydanda (1963)
- Palatak (1963)
- Aagun (1962)
- Abhijan (1962)
- Hansuli Banker Upakatha (1962)
- Megh (1961)
- Kichukkhan (1959)

=== As director ===
- Sadhu Judhishthirer Karcha (1974) (as Ekalavya)
- Nidhi Ram Sardar (1976)

== Awards ==
- Anandalok Award for Nayantara in 1998 (Special Jury Award)
- Kalakar Awards
