= Goopy Bagha Phire Elo =

1992 film by Sandip Ray

- DVD cover art
- Directed by: Sandip Ray
- Written by: Satyajit Ray
- Produced by: Government of West Bengal
- Starring: Tapen Chatterjee; Rabi Ghosh; Ajit Bandyopadhyay
- Edited by: Dulal Dutta
- Music by: Satyajit Ray
- Release date: 3 January 1992
- Running time: 119 minutes
- Country: India
- Language: Bengali
- Budget: ₹30 Lakhs

Goopy Bagha Phirey Elo (lit. 'Goopy and Bagha have returned') is a 1992 Indian Bengali comedy film directed by Sandip Ray and written by Satyajit Ray. A sequel to the 1980 film Hirak Rajar Deshe and the third installment of Goopy Gyne Bagha Byne series, the film was released twelve years after its predecessor. It was the third and last installment of the Goopy–Bagha series.

== Plot ==
Goopy Gyne and Bagha Byne rule the kingdom of Shundi and get bored of enjoying the royal luxuries. They want to get back to the days of adventure they had enjoyed all their lives, but age comes in the way. They leave the kingdom in search of new experiences. Finally, they reach Anandapur and win the king's heart with their musical abilities and powers. In the courtroom, they meet Brahmananda Acharya, who invites Goopy and Bagha to come to Anandagarh fort. When they go to his place, he offers them a job to steal three valuable stones, making use of their miraculous powers gifted by Bhuter Raja (King of Ghosts). In return, he promises to make them 20 years younger. However, that is a lie and he cannot make anyone younger. They steal two rare stones for him in the hope of becoming young again.

The King of Ghost appears in their dream and advises them to keep off injustice. They apologize to him and return the stones to their rightful owners. Brahmananda Acharya had gained immense powers, which is proved when he is not rendered motionless by Goopy's song. But, due to his greed for gaining rare and valuable stones, he is denied immortality. It was foretold that a 12-year boy named Bikram, with divine powers, would defeat him. To prevent his death, Brahmananda Acharya has all the 12-year-old boys in Anandapur, named Bikram, kidnapped by his soldiers. He hypnotized them, making them his servants. In the end, Goopy and Bagha find out that one boy named Kanu was previously named Bikram. At the time of the meeting, Goopy sings a song and Kanu is not hypnotized by it. Kanu receives divine powers at the age of 12. He, along with Goopy, Bagha, and Pradip Pandit, goes towards Anandagarh fort. There, as Bikram enters the fort and comes close to Brahmananda Acharya, the Acharya sinks beneath the ground, signifying that he has been destroyed. His valuable stones also vanish.

== Cast ==
- Tapen Chatterjee as Goopy Gyne
- Rabi Ghosh as Bagha Byne
- Ajit Bandyopadhyay as Brahmananda Acharya
- Kamu Mukherjee as a king
- Haradhan Bandopadhyay as the king of Anandapur
- Pramod Ganguly as Kanu's grandfather
- Bhishma Guhathakurta as Pradip Pandit
- Purab Chatterjee as Kanu/Bikram

== Awards ==
=== BFJA Awards (1993) ===
- Best Indian Films
- Best Art Direction - Ashok Bose
- Best Cinematography - Barun Raha
- Best Editing - Dulal Dutta
- Best Lyrics - Satyajit Ray
- Best Music - Satyajit Ray
- Best Playback Singer (Male) - Anup Ghoshal
- Most Outstanding Work Of The Year - Tapen Chatterjee

== Future ==
Sandip Ray wanted to make another sequel to this series. He had received many requests to make the fourth Goopy - Bagha movie. Ray said to The Times of India about the plot of the fourth film: "Making a Goopy Bagha movie without Tapen and Rabi is unthinkable. The only way I can do a fourth is by taking the story forward and introducing Goopy and Bagha's sons". The idea to weave a story around the next generation came from a line from the introductory song 'Mora dujonai rajar jamai in 'Hirak Rajar Deshe' — "aar ache polapan, ek khan ek khan... (we have one child each)".

== See also ==
- List of Indian superhero films
