= List of awards and nominations received by Satyajit Ray =

Accolades received by Satyajit Ray
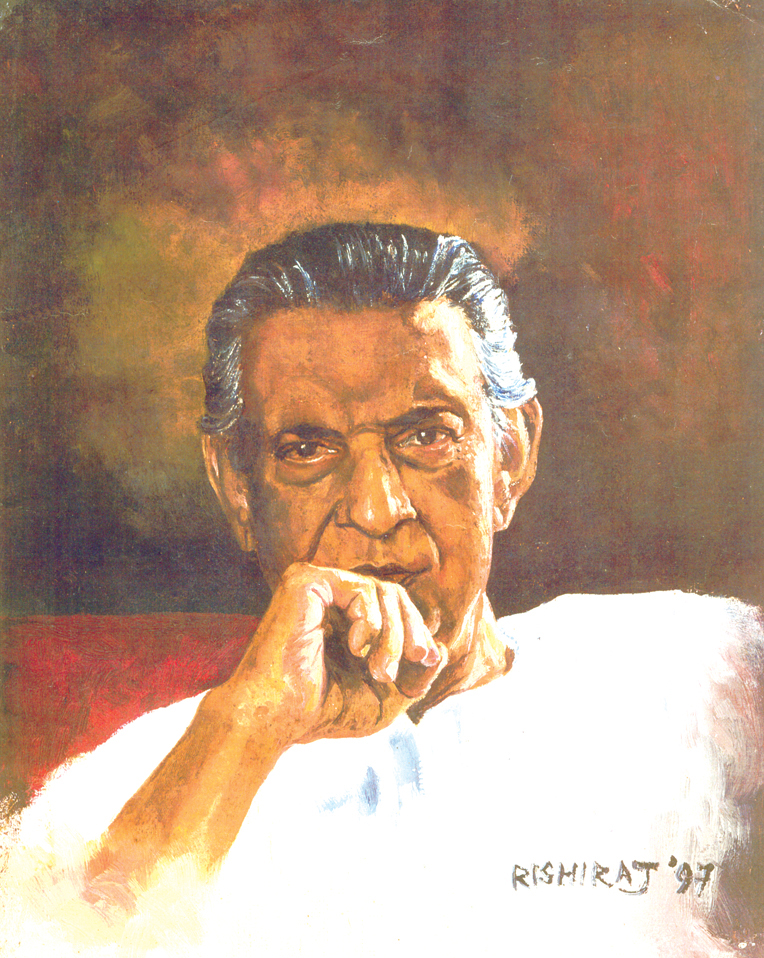
- A portrait of Satyajit Ray
Awards for films (Note: Certain awarding bodies like the National Film Awards do not announce the nominees and only award winners are announced by the jury. For simplification and to avoid errors, each award in this list has been presumed to have had a prior nomination.)
Awards for the films directed by Ray
Film	Won	Nominated
Pather Panchali	18	20
Aparajito	9	10
Parash Pathar	0	1
Jalsaghar	2	3
Apur Sansar	6	7
Devi	1	2
Teen Kanya	5	5
Rabindranath Tagore	3	3
Kanchenjungha	2	2
Abhijan	3	3
Mahanagar	4	5
Charulata	8	9
Two	0	0
Kapurush-O-Mahapurush	1	2
Nayak	7	8
Chiriyakhana	2	2
Goopy Gyne Bagha Byne	11	11
Aranyer Din Ratri	1	1
Pratidwandi	7	7
Seemabaddha	5	5
Sikkim	0	0
The Inner Eye	1	1
Ashani Sanket	6	6
Sonar Kella	8	8
Jana Aranya	5	5
Bala	0	0
Shatranj Ke Khilari	3	3
Joi Baba Felunath	2	2
Hirak Rajar Deshe	2	2
Pikoo	0	0
Sadgati	1	1
Ghare Baire	2	3
Sukumar Ray	0	0
Ganashatru	1	1
Shakha Proshakha	1	1
Agantuk	7	7
- Total number of awards and nominations
Totals	134	146
Awards for the films contributed by Ray
Film	Won	Nominated
Baksa Badal	1	1
Goopy Bagha Phire Elo	2	2
Uttoran	1	1
- Total number of awards and nominations
Totals	4	4

Satyajit Ray (2 May 1921 – 23 April 1992) was an Indian filmmaker who worked prominently in Bengali cinema. Ray received numerous awards and honours, including India's highest award in cinema, the Dadasaheb Phalke Award (1984) and India's highest civilian award, the Bharat Ratna (1992). He was also awarded the Commander of the National Order of the Legion of Honour, the highest decoration in France (1987) and an Honorary Award at the 64th Academy Awards (1991).

Often regarded as one of the greatest filmmakers of world cinema, Ray made his directorial debut in 1955 with Pather Panchali. The film earned critical acclaim and was awarded under the Best Film category at various award ceremonies and film festivals, including the 3rd National Film Awards (1955), 7th Berlin International Film Festival (1957), and 1st San Francisco International Film Festival (1957). Pather Panchali was also awarded the "Prix du document humain" prize at the 9th Cannes Film Festival (1956). Ray won thirty-five National Film Awards during his four-decade career. Six of his films—Pather Panchali, Apur Sansar (1959), Charulata (1964), Goopy Gyne Bagha Byne (1968), Seemabaddha (1971), and Agantuk (1991)—won the Best Feature Film. Three films—Jalsaghar (1958), Abhijan (1962), and Pratidwandi (1970)—were awarded with Second Best Feature Film and Mahanagar (1963) was adjudged the Third Best Feature Film. Ray's 1961 documentary on Nobel laureate Rabindranath Tagore received awards at the Locarno and Montevideo film festivals as well as the National Film Award for Best Non-Feature Film. His Hindi film Shatranj Ke Khilari (1977) won the National Film Award for Best Feature Film in Hindi, and the Filmfare Award for Best Director. Ray's Apu Trilogy (1955–59), comprising Pather Panchali, Aparajito (1956) and Apur Sansar (1959), appeared in Time's All-Time 100 Movies in 2005.

Ray won 21 awards for his direction, including seven Bengal Film Journalists' Association Awards, six Indian National Film Awards, two Silver Bear awards at the Berlin International Film Festival, and two Golden Gate Awards at the San Francisco International Film Festival. In addition to directing, Ray was a music composer and also wrote the screenplay, lyrics, and dialogues for several films. He won twelve awards for his screenplay writing, including one posthumous award in 1994, one award for his original story idea, seven awards for his dialogues, five awards for his music compositions, and two awards for lyric-writing.

Ray also received various awards and honours at international film festivals and universities. These include awards at the 9th Chicago International Film Festival (1973), 28th Berlin International Film Festival (1978), 11th Moscow International Film Festival (1979), 35th Cannes Film Festival (1982), 39th Venice International Film Festival (1982), 4th Tokyo International Film Festival (1991), and 35th San Francisco International Film Festival (1992). He was also awarded an honorary doctorate from the Royal College of Art (1974), a Doctor of Letters from the University of Oxford (1978), the British Film Institute Fellowship (1983), and two Sangeet Natak Akademi awards (1959, 1986). He is the only Indian to receive two out of Big Three film festivals top prizes.

== Honorary awards ==
List of awards and honours conferred on Satyajit Ray
Year	No.	Awards and honours	Awarding body	Refs.
1958	1	Padma Shri	Government of India	
1959	2	Sangeet Natak Akademi Puraskar	Sangeet Natak Akademi	
1965	3	Padma Bhushan	Government of India	
1967	4	JLCCA Ramon Magsaysay Award	Ramon Magsaysay Award Foundation	
1971	5	Yugoslav Star with Golden Wreath	Government of Yugoslavia	
1973	6	Doctor of Letters	University of Delhi	
1973	7	Festival Honoree	Chicago International Film Festival (9th)	
1974	8	Honorary Doctors	Royal College of Art	
1976	9	Padma Vibhushan	Government of India	
1976	10	Desikottam	Visva-Bharati University	
1978	11	Doctor of Letters	University of Oxford	
1978	12	Special Award	Berlin International Film Festival (28th)	
1979	13	Special Award	Moscow International Film Festival (11th)	
1980	14	Doctor of Letters	University of Burdwan	
1980	15	Doctor of Letters	Jadavpur University	
1981	16	Doctorate	Banaras Hindu University	
1981	17	Doctor of Letters	University of North Bengal	
1982	18	Hommage à Satyajit Ray	Cannes Film Festival (35th)	
1982	19	Golden Lion Honorary Award	Venice Film Festival (39th)	
1982	20	Vidyasagar Smriti Puraskar (Literature)	Government of West Bengal	
1983	21	British Film Institute Fellowship	British Film Institute	
1984	22	Dadasaheb Phalke Award	Directorate of Film Festivals	
1985	23	Doctor of Literature	University of Calcutta	
1985	24	Soviet Land Nehru Award	Soviet Union	
1986	25	Sangeet Natak Akademi Fellowship	Sangeet Natak Akademi	
1987	26	Dadabhai Naoroji Memorial Award	Government of India (Ministry of Science and Technology)	
1987	27	Commander of the Legion of Honour	Government of France	
1987	28	Doctor of Letters	Rabindra Bharati University	
1991	29	Academy Honorary Award	Academy of Motion Picture Arts and Sciences (64th)	
1991	30	Special Achievement Award	Tokyo International Film Festival (4th)	
1992	31	Akira Kurosawa Award	San Francisco International Film Festival (35th)	
1992	32	Bharat Ratna	Government of India	

== Bengal Film Journalists' Association Awards ==
The Bengal Film Journalists' Association Awards, commonly referred as BFJA Awards, are awarded annually by The Bengal Film Journalists' Association founded in 1937. Ray won thirty-nine awards for sixteen of his films and three awards for two films by other directors; Nityananda Dutta and Sandip Ray.

List of Bengal Film Journalists' Association Awards presented to Satyajit Ray's films
Year	Film	Ceremony	Category	Result	Refs.
1962	Teen Kanya	25th Annual BFJA Awards	Best Director	Won	
1962	Teen Kanya	25th Annual BFJA Awards	Best Indian Films	Won	
1963	Abhijan	26th Annual BFJA Awards	Best Director	Won	
1963	Abhijan	26th Annual BFJA Awards	Best Indian Films	Won	
1963	Kanchenjungha	26th Annual BFJA Awards	Best Indian Films	Won	
1963	Kanchenjungha	26th Annual BFJA Awards	Best Dialogue	Won	
1964	Mahanagar	27th Annual BFJA Awards	Best Indian Films	Won	
1964	Mahanagar	27th Annual BFJA Awards	Best Dialogue	Won	
1965	Charulata	28th Annual BFJA Awards	Best Director	Won	
1965	Charulata	28th Annual BFJA Awards	Best Indian Films	Won	
1965	Charulata	28th Annual BFJA Awards	Best Screenplay	Won	
1965	Charulata	28th Annual BFJA Awards	Best Music Director	Won	
1966	Baksa Badal (Note: The film was directed by Nityananda Dutta. Ray composed the music for the film and wrote the screenplay along with the dialogue.)	29th Annual BFJA Awards	Best Dialogue	Won	
1966	Kapurush-O-Mahapurush • Kapurush • Mahapurush	29th Annual BFJA Awards	Best Indian Films	Won	
1967	Nayak	30th Annual BFJA Awards	Best Director	Won	
1967	Nayak	30th Annual BFJA Awards	Best Indian Films	Won	
1967	Nayak	30th Annual BFJA Awards	Best Screenplay	Won	
1967	Nayak	30th Annual BFJA Awards	Best Dialogue	Won	
1970	Goopy Gyne Bagha Byne	33rd Annual BFJA Awards	Best Director	Won	
1970	Goopy Gyne Bagha Byne	33rd Annual BFJA Awards	Best Indian Films	Won	
1970	Goopy Gyne Bagha Byne	33rd Annual BFJA Awards	Best Screenplay	Won	
1970	Goopy Gyne Bagha Byne	33rd Annual BFJA Awards	Best Music Director	Won	
1970	Goopy Gyne Bagha Byne	33rd Annual BFJA Awards	Best Lyricist	Won	
1970	Goopy Gyne Bagha Byne	33rd Annual BFJA Awards	Best Dialogue	Won	
1971	Aranyer Din Ratri	34th Annual BFJA Awards	Best Indian Films	Won	
1971	Pratidwandi	34th Annual BFJA Awards	Best Indian Films	Won	
1971	Pratidwandi	34th Annual BFJA Awards	Best Director	Won	
1971	Pratidwandi	34th Annual BFJA Awards	Best Screenplay	Won	
1971	Pratidwandi	34th Annual BFJA Awards	Best Dialogue	Won	
1972	Seemabaddha	35th Annual BFJA Awards	Best Indian Films	Won	
1972	Seemabaddha	35th Annual BFJA Awards	Best Screenplay	Won	
1972	Seemabaddha	35th Annual BFJA Awards	Best Dialogue	Won	
1974	Ashani Sanket	37th Annual BFJA Awards	Best Indian Films	Won	
1975	Sonar Kella	38th Annual BFJA Awards	Best Indian Films	Won	
1986	Ghare Baire	49th Annual BFJA Awards	Best Indian Films	Won	
1993	Agantuk	56th Annual BFJA Awards	Best Director	Won	
1993	Agantuk	56th Annual BFJA Awards	Best Indian Films	Won	
1993	Agantuk	56th Annual BFJA Awards	Best Screenplay	Won	
1993	Agantuk	56th Annual BFJA Awards	Best Original Story	Won	
1993	Goopy Bagha Phire Elo (Note: The film was directed by Sandip Ray. Satyajit Ray composed the music for the film and wrote the screenplay along with the lyrics.)	56th Annual BFJA Awards	Best Music Director	Won	
1993	Goopy Bagha Phire Elo	56th Annual BFJA Awards	Best Lyricist	Won	
1993	Shakha Proshakha	56th Annual BFJA Awards	Best Indian Films	Won	

== Bodil Awards ==
Established in 1948, the Bodil Awards are presented annually at a ceremony in Copenhagen by Danish Film Critics Association. Ray received two awards.

List of Bodil Awards presented to Satyajit Ray's films
Year	Film	Ceremony	Category	Result	Refs.
1967	Aparajito	21st Bodil Awards	Best Non-European Film	Won	
1969	Pather Panchali	23rd Bodil Awards	Best Non-European Film	Won	

== British Academy Film Awards ==
The British Academy Film Awards is an annual event organised by the British Academy of Film and Television Arts (BAFTA). Ray received three nominations.

List of British Academy Film Awards presented to Satyajit Ray's films
Year	Film	Ceremony	Category	Result	Refs.
1958	Pather Panchali	11th British Academy Film Awards	Best Film from Any Source	Nominated	
1959	Aparajito	12th British Academy Film Awards	Best Film from Any Source	Nominated	
1962	Apur Sansar	15th British Academy Film Awards	Best Film from Any Source	Nominated	

== Filmfare Awards ==
The Filmfare Awards are presented annually by The Times Group for the Bollywood films. Ray received two awards.

List of Filmfare Awards presented to Satyajit Ray's films
Year	Film	Ceremony	Category	Result	Refs.
1977	Shatranj Ke Khilari	26th Filmfare Awards	Critics Award for Best Movie	Won	
1977	Shatranj Ke Khilari	26th Filmfare Awards	Best Director	Won	

== National Board of Review ==
Established in 1909, the National Board of Review awards are awarded annually by The National Board of Review of Motion Pictures. Ray received four awards.

List of National Board of Review Awards presented to Satyajit Ray's films
Year	Film	Ceremony	Category	Result	Refs.
1958	Pather Panchali	30th National Board of Review Awards	Best Foreign Language Film	Won	
1958	Pather Panchali	30th National Board of Review Awards	Top Foreign Language Films	Won	
1960	Apur Sansar	32nd National Board of Review Awards	Best Foreign Language Film	Won	
1960	Apur Sansar	32nd National Board of Review Awards	Top Foreign Language Films	Won	

== National Film Awards ==
The Indian National Film Awards are presented by Directorate of Film Festivals during its annual ceremony to honour the best films of the Indian cinema in the given year. Ray won thirty-five awards for twenty-five of his films and one posthumous award for the film directed by his son Sandip Ray. He won maximum number of awards (six) for the Best Director.

Key
†	Indicates certificate of merit	‡	Indicates a posthumous win

List of National Film Awards presented to Satyajit Ray's films
Year	Film	Ceremony	Category		Result	Refs.
1955	Pather Panchali	3rd National Film Awards	Best Feature Film		Won	
1955	Pather Panchali	3rd National Film Awards	Best Feature Film in Bengali		Won	
1958	Jalsaghar	6th National Film Awards	Second Best Feature Film	^{†}	Won	
1958	Jalsaghar	6th National Film Awards	Best Feature Film in Bengali	^{†}	Won	
1959	Apur Sansar	7th National Film Awards	Best Feature Film		Won	
1960	Devi	8th National Film Awards	Best Feature Film in Bengali		Won	
1961	Teen Kanya (Note: The award was given to one of three parts of the film, Samapti.)	9th National Film Awards	Best Feature Film in Bengali		Won	
1961	Rabindranath Tagore	9th National Film Awards	Best Documentary Film		Won	
1962	Abhijan	10th National Film Awards	Second Best Feature Film	^{†}	Won	
1963	Mahanagar	11th National Film Awards	Third Best Feature Film	^{†}	Won	
1964	Charulata	12th National Film Awards	Best Feature Film		Won	
1966	Nayak	14th National Film Awards	Best Screenplay		Won	
1967	Chiriyakhana	15th National Film Awards	Best Director		Won	
1968	Goopy Gyne Bagha Byne	16th National Film Awards	Best Feature Film		Won	
1968	Goopy Gyne Bagha Byne	16th National Film Awards	Best Director		Won	
1970	Pratidwandi	18th National Film Awards	Second Best Feature Film		Won	
1970	Pratidwandi	18th National Film Awards	Best Director		Won	
1970	Pratidwandi	18th National Film Awards	Best Screenplay		Won	
1971	Seemabaddha	19th National Film Awards	Best Feature Film		Won	
1972	The Inner Eye	20th National Film Awards	Best Information Film (Documentary)		Won	
1973	Ashani Sanket	21st National Film Awards	Best Feature Film in Bengali		Won	
1973	Ashani Sanket	21st National Film Awards	Best Music Director		Won	
1974	Sonar Kella	22nd National Film Awards	Best Director		Won	
1974	Sonar Kella	22nd National Film Awards	Best Screenplay		Won	
1974	Sonar Kella	22nd National Film Awards	Best Feature Film in Bengali		Won	
1975	Jana Aranya	23rd National Film Awards	Best Director		Won	
1977	Shatranj Ke Khilari	25th National Film Awards	Best Feature Film in Hindi		Won	
1978	Joi Baba Felunath	26th National Film Awards	Best Children's Film		Won	
1980	Hirak Rajar Deshe	28th National Film Awards	Best Music Director		Won	
1980	Hirak Rajar Deshe	28th National Film Awards	Best Feature Film in Bengali		Won	
1981	Sadgati	29th National Film Awards	Special Jury Award		Won	
1984	Ghare Baire	32nd National Film Awards	Best Feature Film in Bengali		Won	
1989	Ganashatru	37th National Film Awards	Best Feature Film in Bengali		Won	
1991	Agantuk	39th National Film Awards	Best Feature Film		Won	
1991	Agantuk	39th National Film Awards	Best Director		Won	
1994	Uttoran (Note: The film was directed by Sandip Ray. Satyajit Ray wrote the screenplay for the film.)	41st National Film Awards	Best Screenplay	^{‡}	Won	

== Other annual film awards ==
Year	Film	Ceremony	Category	Result	Refs.
1967	Pather Panchali	40th Kinema Junpo Awards	Best Foreign Film	Won	
1968	Chiriyakhana	West Bengal Government Film Awards	Best Direction	Won	
1973	Ashani Sanket	West Bengal Government Film Awards	Best Film	Won	
1974	Sonar Kella	West Bengal Government Film Awards	Best Film	Won	
1974	Sonar Kella	West Bengal Government Film Awards	Best Direction	Won	
1974	Sonar Kella	West Bengal Government Film Awards	Best Screenplay	Won	
1975	Jana Aranya	West Bengal Government Film Awards	Best Film	Won	
1975	Jana Aranya	West Bengal Government Film Awards	Best Direction	Won	
1975	Jana Aranya	West Bengal Government Film Awards	Best Screenplay	Won	

== Major film festival awards ==
=== Berlin International Film Festival ===
Founded in 1951, the Berlin International Film Festival, also called the Berlinale, is an annual film festival held in Berlin, Germany. Ray won nine awards and three nominations for seven of his films. He is one of the four directors to win the Silver Bear for Best Director more than once and received maximum number of nominations (seven) for the Golden Bear for Best Film.

List of awards presented to Satyajit Ray's films at Berlin International Film Festival
Year	Film	Film festival	Category	Result	Refs.
1957	Pather Panchali	7th Berlin International Film Festival	Selznick Golden Laurel for Best Film	Won	
1960	Aparajito	10th Berlin International Film Festival	Selznick Golden Laurel for Best Film	Won	
1963	Teen Kanya	13th Berlin International Film Festival	Selznick Golden Laurel for Best Film	Won	
1964	Mahanagar	14th Berlin International Film Festival	Golden Bear for Best Film	Nominated	
1964	Mahanagar	14th Berlin International Film Festival	Silver Bear for Best Director	Won	
1965	Charulata	15th Berlin International Film Festival	Golden Bear for Best Film	Nominated	
1965	Charulata	15th Berlin International Film Festival	Silver Bear for Best Director	Won	
1965	Charulata	15th Berlin International Film Festival	OCIC Catholic Award	Won	
1966	Nayak	16th Berlin International Film Festival	Golden Bear for Best Film	Nominated	
1966	Nayak	16th Berlin International Film Festival	Special Recognition	Won	
1966	Nayak	16th Berlin International Film Festival	Critics' Prize (UNICRIT Award)	Won	
1973	Ashani Sanket	23rd Berlin International Film Festival	Golden Bear for Best Film	Won	

=== Cannes Film Festival ===
Originally set to be held in 1939 but subsequently held in 1946, the Cannes Film Festival is an annual film festival held in Cannes, France. Ray won two awards and four nominations for four of his films.

List of awards presented to Satyajit Ray's films at Cannes Film Festival
Year	Film	Film festival	Category	Result	Refs.
1956	Pather Panchali	1956 Cannes Film Festival	Palme d'Or for Best Film	Nominated	
1956	Pather Panchali	1956 Cannes Film Festival	Prix du document humain	Won	
1956	Pather Panchali	1956 Cannes Film Festival	OCIC Catholic Award	Won	
1958	Parash Pathar	1958 Cannes Film Festival	Palme d'Or for Best Film	Nominated	
1962	Devi	1962 Cannes Film Festival	Palme d'Or for Best Film	Nominated	
1984	Ghare Baire	1984 Cannes Film Festival	Palme d'Or for Best Film	Nominated	

=== San Francisco International Film Festival ===
Organized by the San Francisco Film Society and founded in 1957, the San Francisco International Film Festival is billed as "the longest-running film festival in the Americas". Ray won four awards for two of his films.

List of awards presented to Satyajit Ray's films at San Francisco International Film Festival
Year	Film	Film festival	Category	Result	Refs.
1957	Pather Panchali	1st San Francisco International Film Festival	Golden Gate Award for Best Film	Won	
1957	Pather Panchali	1st San Francisco International Film Festival	Golden Gate Award for Best Director	Won	
1958	Aparajito	2nd San Francisco International Film Festival	Golden Gate Award for Best Film	Won	
1958	Aparajito	2nd San Francisco International Film Festival	Golden Gate Award for Best Director	Won	

=== Venice Film Festival ===
Initially named as "Esposizione d'Arte Cinematografica", the Venice Film Festival was founded in 1932 as part of the 18th Venice Biennale. Ray won five awards and one nomination for four of his films.

List of awards presented to Satyajit Ray's films at Venice Film Festival
Year	Film	Film festival	Category	Result	Refs.
1957	Aparajito	18th Venice International Film Festival	Golden Lion for Best Film	Won	
1957	Aparajito	18th Venice International Film Festival	Cinema Nuovo Award	Won	
1957	Aparajito	18th Venice International Film Festival	FIPRESCI Critics' Award	Won	
1965	Kapurush	26th Venice International Film Festival	Golden Lion for Best Film	Nominated	
1972	Seemabaddha	33rd Venice International Film Festival	FIPRESCI Critics' Award	Won	

=== Other international film festival awards ===
List of awards presented to Satyajit Ray's films at various international film festivals
Year	Film	Film festival	Category	Result	Refs.
1956	Pather Panchali	9th Edinburgh International Film Festival	Diploma Of Merit	Won	
1956	Pather Panchali	Manila Film Festival	Golden Carbao	Won	
1956	Pather Panchali	Rome Film Festival	Vatican Award	Won	
1958	Pather Panchali	Stratford Film Festival	Critics' Award for Best Film of the Year	Won	
1958	Pather Panchali	Vancouver International Film Festival	Best Film	Won	
1958–59	Aparajito	USA Film Festival	Golden Laurel for Best Foreign Film	Won	
1959	Jalsaghar	1st Moscow International Film Festival	Grand prix for Best Film	Nominated	
1959	Pather Panchali	New York Film Festival	Cultural Award: Best Foreign Film	Won	
1960	Apur Sansar	7th BFI London Film Festival	Sutherland Trophy for Best Original And Imaginative Film	Won	
1961	Apur Sansar	14th Edinburgh International Film Festival	Diploma Of Merit	Won	
1961	Rabindranath Tagore	14th Locarno International Film Festival	Golden Sail for Short Films	Won	
1962	Two Daughters (Note: The original title of the film Teen Kanya means three daughters (or girls), however the international version of the film is titled Two Daughters. Though the feature film has three different stories, only two of them were included for the international release—The Postmaster and Samapti.)	10th Melbourne International Film Festival	Golden Boomerang for Best Film	Won	
1962	Rabindranath Tagore	Montevideo Film Festival	Special Mention	Won	
1965	Charulata	Acapulco Film Festival	Best Film	Won	
1969	Goopy Gyne Bagha Byne	Auckland International Film Festival	Silver Cross Award for Best Direction and Originality	Won	
1970	Goopy Gyne Bagha Byne	18th Melbourne International Film Festival	Best Film	Won	
1970	Goopy Gyne Bagha Byne	Tokyo Film Festival	Merit Award	Won	
1973	Ashani Sanket	9th Chicago International Film Festival	Gold Hugo for Best Feature Film	Won	
1975	Sonar Kella	10th Teheran International Festival of Films for Children and Young Adults	Golden Statue for Best Live Feature Film	Won	
1976	Jana Aranya	30th Karlovy Vary International Film Festival	Karlovy Vary Prize	Won	
1979	Joi Baba Felunath	3rd Hong Kong International Film Festival	Best Feature Film	Won	
1980	Pather Panchali	27th BFI London Film Festival	Wington Award	Won	
1980	Aparajito	27th BFI London Film Festival	Wington Award	Won	
1980	Apur Sansar	27th BFI London Film Festival	Wington Award	Won	

== Bibliography ==
- Ray, Bijoya (2012). Manik and I: My Life with Satyajit Ray. Penguin Books. p. 624. ISBN 978-81-8475-750-7.
- Ray, Satyajit (2013). Ray, Sandip (ed.). Satyajit Ray on Cinema. Columbia University Press. p. 171. ISBN 978-0-231-16495-5.
- Robinson, Andrew (1989). Satyajit Ray: The Inner Eye. I.B. Tauris. ISBN 1-86064-965-3.
