= Satyajit Ray filmography =

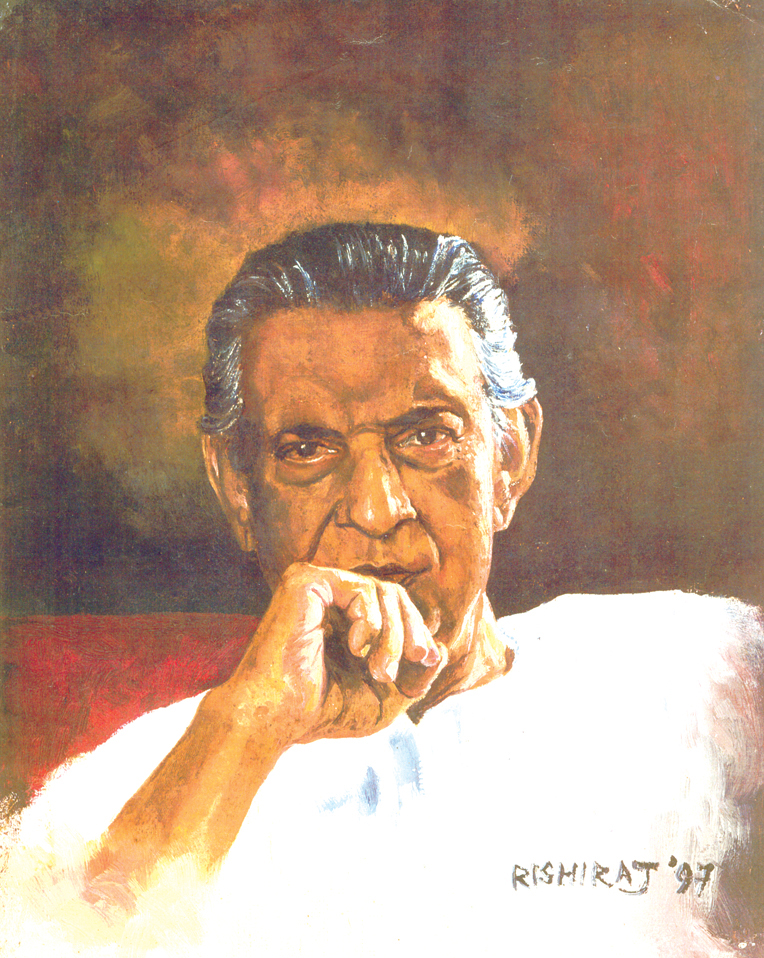
A portrait of Satyajit Ray

Satyajit Ray (2 May 1921 – 23 April 1992) was an Indian filmmaker who worked prominently in Bengali cinema and who has often been regarded as one of the greatest and most influential directors in the History of cinema. Ray was born in Calcutta (now Kolkata) to a Bengali family and started his career as a junior visualiser. His meeting with French film director Jean Renoir, who had come to Calcutta in 1949 to shoot his film The River (1951), and his 1950 visit to London, where he saw Vittorio De Sica's Ladri di biciclette (Bicycle Thieves) (1948), inspired Ray to become a film-maker. Ray made his directorial debut in 1955 with Pather Panchali and directed 36 films, comprising 29 feature films, five documentaries, and two short films.

Although Ray's work generally received critical acclaim, his film Pather Panchali and Ashani Sanket (1973) were criticised for "exporting poverty" and "distorting India's image abroad". His Apu Trilogy (1955–1959) appeared in Time's All-Time 100 Movies in 2005. Aside from directing, Ray composed music and wrote screenplays for films, both his own and those by other directors. Often credited as a fiction writer, illustrator, and calligrapher; Ray authored several short stories and novels in Bengali, most of which were aimed at children and adolescents. Some of his short stories have been adapted into films by other directors, including his only son, Sandip Ray. Considered a cultural icon in India and acknowledged for his contribution to Indian cinema, Ray has influenced several filmmakers around the world, including Wes Anderson, Martin Scorsese, James Ivory, François Truffaut, Carlos Saura, and Christopher Nolan.

Ray intended to make various other films, including The Alien, whose early script is sometimes said to have inspired Steven Spielberg's 1982 film E.T.; a documentary on Indian sitar player Ravi Shankar; an adaptation of the ancient Indian epic, the Mahābhārata; and an adaptation of E. M. Forster's 1924 novel, A Passage to India. However, none had been started when he died in 1992.

Ray received numerous awards at international film festivals and elsewhere, including several Indian National Film Awards and an honorary Academy Award at the 64th Academy Awards in 1992. Ray was awarded India's highest award in cinema, the Dadasaheb Phalke Award, in 1984 and India's highest civilian award, Bharat Ratna, in 1992.

== Key ==
Key
†	Indicates a documentary	‡	Indicates a short film	§	Indicates a television film/series	#	Indicates an advertisement film

== Filmography ==
List of films directed by Satyajit Ray (Note: Satyajit Ray filmography @ satyajitray.org: "Films directed by Ray". satyajitray.org. Archived from the original on 26 July 2013.; "Contributions by Ray". satyajitray.org. Archived from the original on 9 January 2013.; "Documentaries and TV shows about Ray". satyajitray.org. Archived from the original on 7 January 2013.) (Note: Satyajit Ray filmography @ satyajitrayworld.com: "Filmography". satyajitrayworld.com. Archived from the original on 31 December 2012.; "Contributions by Ray". satyajitrayworld.com. Archived from the original on 3 February 2013.; "Unmade Ray". satyajitrayworld.com. Archived from the original on 15 March 2013.)
Year	Original title	International release title	Language(s)	Producer	Music	Screenplay	Writer	Other
1955	Pather Panchali (The Apu Trilogy)	A Song of the Little Road	Bengali			Yes		
1956	Aparajito (The Apu Trilogy)	The Unvanquished	Bengali	Yes		Yes		
1958	Parash Pathar	The Philosopher's Stone	Bengali			Yes		Dialogue
1958	Jalsaghar	The Music Room	Bengali	Yes		Yes		Distributor
1959	Apur Sansar (The Apu Trilogy)	The World of Apu	Bengali	Yes		Yes		Distributor
1960	Devi	The Goddess	Bengali	Yes		Yes		Distributor
1961	Teen Kanya • The Postmaster • Monihara • Samapti	Three Daughters / Two Daughters (Note: The title of the film Teen Kanya means three daughters (or girls), however the international version of the film is titled Two Daughters. Though the feature film has three different stories, only two of them were included for the international release—The Postmaster and Samapti) • The Postmaster • The Lost Jewels • The Conclusion	Bengali	Yes	Yes	Yes		Distributor
1961	Rabindranath Tagore ^{†}	Rabindranath Tagore	English			Yes	Yes	Narrator
1962	Kanchenjungha	Kanchanjangha	Bengali		Yes	Yes	Yes	
1962	Abhijan	The Expedition	Bengali		Yes	Yes		
1963	Mahanagar	The Big City	Bengali		Yes	Yes		
1964	Charulata	The Lonely Wife	Bengali		Yes	Yes		
1964	Two ^{‡}	Two	No spoken language		Yes	Yes		
1965	Kapurush-O-Mahapurush • Kapurush • Mahapurush	• The Coward • The Holy Man	Bengali		Yes	Yes		
1966	Nayak	The Hero	Bengali		Yes	Yes	Yes	
1967	Chiriyakhana	The Zoo	Bengali		Yes	Yes		Lyricist
1969	Goopy Gyne Bagha Byne	The Adventures of Goopy and Bagha	Bengali		Yes	Yes		• Costume designer • Lyricist
1970	Aranyer Din Ratri	Days and Nights in the Forest	Bengali		Yes	Yes		
1970	Pratidwandi (The Calcutta Trilogy)	The Adversary	Bengali		Yes	Yes		
1971	Seemabaddha (The Calcutta Trilogy)	Company Limited	Bengali		Yes	Yes	Yes	
1971	Sikkim ^{†}	Sikkim	English		Yes	Yes	Yes	• Narrator • Sound designer
1972	The Inner Eye ^{†}	The Inner Eye	Bengali		Yes	Yes	Yes	• Narrator • Sound designer
1973	Ashani Sanket	Distant Thunder	Bengali		Yes	Yes		
1974	Sonar Kella (Note: Based on a novel: Sonar Kella by Ray.)	The Fortress	Bengali		Yes	Yes	Yes	
1975	Jana Aranya (The Calcutta Trilogy)	The Middleman	Bengali		Yes	Yes	Yes	
1976	Bala ^{†}	Bala	English		Yes	Yes	Yes	Narrator
1977	Shatranj Ke Khilari	The Chess Players	• Hindi • Urdu • English		Yes	Yes	Yes	Dialogue
1979	Joi Baba Felunath (Note: Based on a novel: Joi Baba Felunath by Ray.)	The Elephant God	Bengali		Yes	Yes	Yes	
1980	Hirak Rajar Deshe	The Kingdom of Diamonds	Bengali		Yes	Yes	Yes	• Art director • Costume designer • Lyricist
1980	Pikoo (Note: Based on a short story named Pikoor Diary (Pikoo's Diary), written by Ray for one of his books, Pikoor Diary O Onyanyo (Pikoo's Diary and Other Stories).) ^{§}	Pikoo's Day	Bengali		Yes	Yes	Yes	
1981	Sadgati	Deliverance	Hindi		Yes	Yes		Dialogue
1984	Ghare Baire	The Home and The World	Bengali		Yes	Yes		
1987	Sukumar Ray ^{†}	Sukumar Ray	Bengali		Yes	Yes	Yes	
1989	Ganashatru	An Enemy of the People	Bengali		Yes	Yes		
1990	Shakha Proshakha	The Branches of the Tree	Bengali	Yes	Yes	Yes	Yes	Distributor
1991	Agantuk (Note: Based on a short story named Atithi (The Guest) by Ray.)	The Stranger	Bengali		Yes	Yes	Yes	

== Contributed to by Ray ==
List of films contributed to by Satyajit Ray
Year	Original title	Language(s)	Director	Composer	Screenplay	Writer	Other
1948	A Perfect Day ^{†}	English	Harisadhan Dasgupta		Yes		Documentary film
1951	The River	• Bengali • English	Jean Renoir				Assistant director (Uncredited) (Note: Unaccredited role)
1960	Our Children will Know Each Other Better ^{†}	English	Harisadhan Dasgupta		Yes		
1960	The Tidal Bore ^{†}	English	Vijaya Mulay				Narrator
1961	The Story of Tata Steel ^{#}	English	Harisadhan Dasgupta		Yes		
1963	Creative Artists of India: Satyajit Ray ^{†}	English	B.D. Garga		Yes		Narrator
1965	Shakespeare Wallah	English	James Ivory	Yes			
1967	Glimpses of West Bengal	English	Bansi Chandragupta	Yes			
1967	Quest for Health ^{#}	English	Harisadhan Dasgupta	Yes			
1969	House that Never Dies	English	Tony Meyer	Yes			
1970	Baksa Badal	Bengali	Nityananda Datta	Yes	Yes		
1970	Gangasagar Mela	Bengali	Bansi Chandragupta	Yes			
1973	Max Mueller	English	Jorn Thiel	Yes			Narrator
1974	Darjeeling: Himalayan Fantasy	English	Bansi Chandragupta	Yes			
1978	The Brave Do Not Die ^{†}	English	Harisadhan Dasgupta		Yes		
1983	Phatik Chand	Bengali	Sandip Ray	Yes	Yes	Yes	
1983	The Music of Satyajit Ray ^{†}	English	Utpalendu Chakrabarty	Yes			Illustrator
1985–86	Satyajit Ray Presents I ^{§}	Bengali	Ray	Yes	Yes	Yes	
1986–87	Satyajit Ray Presents II^{§}	Bengali	Ray	Yes	Yes	Yes	
1986	Kissa Kathmandu Ka ^{§}	Hindi	Sandip Ray			Yes	
1991	Goopy Bagha Phire Elo	Bengali	Sandip Ray	Yes		Yes	Lyricist
1994	Uttoran	Bengali	Sandip Ray		Yes	Yes	
1995	Target	Bengali	Sandip Ray		Yes	Yes	
1996	Baksho Rahashya (Note: Based on a short story named Baksho Rahashya by Ray.)	Bengali	Sandip Ray			Yes	
1996–97	Feluda 30 ^{§}	Bengali	Sandip Ray			Yes	
1998	Parvaz-e zanbur	Tajik	• Boung-hun Min • Jamshed Usmonov	Yes (Note: Featured music)			
1999	Satyajiter Gappo ^{§}	Bengali	Sandip Ray			Yes	
2000	Dr. Munshir Diary ^{§}	Bengali	Sandip Ray			Yes	
2001	Satyajiter Priyo Galpo ^{§}	Bengali	Sandip Ray			Yes	
2001	Eker Pithe Dui ^{§}	Bengali	Sandip Ray			Yes	
2003	Bombaiyer Bombete (Note: Based on a novel named Bombaiyer Bombete by Ray.)	Bengali	Sandip Ray			Yes	
2006	Bankubabur Bandhu (Note: Based on a science fiction short story named Bankubabur Bandhu by Ray.)	Bengali	Kaushik Sen			Yes	
2007	The Darjeeling Limited	English	Wes Anderson	Yes (Note: Reused five of Ray's previous compositions from the films; Teen Kanya (1961), Charulata (1964), Shakespeare Wallah (1965), Baksa Badal (1970) and Joi Baba Felunath (1979))			
2007	Kailashey Kelenkari (Note: Based on a novel: Kailashey Kelenkari by Ray.)	Bengali	{ Sandip Ray			Yes	
2008	Tintorettor Jishu (Note: Based on a short story named Tintorettor Jishu by Ray.)	Bengali	Sandip Ray			Yes	
2010	Gorosthaney Sabdhan (Note: Based on a novel: Gorosthaney Sabdhan by Ray.)	Bengali	Sandip Ray			Yes	
2011	Royal Bengal Rahashya (Note: Based on a novel: Royal Bengal Rahashya by Ray.)	Bengali	Ray			Yes	
2011	Some Maana ^{‡}	Kannada	Abhishek Iyengar			Yes	
2012	Jekhane Bhooter Bhoy (Note: Based on two short stories named Brown Saheber Bari and Anath Babur Bhoy by Ray.)	Bengali	Ray			Yes	
2013	Bombay Talkies (Note: Based on a short story named Patol Babu, Film Star by Ray.)	Hindi	Dibakar Banerjee			Yes	
2014	Goopi Gawaiya Bagha Bajaiya	Hindi	Shilpa Ranade			Yes	
2014	Chaar (Note: Based on two short stories named Kagtarua and Dui Bondhu by Ray.)	Bengali	Sandip Ray			Yes	
2014	Badshahi Angti (Note: Based on a novel: Badshahi Angti by Ray.)	Bengali	Sandip Ray			Yes	
2016	Double Feluda (Note: Based on two stories: Samaddarer Chabi and Golokdham Rahasya by Ray.)	Bengali	Sandip Ray			Yes	
2017	Anukul^{‡}	Bengali	Sujoy Ghosh			Yes	
2019	Professor Shonku O El Dorado (Note: Based on a story Nakur Babu O El Dorado by Ray.)	Bengali	Sandip Ray			Yes	
2020	Feluda Pherot (Note: Based on a story Chinnomostar Obishaap by Ray.)	Bengali	Srijit Mukherjee			Yes	

== See also ==
- Satyajit Ray
- Feluda
- Professor Shonku
- Bengali Science Fiction
