= Bengal Film Journalists' Association – Best Films =

Indian film award

Here is a list of the Best Indian Films in specified languages as voted by Bengal Film Journalists' Association as part of their annual awards.

For most years, the films are listed in order of merit as voted by the jury of the association.

== 1939 ==
Best Indian Film

- Manoos

Best Bengali Film

- Jiban Maran

Best Hindi Film

- Aadmi

Best Foreign Film

- Pygmalion

== 1940 ==
Best Indian Film

- Aurat

Best Bengali Film

- Doctor

Best Hindi Film

- Aurat

Best Foreign Film

- Gone With The Wind

== 1941 ==
Indian films

1. Pratisruti
2. Padosi
3. Sikandar
4. Naya Sansar
5. Khazanchi
6. Parichay
7. Punar Milan
8. Pardesi
9. Raj Nartaki
10. Nandini

Foreign films

1. Citizen Kane
2. Kitty Foyle
3. Hold Back the Dawn
4. The Letter
5. The Philadelphia Story
6. Meet John Doe
7. Blossoms in the Dust
8. The Great Dictator
9. My Life with Caroline
10. Back Street

== 1942 ==
Indian films

1. Apna Ghar
2. Garmil
3. Bondi
4. Bharat Milap
5. Saugandh
6. Doctor
7. Kunwara Baap
8. Basant
9. Shesh Uttar
10. Lagan

Foreign films

1. How Green Was My Valley
2. Fantasia
3. H. M. Pulham, Esq.
4. Ball of Fire
5. It Started With Eve
6. Suspicion
7. Two-Faced Woman
8. The Little Foxes
9. Pimpernel Smith
10. Reap The Wild Wind

== 1944 ==
Indian films

1. Ramshastri
2. Udayer Pathey
3. Shakuntala
4. Wapas
5. Sandhi
6. Parakh
7. Dasi
8. Fashion
9. Chhadmabeshi
10. Zameen

Foreign films

1. The Song of Bernadette
2. Madam Curie
3. Since You Went Away
4. For Whom The Bell Tolls
5. It Happened Tomorrow
6. Constant Nymph
7. Going My Way
8. Mission to Moscow
9. Heaven Can Wait
10. Jane Eyre and The North Star

== 1945 ==
1. Bhabhi Kaal
2. Parbat Pe Apna Dera
3. Dui Purush
4. Kashinath
5. Ek Din Ka Sultan
6. Aaina
7. Din Raat
8. Mun-Ki-Jit
9. Devdasi
10. Mazdoor

Foreign films

1. Gaslight
2. The Lost Weekend
3. Arsenic and Old Lace
4. A Song to Remember
5. Wilson
6. A Thousand And One Nights
7. Henry V
8. Dragon Seed
9. The Seventh Cross
10. The Picture of Dorian Gray

== 1961 ==
Indian films

1. Teen Kanya
2. Gunga Jumna
3. Punasha
4. Madhya Rater Tara
5. Saptapadi
6. Kanoon
7. Char Diwari
8. Usne Kaha Tha
9. Jis Desh Men Ganga Behti Hai
10. Swayambara

Foreign films

1. Ben-Hur
2. Apartment
3. Kanał
4. Devochka Ishchet Otsa
5. The Millionairess
6. On The Beach
7. South Pacific
8. Pepe
9. The Singer Not the Song
10. Elmer Gantry

== 1962 ==
Indian films

1. Abhijan
2. Kanchanjangha
3. Kancher Swarga
4. Dada Thakur
5. Sahib Bibi Aur Ghulam
6. Bhagini Nivedita
7. Sautela Bhai
8. Hansuli Banker Upakatha
9. Arati
10. Benarasi

Foreign films

1. Two Women
2. The Naked Island
3. Ballad of a Soldier
4. Come September
5. The Guns of Navarone
6. The Longest Day
7. Spartacus
8. La Dolce Vita
9. Sleeping Beauty
10. Psycho

== 1963 ==
Indian Films

1. Mahanagar
2. Nirjan Saikate
3. Bandini
4. Saat Pake Bandha
5. Palatak
6. Uttar Falguni
7. Gumrah
8. Nisithe
9. Chhaya Surya
10. Dil Ek Mandir

Foreign films

1. The Birds
2. Judgment at Nuremberg
3. The World of Suzie Wong
4. The Cranes Are Flying
5. Can-Can
6. To Kill a Mockingbird
7. The Loudest Whisper
8. The V.I.P.s
9. El Cid
10. A Very Private Affair

== 1964 ==
Indian films

1. Charulata
2. Arohi
3. Dosti
4. Shehar Aur Sapna
5. Pratinidhi
6. Jotugriha
7. Anushtup Chanda
8. Door Gagan Ki Chhaon Men
9. Jiban Kahini
10. Sangam

Foreign films

1. The Night of the Iguana
2. West Side Story
3. Parent Trap
4. The Condemned of Altona
5. Lilies of the Field
6. Charade
7. Five Miles to Midnight
8. Hatari!
9. Leopard
10. Hud

== 1965 ==
Indian films

1. Atithi
2. Subarnarekha
3. Haqeeqat
4. Eki Ange Eto Rup
5. Kapurush o Mahapurush
6. Raja Ram Mohan
7. Baksho Badal
8. Akash Kusum
9. Aarzoo
10. Geet Gaya Patharon Ne

Foreign films

1. My Fair Lady
2. The Visit
3. Divorce Italian Style

== 1966 ==
Indian films

1. Teesri Kasam
2. Nayak
3. Shaheed
4. Guide
5. Galpo Holeo Satti
6. Mamta
7. Kanch Kata Hirey
8. Gaban
9. Subhashchandra
10. Aasman Mahal

Foreign films

1. Lawrence of Arabia
2. Love at Twenty
3. Yesterday, Today and Tomorrow

== 1967 ==
Indian films

1. Chhuti
2. Balika Badhu
3. Anupama
4. Kedar Raja
5. Shakespeare Wallah
6. Uski Kahani
7. Aakhri Khat
8. Hatey Bazarey
9. Upkar
10. Milan

Foreign films

1. Dr. Zhivago
2. Who's Afraid of Virginia Woolf?
3. Zorba The Greek

== 1968 ==
Indian films

1. Apanjan
2. Majhli Didi
3. Chotto Jigyasa
4. Sunghursh
5. Aadmi
6. Chowringhee
7. Baghini
8. Raja Aur Runk
9. Hamraaz
10. Charan Kavi Mukundadas

Foreign films

1. The Agony and the Ecstasy
2. Fahrenheit 451
3. Lord Jim

== 1969 ==
Indian films

1. Bhuvan Shome
2. Goopy Gyne Bagha Byne
3. Aashirwad
4. Saraswatichandra
5. Anokhi Raat
6. Arogya Niketan
7. Natun Pata
8. Rahgir
9. Nannha Farishta
10. Parineeta

Foreign film

1. 2001: A Space Odyssey
2. Rosemary's Baby
3. Bonnie and Clyde

== 1970 ==
Indian films

1. Pratidwandi
2. Mera Naam Joker
3. Sagina Mahato
4. Interview
5. Samaj Ko Badal Dalo
6. Diba Ratrir Kabya
7. Satyakam
8. Safar
9. Darpan
10. Aranyer Din Ratri

Foreign films

1. Blowup
2. The Graduate
3. Blow Hot, Blow Cold

== 1971 ==
Indian films

1. Nimantran
2. Anand
3. Seemabaddha
4. Chetna
5. Sara Akash
6. Malyadan
7. Guddi
8. Ekhonee
9. Tere Mere Sapne
10. Khamoshi

Foreign films

1. Charly
2. Woodstock
3. Midnight Cowboy

== 1972 ==
Indian films

1. Anubhav
2. Phir Bhi
3. Calcutta 71
4. Pakeezah
5. Dastak
6. Bigalita Karuna Janhabi Jamuna
7. Uphaar
8. Hare Rama Hare Krishna
9. Memsaab
10. Bawarchi

Foreign film

- Summer of '42

== 1973 ==
Indian films

1. Padatik
2. Achanak
3. Streer Patra
4. Saudagar
5. Ashani Sanket
6. Koshish
7. Abhimaan
8. Shriman Prithviraj
9. Bilet Pherat
10. Parichay

Foreign film

- Zabriskie Point

== 1974 ==
Indian films

1. Ankur
2. Chorus
3. Garm Hawa
4. Rajnigandha
5. Chhenra Tamsuk
6. Sonar Kella
7. Namak Haram
8. Sujata
9. Jadubangsha
10. Phuleswari

Foreign film

- The French Connection

== 1975 ==
Indian films

1. Nishant
2. Sansar Simantey
3. Palanka
4. Aavishkar
5. Mili

Foreign film

- The Touch

== 1985 ==
Indian films

1. Paar
2. Ghare Baire
3. Paroma
4. Aashray
5. Neelkantha

Foreign film

- A Passage to India

== 1986 ==
Indian films

1. Kony
2. Atanka
3. Party
4. Ek Pal
5. Ankahiee

Foreign film

- The Killing Fields

== 1987 ==
Indian films

1. Mirch Masala
2. Debshishu
3. Chopper
4. Nagpash
5. Aaj Ka Robinhood

Foreign film

- Fanny & Alexander

== 1988 ==
Indian films

1. New Delhi Times
2. Phera
3. Pestonjee
4. Utsav
5. Madhuban

Foreign film

- The Sacrifice

== 1991 ==
Indian films

1. Ek Doctor Ki Maut
2. Astuhara
3. Mahaprithibi
4. Prahaar: The Final Attack
5. Drishti

Foreign film

- The Whales of August

== 1992 ==
Indian films

1. Agantuk
2. Shakha Proshakha
3. Goopi Bagha Phire Elo
4. Antardhan
5. Current

== 1994 ==
Indian films

Wheel Chair Silpi Sardar

== 1995 ==
Indian films

1. Mammo
2. Drohkal
3. Charachar

== 1996 ==
Indian films

1. Unishe April
2. Yuganta
3. Maachis

== 1998 ==
Best Hindi film

- Godmother

== 1999 ==
Best Hindi film

- Satya

== 2000 ==
Indian films

1. Uttara
2. Paromitar Ekdin
3. Kichchu Sanglap Kichchu Pralap

== 2001 ==
Indian films

1. Utsab
2. Dekha
3. Zubeidaa

== 2002 ==
Indian films

1. Mr. & Mrs. Iyer
2. Aamar Bhuban
3. Sanjh Batir Rupkathara

Hindi film

- The Legend of Bhagat Singh

== 2003 ==
Indian films

1. Abar Aranye
2. Chokher Bali
3. Mondo Meyer Upakhyan

Hindi film

- Munna Bhai M.B.B.S.

== 2004 ==
Indian films

1. Iti Sreekanta
2. Mahulbanir Sereng
3. Abar Asbo Phire

Hindi film

- Swades

== 2005 ==
Indian films

1. Krantikaal
2. Nishi Japan
3. Antarmahal

Hindi film

- Black

== 2005 ==
Indian films

1. Faltu
2. Dosar
3. Bhalobasar Anek Naam

Hindi film

- Lage Raho Munnabhai

== See also ==
- Bengal Film Journalists' Association Awards
- Cinema of India
