= Sikkim (disambiguation) =

Sikkim is a state of India, encompassing a former kingdom.

Sikkim may also refer to:

- Kingdom of Sikkim, the independent kingdom, which became part of India in 1975
- Sikkim (film), a documentary film about the Kingdom of Sikkim, by Satyajit Ray
- Sikkim (Lok Sabha constituency), an electoral constituency coextensive with the state
- Sikkim football team, the association football team of the kingdom and the state

== See also ==
- Sikhism
