= Bishoy Chalachchitra =

Bishoy Chalachchitra (lit. 'Speaking of Films') is a collection of writings on films by the acclaimed film director Satyajit Ray. The book is in Bengali and was published by Ananda Publishers.
