= Bengal Film Journalists' Association – Best Music Director Award =

Indian film award

Here is a list of the Bengal Film Journalists' Association Best Music Director Award winners and the films for which they won.

Year	Music Director	Film
2018	Indradeep Dasgupta; Chandradeep Goswami	Sahaj Paather Gappo
2007	Shubhayu	Tapasya
2006	Chirodeep Dasgupta	Krantikal (2005)
2005	Zubeen Garg	Shudhu Tumi (2004)
2004	Debojyoti Mishra	Chokher Bali (2003)
2003	Arghakamal Mitra	Shubho Mahorat
2002	Moloy Banerjee	Dekha (2001)
2001
2000
1999
1998
1997
1996
1995	Bappi Lahiri	Kotha Chilo
1994
1993	Satyajit Ray	Goopy Bagha Phire Elo
1992	Asim Chatterjee	Najarbandi
1991
1990
1989	Hemant Kumar	Agaman
1988	Hemanga Biswas	Lalon Fakir
1987	Hemant Kumar	Pathbhola
1986	Hemant Kumar	Bhalobasha Bhalobasha
1985
1984
1983
1982
1981
1980
1979
1978	Shyamal Mitra	Anand Ashram
1977
1976	Sudhin Dasgupta	Palanka
1975	Hemant Kumar	Phuleswari
1974	Salil Chowdhury	Marjina Abdulla
1973	Sudhin Dasgupta; Nachiketa Ghosh	Picnic; Stree
1972	Manabendra Mukhopadhyay	Jay Jayanti
1971	Tapan Sinha	Sagina Mahato
1970	Satyajit Ray	Goopy Gyne Bagha Byne
1969	Pabitra Chatterjee	Charan Kavi Mukunda Das
1968	Hemant Kumar	Balika Badhu
1967	Hemant Kumar	Manihar
1966	Ustad Bahadur Khan
1965	Satyajit Ray	Charulata
1964	Hemant Kumar	Palatak
1963	Robin Chatterjee	Mayar Sansar
1962	Hemant Kumar; Ravi Shankar	Swaralipi; Sandhyarag
1961
1960
1959
1958
1957
1956
1955
1954
1953
1952
1951
1950
1949
1948
1947
1946	Pankaj Mullick	Dui Purush
1945
1944
1943	Debaki Kumar Bose	Apna Ghar
1942

== See also ==
- Bengal Film Journalists' Association Awards
- Cinema of India
