= Pikoo =

- Title card of the film
- Directed by: Satyajit Ray
- Written by: Satyajit Ray
- Screenplay by: Satyajit Ray
- Story by: Satyajit Ray
- Based on: "Pikur Diary" by Satyajit Ray
- Produced by: Henri Fraise for France 3
- Starring: Arjun Guha Thakurta; Aparna Sen; Soven Lahiri; Promod Ganguli; Victor Banerjee
- Cinematography: Soumendu Roy
- Edited by: Dulal Dutta
- Music by: Satyajit Ray
- Release date: 1980
- Running time: 26 Minutes
- Country: India
- Language: Bengali

Pikoo is a 1980 Indian Bengali-language short film directed by Satyajit Ray for French television channel France 3. The film is based on a short story named Pikoor Diary (Pikoo's Diary), written by Ray. The film showcases a day in the life of a six-year-old child, Pikoo, in the backdrop of his mother's extramarital affair.

Satyajit Ray was approached by the freelance producer Henri Fraise to make a film. Ray said in his biography that, when Henri Fraise approached him to make a film, he briefed Ray by saying "[...] you can place your camera at your window and shoot the house next-door—we will accept that." In an interview in Cineaste, Ray stated that Pikoo is "a very complex film".

The film's script was included in the book, Original English Film Scripts Satyajit Ray, put together by Ray's son Sandip Ray and Aditinath Sarkar, an ex-CEO of Ray Society. The book also includes original scripts from Ray's other films. Elements of the film was loosely adapted into the 2015 Hindi-language film Piku by Shoojit Sircar.

== Plot ==
Ranjan (Soven Lahiri) suspects his wife Seema (Aparna Sen) is having an affair. Their son, six years old Pikoo (Arjun Guha Thakurta), is enjoying his holiday. While playing, he gets annoyed by the loud barking of the neighbour's dog. Not knowing what to do, he shouts "Hush!" and is delighted when it works. Pikoo receives a telephone call from Hitesh (Victor Banerjee) who wants to inquire about Seema. Pikoo then passes the phone to Seema, who requests that Hitesh not to come over, without giving any explanation. Pikoo shares a friendly bond with his 80-year-old bedridden grandfather, Loknath (Promod Ganguli). Pikoo secretly tells Loknath about the fights between his parents, their conversation and requests Loknath not to share this little secret with anyone.

Hitesh comes over, uninvited, and brings Pikoo a gift: a drawing book and a set of sketch-pens. Pikoo readily draws pictures and shows them to Seema and Hitesh. Seema suggests that Pikoo go to the garden and draw flowers which matches the colours of his sketch pens. Excited by the idea, Pikoo runs to the garden. Once Pikoo is gone, Seema informs Hitesh about Loknath's second heart-attack and also that Ranjan has started suspecting that she has a boyfriend. Pikoo roams around the garden and draws various flowers but wonders when he sees a white lotus in the pond. Puzzled with not having a white-coloured sketch pen, he shouts from the garden and informs Seema about not having a white-coloured sketch pen to draw it. Seema, who is now having an intimate sexual encounter with Hitesh, does not respond to Pikoo.

Pikoo then uses black-coloured sketch pen to draw the flower but a rain drop spoils his drawing and he runs inside the house. He overhears Seema and Hitesh having a fight. Now knowing how to silence others, he readily shouts "Hush!" again to see that it has worked this time as well. He runs to Loknath to show him his drawings but realizes that Loknath has died in his bed. Not knowing what to do next, Pikoo runs away and sits in the balcony to watch his ruined drawing and starts crying. The film ends when Seema opens her bedroom door and notices Pikoo sitting outside, then avoids him and makes no eye-contact.

== Credits ==
=== Cast ===
- Arjun Guha Thakurta as Pikoo
- Aparna Sen as Seema, Pikoo's mother
- Soven Lahiri as Ranjan, Pikoo's father
- Promod Ganguli as Loknath, Pikoo's grandfather
- Victor Banerjee as Hitesh, Seema's boyfriend

=== Crew ===
- Sound designer: Sujit Sarkar, Partha Bose, Gobinda Naskar
- Production designer: Bhanu Ghosh, Saibal Gupta
- Recording: Susanta Bannerji
- Art Direction: Ashoke Bose
- Sound: Robin Sen Gupta

== Restoration ==
After the Academy of Motion Picture Arts and Sciences awarded Satyajit Ray an honorary Academy Award in 1992 for his lifetime achievements, the Academy Film Archive, part of the Academy Foundation which mainly works with the objectives as "preservation, restoration, documentation, exhibition and study of motion pictures", took an initiative to restore and preserve Ray's films. Josef Lindner was appointed as a preservation officer and as of October 2010 the academy has successfully restored 19 titles. However, the academy has yet to restore Pikoo, as the information about the film could not be retrieved.
