= Nayak (1966 film) =

1966 film by Satyajit Ray

Nayak (The Hero)
- Original Indian poster
- Directed by: Satyajit Ray
- Screenplay by: Satyajit Ray
- Produced by: R. D. Banshal; Sharankumari Bansal
- Starring: Uttam Kumar; Sharmila Tagore
- Cinematography: Subrata Mitra
- Edited by: Dulal Dutta
- Music by: Satyajit Ray
- Production companies: R. D. Banshal & Co.
- Distributed by: Edward Harrison(US)
- Release dates: 6 May 1966 (India); 19 July 1974 (US)
- Running time: 117 minutes
- Country: India
- Language: Bengali

Nayak (subtitled as The Hero; Bengali pronunciation: [naːok]) is a 1966 Indian Bengali-language epic psychological drama written, scored and directed by Satyajit Ray. Produced by R. D. Bansal under the banner of R. D. B. & Co., the film stars Uttam Kumar as a matinee idol on a 24-hour train ride from Kolkata to Delhi to receive a National Award, where he ends up revealing his mistakes, insecurities, and regrets during a multi-part interview to a young journalist, played by Sharmila Tagore.

Written and filmed in 1965, Nayak is Ray's second entirely original screenplay, after Kanchenjungha (1962). Subrata Mitra handled its cinematography, while Dulal Dutta edited the film. It marks the first collaboration between Ray and Kumar, and also pairs the latter with Tagore for the second time.

== Plot ==
Arindam Mukherjee, a Bengali film star, is being given a prestigious award in Delhi. He did not plan to make the trip from Calcutta to accept it in person, but changes his mind at the last minute to try to escape from thoughts about the underperformance of his latest film at the box office and reports in the morning newspaper about an altercation he was involved in. As he is unable to get a plane ticket, he has to take an overnight train, but he is actually kind of looking forward to having more time away.

On the train, the parallel and intersecting stories of a number of the passengers play out in tandem with that of Arindam, including a business executive traveling with his wife and sick daughter, an advertising man willing to use the attentions of his lovely wife to get close to the business executive, and an elderly man who writes letters to the editor critical of the film industry and does not like that Arindam is on the train. In the train's dining car, Aditi Sengupta, the young editor of a small modern women's magazine, Adhunika, sees Arindam. Although she has a negative view of celebrities and her magazine does not usually cover film, a fellow passenger convinces her to try to interview Arindam to attract more readers, but her first attempt does not go well, as he senses her feelings of superiority and is not interested in answering her searching questions.

After taking a nap and having a nightmare, Arindam sees Aditi in the dining car again and begins to open up about his past, regrets, and insecurities. He tells her how Shankar-da, his mentor in the theatre, urged him to stay away from films, but he took his first film role almost immediately after Shankar-da died; he talks about his first day on a film set with Mukunda Lahiri, an arrogant older star, and how he refused to help get the man a job years later, when their fortunes had reversed; he tells her about Biresh, a childhood friend who became a labor activist and wanted him to use his platform as a star to help the cause, and how, to avoid controversy, he refused. Aditi does not just listen, but challenges and pushes Arindam, leading to further introspection on his part. She initially takes notes surreptitiously, but later on, out of empathy almost bordering on pity, stops. As she begins to see behind his celebrity and Arindam begins to openly question everything about his life, Aditi even defends his work to him as something that gives many people pleasure.

That night, a drunk Arindam asks the conductor to get Aditi, and, while waiting for her to arrive, contemplates jumping off the back of the train to his death. Aditi's arrival interrupts him, and he offers to complete her interview by telling her about his fight, saying he feels a need to further unburden himself, and there is no one else he can talk to. She says she does not need to hear what she has already guessed (that he had an affair with a married co-star and the fight was with the woman's husband), and then tells him that his newest movie only flopped because his heart was not in it. Concerned for Arindam, Aditi makes sure he returns to his sleeper compartment before going back to her seat, and he says she can write anything about him that she wants.

In the morning, as the train approaches Delhi, Arindam and Aditi are again reunited in the dining car. When she asks how he is, he responds by asking her to tell him, and she says he is fine and will continue to be a big star for a long time, and then tears up her notes about their interview, deciding to let the hero preserve his public image. Arindam is surrounded by reporters as soon as the train reaches the station in Delhi, and, after one last glance at Aditi as she walks away, he slips back into the role of the star.

== Cast ==
- Uttam Kumar as Arindam Mukherjee, a Bengali film star
- Sharmila Tagore as Aditi Sengupta, the editor of Modern Woman, a small magazine
- Bireswar Sen as Mukunda Lahiri, an older film star
- Somen Bose as Shankar-da, Arindam's mentor in the theatre
- Nirmal Ghosh as Jyoti Banerjee, Arindam's manager
- Premangshu Bose as Biresh, Arindam's childhood friend, a labor activist
- Sumita Sanyal as Pramila Chatterjee, an ambitious aspiring actress
- Ranjit Sen as Haren Bose, a business executive
- Bharati Devi as Manorama Bose, Haren's wife
- Lali Chowdhury as Sairindhri 'Bulbul' Bose, the Bose's daughter
- Kamu Mukherjee as Pritish Sarkar, an ad man trying to land Haren as a client
- Susmita Mukherjee as Molly Sarkar, Pritish's wife
- Subrata Sensharma as Ajoy Dev, Shefalika's husband
- Jamuna Sinha as Shefalika Devi, Ajoy's wife, who becomes friendly with Aditi on the train
- Kamal Misra as Hiralal, a film producer
- Jogesh Chatterjee as Aghore Chatterjee, an elderly man who writes letters to the editor critical of the film industry
- Satya Banerjee as a swami with the W.W.W.W. organisation
- Gopal Dey as a train conductor

== Production ==
=== Development ===
In a letter Ray wrote in 1966, he said, about the film's development:

I wanted a relationship to develop between the Matinee Idol and a girl on the train. Romance was out – the time being so short – but I wanted something with an interesting development. The transition from apathy mixed with a certain dislike, to sympathetic understanding, seemed a promising one. So I made Aditi a slightly snooty sophisticate who questions and resists the easy charm, good looks, sangfroid, etc etc. of the Idol, until she discovers there’s an area where he is helpless, lonely, and in need of guidance. From the point where he begins to unburden himself, Aditi can ignore his façade because she’s had a glimpse of what lies beneath. At first he is ‘material’ for her for a journalistic probe, until the process of unbarring reaches a point where she realizes it would be unethical to exploit it. Sympathy and desire to help is the next step. The bond between the two is tenuous, but real. Intellectually clearly above him, her goodness consists in providing him with the small area of contact that exists between them.

Ray wrote the screenplay for the film in Darjeeling, where he went during the off-season from filming. While writing, he had Uttam Kumar in mind for the lead—not as an actor, but rather as a "phenomenon". When Ray finished the script, he read it to Tapan Sinha, and said, "I would choose Uttam for this role", to which Sinha replied: "This is the perfect choice. No one else can play this role other than Uttam." Nayak was the first of two films that Ray and Kumar, two icons of Bengali Cinema, made together; they would work together once more on 1967's Chiriyakhana.

=== Casting ===
The role of Aditi was initially offered to Madhabi Mukherjee, the star of Ray's previous films Mahanagar (1963) and Charulata (1964), but Mukherjee rejected the offer for personal reasons. Only then did Ray think of Sharmila Tagore, who he had directed in her first two films years earlier, but had recently been busy filming Hindi films. According to Ray's son, Sandip, Tagore was dating cricketer Tiger Pataudi at the time of the shoot, and Pataudi would sometimes come to watch filming or pick up Tagore at the end of the day. The film's ensemble cast is composed of a mixture of well-known supporting players, such as Bharati Devi, as well as less-familiar faces.

=== Filming ===
The film was shot in the latter half of 1965. The scenes onboard the train were filmed in Studio 1 and 2 of New Theatres' Calcutta studio, where art director Bansi Chandragupta, after observing the construction of train compartments at Santragachi Junction, built a set based on the luxurious train cars of the Rajdhani Express. Images and sounds captured by Chandragupta during a train journey from Calcutta to Delhi were used for rear projection and the film's audio track, respectively. Some scenes set outside the train were shot in Howrah Station, and the scene in which Arindam disembarks to get some tea was filmed at Khanyan Station (though the shots of Aditi sitting on the train in this scene were filmed in the studio).

Shortly before making Nayak, Kumar had a bout of chickenpox that left pockmarks on his face. He was upset when Ray told him on the first day of filming that he was not going to be wearing any makeup, but Ray reassured him, saying he would not be without makeup for the entire shoot.

In the scene in which Aditi asks Arindam for an autograph, Kumar took the pen out of his pocket to sign, but it did not work. Ray was about to say "Cut", when Kumar, while continuing to say his lines, lightly shook the pen and tried to sign again. It still did not work, so he dipped the pen in the glass of water in front of him and signed successfully. Ray included this take in the film, and felt the incident shows Kumar's genuineness as an actor.

Ray was known for his perfectionism. According to Ramesh Sen, an assistant director on Nayak, even when picking out Arindam's shaving brush, which only appears onscreen in the finished film for a fraction of a second, Ray rejected 60-some options before finally selecting one.

After Kumar's death, Ray wrote: "I hardly recall any discussion with Uttam on a serious analytical level on the character he was playing. And yet he constantly surprised and delighted me with unexpected little details of action and behaviour which came from him and not from me, which were always in character and always enhanced a scene. They were so spontaneous that it seemed he produced these out of his sleeve. If there was any cogitation involved, he never spoke about it." He also said that, while he might have made some mistakes while making Nayak, Kumar did not, and every shot was achieved in one take.

== Release and reception ==
Nayak premiered at Indira Cinema Hall in Calcutta, with Kumar in attendance. Thousands of people gathered to see him, and police were employed to handle the situation.

Kumar later said that he considered Nayak one of his best films, and it gained him international recognition. When the Hollywood star Elizabeth Taylor saw the film in London, she reportedly was impressed by his performance and screen presence. For his work in Nayak, Kumar was included on Forbes India's list of the "25 Greatest Acting Performances of Indian Cinema".

=== Awards ===
1966

Berlin International Film Festival:

- Special Jury Award (won)
- Critics' Prize (UNICRIT Award) (won)
- Golden Bear for Best Film (nominated)

1967

National Film Awards:

- Best Feature Film in Bengali (won)

Bodil Awards:

- Best Non-European Film (won)

Bengal Film Journalists' Association Awards:

- Best Director – Satyajit Ray (won)
- Best Actor – Uttam Kumar (won)

== Analysis ==
The film's plot has been compared to that of Ingmar Bergman's Wild Strawberries (1957) and Federico Fellini's 8½ (1963).

In a 2018 article on Firstpost from a series about Ray's films, Bhaskar Chattopadhyay wrote about Nayak:

Satyajit Ray often used to say that he did not like making grand films, and that he would rather tell the story of the ordinary man, the man on the street. Like his films, his short stories too mirrored this preference of his – most of them describing the lives of ordinary men – all of whom were, without exception, very lonely. Why, then, did Ray decide to make Nayak (The Hero) – a film on the life of an insanely popular matinee idol, a brash, haughty young superstar riding the waves of popularity and enjoying it to the hilt? The answer is hidden in the many layers of the film itself – a film that is so rich, so deep and yet, told in such simple language that perhaps it would not be a mistake to claim that it featured among the best works of Satyajit Ray's illustrious career.

On the occasion of the 94th anniversary of Kumar's birth, Murtaza Ali Khan wrote, in an article about the film on A Potpourri of Vestiges:

In Nayak, Uttam Kumar plays Arindam Mukherjee with such poise and ease that it appears as if he is portraying his own life on the celluloid. Ray gives us a vulnerable hero hiding behind his cocky, larger-than-life façade. And, Kumar, to his credit, never misses a note during his challenging portrayal. He is well complemented by Sharmila Tagore who plays the character of Aditi to a tee. Aditi is the only person Arindam opens up to; the tantalizing conversations between the two characters offer some great food for thought. Ray uses the various interactions between the co-passengers to make us realize that the hypocrisies and follies of a star are not much different from that of an ordinary man. A few other characters in the movie merely provide a morality check.

== Preservation and restoration ==
The Academy Film Archive preserved the film in 2004.

Nayak is one of four Ray films which were digitally restored and set for a re-release in January 2014. It was screened at the 64th Berlin International Film Festival, and the re-release was a success.

== Legacy ==
The 2010 Bengali film Autograph directed by Srijit Mukherjee was made as a tribute to Nayak.
