= Satyajit Ray =

Indian filmmaker and writer (1921–1992)

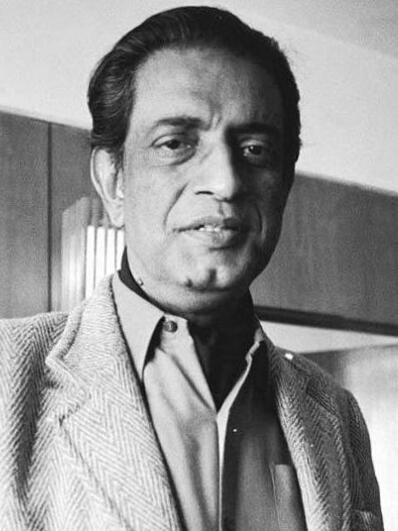
- Ray in New York, 1981
- Pronunciation: [ʃot̪ːod͡ʒit̪ rae̯]
- Born: 2 May 1921; Calcutta, Bengal Presidency, India
- Died: 23 April 1992 (aged 70); Calcutta, West Bengal, India
- Other name: Manik
- Education: Presidency College (BA); Visva-Bharati University (MA)
- Occupations: Film director; writer; illustrator; music composer; lyricist; author; essayist; calligrapher
- Years active: 1950–1992
- Works: Filmography; bibliography; calligraphy
- Spouse: Bijoya Ray (m. 1949)
- Children: Sandip Ray
- Father: Sukumar Ray
- Relatives: Upendrakishore Ray Chowdhury (grandfather); Shukhalata Rao (aunt)
- Awards: Full list
- Honors: Padma Shri (1958); Padma Bhushan (1965); Padma Vibhushan (1976); Dadasaheb Phalke Award (1984); Academy Honorary Award (1992); Commander of the Legion of Honour (1987); Bharat Ratna (1992)

Satyajit Ray (Bengali: [ʃot̪ːod͡ʒit̪ rae̯]; 2 May 1921 – 23 April 1992) was an Indian film director, screenwriter, author, lyricist, magazine editor, illustrator, calligrapher, and composer. He is widely considered to be one of the greatest and most influential film directors in the history of cinema. He is celebrated for works including The Apu Trilogy (1955–1959), The Music Room (1958), The Big City (1963), Charulata (1964), and the Goopy–Bagha trilogy (1969–1992). (Note: Satyajit Ray only directed the first two films of the trilogy (Goopy Gyne Bagha Byne, 1969, and Hirak Rajar Deshe, 1980), with his son, Sandip Ray, directing the last (Goopy Bagha Phire Elo, 1992).)

Ray was born in Calcutta to author Sukumar Ray and Suprabha Ray. Starting his career as a commercial artist, Ray was drawn into independent film-making after meeting French filmmaker Jean Renoir (who was in India to make his film The River) and viewing Vittorio De Sica's Italian neorealist film Bicycle Thieves (1948) during a visit to London. He started work on his first film after he returned from London.

Ray directed 36 films, including feature films, documentaries, and shorts. Ray's first film, Pather Panchali (1955), won eleven international prizes, including the inaugural Best Human Document award at the 1956 Cannes Film Festival. This film, along with Aparajito (1956) and Apur Sansar (The World of Apu) (1959), form The Apu Trilogy. Ray did the scripting, casting, scoring, and editing for the movie and designed his own credit titles and publicity material. He also authored several short stories and novels, primarily for young children and teenagers. Popular characters created by Ray include Feluda the sleuth and Tapshe who was described as Feluda's cousin and partner in crime, Professor Shonku the scientist, Tarini Khuro the storyteller, and Lalmohan Ganguly the novelist.

Ray received many major awards in his career, including a record thirty-seven Indian National Film Awards which includes Dadasaheb Phalke Award, a Golden Lion, a Golden Bear, two Silver Bears, many additional awards at international film festivals and ceremonies; till date remaining the only Indian to receive two out of Big Three film festivals top prizes. He received an Academy Honorary Award in 1992. In 1978, he was awarded an honorary degree by Oxford University. The Government of India honoured him with the Bharat Ratna, its highest civilian award, in 1992. On the occasion of the birth centenary of Ray, the International Film Festival of India, in recognition of the auteur's legacy, rechristened in 2021 its annual Lifetime Achievement Award to the "Satyajit Ray Lifetime Achievement Award". In 2024, Forbes ranked Ray as the 8th greatest film director (worldwide) of all time in its list of "The 30 Greatest Film Directors of All Time."

== Background, early life and career ==
=== Lineage ===
Satyajit Ray's ancestry can be traced back to at least ten generations. His family had acquired the name "Ray". Although they were Bengali Kayasthas, the Rays were "Vaishnavas" (worshippers of Vishnu), as opposed to the majority of Bengali Kayasthas, who were "Shaktos" (worshippers of the Shakti or Shiva).

The earliest-recorded ancestor of the Ray family was Ramsunder Deo (Deb), born in the middle of the sixteenth century. He was a native of Chakdah village in the Nadia district of present-day West Bengal, India, and migrated to Sherpur in East Bengal. He became son-in-law of the ruler of Jashodal (in the present day Kishoreganj District of Bangladesh) and was granted a jagir (a feudal land grant). His descendants migrated to the village Masua in Katiadi Upazila of Kishoreganj in the first half of the eighteenth century. Satyajit Ray's grandfather Upendrakishore Ray Chowdhury was born in Masua village, Kishorganj, in 1863. Upendrakishore's elder brother Saradaranjan Ray was one of the pioneers of Indian cricket and was called the W.G. Grace of India.

Upendrakishore Ray Chowdhury was a writer, illustrator, philosopher, publisher, amateur astronomer, and leader of the Brahmo Samaj, a religious and social movement in 19th-century Bengal. He set up a printing press named U. Ray and Sons.

Satyajit's father and Upendrakishore's son, Sukumar Ray, who was also born in Kishorganj, was an illustrator, critic, and a pioneering Bengali writer of nonsense rhyme (Abol Tabol) and children's literature. Social worker and children's book author Shukhalata Rao was his aunt.

=== Early life and education ===
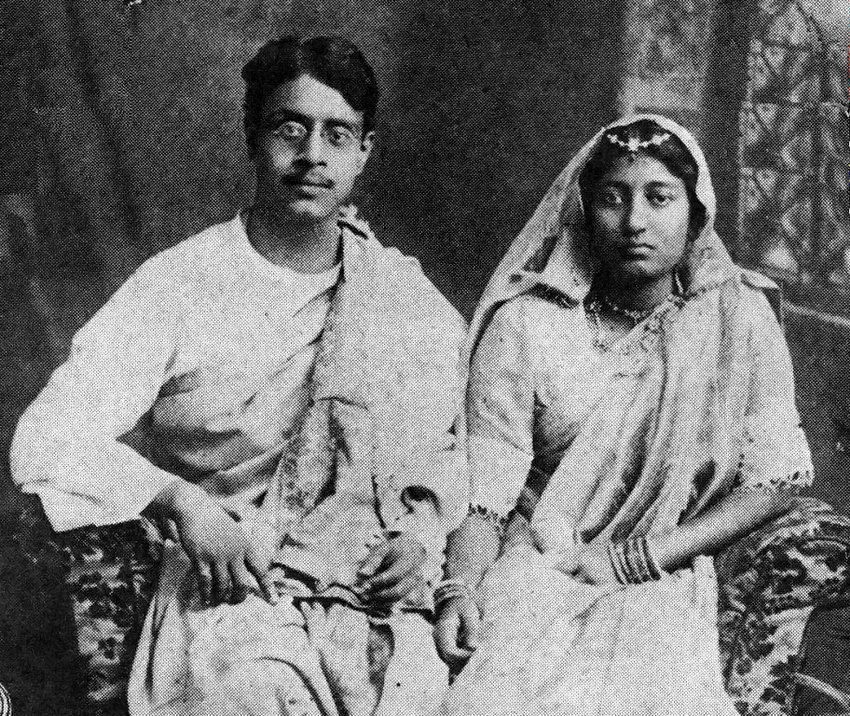
Sukumar Ray and Suprabha Ray, parents of Satyajit Ray (1914)

Satyajit Ray was born to Sukumar Ray and Suprabha Ray (née Das Gupta) in Calcutta (now Kolkata). Sukumar Ray died when Satyajit was two years old. Ray grew up in the house of his grandfather, Upendrakishore Ray Chowdhury, and of his printing press. He was attracted by the machines and process of printing from an early age and took particular interest in the production process of Sandesh, a children's magazine started by Upendrakishore.

Ray studied at Ballygunge Government High School in Calcutta, and completed his BA in economics at Presidency College, Calcutta (then affiliated with the University of Calcutta). During his school days, he saw a number of Hollywood productions in cinema. The works of Charlie Chaplin, Buster Keaton, Harold Lloyd, and Ernst Lubitsch and movies such as The Thief of Baghdad (1924) and Uncle Tom's Cabin (1927) made lasting impression on his mind. He developed a keen interest in Western classical music.

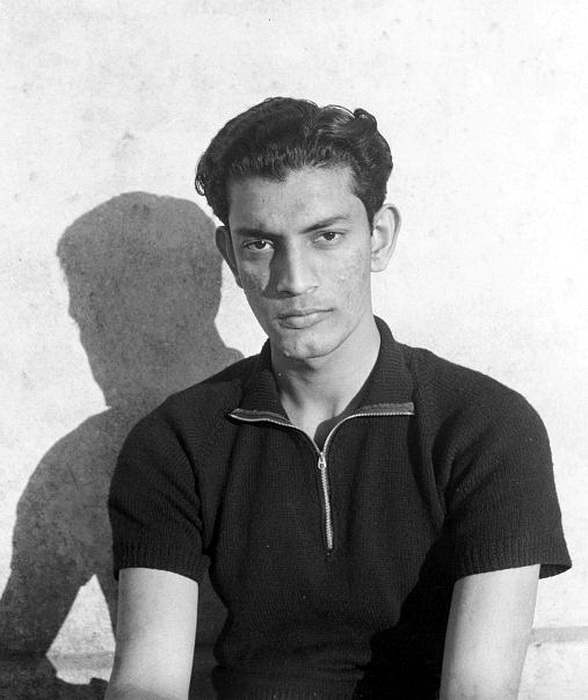
Ray in 1940

In 1940, his mother insisted that he study at Visva-Bharati University in Santiniketan, founded by writer Rabindranath Tagore. Ray was reluctant to go, due to his fondness for Calcutta and low regard for the intellectual life at Santiniketan. His mother's persuasiveness and his respect for Tagore, however, finally convinced him to get admitted there for higher studies in Fine Art. In Santiniketan, Ray came to appreciate Oriental art. He later admitted that he learned much from the Indian painters Nandalal Bose and Benode Behari Mukherjee. He later produced a documentary, The Inner Eye, about Mukherjee. His visits to the cave temples of Ajanta, Ellora, and Elephanta stimulated his admiration for Indian art. Three books that he read at the university influenced him to become a serious student of film-making: Paul Rotha's The Film Till Now and two books on theory by Rudolf Arnheim and Raymond Spottiswoode. Ray dropped out of the art course in 1942, as he could not feel inspired to become a painter.

=== Visual artist ===
In 1943, Ray started working at D.J. Keymer, a British advertising agency, as a junior visualiser. Here he was trained in Indian commercial art under artist Annada Munshi, the then-Art Director of D.J. Keymer. Although he liked visual design (graphic design) and he was mostly treated well, there was tension between the British and Indian employees of the firm. The British were better paid, and Ray felt that "the clients were generally stupid". In 1943, Ray started a second job for the Signet Press, a new publishing house started by D.K. Gupta. Gupta asked Ray to create book cover designs for the company and gave him complete artistic freedom. Ray established himself as a commercial illustrator, becoming a leading Indian typographer and book-jacket designer.

Ray designed covers for many books, including Jibanananda Das's Banalata Sen and Rupasi Bangla, Bibhutibhushan Bandyopadhyay's Chander Pahar, Jim Corbett's Maneaters of Kumaon, and Jawaharlal Nehru's Discovery of India. He worked on a children's version of Pather Panchali, a classic Bengali novel by Bandyopadhyay, renamed Aam Antir Bhepu (The Mango-Seed Whistle). Ray designed the cover and illustrated the book and was deeply influenced by the work. He used it as the subject of his first film and featured his illustrations as shots in it.

Ray befriended the American soldiers stationed in Calcutta during World War II, who kept him informed about the latest American films showing in the city. He came to know an RAF employee, Norman Clare, who shared Ray's passion for films, chess, and Western classical music. Ray was a regular in the addas (freestyle casual conversations) at Coffee House, where several intellectuals frequented. He formed lasting associations with some of his compatriots there, such as Bansi Chandragupta (celebrated art director), Kamal Kumar Majumdar (polymath and author of stylish prose), Radha Prasad Gupta, and Chidananda Das Gupta (film critic). Along with Chidananda Dasgupta and others, Ray founded the Calcutta Film Society in 1947. They screened many foreign films, many of which Ray watched and seriously studied, including several American and Russian films. The use of Indian music and dancing in the 1948 Indian film Kalpana (transl. Imagination), directed by the celebrated dancer Uday Shankar, had an impact on Ray. In 1949, Ray married Bijoya Das, his first cousin and long-time sweetheart. The couple had a son, Sandip Ray, who also became a film director. In the same year, French director Jean Renoir came to Calcutta to shoot his film The River. Ray helped him to find locations in the countryside. Ray told Renoir about his idea of filming Pather Panchali, which had long been on his mind, and Renoir encouraged him in the project.

In 1950, D.J. Keymer sent Ray to London to work at their headquarters. During his six months there, Ray watched 99 films, including Alexander Dovzhenko's Earth (1930) and Jean Renoir's The Rules of the Game (1939). However, the film that had the most profound effect on him was the neorealist film Ladri di biciclette (Bicycle Thieves) (1948) by Vittorio De Sica. Ray later said that he walked out of the theatre determined to become a filmmaker.

== Film career (1950–1982) ==
=== The Apu years (1950–1959) ===
After being "deeply moved" by Pather Panchali, the 1928 classic Bildungsroman of Bengali literature, Ray decided to adapt it for his first film. Pather Panchali is a semi-autobiographical novel describing the maturation of Apu, a small boy in a Bengal village. Pather Panchali did not have a script; it was made from Ray's drawings and notes. Before principal photography began, he created a storyboard dealing with details and continuity. Years later, he donated those drawings and notes to Cinémathèque Française. Ray gathered an inexperienced crew, although both his cameraman Subrata Mitra and art director Bansi Chandragupta would go on to achieve great acclaim. The cast consisted of mostly amateur actors. After unsuccessful attempts to persuade many producers to finance the project, Ray started shooting in late 1952 with his personal savings and hoped to raise more money once he had some footage shot, but did not succeed on his terms. As a result, Ray shot Pather Panchali over two and a half years, an unusually long period. He refused funding from sources who wanted to change the script or exercise supervision over production. He also ignored advice from the Indian government to incorporate a happy ending, but he did receive funding that allowed him to complete the film.

Monroe Wheeler, head of the department of exhibitions and publications at New York's Museum of Modern Art (MoMA), heard about the project when he visited Calcutta in 1954. He considered the incomplete footage to be of high quality and encouraged Ray to finish the film so that it could be shown at a MoMA exhibition the following year. Six months later, American director John Huston, on a visit to India for some early location scouting for The Man Who Would Be King, saw excerpts of the unfinished film and recognised "the work of a great film-maker".

With a loan from the West Bengal government, Ray finally completed the film; it was released in 1955 to critical acclaim. It earned numerous awards and had long theatrical runs in India and abroad. The Times of India wrote, "It is absurd to compare it with any other Indian cinema [...] Pather Panchali is pure cinema". In the United Kingdom, Lindsay Anderson wrote a positive review of the film. However, the film also gained negative reactions; François Truffaut was reported to have said, "I don't want to see a movie of peasants eating with their hands", a reaction he later rescinded. Bosley Crowther, then the most influential critic of The New York Times, criticised the film's loose structure and conceded that it "takes patience to be enjoyed". Edward Harrison, an American distributor, was worried that Crowther's review would dissuade audiences, but the film enjoyed an eight months theatrical run in the United States.

Ray's international career started in earnest after the success of his next film, the second in The Apu Trilogy, Aparajito (1956) (The Unvanquished). This film depicts the eternal struggle between the ambitions of a young man, Apu, and the mother who loves him. Upon release, Aparajito won the Golden Lion at the Venice Film Festival, bringing Ray considerable acclaim. In a retrospective review, Edward Guthmann of the San Francisco Chronicle praised Ray for his ability to capture emotions and blend music with storytelling to create a "flawless" picture. Critics such as Mrinal Sen and Ritwik Ghatak rank it higher than Ray's first film.

Ray directed and released two other films in 1958: the comic Parash Pathar (The Philosopher's Stone), and Jalsaghar (The Music Room), a film about the decadence of the Zamindars, considered one of his most important works. Time Out magazine gave Jalsaghar a positive review, describing it as "slow, rapt and hypnotic".

While making Aparajito, Ray had not planned a trilogy, but after he was asked about the idea in Venice, it appealed to him. He finished the last of the trilogy, Apur Sansar (The World of Apu) in 1959. Ray introduced two of his favourite actors, Soumitra Chatterjee and Sharmila Tagore, in this film. It opens with Apu living in a Calcutta house in near-poverty; he becomes involved in an unusual marriage with Aparna. The scenes of their life together form "one of the cinema's classic affirmative depictions of married life". Critics Robin Wood and Aparna Sen thought it was a major achievement to mark the end of the trilogy.

After Apur Sansar was harshly criticised by a Bengali critic, Ray wrote an article defending it. He rarely responded to critics during his filmmaking career, but also later defended his film Charulata, his personal favourite. American critic Roger Ebert summarised the trilogy as, "It is about a time, place and culture far removed from our own, and yet it connects directly and deeply with our human feelings. It is like a prayer, affirming that this is what the cinema can be, no matter how far in our cynicism we may stray".

Despite Ray's success, it had little influence on his personal life in the years to come. He continued to live with his wife and children in a rented house on Lake Avenue in South Calcutta, with his mother, uncle, and other members of his extended family. The home is currently owned by ISKCON.

=== From Devi to Charulata (1959–1964) ===
During this period, Ray made films about the British Raj period, a documentary on Tagore, a comic film (Mahapurush), and his first film from an original screenplay (Kanchenjungha). He also made a series of films that, taken together, are considered by critics among the most deeply felt portrayals of Indian women on screen.

Ray followed Apur Sansar with 1960's Devi (The Goddess), a film in which he examined the superstitions in society. Sharmila Tagore starred as Doyamoyee, a young wife who is deified by her father-in-law. Ray was worried that the Central Board of Film Certification might block his film, or at least make him re-cut it, but Devi was spared. Upon international distribution, the critic from Chicago Reader described the film as, "full of sensuality and ironic undertones".

In 1961, on the insistence of Prime Minister Jawaharlal Nehru, Ray was commissioned to make Rabindranath Tagore, based on the poet of the same name, on the occasion of his birth centennial, a tribute to the person who likely most influenced Ray. Due to limited footage of Tagore, Ray was challenged by the necessity of making the film mainly with static material. He said that it took as much work as three feature films.

In the same year, together with Subhas Mukhopadhyay and others, Ray was able to revive Sandesh, the children's magazine which his grandfather had founded. Ray had been saving money for some years to make this possible. A duality in the name (Sandesh means both "news" in Bengali and also a sweet popular dessert) set the tone of the magazine (both educational and entertaining). Ray began to make illustrations for it, as well as to write stories and essays for children, including his detective stories about Feluda and the humorous poetry collection, Toray Bandha Ghorar Dim. Writing eventually became a steady source of income.

In 1962, Ray directed Kanchenjungha. Based on his first original screenplay, it was also his first colour film. It tells the story of an upper-class family spending an afternoon in Darjeeling, a picturesque hill town in West Bengal. They try to arrange the engagement of their youngest daughter to a highly paid engineer educated in London.

Ray had first conceived shooting the film in a large mansion, but later decided to film it in the town. He used many shades of light and mist to reflect the tension in the drama. Ray noted that while his script allowed shooting to be possible under any lighting conditions, a commercial film crew in Darjeeling failed to shoot a single scene, as they only wanted to do so in sunshine. The New York Times' Bosley Crowther gave the film a mixed review; he praised Ray's "soft and relaxed" filmmaking but thought the characters were clichés.

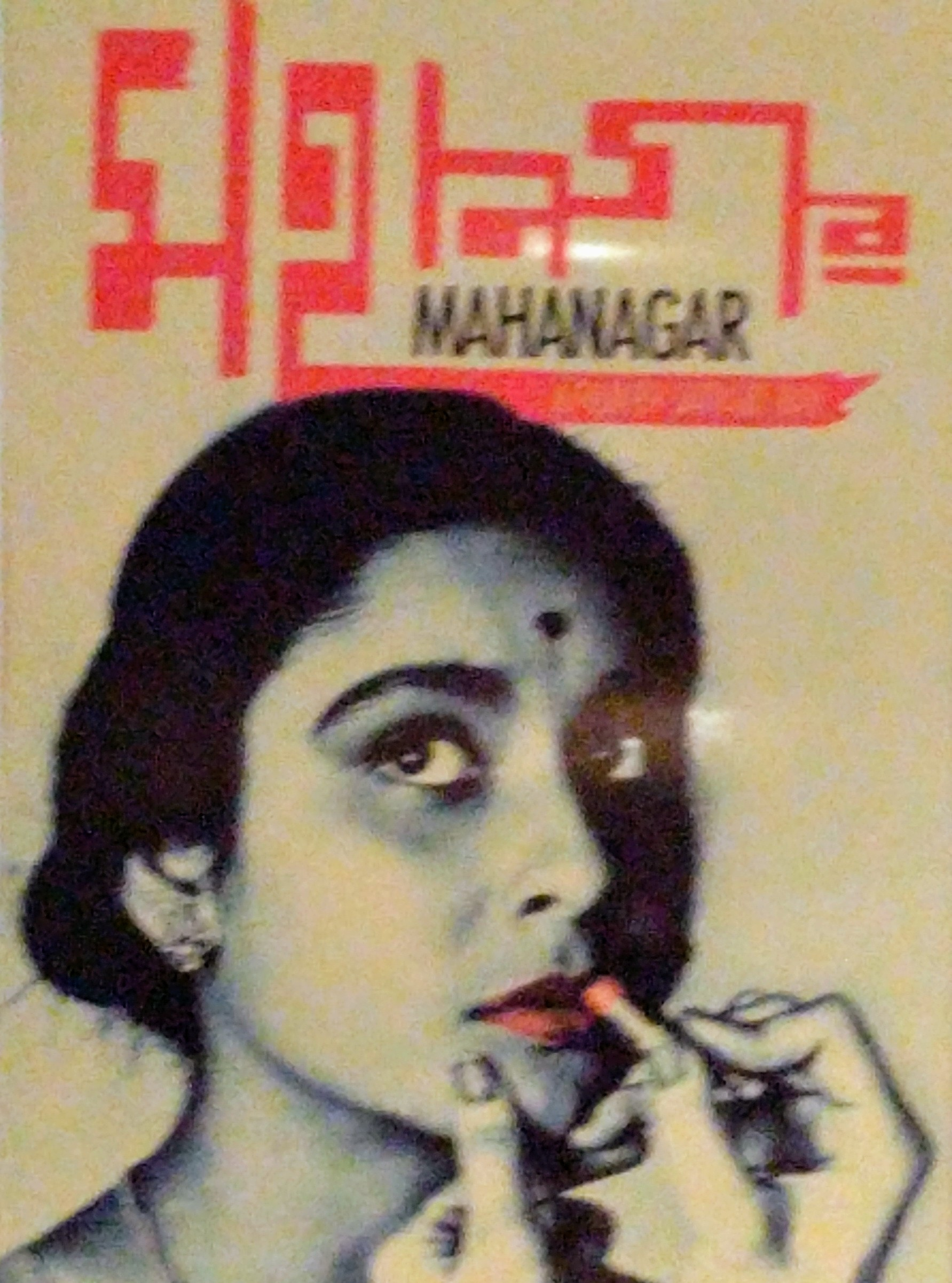
Poster for Mahanagar (1963)

In 1964, Ray directed Charulata (The Lonely Wife). One of Ray's favourite films, it was regarded by many critics as his most accomplished. Based on Tagore's short story, Nastanirh (Broken Nest), the film tells of a lonely wife, Charu, in 19th-century Bengal, and her growing feelings for her brother-in-law Amal. In retrospective reviews, The Guardian called it "extraordinarily vivid and fresh", while The Sydney Morning Herald praised Madhabi Mukherjee's casting, the film's visual style, and its camera movements. Ray said the film contained the fewest flaws among his work and it was his only work which, given a chance, he would make exactly the same way. At the 15th Berlin International Film Festival, Charulata earned him a Silver Bear for Best Director. Other films in this period include Mahanagar (The Big City), Teen Kanya (Three Daughters), Abhijan (The Expedition), Kapurush (The Coward) and Mahapurush (Holy Man). The first of these, Mahanagar, drew praise from British critics; Philip French opined that it was one of Ray's best.

Also in the 1960s, Ray visited Japan and took pleasure in meeting filmmaker Akira Kurosawa, whom he highly regarded.

=== New directions (1965–1982) ===
In the post-Charulata period, Ray took on various projects, from fantasy, science fiction, and detective stories to historical dramas. Ray also experimented during this period, exploring contemporary issues of Indian life in response to the perceived lack of these issues in his films.

The first major film in this period is 1966's Nayak (The Hero), the story of a screen hero travelling in a train and meeting a young, sympathetic female journalist. Starring Uttam Kumar and Sharmila Tagore, in the twenty-four hours of the journey, the film explores the inner conflict of the apparently highly successful matinée idol. Although the film received a "Critics Prize" at the Berlin International Film Festival, it had a generally muted reception.

In 1967, Ray wrote a script for a film to be called The Alien, based on his short story "Bankubabur Bandhu" ("Banku Babu's Friend"), which he wrote in 1962 for Sandesh magazine. It was planned to be a US and India co-production with Columbia Pictures, with Marlon Brando and Peter Sellers cast in the leading roles. Ray found that his script had been copyrighted and the fee appropriated by Mike Wilson. Wilson had initially approached Ray through their mutual friend, author Arthur C. Clarke, to represent him in Hollywood. Wilson copyrighted the script, credited to Mike Wilson & Satyajit Ray, although he contributed only one word. Ray later said that he never received compensation for the script. After Brando dropped out of the project, the producers tried to replace him with James Coburn, but Ray became disillusioned and returned to Calcutta. Columbia attempted to revive the project, without success, in the 1970s and 1980s.

In 1969, Ray directed one of his most commercially successful films, a musical fantasy based on a children's story written by his grandfather, Goopy Gyne Bagha Byne (The Adventures of Goopy and Bagha). It is about the journey of Goopy the singer and Bagha the drummer, endowed with three gifts by the King of Ghosts to stop an impending war between two neighbouring kingdoms. One of his most expensive projects, the film was also difficult to finance. Ray abandoned his desire to shoot it in colour, as he turned down an offer that would have forced him to cast a certain Hindi film actor as the lead. He also composed the songs and music for the film.

Next, Ray directed the film adaptation of a novel by the poet and writer, Sunil Gangopadhyay. Featuring a musical motif structure acclaimed as more complex than Charulata, Aranyer Din Ratri (1970) (Days and Nights in the Forest) follows four urban young men going to the forests for a vacation. They try to leave their daily lives behind, but one of them encounters women, and it becomes a deep study of the Indian middle class. First shown at the New York Film Festival in 1970, critic Pauline Kael wrote, "Satyajit Ray's films can give rise to a more complex feeling of happiness in me than the work of any other director [...] No artist has done more than Ray to make us reevaluate the commonplace". Writing for the BBC in 2002, Jamie Russell complimented the script, pacing, and mixture of emotions. According to one critic, Robin Wood, "a single sequence [of the film] ... would offer material for a short essay".

After Aranyer Din Ratri, Ray addressed contemporary Bengali life. He completed what became known as the Calcutta trilogy: Pratidwandi (1970), Seemabaddha (1971), and Jana Aranya (1975), three films that were conceived separately but had similar themes. The trilogy focuses on repression, with male protagonists encountering the forbidden. Pratidwandi (The Adversary) is about an idealist young graduate; while disillusioned by the end of film, he is still uncorrupted. Seemabaddha (Company Limited) portrays a successful man giving up his morality for further gains. Jana Aranya (The Middleman) depicts a young man giving in to the culture of corruption to earn a living. In the first film, Pratidwandi, Ray introduces new narrative techniques, such as scenes in negative, dream sequences, and abrupt flashbacks.

Also in the 1970s, Ray adapted two of his popular stories as detective films. Although mainly aimed at children and young adults, both Sonar Kella (The Golden Fortress) and Joi Baba Felunath (The Elephant God) became cult favourites. In a 2019 review of Sonar Kella, critic Rouven Linnarz was impressed with its use of Indian classical instruments to generate "mysterious progression".

Ray considered making a film on the 1971 Bangladesh Liberation War but later abandoned the idea, saying that, as a filmmaker, he was more interested in the travails of the refugees and not the politics. In 1977, Ray completed Shatranj Ke Khilari (The Chess Players), a Hindustani film based on a short story by Munshi Premchand. It was set in Lucknow in the state of Oudh, a year before the Indian Rebellion of 1857. A commentary on issues related to the colonisation of India by the British, it was Ray's first feature film in a language other than Bengali. It starred a high-profile cast including Sanjeev Kumar, Saeed Jaffrey, Amjad Khan, Shabana Azmi, Victor Bannerjee, and Richard Attenborough. Despite the film's limited budget, a The Washington Post critic gave it a positive review, writing, "He [Ray] possesses what many overindulged Hollywood filmmakers often lack: a view of history". This was Ray's only film made in Hindustani language (in elite Urdu)

In 1980, Ray made a sequel to Goopy Gyne Bagha Byne, a somewhat political Hirak Rajar Deshe (Kingdom of Diamonds). The kingdom of the evil Diamond King, or Hirok Raj, is an allusion to India during The Emergency. Along with his acclaimed short film Pikoo (Pikoo's Diary) and the hour-long Hindi film, Sadgati, this was the culmination of his work in this period.

When E.T. was released in 1982, Clarke and Ray saw similarities in the film to his earlier The Alien script; Ray claimed that E.T. plagiarised his script. Ray said that Steven Spielberg's film "would not have been possible without my script of The Alien being available throughout America in mimeographed copies". Spielberg denied any plagiarism by saying, "I was a kid in high school when this script was circulating in Hollywood". (Spielberg actually graduated high school in 1965 and released his first film in 1968). Besides The Alien, two other unrealised projects that Ray had intended to direct were adaptations of the ancient Indian epic, the Mahābhārata, and E. M. Forster's 1924 novel A Passage to India.

== Later days and death (1983–1992) ==
Ray became the first Indian to receive an Honorary Academy Award in 1992.

In 1983, while working on Ghare Baire (Home and the World), Ray suffered a heart attack; it would severely limit his productivity in the remaining nine years of his life. Ghare Baire, an adaptation of the novel of the same name, was completed in 1984 with the help of Ray's son, who served as a camera operator from then onward. It is about the dangers of fervent nationalism; he wrote the first draft of a script for it in the 1940s. Despite rough patches due to Ray's illness, the film did receive some acclaim; critic Vincent Canby gave the film a maximum rating of five stars and praised the performances of the three lead actors. It also featured the first kiss scene portrayed in Ray's films.

In 1987, Ray recovered to an extent to direct the 1990 film Shakha Proshakha (Branches of the Tree). It depicts an old man, who has lived a life of honesty, and learns of the corruption of three of his sons. The final scene shows the father finding solace only in the companionship of his fourth son, who is uncorrupted but mentally ill due to a head injury sustained while he was studying in England.

Ray's last film, Agantuk (The Stranger), is lighter in mood but not in theme; when a long-lost uncle arrives to visit his niece in Calcutta, he arouses suspicion as to his motive. It provokes far-ranging questions in the film about civilisation. Critic Hal Hinson was impressed, and thought Agantuk shows "all the virtues of a master artist in full maturity".

A heavy smoker but non-drinker, Ray valued work more than anything else. He would work 12 hours a day, and go to bed at two o'clock in the morning. He also enjoyed collecting antiques, manuscripts, rare gramophone records, paintings, and rare books. He was an atheist.

In 1992, Ray's health deteriorated due to heart complications. He was admitted to a hospital but never recovered. Twenty-four days before his death, Ray was presented with an Honorary Academy Award by Audrey Hepburn via video-link; he was in gravely ill condition, but gave an acceptance speech, calling it the "best achievement of [my] movie-making career". He died on 23 April 1992, at age 70.

== Other works ==
=== Literature ===
Ray created two popular fictional characters in Bengali children's literature—Pradosh Chandra Mitter (Mitra), alias Feluda, a sleuth, and Professor Shonku, a scientist. The Feluda stories are narrated by Tapesh Ranjan Mitra, aka Topshe, his teenage cousin, something of a Watson to Feluda's Holmes. The science fiction stories of Shonku are presented as a diary discovered after the scientist mysteriously disappeared.

Ray also wrote a collection of nonsense verse named Toray Bandha Ghorar Dim, which includes a translation of Lewis Carroll's "Jabberwocky". He wrote a collection of humorous stories of Mullah Nasiruddin in Bengali.

His short stories were published as collections of 12 stories, in which the overall title played with the word twelve (for example, Aker pitthe dui, literally "Two on top of one"). Ray's interest in puzzles and puns is reflected in his stories. Ray's short stories give full rein to his interest in the macabre, suspense, and other aspects that he avoided in film, making for an interesting psychological study. Most of his writings have been translated into English. Most of his screenplays have been published in Bengali in the literary journal Eksan. Ray wrote an autobiography about his childhood years, Jakhan Choto Chilam (1982), translated to English as Childhood Days: A Memoir by his wife Bijoya Ray. In 1994, Ray published his memoir, My Years with Apu, about his experiences of making The Apu Trilogy.

He also wrote essays on film, published as the collections Our Films, Their Films (1976), Bishoy Chalachchitra (1976), and Ekei Bole Shooting (1979). During the mid-1990s, Ray's film essays and an anthology of short stories were also published in English in the West. Our Films, Their Films is an anthology of film criticism by Ray. The book contains articles and personal journal excerpts. The book is presented in two sections, first discussing Indian film before turning its attention toward Hollywood, specific filmmakers (e.g., Charlie Chaplin and Akira Kurosawa), and movements such as Italian neorealism. His book Bishoy Chalachchitra was published in English translation in 2006 as Speaking of Films. It contains a compact description of his philosophy of different aspects of the cinemas.

=== Calligraphy and design ===
Ray designed four typefaces for roman script named Ray Roman, Ray Bizarre, Daphnis, and Holiday script, apart from numerous Bengali ones for Sandesh magazine. Ray Roman and Ray Bizarre won an international competition in 1971.

In certain circles of Calcutta, Ray continued to be known as an eminent graphic designer, well into his film career. Ray illustrated all his books and designed covers for them, as well as creating all publicity material for his films. For example, Ray's artistic experimentation with Bengali graphemes is highlighted in his cine posters and cine promo-brochures' covers. He also designed covers of several books by other authors. His calligraphic technique reflects the deep impact of (a) the artistic pattern of European musical staff notation in the graphemic syntagms and (b) alpana, "ritual painting" mainly practised by Bengali women at the time of religious festivals (the term means "to coat with").

Thus, the verisimilar division between classical and folk art is blurred in Ray's representation of Bengali graphemes. The three-tier X-height of Bengali graphemes was presented in a manner of musical map, and the contours, curves in between horizontal and vertical meeting-point, follow the patterns of alpana. Some have noted Ray's metamorphosis of graphemes (possibly a form of "Archewriting") as a living object/subject in his positive manipulation of Bengali graphemes.

As a graphic designer, Ray designed most of his film posters, combining folk art and calligraphy to create themes ranging from mysterious and surreal to comical; an exhibition for his posters was held at the British Film Institute in 2013. He would master every style of visual art, and could mimic any painter, as evidenced in his book and magazine covers, posters, literary illustrations, and advertisement campaigns.

== Filmmaking style and influences ==
Ray subconsciously paid tribute throughout his career to French director Jean Renoir, who influenced him greatly. He also acknowledged Italian director Vittorio De Sica as an important influence, whom he thought represented Italian Neorealism best, and who taught him how to cram cinematic details into a single shot and how to use amateur actors and actresses. Ray professed to have learned the craft of cinema from Old Hollywood directors such as John Ford, Billy Wilder, and Ernst Lubitsch. He had deep respect and admiration for his contemporaries Akira Kurosawa and Ingmar Bergman, whom he considered giants. Among others, he learned the use of freeze frame shots from François Truffaut, and jump cuts, fades, and dissolves from Jean-Luc Godard. Although he admired Godard's "revolutionary" early phase, he thought his later phase was "alien". Ray adored his peer Michelangelo Antonioni but hated Blowup, which he considered as having "very little inner movement". He was also impressed with Stanley Kubrick's work. Although Ray claimed to have had very little influence from Sergei Eisenstein, films such as Pather Panchali, Aparajito, Charulata, and Sadgati contain scenes which show striking uses of montage, a technique Eisenstein helped pioneer. Ray also owned sketches of Eisenstein.

Ray considered script-writing to be an integral part of direction. Initially, he refused to make a film in any language other than Bengali. In his two non-Bengali feature films, he wrote the script in English; translators adapted it into Hindustani under Ray's supervision.

Ray's eye for detail was matched by that of his art director Bansi Chandragupta. His influence on the early films was so important that Ray would always write scripts in English before creating a Bengali version, so that the non-Bengali Chandragupta would be able to read it. Subrata Mitra's cinematography garnered praise in Ray's films, although some critics thought that Mitra's eventual departure from Ray lowered its quality. Mitra stopped working for him after Nayak (1966). Mitra developed "bounce lighting", a technique to reflect light from cloth to create a diffused, realistic light, even on a set.

Ray's regular film editor was Dulal Datta, but the director usually dictated the editing while Datta did the actual work. Due to finances and Ray's meticulous planning, his films (apart from Pather Panchali) were mostly cut in-camera.

At the beginning of his career, Ray worked with Indian classical musicians, including Ravi Shankar, Vilayat Khan, and Ali Akbar Khan. He found that their first loyalty was to musical traditions, and not to his film. He obtained a greater understanding of Western classical forms, which he wanted to use for his films set in an urban milieu. Starting with Teen Kanya, Ray began to compose his own scores. Beethoven was Ray's favourite composer; Ray also went on to become a distinguished connoisseur of Western classical music in India. The narrative structure of Ray's films are represented by musical forms such as sonata, fugue, and rondo. Kanchenjunga, Nayak, and Aranyer Din Ratri are examples of this structure.

Ray cast actors from diverse backgrounds, from well-known stars to people who had never seen a film (as in Aparajito). Critics such as Robin Wood have lauded him as the best director of children, recalling memorable performances in the roles of Apu and Durga (Pather Panchali), Ratan (Postmaster), and Mukul (Sonar Kella). Depending on the actor's skill and experience, Ray varied the intensity of his direction, from virtually nothing with actors such as Utpal Dutt, to using the actor as a puppet (e.g., with Subir Banerjee as young Apu or Sharmila Tagore as Aparna).

Actors who worked for Ray trusted him but said that he could also treat incompetence with total contempt. With admiration of his cinematic style and craft, director Roger Manvell said, "In the restrained style he has adopted, Ray has become a master of technique. He takes his timing from the nature of the people and their environment; his camera is the intent, unobtrusive observer of reactions; his editing the discreet, economical transition from one value to the next". Ray credited life to be the best kind of inspiration for cinema; he said, "For a popular medium, the best kind of inspiration should derive from life and have its roots in it. No amount of technical polish can make up for artificiality of the theme and the dishonesty of treatment".

== Critical and popular responses ==
Ray's work has been described as full of humanism and universality, and of a deceptive simplicity with deep underlying complexity. The Japanese director Akira Kurosawa said, "Not to have seen the cinema of Ray means existing in the world without seeing the sun or the moon". His detractors often find his films glacially slow, moving like a "majestic snail". Some critics find his work anti-modern, criticising him for lacking the new modes of expression or experimentation found in works of Ray's contemporaries, such as Jean-Luc Godard. As Stanley Kauffmann wrote, some critics believe that Ray assumes that viewers "can be interested in a film that simply dwells in its characters, rather than one that imposes dramatic patterns on their lives". Ray said he could do nothing about the slow pace. Kurosawa defended him by saying that Ray's films were not slow; rather, "His work can be described as flowing composedly, like a big river".

Critics have often compared Ray to Anton Chekhov, Jean Renoir, Vittorio De Sica, Howard Hawks, and Mozart. The writer V. S. Naipaul compared a scene in Shatranj Ki Khiladi (The Chess Players) to a Shakespearean play, writing, "Only three hundred words are spoken but goodness! – terrific things happen". Even critics who did not like the aesthetics of Ray's films generally acknowledged his ability to encompass a whole culture with all its nuances. Ray's obituary in The Independent included the question, "Who else can compete?"

His work was promoted in France by the Studio des Ursuline cinema. French photographer Henri Cartier-Bresson described Ray as, "undoubtedly a giant in the film world". With positive admiration for most of Ray's films, American critic Roger Ebert cited The Apu Trilogy among the greatest films. American critic Vincent Canby once wrote about Ray's films, "no matter what the particular story, no matter what the social-political circumstances of the characters, the cinema of Satyajit Ray (the Apu trilogy, The Music Room, Distant Thunder and The Chess Players, among others) is so exquisitely realized that an entire world is evoked from comparatively limited details".

Praising his contribution to the world of cinema, American filmmaker Martin Scorsese said, "His work is in the company of that of living contemporaries like Ingmar Bergman, Akira Kurosawa and Federico Fellini". American filmmaker Francis Ford Coppola cited Ray as a major influence. He praised 1960's Devi, which Coppola considers as Ray's best work and a "cinematic milestone"; Coppola admitted to learning Indian cinema through Ray's works. On a trip to India, filmmaker Christopher Nolan expressed his admiration for Ray's Pather Panchali, saying, "I have had the pleasure of watching Pather Panchali recently, which I hadn't seen before. I think it is one of the best films ever made. It is an extraordinary piece of work".

Politics and ego have also influenced debate regarding Ray's work. Certain advocates of socialism claim that Ray was not "committed" to the cause of the nation's downtrodden classes, while some critics accused him of glorifying poverty in Pather Panchali and Ashani Sanket (Distant Thunder) through lyricism and aesthetics. They claim he provided no solution to conflicts in the stories and was unable to overcome his bourgeois background. During the Maoist Naxalite movements in the 1970s, agitators once came close to causing physical harm to his son, Sandip.

In early 1980, Ray was criticised by Indian M.P. and former actress Nargis Dutt, who accused Ray of "exporting poverty". She wanted him to make films that represented "Modern India". In a highly public exchange of letters during the 1960s, Ray harshly criticised the film Akash Kusum by colleague Mrinal Sen. Ray said that Sen only attacked "easy targets", for example the Bengali middle classes. That Akash Kusum bore some resemblance to Parash Pathar, a film Sen had admitted to not liking, may have played a role in fracturing their previously cordial relationship. Ray would continue to make films on this "easy target" demographic, including Pratidwandi and Jana Aranya (set during the Naxalite movement in Bengal), and the two filmmakers would continue to trade praise and criticism the rest of their careers.

== Legacy ==
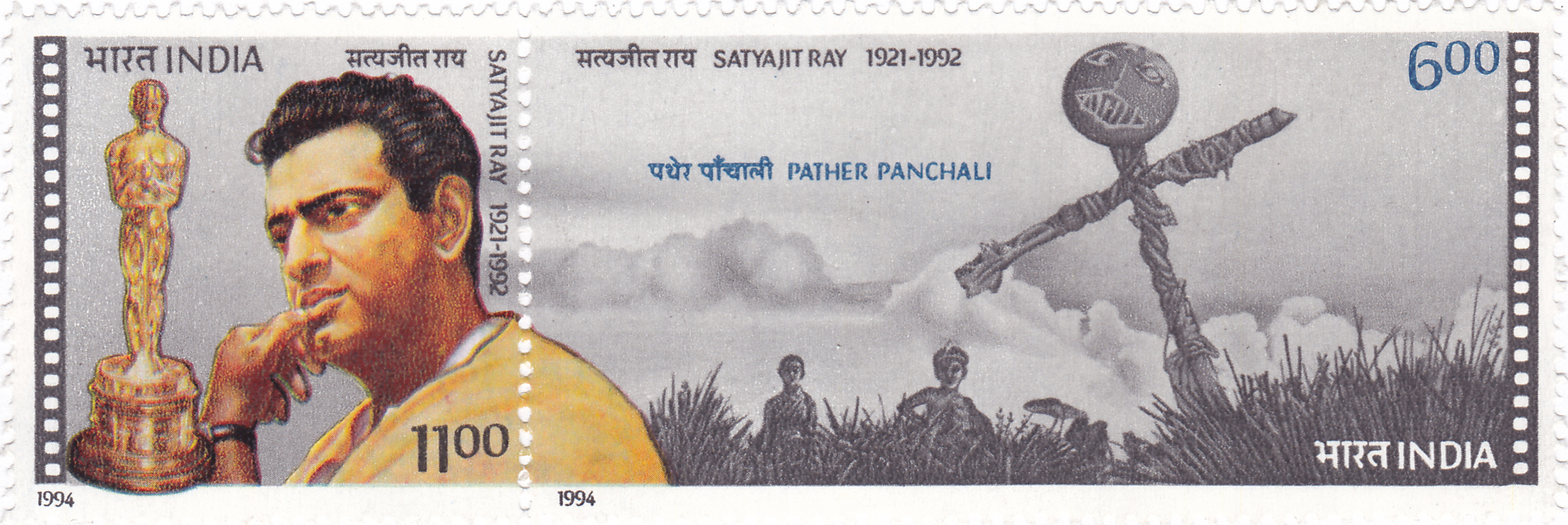
Ray on a 1994 stamp of India

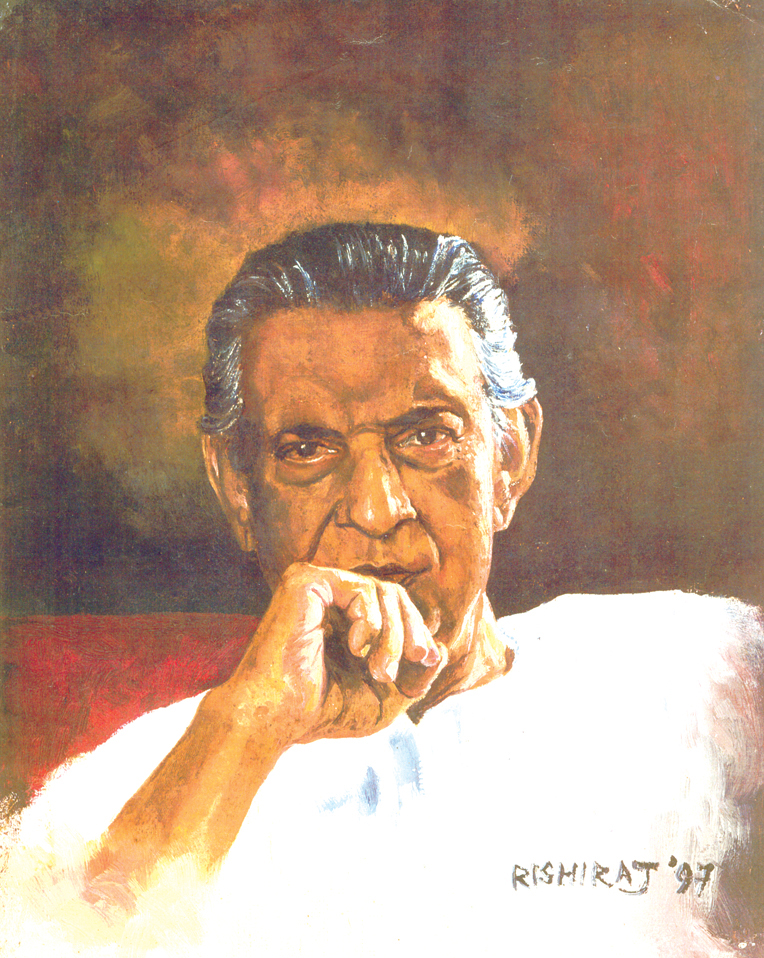
Portrait of Satyajit Ray by Rishiraj Sahoo in 1997

Ray is considered one of the greatest film directors of all time. He is a cultural icon in India and in Bengali communities worldwide. Following his death, the city of Calcutta came to a virtual standstill, as hundreds of thousands of people gathered around his house to pay their last respects. Ray's influence has been widespread and deep in Bengali cinema. Many directors, including Aparna Sen, Rituparno Ghosh, and Gautam Ghose from Bengali cinema; Vishal Bhardwaj, Dibakar Banerjee, Shyam Benegal, and Sujoy Ghosh from Hindi cinema; Tareq Masud and Tanvir Mokammel from Bangladesh; and Aneel Ahmad in England, have been influenced by his craft. Across the spectrum, filmmakers such as Buddhadeb Dasgupta, Mrinal Sen, and Adoor Gopalakrishnan have acknowledged his seminal contribution to Indian cinema. Beyond India, filmmakers Martin Scorsese, Francis Ford Coppola, George Lucas, James Ivory, Abbas Kiarostami, Elia Kazan, William Wyler, François Truffaut, John Huston, Carlos Saura, Isao Takahata, Oliver Stone, Quentin Tarantino, Wes Anderson, Danny Boyle, Christopher Nolan, and many others have been influenced by Ray's cinematic style.

Gregory Nava's 1995 film My Family had a final scene that was reminiscent of Apur Sansar. Ira Sachs's 2005 work Forty Shades of Blue was a loose remake of Charulata. Other references to Ray's films are found, for example, in 2006's Sacred Evil, and the Elements trilogy by Deepa Mehta. According to Michael Sragow of The Atlantic Monthly, the "youthful coming-of-age dramas that have flooded art houses since the mid-fifties owe a tremendous debt to The Apu Trilogy". Kanchenjungha introduced a narrative structure that resembles later hyperlink cinema. Pratidwandi helped pioneer photo-negative flashback and X-ray digression techniques. Together with Madhabi Mukherjee, Ray was the first Indian film figure to be featured on a foreign stamp (Dominica).

Iranian filmmaker Majid Majidi has expressed deep admiration for Ray. While discussing the inspiration for his first feature film on India, Beyond the Clouds (2017), Majidi said, "I have learned a lot about India based on the works of remarkable Indian director Satyajit Ray so it was my dream to make a film in his land. His view point is very valuable to me and I love whatever he has done, so one of the main reasons behind making this film is my admiration for Satyajit Ray and his work". Wes Anderson said that his 2007 film, The Darjeeling Limited, is dedicated to Ray.

Many literary works include references to Ray or his work, including Saul Bellow's Herzog and J. M. Coetzee's Youth. Salman Rushdie's Haroun and the Sea of Stories contains fish characters named Goopy and Bagha, a tribute to Ray's fantasy film. In 1993, the University of California, Santa Cruz, established the Satyajit Ray Film and Study collection, and in 1995, the Government of India set up the Satyajit Ray Film and Television Institute for studies related to film. In 2007, the BBC declared that two Feluda stories would be made into radio programs. During the London Film Festival, a regular "Satyajit Ray Award" is given to a first-time feature director whose film best captures "the artistry, compassion and humanity of Ray's vision".

A number of documentary films have been produced about Ray in India. Prominent ones include: Creative Artists of India – Satyajit Ray (1964) by Bhagwan Das Garga and Satyajit Ray (1982) by Shyam Benegal (both backed by the Government of India's Films Division), The Music of Satyajit Ray (1984) by Utpalendu Chakrabarty with funding from the National Film Development Corporation of India, and Ray: Life and Work of Satyajit Ray (1999) by Goutam Ghose. In 2016, during the shooting of the film Double Feluda, Satyajit's son, Sandip, filmed his father's library.

On 23 February 2021 on the year of Satyajit Ray's birth centenary, the Union Information and Broadcasting Minister Prakash Javadekar announced that the central government would institute an award in the name of Satyajit Ray. The award is to be on par with the Dadasaheb Phalke Award.

=== Preservation ===
The Academy Film Archive has preserved many of Ray's films, including Abhijan in 2001, Aparajito in 1996, Apur Sansar in 1996, Charulata in 1996, Devi in 1996, Goopy Gyne Bagha Byne in 2003, Jalsaghar in 1996, Jana Aranya in 1996, Joi Baba Felunath in 2007, Kapurush in 2005, Mahanagar in 1996, Mahapurush in 2005, Nayak in 2004, Parash Pathar in 2007, Pather Panchali in 1996, Seemabaddha in 2001, Shatranj ke Khilari in 2010, Sikkim in 2007, Teen Kanya in 1996, and the short film Two in 2006. The Academy Film Archive additionally holds prints of other Ray films as part of its Satyajit Ray Collection.

=== International Film Festival of India ===
Birth centenary celebrations

In the 52nd International Film Festival of India (IIFI), on the occasion of his birth centenary, the Directorate of Film Festivals paid tribute to him through a "Special Retrospective".

Award in recognition of legacy

In recognition of the auteur's legacy, the IIFI Lifetime Achievement Award was renamed the Satyajit Ray Lifetime Achievement Award in 2021.

== Awards, honours, and recognition ==
Ray received many awards, including 36 National Film Awards by the Government of India and awards at international film festivals. He holds four Palme d'Or nominations at the Cannes Film Festival. At the 11th Moscow International Film Festival in 1979, he was awarded with the Honorable Prize for contributions to cinema. At the Berlin International Film Festival, he was one of only four filmmakers to win the Silver Bear for Best Director more than once and holds the record for the most Golden Bear nominations, with seven. At the Venice Film Festival, where he had previously won a Golden Lion for Aparajito (1956), he was awarded the Golden Lion Honorary Award in 1982. That same year, he received an honorary "Hommage à Satyajit Ray" award at the 1982 Cannes Film Festival. Ray is the second film personality after Charlie Chaplin to have been awarded an honorary doctorate by Oxford University.

Ray was awarded the Dadasaheb Phalke Award in 1985 and the Legion of Honor by the President of France in 1987. The Government of India awarded him the Padma Bhushan in 1965 and the highest civilian honour, the Bharat Ratna, shortly before his death. The Academy of Motion Picture Arts and Sciences awarded Ray an Honorary Award in 1992 for Lifetime Achievement. In 1992, he was posthumously awarded the Akira Kurosawa Award for Lifetime Achievement in Directing at the San Francisco International Film Festival; it was accepted on his behalf by actress Sharmila Tagore.

Participants in a 2004 BBC poll placed Ray No. 13 on the Greatest Bengali of all time. In 1992, the Sight & Sound Critics' Top Ten Poll ranked Ray at No. 7 in its list of "Top 10 Directors" of all time, making him the highest-ranking Asian filmmaker in the poll. In 2002, the Sight & Sound critics' and directors' poll ranked Ray at No. 22 in its list of all-time greatest directors, making him the fourth highest-ranking Asian filmmaker in the poll. In 1996, Entertainment Weekly ranked Ray at No. 25 in its "50 Greatest Directors" list. In 2007, Total Film magazine included Ray in its "100 Greatest Film Directors Ever" list. In 2022, the Sydney Film Festival showcased 10 films by Ray as an homage, and the BFI Southbank screened a complete retrospective in July.

In 2024, Forbes included Ray in its list of The 30 Greatest Film Directors Of All Time, ranking him 8th—placing him ahead of legendary filmmakers such as Federico Fellini and Orson Welles. The article praised Ray's unique cinematic voice and noted his influence on directors including Akira Kurosawa, Francis Ford Coppola, and Christopher Nolan.

== Residence ==
He lived his entire life mainly in between these apartments in Kolkata: 31 Lake Avenue (till 1959); 3 Lake Temple Road (1959–1970); 1/1 Bishop Lefroy Road (1970–1992).

== Ray family ==
Upendrakishore Ray Chowdhury	Bidhumukhi Devi
Sukumar Ray	Suprabha Ray	Sukhalata Ray	Subinoy Ray	Subimal Ray	Punyalata Chakrabarti	Shantilata
Satyajit Ray	Bijoya Ray
Sandip Ray	Lalita Ray
Souradip Ray

== See also ==
- List of Bengali-language authors (chronological)
- Parallel cinema
- List of Indian writers
- Bengali Science Fiction

== Bibliography ==
- Biswas, M, ed. (2006). Apu and after: Revisiting Ray's cinema. Seagull Books. ISBN 978-1-905422-25-8.
- Cherian, V. K. (2017). India's Film Society Movement: The Journey and Its Impact. New Delhi: SAGE Publications India. ISBN 9789385985638. OCLC 959922484.
- Cooper, D (2000). The Cinema of Satyajit Ray: Between Tradition and Modernity. Cambridge University Press. ISBN 978-0-521-62980-5.
- Dasgupta, C (1996). The cinema of Satyajit Ray. Penguin India. ISBN 978-0-14-024780-0.
- Ganguly, S (2001). Satyajit Ray: In search of the modern. Indialog. ISBN 978-81-87981-04-6.
- Y, Ishaghpour (2002). Satyajit Ray, l'Orient et l'Occident. Vol. 24 of Les essais. Différence. ISBN 978-2-7291-1401-5.
- Mitra, S (1983). "The Genius of Satyajit Ray". India Today.
- Nandy, A (1995). "Satyajit Ray's Secret Guide to Exquisite Murders". The Savage Freud and Other Essays on Possible and Retrievable Selves. Princeton University Press. ISBN 978-0-691-04410-1.
- Nyce, B (1988). Satyajit Ray: A Study of His Films. Praeger Publishers. ISBN 978-0-275-92666-3.
- Ray, S (1993). Our films, their films (3 ed.). Asia Book Corp of Amer. ISBN 978-0-86311-317-8.
- Ray, S (1994). My Years with Apu. Viking. ISBN 978-0-670-86215-3.
- Ray, Satyajit (2010). Apur Panchali (in Bengali). Ananda Publishers. ISBN 978-81-7215-367-0.
- Ray, S (2005). Speaking of films. Penguin India. ISBN 978-0-14-400026-5.
- Robinson, A (2003). Satyajit Ray: The Inner Eye: The Biography of a Master Film-Maker. I. B. Tauris. ISBN 978-1-86064-965-3.
- Robinson, Andrew (2004). Satyajit Ray : The Inner Eye : The Biography of a Master Film-maker. New Delhi: Oxford University Press. ISBN 0-19-566812-X. OCLC 57075910.
- Robinson (2005). Satyajit Ray: A Vision of Cinema. I. B. Tauris. ISBN 978-1-84511-074-1.
- Rushdie, S (1992). Imaginary Homelands. Penguin. ISBN 978-0-14-014036-1.
- Santas, Constantin (2002). Responding to film: A Text Guide for Students of Cinema Art. Rowman & Littlefield. ISBN 978-0-8304-1580-9.
- Seton, Marie (1971). Satyajit Ray: Portrait of a director. Indiana University Press. ISBN 978-0-253-16815-3.
- Wood, R (1972). The Apu trilogy. November Books Ltd. ISBN 978-0-85631-003-4.
