= Charulata =

1964 film by Satyajit Ray

- Film poster
- Directed by: Satyajit Ray
- Screenplay by: Satyajit Ray
- Based on: Nastanirh by Rabindranath Tagore
- Produced by: R. D. Bansal
- Starring: Soumitra Chatterjee; Madhabi Mukherjee; Shailen Mukherjee; Shyamal Ghoshal; Gitali Roy
- Cinematography: Subrata Mitra
- Music by: Satyajit Ray
- Production companies: R. D. Bansal & Co.
- Distributed by: Edward Harrison (US)
- Release date: 17 April 1964
- Running time: 117 minutes
- Country: India
- Language: Bengali

Charulata (Bengali: চারুলতা, [t͡ʃaɾulɔt̪a]; also known as The Lonely Wife) is a 1964 Indian drama film written and directed by Satyajit Ray. Based on Rabindranath Tagore's novella Nastanirh, it stars Soumitra Chatterjee, Madhabi Mukherjee, and Shailen Mukherjee. The film is widely regarded as one of Ray's finest works.

Both the opening and closing scenes of the film have received critical acclaim. The first scene, with minimal dialogue, depicts Charu's loneliness as she observes the outside world through binoculars. In the final scene, as Charu and her husband are about to hold hands, the screen freezes—a technique praised as a masterful use of the freeze frame in cinema.

== Plot ==
In Calcutta in 1879, at the height of the Bengali Renaissance under British rule, Charulata is the intelligent and artistic wife of Bhupati, an upper-class Bengali intellectual who edits and publishes a small political newspaper. Despite his love for Charu, Bhupati is preoccupied with politics and the freedom movement, leaving her isolated in their well-serviced home.

Bhupati tells Charu that he has invited her brother Umapada, a failed lawyer, to come manage the newspaper's finances. When he notices Charu's boredom with embroidering handkerchiefs and slippers and watching the world go by out her window, Bhupati also invites Umapada's wife, Manda, to live with them and keep Charu company. However, Manda is more domestic and traditional than Charu and offers her little intellectual stimulation.

When Amal, Bhupati's younger cousin, comes to visit after finishing college, he just wants to relax and write, but Bhupati enlists him to help proofread the newspaper, as well as investigate and nurture Charu's literary talents. Amal and Charu bond over conversations and debates about literature and poetry, and their relationship evolves into an intimate, teasing friendship. Charu makes Amal a beautiful notebook, but tells him that whatever he writes in it is only for their eyes, and not to be published.

A good offer of marriage arrives for Amal from a wealthy family in Bardhaman, and Bhupati encourages him to take it, especially since the bride's father has offered to send Amal to study law in England. Amal is momentarily tempted by the idea of seeing Europe, but then tells Bhupati that he does not want to leave India, and to ask the father to give him a month to consider the proposal. Bhupati is confused by Amal's reticence, but Charu tells him that she is sure Amal will ultimately accept.

An essay that Amal wrote in his notebook gets accepted by a magazine, and Charu responds by secretly writing something of her own and getting it published by an even more selective periodical. She shows Amal the magazine with her story in it, and, while he is reading, tells Manda that she will take over making Amal's paan and gets a pair of beautiful slippers that she has made for Amal. He is very impressed by Charu's writing and urges her to continue, but she responds by crying on his shoulder and saying she will never write again, before composing herself and leaving the room.

During a party that Bhupati throws to celebrate the victory of the Liberals in the English parliamentary elections, Umapada sneaks away. He takes money from Bhupati's safe and, telling Charu that Manda's father is sick, he and Manda flee. As the party is breaking up, Bhupati's friend Nishikanta makes an announcement to celebrate the publication of Charu's story, embarrassing and confusing Bhupati, as Charu never mentioned it to him.

The company from which Bhupati gets his paper contacts him about an overdue payment that Umapada said he made months ago, and, after being shown documentation, Bhupati realizes Umapada stole from him. Shattered, he tells Amal that he plans to shut down the newspaper, not for financial reasons, but because he has lost faith in mankind. Guilty over his growing feelings for Charu, Amal packs his things and departs, leaving behind the slippers Charu made him and a note, in which he says he has heard of a job opportunity and encourages Charu to keep writing.

Charu and Bhupati take a trip to the seashore, where she suggests he continue publishing his paper, but broaden its scope, with him and Nishikanta handling politics, and her handling cultural topics. Excited, they rush home, where they find a letter from Amal, who has been staying with a friend in Madras and says he will accept the proposal. Bhupati leaves to talk to Nishikanta, but the weather changes when he is barely out the door, so he turns back. He is shocked to find Charu tearfully crying out Amal's name and he sneaks away, but Charu hears his footsteps. After wandering aimlessly in his carriage, Bhupati returns home, and Charu invites him in. They tentatively reach out to each other, but the image freezes mid-gesture, leaving their reconciliation unresolved.

== Cast ==
- Soumitra Chatterjee as Amal Chandra Basu, Bhupati's cousin
- Madhabi Mukherjee as Charulata, Bhupati's wife
- Shailen Mukherjee as Bhupati Dutta, Charulata's husband
- Shyamal Ghoshal as Umapada, Charulata's brother
- Gitali Roy as Manda (nicknamed "Mandakini"), Umapada's wife
- Subrata Sensharma as Motilal
- Bankim Ghosh as Jagannath, the paper merchant
- Dilip Bose as Shashanka, a guest at the party
- Nilotpal Dey as Joydeb, the singer at the party
- Bholanath Koyal as Braja, the servant
- Kamu Mukherjee as a guest at the party
- Suku Mukherjee as Nishikanta, Bhupati's friend

== Production ==
Charulata is based on the 1901 novella Nastanirh (The Broken Nest) by Bengali author Rabindranath Tagore. Ray later said that he liked the novella because "it has a western quality to it and the film obviously shares that quality. That's why I can speak of Mozart in connection with Charulata quite validly."

On the occasion of the birth centenary of Ray, senior journalist B.M. Hanif of Prajavani newspaper reported that speculations were rife at the time of the film's release that the story was based on the lives of Rabindranath Tagore, his brother Jyotirindranath Tagore (who was 12 years older than Rabindranath), and his sister-in-law Kadambari Devi (who was two years older than Rabindranath), considering the fact that the story takes place in 1879–1880 (when Rabindranath was 19 years old), and that Devi committed suicide in April 1884, four months after Rabindranath was married (at the age of 23) to the 9- or 11-year-old Mrinalini Devi.

Ray spent many months researching the film's historical setting, working for the first time in his career without a deadline for either pre-production or the shoot. None of the film's interior scenes were shot on location, and Ray worked closely with art director Bansi Chandragupta to build or remodel all of the sets to accurately portray India in the 1880s. Ray once called Charulata his favourite of his films.

== Music ==
The Rabindra Sangeet "Aami Chini Go Chini Tomarey" was sung for the film by Kishore Kumar, this being the first Rabindra Sangeet sung by him. The recording was done in Bombay, rather than in Calcutta. Kumar did not charge any money for his work on Charulata, nor did he for his work on Ray's 1984 film Ghare Baire.

== Reception ==
On the review aggregator website Rotten Tomatoes, 93% of 29 critics' reviews of the film are positive, with an average rating of 9.2/10. It has been widely regarded as one of the great films of Indian cinema, both domestically and internationally.

Penelope Houston of Sight and Sound praised the film, stating that "the interplay of sophistication and simplicity is extraordinary". A review in The New York Times stated the film "moved like a majestic snail, as do all Ray films". In 1965, The Times remarked that the film's depiction of values seemed influenced by the English, stating that "this stratum of Indian life was more English than England". Peter Bradshaw of The Guardian called the film "extraordinarily vivid and fresh."

In the 1992 Sight & Sound critics' poll of the greatest films of all time, Charulata received 4 votes. In 2002, the film ranked 6th in the British Film Institute's critics' poll, and 7th in its user poll, of the "Top 10 Indian Films" of all time.

Charulata was awarded the Silver Bear for Best Director at the 15th Berlin International Film Festival, but, much to Ray's dismay, it was rejected by the Cannes Film Festival, a move protested by the likes of David Lean and Ingmar Bergman; reportedly, the film was also an all-time favourite of Jean-Luc Godard. However, it was later shown as part of the Cannes Classics section of the 2013 Cannes Film Festival.

=== Awards ===
Year	Award	Category	Recipient	Result
1964	Bengal Film Journalists' Association Awards	Best Indian Films	Satyajit Ray	Won
1965	Bengal Film Journalists' Association Awards	Best Director	Satyajit Ray	Won
1965	Bengal Film Journalists' Association Awards	Best Screenplay	Satyajit Ray	Won
1965	Bengal Film Journalists' Association Awards	Best Music Director	Satyajit Ray	Won
1965	Bengal Film Journalists' Association Awards	Best Actor	Shailen Mukherjee	Won
1965	Bengal Film Journalists' Association Awards	Best Actress	Madhabi Mukherjee	Won
1965	Berlin International Film Festival	Golden Bear	Satyajit Ray	Nominated
1965	Berlin International Film Festival	Silver Bear for Best Director	Satyajit Ray	Won
1965	Berlin International Film Festival	OCIC Award	Satyajit Ray	Won
1965	National Film Awards	Best Feature Film	R. D. Bansal and Satyajit Ray	Won
1968	Valladolid International Film Festival	Golden Spike	Satyajit Ray	Nominated

== Preservation ==
The Academy Film Archive preserved Charulata in 1996.

== Home media ==
In 2013, The Criterion Collection released a restored high-definition digital transfer of the film with new subtitle translations on DVD and Blu-ray.

In the United Kingdom, Charulata was 2013's ninth most-watched foreign-language film on television, with 113,600 viewers on Channel 4.

== Tribute ==
Reversal of the gaze: Charulata (Madhabi Mukherjee), sitting on her swing and looking at Amal

The film contains a famous scene in which Charu (Madhabi Mukherjee) sings Rabindranath Tagore's song "Fule Fule Dhole Dhole" on a swing while looking at Amal (Soumitra Chatterjee). The scene is referenced in the 2005 Bollywood film Parineeta during the "Soona Man Ka Aangan" song sequence. Indeed, Parineeta's Lalita (Vidya Balan) is dressed to resemble Nastanirh/Charulata's Charu. Furthermore, Parineeta is based upon the 1914 novel Parineeta by Sarat Chandra Chattopadhyay, a contemporary of Tagore who also wrote novels concerned with social reform.
