= Kapurush =

1965 film by Satyajit Ray

- DVD cover for Kapurush
- Directed by: Satyajit Ray
- Screenplay by: Satyajit Ray
- Based on: Janaiko Kapuruser Kahini by Premendra Mitra
- Produced by: R. D. Bansal and Co.
- Starring: Soumitra Chatterjee; Madhabi Mukherjee; Haradhan Bandopadhyay
- Cinematography: Soumendu Roy
- Edited by: Dulal Dutta
- Music by: Satyajit Ray
- Release date: 7 May 1965
- Running time: 74 min.
- Country: India
- Language: Bengali

Kapurush (Bengali: কাপুরুষ), English title The Coward, is a 1965 Indian drama film directed by Satyajit Ray.

== Plot ==
Amitabha Ray is a Calcutta-based scriptwriter who is driving around in the country to collect material for a film. His vehicle breaks down in a small town. A tea planter, Bimal Gupta, offers hospitality for the night, and Amitabha accepts. At Gupta's house, he is introduced to his wife Karuna. Amitabha is shocked to find her to be the girl he once loved and had let down during their student days. Unaware of their past relationship, Gupta entertains Amitabha and gets drunk.

Unable to sleep, Amitabha remembers the last time he saw Karuna. Forced to leave town with her uncle who did not approve of the relationship, Karuna came to see Amitabha, offering to sacrifice her comfortable life and educational plans to marry him. Amitabha, however, proved to be a coward (Kapurush), unwilling to make such a commitment. Back in the present, he asks for sleeping pills from Karuna, and asks if she is happy with her husband, to which she gives no definite answer.

The next morning, as per Bimal's advice, Amitabha decides to take the train instead of waiting for his vehicle to be repaired. Gupta drives him to the train station in his car, accompanied by his wife. After a picnic which the trio has on its way, Gupta falls asleep. During this time Amitabha tries to make conversation with Karuna but she doesn’t reply. As Gupta is about to wake up, Amitabha writes a note to Karuna, telling her that he still loves her and asks her to leave her husband for him and to come to the railway station later if she still cares for him assuring this time he will not disappoint her.

Gupta drops Amitabha off at the station. Amitabha falls asleep; when he awakens, he is approached by Karuna, thinking that she wants to go with him, but all she asks for is to return the sleeping pills which she gave him.

== Cast ==
- Soumitra Chatterjee as Amitabha Ray
- Madhabi Mukherjee as Karuna
- Haradhan Bandopadhyay as Bimal Gupta

== Preservation ==
The Academy Film Archive preserved Kapurush in 2005.

== Reception ==
A retrospective review deems the plot simpler than those of earlier films directed by Ray but praises "its searing humanity", calling it "one of his most poignant films".
