= Mahapurush =

1965 film by Satyajit Ray

- Poster for Mahapurush
- Directed by: Satyajit Ray
- Screenplay by: Satyajit Ray
- Based on: Birinchibaba by Rajshekhar Basu a.k.a Poroshuram
- Produced by: RDB & Co
- Starring: Charuprakash Ghosh; Satindra Bhattacharya; Rabi Ghosh; Santosh Dutta
- Cinematography: Soumendu Roy
- Edited by: Dulal Dutta
- Music by: Satyajit Ray
- Release date: 7 May 1965
- Running time: 65 minutes
- Country: India
- Language: Bengali

Mahapurush (Bengali: মহাপুরুষ, transl. The Holy Man) is a 1965 Indian film directed by Satyajit Ray, based on a short story Birinchibaba by Rajshekhar Basu a.k.a Poroshuram.

== Plot ==
After the death of his wife, Gurupada Mitra (Prasad Mukherjee), an advocate, has not been at peace. He and his daughter Buchki (Gitali Roy), meet Birinchi (Charuprakash Ghosh). Birinchi Baba claims to be ageless. He tells stories from the past; about his arguments with Plato about time, how he taught E=mc^{2} to Einstein, and was on first-name terms with Jesu (Christ) and Gautam (Buddha). Birinchi Baba has a growing band of rich devotees.

Gurupada decides to patronize the holy man and become his disciple. Daughter Buchki is disappointed with her lover Satya. To teach him a lesson, she tells Satya that she is going to leave him and become a disciple of Birinchi Baba.

Satya turns to his friend Nibaran for his help. It does not take Nibaran long to realize that Birinchi Baba is a fraud. Nibaran and friends expose Birinchi Baba. The devotees feel foolish and perhaps have learnt a lesson.

== Cast ==
- Charuprakash Ghos as Birinchi Baba, the self-proclaimed Godman and the con-artist
- Rabi Ghosh as Birinchi Baba's assistant, his disciple/(originally) his nephew Kyabla
- Somen Bose as Nibaran da
- Satya Bandopadhyay as Nitai da
- Haridhan Mukherjee as Ganesh Mama
- Satindra Bhattacharya as Satya
- Santosh Dutta as Professor Nani
- Geetali Roy as Buchki/Neelima, Gurupada's younger daughter
- Prasad Mukherjee as Gurupada Mittir
- Renuka Roy as Nani's wife/Gurupada's elder daughter

== Preservation ==
The Academy Film Archive preserved Mahapurush in 2005.
