= Sikkim (film) =

1971 documentary by Satyajit Ray

- Directed by: Satyajit Ray
- Written by: Satyajit Ray
- Produced by: The Chogyal of Sikkim Palden Thondup Namgyal
- Narrated by: Satyajit Ray
- Cinematography: Soumendu Roy
- Edited by: Dulal Dutta
- Music by: Satyajit Ray
- Color process: Black and white
- Release date: 1971
- Running time: 60 min
- Country: India
- Language: English

Sikkim is a 1971 Indian documentary about the nation of Sikkim, directed by Satyajit Ray. The documentary was commissioned by the Chogyal (King) of Sikkim at a time when he felt the sovereignty of Sikkim was under threat from both China and India. Ray's documentary is about the sovereignty of Sikkim. The film was banned by the government of India, when Sikkim merged with India in 1975. The ban was finally lifted in September 2010. In November 2010 the director of the Kolkata film festival stated that upon screening the documentary for the first time, he received an injunction from the court of Sikkim again banning the film.

== Production ==
Satyajit had planned several documentaries about with people in their setting in focus, like musicians of Rajasthan, dancers in Ellora, but eventually ended up making only one. Ray's cousin who lived in Darjeeling, had appeared in film, Kanchenjungha (1962) also shot in Darjeeling, was acquainted with Chogyal of Sikkim Palden Thondup Namgyal and his American wife Hope Cooke, the couple commissioned the film and his cousin convinced Ray to take on the project.

== Overview ==
The documentary was screened for public viewing for the first time in 39 years at the 16th Kolkata Film Festival. Mathures Paul of The Statesman wrote in his review, "Sandwiched between Pratidwandi, Seemabaddha and Asani Sanket, Sikkim is beautiful, more an essay from a respected travel journal from Ray’s era accompanied by detailed photographs that graced magazines like Life".

== Censorship ==
The film was banned by the government of India, when Sikkim merged with India in 1975. In 2000, the copyright of the film was transferred to the Art and Culture Trust of Sikkim. The ban was finally lifted by the Ministry of External Affairs (MEA) in September 2010.

== Revival ==
Except a screening for the Chogyal family, the film never got formally released. For many years, the film was considered to be lost and it was thought that the only surviving record of the film is a scene-by-scene written reconstruction of the film by the remaining film team members. However, in January 2003 it was reported that a good quality print has been kept by the British Film Institute. When the Kolkata-based Satyajit Ray Society traced a print with the Chogyal's family it was found to be damaged beyond repair, finally, a print that had made its way to London was traced and restored by the Academy Film Archive in 2007. A restored version was shown in 2008 during a "Ray Retrospective" at the Nantes Three Continents Film Festival in France.

After the government overturned the ban, the restored copy reached the Gangtok-based Art and Culture Trust of Sikkim in September 2010, which has earlier received the prints and right for the film in 2000.

Amidst a lot of controversies, this was finally screened at a film festival at Kolkata in Nandan in Nov 2010. People waited hours and sat on the movie hall floors to watch the single screening of this movie. This was again removed after a single show, as a Sikkim court ordered a stay on the screening of this documentary.
