= Soumitra Chatterjee filmography =

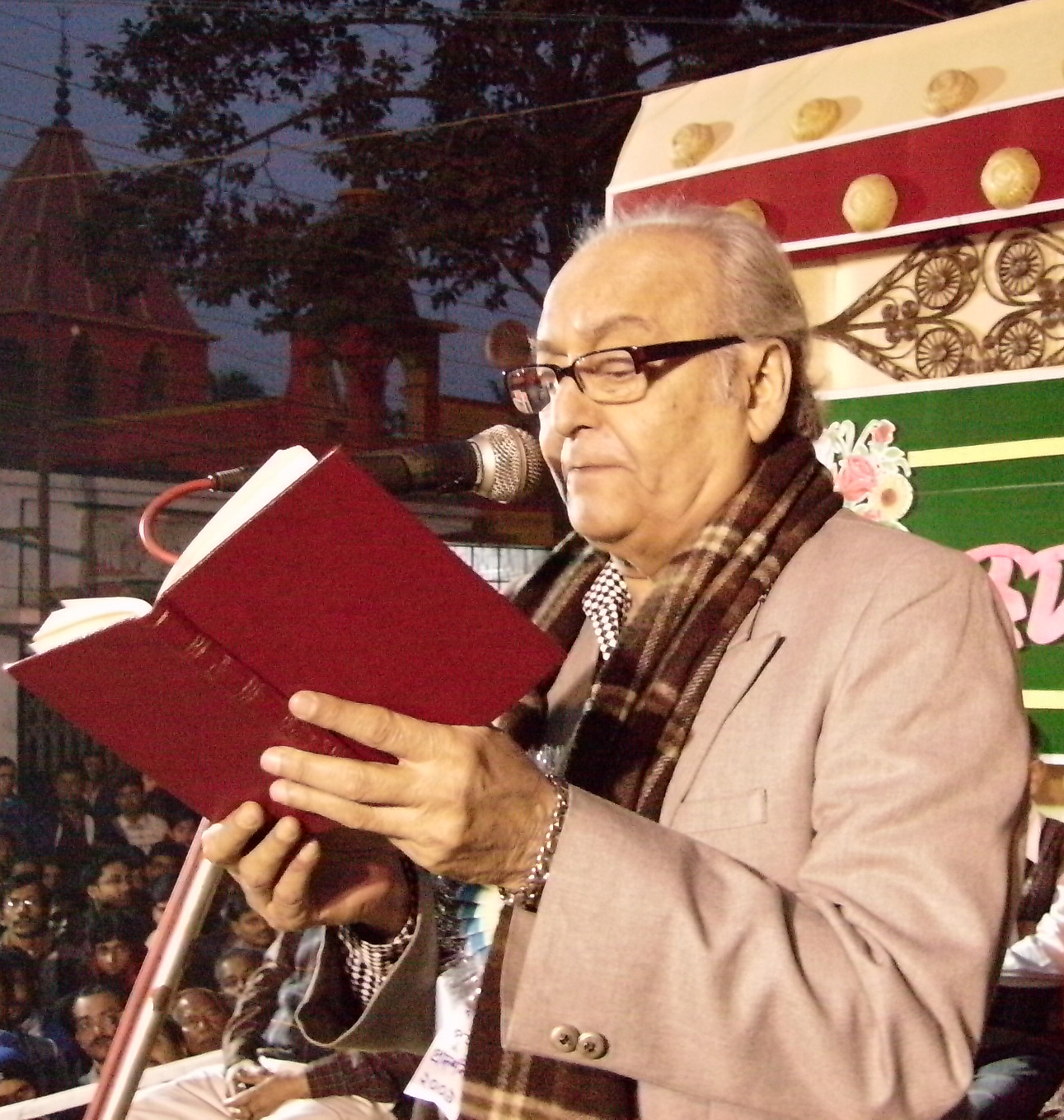
Chatterjee in 2009

Soumitra Chatterjee or Soumitra Chattopadhyay (Shoumitro Chôttopaddhae;19 January 1935 – 15 November 2020) was an Indian film and stage actor and poet. He is best known for his collaborations with Oscar-winning film director Satyajit Ray, with whom he worked in fourteen films, and his constant comparison with the Bengali cinema screen idol Uttam Kumar, his contemporary leading man of the 1960s and 1970s. Soumitra Chatterjee is also the first Indian film personality to be conferred with the Commandeur de l’ Ordre des Arts et des Lettres, France's highest award for artists. He is also the winner of the Dadasaheb Phalke Award which is India's highest award for cinema. In 2017 exactly thirty years after auteur Satyajit Ray was honoured with France's highest civilian award, the coveted Legion of Honor, thespian Soumitra Chatterjee, arguably, the most prominent face of Ray's films, also received the award.

Starting with his debut film, Apur Sansar (The World of Apu, 1959), the third part of Apu Trilogy, he went on to work in several notable films with Ray, including Abhijan (The Expedition, 1962), Charulata (The Lonely Wife, 1964), Aranyer Din Ratri (Days and Nights in the Forest, 1969); Ashani Sanket (Distant Thunder, 1973); Sonar Kella (The Fortress, 1974) as Feluda and Joi Baba Felunath (The Elephant God, 1978) as Feluda, Ghare Baire (The Home and The World, 1984) and Ganashatru (Enemy of the People, 1989). Meanwhile, he also worked with other noted directors of Bengali cinema, with Mrinal Sen in Akash Kusum (Up in the Clouds, 1965), Tapan Sinha in Kshudhita Pashan (Hungry Stones, 1960), Jhinder Bandi (1961), Asit Sen in Swaralipi (1961), Ajoy Kar in Saat Pake Bandha (1963), Parineeta (1969), and Tarun Mazumdar in Sansar Simante (1975) and Ganadevata (1978). He acted in more than 210 films in his career till 2016.

== Hindi films ==
Year	Title	Role	Note	Ref.
1986	Nirupama	Ramsundar Mitra	Telefilm based on Tagore's short story Dena Paona	
2002	Hindustani Sipahi	Yogen Chatterjee		

== Bengali films ==
Year	Title	Role	Notes	Ref.
1959	Apur Sansar	Apurba Kumar "Apu" Roy	Debut	
1960	Devi	Umaprasad Roy		
1960	Kshudhita Pashan	Tax Collector		
1961	Swaralipi	Shyamal		
1961	Teen Kanya	Amulya	BFJA Award for Best Actor	
1961	Swayambara	Pradip		
1961	Jhinder Bondi	Mayurvahan		
1961	Punashcha			
1962	Shasti			
1962	Atal Jaler Ahwan	Jayanta Chowdhury		
1962	Agun	Chandranath		
1962	Banarasi	Ratan		
1962	Abhijan	Narsingh	BFJA Award for Best Actor	
1963	Saat Pake Bandha	Prof. Sukhendu Dutta		
1963	Sesh Prohor			
1963	Barnali	Dr. Asesh		
1964	Pratinidhi	Niren		
1964	Charulata	Amal		
1964	Kinu Gowalar Gali	Indrajit		
1964	Ayananta			
1965	Baksha Badal	Dr. Pratul Bhattacharya		
1965	Ektuku Basha	Sushanta		
1965	Kapurush	Amitabha Roy		
1965	Akash Kusum	Ajay Sarkar		
1965	Eki Ange Eto Rup	Soumen		
1966	Monihar	Ajoy Chowdhury / Kumar (Note: Chatterjee played a single character with different names.)		
1966	Kanch Kata Heere	Uma		
1966	Joradighir Chowdhury Paribar	Lekhel Chowdhury		
1967	Hathat Dekha			
1967	Prastar Swakshar	Binayendra / Binu		
1967	Mahashweta	Satinath		
1967	Ajana Sapath	Manimohan Mukherjee / Soumen Roy		
1968	Parishodh			
1968	Baghini	Chiranjib	BFJA Award for Best Actor	
1969	Teen Bhubaner Pare	Montu		
1969	Parineeta	Shekhar		
1969	Chena Achena	Prabal		
1969	Aparichita	Sujitnath Dutta		
1970	Aranyer Din Ratri	Ashim Chatterjee		
1970	Aleyar Alo	Pradip		
1970	Padma Golap	Tapas Roy / Gobordhan Bhattacharya (Note: Chatterjee performed dual roles in the film.)		
1970	Pratham Kadam Phool	Sukanta Bose		
1971	Malyadan	Jatin		
1971	Khuje Berai	Shankar Banerjee		
1971	Sansar	Subhas		
1972	Aparna	Barin		
1972	Jiban Saikate	Dr. Sambit Banerjee		
1972	Stree	Sitapati	BFJA Award for Best Supporting Actor	
1973	Natun Diner Alo	Amal		
1973	Nakal Sona	Himself	Cameo	
1973	Basanta Bilap	Shyamsundar Ghosh		
1973	Nishi Kanya	Nishith		
1973	Ashani Sanket	Gangacharan Chakraborty	BFJA Award for Best Actor	
1973	Shesh Prishthay Dekhun			
1973	Bilet Pherat			
1973	Agni Bhramar	Jhintu Chowdhury		
1973	Epar Opar			
1974	Jadi Jantem	Koushik Mitra		
1974	Asati	Khokon Chowdhury		
1974	Sangini			
1974	Sonar Kella	Pradosh Chandra Mitra / Feluda		
1975	Chhutir Phande	Gitin		
1975	Sansar Simante	Aghore	Filmfare Award East for Best Actor; Also BFJA Award for Best Actor	
1975	Nishi Mrigaya	SI Manoj Roy		
1976	Sudur Niharika	Arunabha Mukherjee / Shankar Narayan / Rudra Narayan (Note: Chatterjee performed triple roles in the film.)		
1976	Datta	Naren		
1976	Nandita			
1977	Babu Moshai	Shyamal Chatterjee / Babu Moshai	Filmfare Award East for Best Actor	
1977	Mantra Mugdha	Indranath		
1977	Pratima			
1978	Pranay Pasha			
1978	Ganadevata	Debu Pandit	Filmfare Award East for Best Actor	
1978	Nadi Theke Sagare	Shyamapada		
1979	Joi Baba Felunath	Pradosh Chandra Mitra / Feluda		
1979	Devdas	Devdas Mukherjee		
1979	Job Charnaker Bibi			
1979	Noukadubi	Ramesh		
1980	Pankhiraj	Shankar		
1980	Gharer Baire Ghar			
1980	Hirak Rajar Deshe	Udayan Pandit		
1981	Pratisodh	Sanatan Chatterjee		
1981	Nyay Anyay	Shekhar		
1981	Father			
1982	Bijoyini	Priyoranjan Roy Chowdhury		
1982	Khelar Putul	Dr. Raja		
1982	Rasamoyeer Rasikata	Sashadhar		
1982	Preyashi	Sukanta		
1982	Matir Swarga			
1983	Chena Achena	Sanjoy / Prabal		
1983	Agradani	Punyo Chakraborty	Filmfare Award East for Best Actor	
1983	Indira	Amarnath		
1984	Amar Geeti	Ramnidhi Gupta / Nidhu Babu		
1984	Simantarag			
1984	Ghare Baire	Sandip Mukherjee		
1984	Lal Golap	Abhijit		
1985	Baikunther Will	Gokul Majumder		
1985	Tagori	Santu		
1985	Sandhya Pradip			
1986	Kony	Kshitish Sinha / Khidda	BFJA Award for Best Actor	
1986	Urbashi			
1986	Shyam Saheb			
1986	Achena Mukh	Subimal		
1986	Basundhara			
1986	Atanka	Sudhanshu Mukherjee / Master Moshai		
1987	Nyay Adhikar			
1987	Ekti Jiban	Gurudas Bhattacharya		
1988	Agni Sanket		BFJA Award for Best Actor	
1988	Aagoon			
1988	Debi Baran			
1988	Agaman			
1988	Pratik	Sudhanshu Mukherjee		
1989	Maryada			
1989	Shatarupa			
1989	Ghurghutiyar Ghotona	Feluda		
1989	Amar Sapath	SI Sanat Banerjee		
1990	Ganashatru	Dr. Ashok Gupta		
1990	Manasi			
1990	Ekhane Aamar Swarga			
1990	Apan Amar Apan			
1990	Ekti Jiban			
1990	Golokdham Rahasya	Feluda		
1990	Chetana			
1990	Abhimanyu			
1991	Mahaprithibi			
1991	Abhagini			
1991	Ek Pashla Brishti			
1992	Rakte Lekha			
1992	Mani Kanchan			
1992	Antardhan	Sushobhan		
1992	Shakha Proshakha	Prasanta Majumder		
1993	Mon Mane Na	Bhabatosh Bose		
1993	Puraskar			
1993	Samparka			
1993	Pasanda Pandit			
1993	Prajapati	Mr. Chatterjee		
1994	Sesh Chithi			
1994	Uttoran	Dr. Sengupta		
1994	Gajamukta			
1994	Wheel Chair			
1995	Kumari Maa			
1995	Sesh Pratiksha			
1995	Boumoni			
1995	Mashal			
1995	Kakababu Here Gelen?	Asit Dhar		
1995	Mejo Bou			
1995	Ujan			
1995	Bhagya Debata	Somnath Bhaduri	Special appearance	
1996	Sopan			
1996	Mahan			
1996	Lathi	Sadananda		
1997	Maan Apaman			
1997	Chandragrahan			
1997	Sarbajaya			
1997	Samadhan			
1997	Kalratri			
1997	Saptami			
1997	Bahurupa			
1997	Kulangar			
1998	Chowdhury Paribar			
1998	Baba Keno Chakar			
1998	Sanghat			
1998	Gharer Lakshmi			
1998	Ajab Gayer Ajab Katha	Birchandra		
1998	Putra Badhu			
1998	Lola Luci			
1999	Atmiya Sajan			
1999	Niyoti			
1999	Santan Jakhan Shatru			
1999	Sei To Abar Kachhe Ele			
1999	Asukh	Sudhamoy		
1999	Daay Dayitto	Shibatosh Bose		
1999	Kanchanmala			
1999	Shatru Mitra			
1999	Tomay Pabo Bole			
1999	Mastan Raja			
1999	Ambar Sen Antardhan Rahashya	Ambar Sen		
1999	Madhumalati			
1999	Swamir Ghar	Asit Roy		
2001	Guru Shisya	Shankar Maharaj		
2003	Abar Aranye	Ashim		
2003	Bhalo Theko	Anandi's uncle		
2003	Patalghar	Aghor Sen		
2004	Shadows of Time	Old Ravi		
2005	Nishijapon	Bimal Das		
2006	Krantikaal	Pratap Chandra Sinha	BFJA Award for Best Actor	
2006	MLA Fatakeshto			
2006	Podokkhep		National Film Award for Best Actor	
2007	Minister Fatakeshto	Chief Minister		
2007	Ballygunge Court			
2007	Krishnakanter Will			
2008	10:10	Don Durgaprasad		
2009	Angshumaner Chhobi	Pradyut		
2009	Dwando		Based on Decalogue II by Krzysztof Kieślowski	
2011	The Forlorn		Short film	
2012	Life in Park Street	Niladri		
2012	Paanch Adhyay	Hrishi-da		
2012	Hemlock Society	Cornell		
2013	Shunyo Awnko	Murphy	The Zero Act	
2013	Bicycle Kick			
2013	Rupkatha Noy		Filmfare Critics Award Bangla for Best Actor	
2014	Jara Roddure Bhijechhilo	Daroka Bhaduri		
2014	Doorbeen	Byomkesh Basu		
2015	Bela Seshe	Biswanath Majumdar		
2015	Ahalya	Goutam Sadhu		
2015	Room No. 103	Rudra Chatterjee		
2015	Birat 22			
2016	Sangabora			
2016	Praktan	Passenger in train		
2016	Bastav	Amitava Rakshit		
2016	Romantic Noy	Psychiatrist		
2016	Nosto Purush	Father		
2016	Peace Haven			
2017	Posto			
2017	The Anniversary	Ranjan Ganguly		
2017	Sesh Chithi	Shibnath		
2017	Samantaral	Sujan's father		
2017	Mayurakshi	Sushovan		
2017	Secret Love Story	Aniket		
2018	Boxer	Church Father		
2018	Kusumitar Gappo	Ratnakar Sen		
2018	Jaal	Kader Bhai		
2018	Flat No 609			
2018	Valentines Day	Tara Sankar		
2018	Shonar Pahar	Rajat		
2018	Manojder Adbhut Bari	Gobindonarayan		
2019	Jonmodin	Paresh Sengupta		
2019	Basu Poribar			
2019	Shesher Golpo	Amit Ray		
2019	Adda (2019 film)	Dhritimaan Panja		
2019	Sanjhbati	Chhana Dadu		
2019	Kolkatay Kohinoor	Satyaki Basu		
2020	Borunbabur Bondhu	Barun Babu		
2020	Sraboner Dhara	Amitava Sarkar		
2021	Abalamban	Dayal Babu		
2021	Deep6	Himself		
2021	Abhijaan	Himself		
2022	72 Ghanta	Stranger		
2022	Belashuru	Biswanath Majumdar		

== Bengali TV series ==
Year	Title	Note	Ref.
	Dena Paona		
	Kori Diye Kinlam		
	Tritoyo Purush	Bangladeshi TV Series	

== Television ==
Year	Serial	Role	Channel
2007	Sanai	Adityanarayan Choudhury	Akash Bangla
2015	Jol Nupur	Krishnendushekhar Basu Mallick	Star Jalsha

== Directorial venture ==
Year	Title	Language	Note	Ref.
1986	Stree Ki Patra	Hindi	Telefilm based on Tagore's Streer Patra	
?	Mahasindhur Opar Hote	Bengali		
