= Cinema of West Bengal =

Indian cinema

- No. of screens: 381 screens in West Bengal and Tripura states of India (2023)
- Main distributors: SVF; Eskay Movies; Surinder Films; Grassroot Entertainment; Dev Entertainment Ventures; Windows Production; Patras Glam Entertainment

Produced feature films (2023)
- Total: 145 (Theatrical)

Gross box office (2025)
- Total: ₹108 crore (US$12 million)

Cinema of West Bengal, also known as Tollywood or Bengali cinema in India, is the segment of Indian cinema, dedicated to the production of motion pictures in the Bengali language, widely spoken in the state of West Bengal and Eastern India. It is based in the Tollygunge region of Kolkata, West Bengal. The origin of the nickname "Tollywood"—a portmanteau of the words Tollygunge and Hollywood—dates back to 1932. It was a historically important film industry, at one time the centre of Indian film production. The Bengali film industry is known for producing many of Indian cinema's most critically acclaimed Parallel Cinema and art films, with several of its filmmakers gaining recognition at the Indian National Film Awards and earning international acclaim.

Bengali feature films have won the most National Film Awards with 22 wins in India. The history of Bengali cinema began in the early 20th century with the release of Billwamangal (also known as Bhagwat Gita) in 1919, which is widely regarded as the world's first Bengali film Produced by Madan Theatres and directed by Rustomji Dhotiwala, Billwamangal (1919) was a silent film and is generally regarded as the first Bengali feature film. Earlier film work in Bengal by Hiralal Sen included short actuality, advertising and recordings of theatrical performances rather than feature-length narrative films.

Ever since Satyajit Ray's Pather Panchali (1955) was awarded Best Human Document at the 1956 Cannes Film Festival, Bengali films frequently appeared in international fora and film festivals for the next several decades. This allowed Bengali filmmakers to reach a global audience. The most influential among them was Satyajit Ray, whose films became successful among European, American and Asian audiences. His work subsequently had a worldwide impact, with filmmakers such as Martin Scorsese, James Ivory, Abbas Kiarostami, Elia Kazan, François Truffaut, Carlos Saura, Isao Takahata, Wes Anderson and Danny Boyle being influenced by his cinematic style, and many others such as Akira Kurosawa praising his work.

The "youthful coming-of-age dramas that have flooded art houses since the mid-fifties owe a tremendous debt to the Apu trilogy". Kanchenjungha (1962) introduced a narrative structure that resembles later hyperlink cinema. Ray's 1967 script for a film to be called The Alien, which was eventually cancelled, is widely believed to have been the inspiration for Steven Spielberg's E.T. (1982). Ira Sachs' Forty Shades of Blue (2005) was a loose remake of Charulata (1964), and in Gregory Nava's My Family (1995), the final scene is duplicated from the final scene of The World of Apu. Similar references to Ray films are found in recent works such as Sacred Evil (2006), the Elements trilogy of Deepa Mehta, and in films of Jean-Luc Godard.

Another prominent Bengali filmmaker is Mrinal Sen, whose films have been well known for their Marxist views. During his career, Mrinal Sen's films have received awards from major film festivals, including Cannes, Berlin, Venice, Moscow, Karlovy Vary, Montreal, Chicago, and Cairo. Retrospectives of his films have been shown in major cities of the world. Bengali filmmaker Ritwik Ghatak began reaching a global audience long after his death; beginning in the 1990s, a project to restore Ghatak's films was undertaken, and international exhibitions (and subsequent DVD releases) have belatedly generated an increasingly global audience. Some of his films have strong similarities to later famous international films, such as Ajantrik (1958) resembled the Herbie films (1967–2005) and Bari Theke Paliye (1958) resembled François Truffaut's The 400 Blows (1959). Other eminent Bengali filmmakers included the trio of Tapan Sinha, Ajoy Kar and Tarun Majumdar, collectively referred as "TAT". Their films have been well known for Best Literature Adaptation and displaying larger than life perspectives. Ajoy Kar directorial numerous films created many new milestones and broke existing box office records in the Golden Era.

The cinematographer Subrata Mitra, who made his debut with Ray's The Apu Trilogy, also had an important influence on cinematography across the world. One of his most important techniques was bounce lighting, to recreate the effect of daylight on sets. He pioneered the technique while filming Aparajito (1956), the second part of The Apu Trilogy. Some of the experimental techniques which Satyajit Ray pioneered include photo-negative flashbacks and X-ray digressions while filming Pratidwandi (1972).

Following Kerala's Hema committee, similar proposal for setting up a committee in West Bengal's Tollywood has been proposed to the Chief Minister.

== Etymology ==
Tollywood was the very first Hollywood-inspired name, dating back to a 1932 article in the American Cinematographer by Wilford E. Deming, an American engineer who was involved in the production of the first Indian sound film. He gave the industry the name Tollywood because the Tollygunge district in which it was based rhymed with "Hollywood", and because Tollygunge was the centre of the cinema of India as a whole at the time much like Hollywood was in the cinema of the United States.

In that same March 1932 article, Deming was also considering the name "Hollygunge" but decided to go with "Tollywood" as the nickname for the Tollygunge area due to "Tolly being a proper name and Gunge meaning locality" in the Bengali language. It was this "chance juxtaposition of two pairs of rhyming syllables," Holly and Tolly, that led to the name "Tollywood" being coined. The name "Tollywood" went on to be used as a nickname for the Bengali film industry by the popular Kolkata-based Junior Statesman youth magazine, establishing a precedent for other film industries to use similar-sounding names. Tollywood later went on to inspire the name "Bollywood" (as the Bombay-based industry overtook the one in Tollygunge), which in turn inspired many other similar names.

== History ==
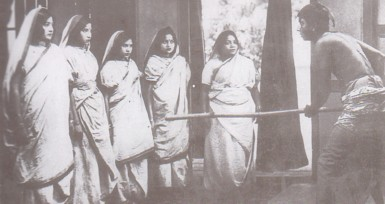
A scene from Dena Paona, 1931

The history of cinema in Bengal dates to the 1920s when the first "bioscopes" were shown in theatres in Calcutta. Within a decade, Hiralal Sen, considered a stalwart of Victorian era cinema set up the Royal Bioscope Company, producing scenes from the stage productions of a number of popular shows at the Star Theatre, Minerva Theatre, Classic Theatre. Following a long gap after Sen's works, Dhirendra Nath Ganguly (known as D.G.) established the Indo British Film Co, the first Bengali-owned production company, in 1918. However, the first Bengali feature film, Billwamangal, was produced in 1919, under the banner of Madan Theatre. Bilat Ferat was the IBFC's first production in 1921. The Madan Theatre production of Jamai Shashthi was the first Bengali talkie. A long history has been traversed since then, with stalwarts such as Satyajit Ray, Mrinal Sen, Ritwik Ghatak, Tapan Sinha, Ajoy Kar and others earning international acclaim and securing their place in the movie history.

=== Early development ===
==== Silent era (1919–1930) ====
Hiralal Sen, India is credited as one of Bengal's, and India's first directors. These were all silent films. Hiralal Sen is also credited as one of the pioneers of advertisement films in India. The first Bengali-language movie was the silent feature Billwamangal, produced by the Madan Theatre Company of Calcutta and released on 8 November 1919, only six years after the first full-length Indian feature film, Raja Harish Chandra, was released.

The early beginnings of the "talking film" industry go back to the early 1930s when it came to British India, and to Calcutta. The movies were originally made in Urdu or Persian to accommodate a specific elite market. One of the earliest known studios was the East India Film Company. The first Bengali film to be made as a talkie was Jamai Shashthi, released in 1931. At this time the early heroes of the Bengali film industry like Pramathesh Barua and Debaki Bose were at the peak of their popularity. Barua also directed movies, exploring new dimensions in Indian cinema. Debaki Bose directed Chandidas in 1932; this film is noted for its breakthrough in recording sound. Sound recordist Mukul Bose found a solution to the problem of spacing out dialogue and frequency modulation.

==== Rise of the talkie (1931–1947) ====
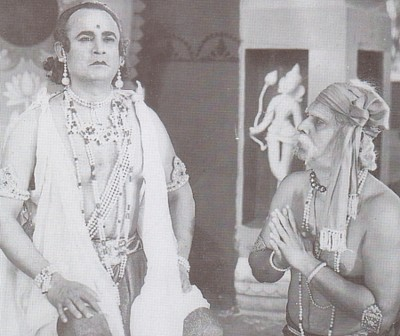
A scene from Seeta (dir: Sisir Bhaduri), 1933. Sisir Bhaduri, Amalendu Lahiri.

The Bengali film industry has made significant contributions to the cinema of India. The first Bengali talkies were the short film Jamai Shashthi released on 11 April 1931 at Crown Cinema Hall in Calcutta, and full-length feature Dena Paona released on 30 December 1931 at Chitra Cinema Hall in Calcutta. The industry was based in Tollygunge, an area of South Kolkata, West Bengal that is more elite and artistically inclined than the usual musical cinema fare in India. Kanan Devi was an early female star of Bengali film, alongside Chandrabati Devi, Molina Devi and Chhaya Devi. The most popular Bengali male actors were Sisir Bhaduri, Chhabi Biswas, Ahindra Choudhury, Dhiraj Bhattacharya and Pahari Sanyal. Popular filmmakers include Debaki Bose, Nitin Bose, Madhu Bose, Premankur Atorthy and Premendra Mitra.

=== Golden era (1952–1981) ===
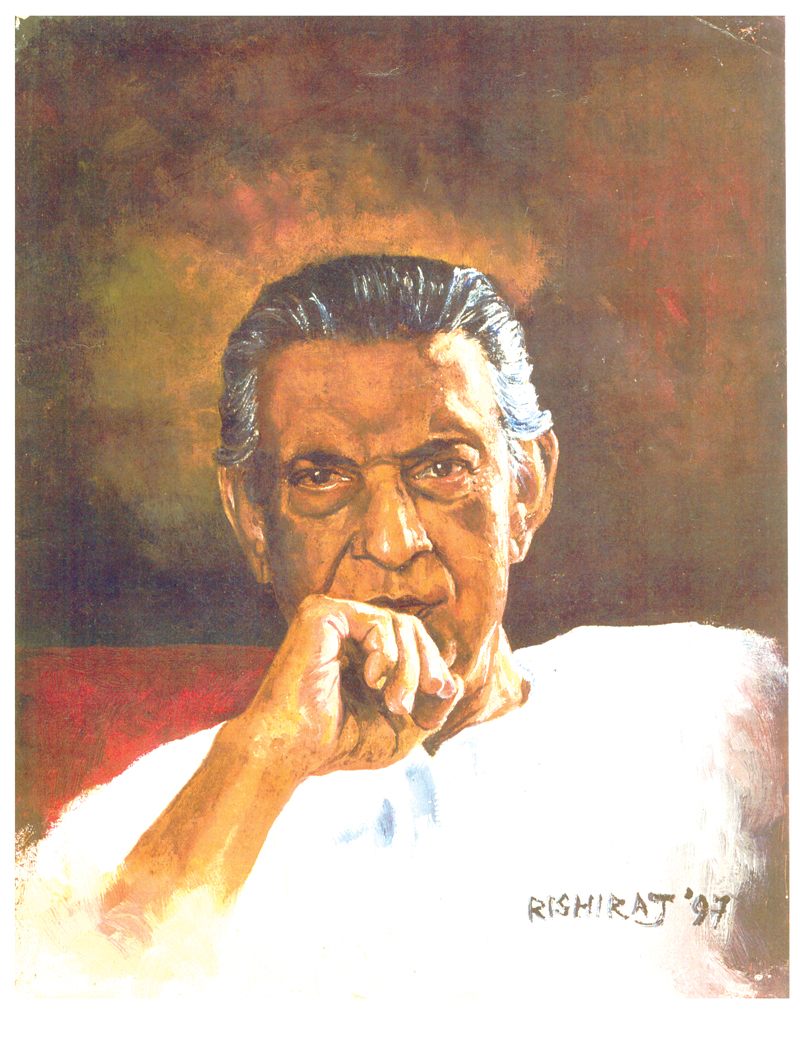
Satyajit Ray

Bengali cinema enjoyed a large, even disproportionate, representation in Indian cinema during this period. They produced directors like Ajoy Kar, Satyajit Ray, Tapan Sinha, Mrinal Sen, Tarun Majumdar, Premendra Mitra. Satyajit Ray is an Academy Honorary Award winner and the recipient of India's and France's greatest civilian honours, the Bharat Ratna and Legion of Honor respectively, and Mrinal Sen is the recipient of the French distinction of Commander of the Order of Arts and Letters and the Russian Order of Friendship. The revival in Bengali Mainstream cinema dates from the rise of directors such as Tarun Majumdar along with Arabinda Mukhopadhyay and Shakti Samanta. Other prominent filmmakers in the Bengali film industry at the time included Ritwik Ghatak, Mrinal Sen, Tapan Sinha and Ajoy Kar. The Bengali film industry has produced classics such as Nagarik (1952), The Apu Trilogy (1955–1959), Kabuliwala (1957), Jalsaghar (1958), Ajantrik (1958), Neel Akasher Neechey (1959), Devi (1960), Meghe Dhaka Tara (1960), Saptapadi (1961), Jhinder Bondi (1961), Saat Pake Bandha (1963), Jatugriha (1964), Atithi (1965), Hatey Bazarey (1967), Malyadan (1971), Nimantran (1971), Shriman Prithviraj (1973), Calcutta trilogies (1971–1976), Mrigayaa (1976), Ganadevata (1978), etc. In particular,Calcutta trilogies, The Apu Trilogy, Shriman Prithviraj, Saptapadi are frequently listed among the greatest films of all time.

The most well-known Bengali superstars to date have been Uttam Kumar and Soumitra Chatterjee.Uttam is considered the most popular and Soumitra the finest.Suchitra Sen is regarded as the most beautiful and influential actress of Bengali cinema. Kumar and Sen were known as "The Eternal Pair" in the late 1950s. This pair worked in the 1961 epic Romantic drama Saptapadi (1961 film) by Kar besides others. Suchitra Sen got her first International Award for Saat Pake Bandha (1963) by Kar. Apart from Sen, Sabitri Chatterjee and Sumitra Devi were very popular actresses.

Soumitra Chatterjee, who was considered one of the greatest actors in the history of Indian and world cinema, became a recurring face of Satyajit Ray’s works and a prominent force in Bengali cinema for over sixty years.

Beyond cinema, Chatterjee was an influential figure in Bengali theatre, both as an actor and director, and was a prolific poet and writer. His profound impact on the arts was recognized with numerous accolades, including the Padma Bhushan (2004), Dadasaheb Phalke Award (2012) for lifetime achievement in Indian cinema and the Legion of Honour(2018) France’s highest civilian award. While Uttam Kumar and Soumitra Chatterjee were often perceived as rivals in the 1960s Bengali film industry, they actually shared a close, brotherly relationship. Their first meeting occurred at Soumitra's sister's wedding, where Uttam Kumar, a friend of Soumitra's brother-in-law was present. This personal connection fostered a deep friendship between the two actors, contradicting the popular belief of intense rivalry. Soumitra's best films include Opur Shongshar (1959), Charulota (1964),Devi (1960), Oronner Din Ratri (1970), Shonar Kella (1974), Obhijan (1962), Teen Konna (1961), Kapurush (1965), Joi Baba Felunath (1979), Ghore Baire (1984), Gonoshatru (1990), Oshoni Shonket (1973), Shakha Proshakha (1990), Hirok Rajar Deshe (1980), Teen Bhuboner Pare (1969), Shat Pake Badha(1963), Akash Kusum (1965), Bela Seshe (2015), Podokkhep (2006).

In 70's, Ranjit Mallick is famous for Youth Characterization of Interview, Calcutta 71. Rabi Ghosh and Anil Chatterjee is a notable actor for his Versatile Acting which impressed the Audience in short time.

In the 1960s, Bengal saw a host of talented actresses like Aparna Sen, Sharmila Tagore, Madhabi Mukherjee, Sandhya Roy and, Supriya Devi and Jayashree Kabir. Aparna Sen was one of the most successful actresses of the Golden Era. She became the leading heroine of the 1970s and since 1981 she has been directing films. One of the most well-known Bengali actresses was Sharmila Tagore, who debuted in Ray's The World of Apu, and became a major actress in Bengali cinema as well as Bollywood. Despite Suchitra Sen being the greatest actress, Sharmila was the most commercially successful actress in history with films like The World of Apu (1959), Devi (1960), Nayak (1966), Simabaddha (1967), and Aranyer Dinratri (1970).

Utpal Dutt is internationally known for his acting in movies and plays, especially Shakespearean plays. Bhanu Bandopadhyay, Rabi Ghosh, and Anup Kumar were best known for their comic timing, and with their versatile acting talent they stunned the audience and critics.

The pioneers in Bengali film music include Raichand Boral, Pankaj Mullick, and K. C. Dey, all associated with New Theatres Calcutta. The greatest composers of the golden era included Robin Chatterjee, Sudhin Dasgupta, Nachiketa Ghosh, Hemant Kumar, etc. Tarun Majumdar is well known for First time educational, cultural, and philosophical cinematic experiences for both a mass audience and a class audience, He abolished the division in taste between mass and class audiences. Majumdar is best known for such Evergreen films as Shriman Prithviraj, Ganadevata, Sansar Simante and Alo and Many more.

=== Cinematic Revival (1982–2007) ===
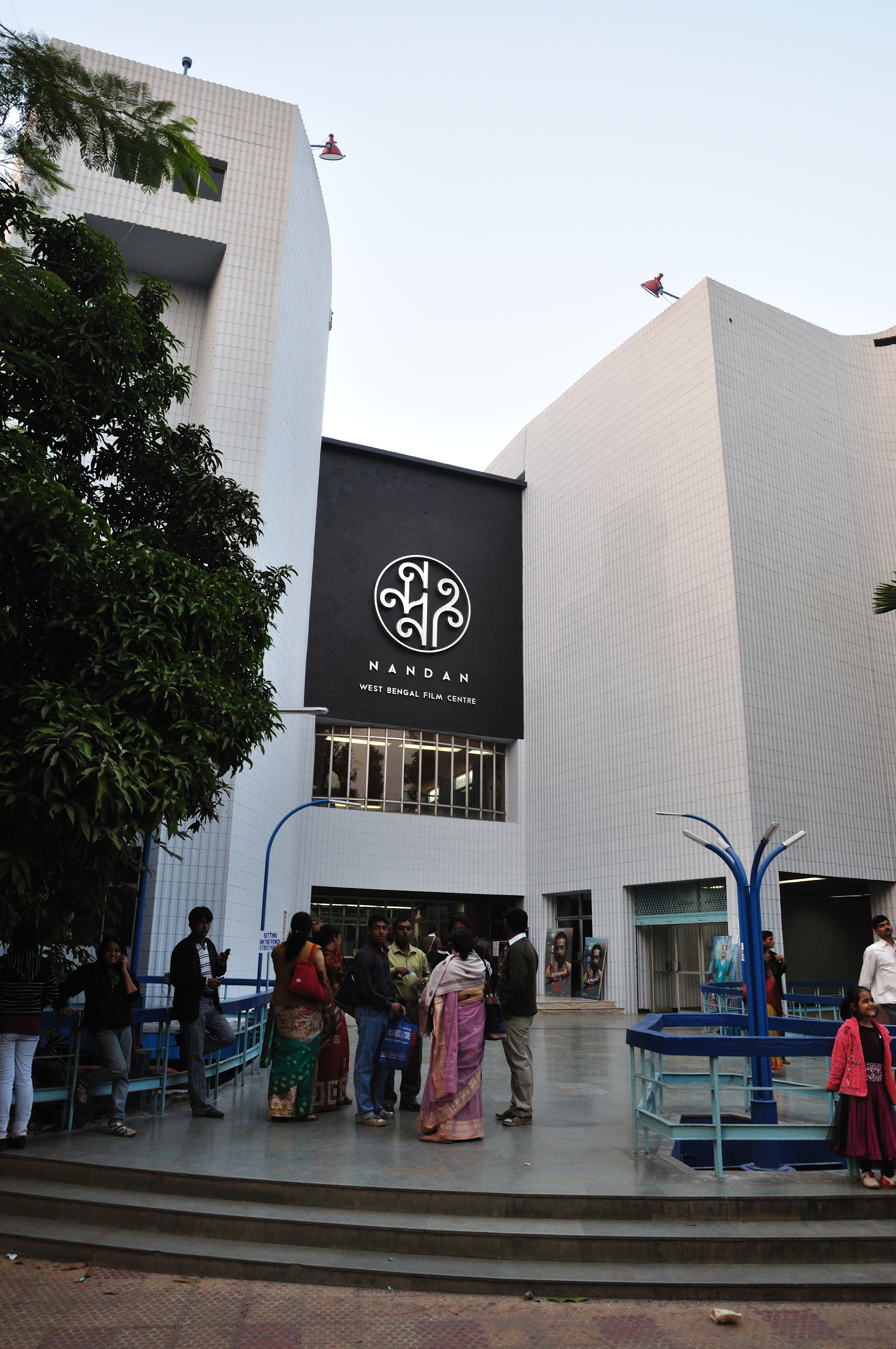
West Bengal Film Center in Kolkata

The revival in Bengali cinema dates from the rise of directors such as Anjan Choudhury, Haranath Chakraborty, Aparna Sen, Anjan Dutt, Goutam Ghosh, along with Rituparno Ghosh, Sandip Ray, Prabhat Roy, Sudeshna Roy, Buddhadeb Dasgupta, Anjan Das, Bappaditya Bandopadhyay, Sekhar Das, and Subrata Sen. Rituparno Ghosh made his first film, Hirer Angti, in 1992 and dominated Bengali cinema until his death in 2013, winning numerous national awards for films like Unishe April, Dahan and Utsab. Aparna Sen made her directorial debut in 1981 with the internationally lauded 36 Chowringhee Lane, which looked at the lives of Anglo-Indians living in Calcutta. Her later films have also been celebrated: Paromitar Ek Din, The Japanese Wife, Goynar Baksho.

Buddhadeb Dasgupta is best known for award-winning films like Uttara, Mondo Meyer Upakhyan, Charachar, and Janala. Goutam Ghose is Internationally Acclaimed for Cult Classic films as Antarjali Jatra, Padma Nadir Majhi, Moner Manush and many more. Prabhat Ray is popular for Romantic Family drama for Lathi. Actresses including Moon Moon Sen, Konkona Sen Sharma, Laboni Sarkar, Satabdi Roy, Rituparna Sengupta, Chumki Chowdhury, Rachna Banerjee and Srabanti Chatterjee were popular and active in this period. Actors such as Prosenjit Chatterjee, Victor Banerjee, Chiranjeet Chakraborty, Ranjit Mallick, Tapas Paul and Ferdous Ahmed are considered superstars in this era.

=== Modern era (2008–2023) ===
Many work in the domestic film industry, while others have gone to work in Bollywood. Successful films by directors from this generation include Asha Jaoar Majhe, Tekka, Korpur, Alik Sukh Cholai, Cockpit, Aparajito, Bhooter Bhabishyat, Binodiini, Angshumaner Chhobi, Bakita Byaktigato, Pradhan, Fotema, and Boomerang.

Detective films and family drama films have been the most popular and successful genre in this era. The success of detective films largely owes to the film adaptation of popular fictional characters like Kakababu, Byomkesh, Kiriti Roy, Mitin Masi, Ekenbabu and Tenida.

Successful Bengali films are getting Hindi remakes in Bollywood, Marathi remakes and Malayalam remakes (Gang of Ghosts, Salt Mango Tree, Welcome Zindagi, Ravanasura, Jalebi, Begum Jaan, Cirkus (film), Meri Awas Suno, Shastry Viruddh Shastry). Also, Bengali films have in the recent times have turned the cinematic spotlight on Kolkata, introducing the city to a wider national and global audience (Kahaani, Piku, Detective Byomkesh Bakshy!). After the digital film era, Bengali directors who have found artistic and commercial success in contemporary Bengali films include: Aniruddha Roy Chowdhury, Aniket Chattopadhyay, Anjan Dutta, Raj Chakraborty, Mainak Bhowmick, Srijit Mukherjee, Nandita Roy and Shiboprosad Mukherjee.

During this period, actors such as Prosenjit Chatterjee, Mithun Chakraborty, Sabyasachi Chakrabarty, Jishu Sengupta, Soham Chakraborty, Parambrata Chatterjee, Anjan Dutt rose to popularity. Later, Dev, Jeet, Abir Chatterjee, Ankush Hazra, Anirban Bhattacharya, Jeetu Kamal have gained popularity and have been active. Among them Prosenjit Chatterjee, Mithun Chakraborty, Tapas Paul, Dev and Jeet, Abir Chatterjee and Ankush Hazra have gained immense popularity and are considered as the superstars of 21st Century. Actresses such as Koel Mallick, Srabanti Chatterjee, Subhashree Ganguly, Mimi Chakraborty, Nusrat Jahan, Payel Sarkar, Rituparna Sengupta, Puja Banerjee, Sayantika Banerjee, Priyanka Sarkar, Sreelekha Mitra, Raima Sen, Konkona Sen Sharma, Ananya Chatterjee, Gargi Roychowdhury, Aparajita Ghosh Das, Rimjhim Mitra and later, Idhika Paul, Ishaa Saha, Subhashree Ganguly, Susmita Chatterjee, Koushani Mukherjee, Mimi Chakraborty, Madhumita Sarcar, Nusrat Jahan, Ritabhari Chakraborty, Rittika Sen, Sohini Sarkar, Jaya Ahsan, Sauraseni Maitra, Angana Roy, Anusha Viswanathan and Tuhina Das have been active.

=== New era (since 2024) ===
Maya Satya Bhram, The Cloud and the Man, Chaalchitra Ekhon, Putulnacher Itikatha, Dhrubor Aschorjo Jibon, Binodiini, Deep Fridge,Lawho Gouranger Naam Rey, Pinjar are bringing a new flavor to Bengali cinema. In the recent years, a younger generation of Mainstream directors has come to the scene, like Sujit Rino Dutta, Dhruv Banerjee, Avijit Sen, Birsa Dasgupta.

Visual filmmmkers are Subhrajit Mitra, Samik Roy Choudhury, Tathagata Mukherjee, Pratim D. Gupta, Soukarya Ghosal Atiul Islam, along with Sayantan Ghosal.Art house filmmakers like Abhinandan Banerjee, Pradipta Bhattacharya, Arjunn Dutta, Kaushik Ganguly, Indrasis Acharya, Aditya Vikram Sengupta and Aniruddha Roy Chowdhury. 21st century Bengali Superstars are Ujaan Ganguly, Adrit Roy.

== Budgets ==
Many of the most critically acclaimed Bengali films were low-budget films, including Mrinal Sen's famous Calcutta Trilogy (1971-1973), and Satyajit Ray's The Apu Trilogy (1955–1959). The first film in the trilogy, Pather Panchali (1955), was produced on a shoestring budget of Rs. 150,000 ($32000) using an amateur cast and crew. All his other films that followed also had low budgets, with his most expensive films since the 60's being Saptapadi by Kar, Jhinder Bondi (1961) by Sinha, Saat Pake Bandha by Kar, The Adventures of Goopy And Bagha (1968) at Rs. 600,000 ($80,000) and Shatranj Ke Khilari (1977) at Rs. 6 million ($230,000).

Bombaiyer Bombete, produced by Ramoji Films at a cost of Rs 8 million, recovered its costs within three weeks and earned 20 million in all. The movie has brought back the concept of family entertainment with Sandip Ray's gambit of contemporising the plot paying him a rich dividend. Admitting that he did not expect this success, he told Life that he was now lining up another such film for release next year. Earlier, a film by award-winning director Buddhadeb Dasgupta's Mondo Meyer Upakhyan (The Tale of a Fallen Girl) produced by Arjoe Entertainments netted nearly Rs 7 million through the sale of overseas rights against a cost of Rs 0.6 million. Haranath Chakraborty His film Sathi (Companion) created a record by recouping over five times its production cost, although the film Chokher Bali, with big names like Aishwarya Rai Bachchan, Rituparno Ghosh and Tagore, failed to yield expected results. The movie, billed at Rs 16.5 million (the highest among Bengali films).

Hollywood houses like Columbia TriStar have made their debut in distributing Bengali movies. According to industry experts, several issues need to be addressed to build on this resurgence and consolidate it. These include inadequate infrastructure, which often compels moviemakers to go outside the State for facilities pushing up costs, poor marketing and distribution, and increasing competition from Bangladeshi films.

== Rankings ==
A number of Satyajit Ray films appeared in the Sight & Sound Critics' Poll of all-time greatest films, including The Apu Trilogy (ranked No. 4 in 1992 if votes are combined), The Music Room (ranked No. 27 in 1992), Charulata (ranked No. 41 in 1992) and Days and Nights in the Forest (ranked No. 81 in 1982). The 2002 Sight & Sound critics' and directors' poll also included the Ritwik Ghatak films Meghe Dhaka Tara (ranked #231) and Komal Gandhar (ranked #346).

In 1998, the critics' poll conducted by the Asian film magazine Cinemaya included The Apu Trilogy (ranked No. 1 if votes are combined), Ray's Charulata and The Music Room (both tied at #11), and Ghatak's Subarnarekha (also tied at #11). In 1999, The Village Voice top 250 "Best Film of the Century" critics' poll also included The Apu Trilogy (ranked No. 5 if votes are combined). In 2005, The Apu Trilogy was also included in Time's All-Time 100 Movies list. In 1992, the Sight & Sound Critics' Poll ranked Ray at No. 7 in its list of "Top 10 Directors" of all time, and Days and Nights in the Forest (ranked No. 81 in 1982).

=== National Board of Review (USA) ===
- National Board of Review Award for Best Foreign Language Film: Satyajit Ray (1958- Pather Panchali & 1960- The World of Apu)

=== The Annual Academy Awards (Oscars) ===
- Academy Honorary Award: Satyajit Ray (1992- "In recognition of his rare mastery of the art of motion pictures, and of his profound humanitarian outlook, which has had an indelible influence on filmmakers and audiences throughout the world.")

== National Award ==
The National Film Award for Best Feature Film in Bengali is one of the National Film Awards presented annually by the Directorate of Film Festivals, the organisation set up by Ministry of Information and Broadcasting, India. It is one of several awards presented for feature films and awarded with Rajat Kamal (Silver Lotus).

The National Film Awards, established in 1954, are the most prominent film awards in India that merit the best of the Indian cinema. The ceremony also presents awards for films in various regional languages.

== Regional awards ==
- Bengal Film Journalists' Association Awards - The oldest Association of Film critics in India, founded in 1937, by the inspiration and determination of the handful of pioneers amongst the then thin section of scribes that were drawn to film journalism with a lofty mission to serve the developing film journalism and film industry.
- Filmfare Awards Bangla - Annual Awards presented by the Filmfare magazine of The Times Group to honour the cinematic excellence in Bengali Cinema
- Films and Frames Digital Film Awards - Annual Awards presented by the Films and Frames group to honour the cinematic excellence in Bengali Cinema
- Anandalok Awards - Ceremony is one of the most prominent film events given for Bengali cinema in India
- Bengali Film and Television Awards - Annual Awards presented by the Redwine Entertainment group to honour the cinematic excellence in Bengali Cinema and OTT
- Filmfare Awards East - Used to honour cinematic excellence in Bengali, Assamese and Odia film industry. Discontinued after 2014.

== Cinema-related organisations ==
- Satyajit Ray Film and Television Institute, Department of Film direction and Screenplay, Editing, Cinematography, Sound Recording and Design, Baghajatin, South 24 Parganas, West Bengal.
- Jadavpur University, Department of Film studies, Jadavpur, Kolkata, West Bengal.
- Institute of Mass Communication Film and Television Studies, Tollygung, Kolkata, West Bengal.

== See also ==
- Lists of Bengali films
- List of highest-grossing Bengali films

== Notes ==
- Aamar Ami(Bengali)-Uttam Kumar Chattopadhyay—Dey's Publishing, Calcutta,1980
- Aamar Jug Aamar Gaan(Bengali)—Pankaj Kumar Mullick—Firma KLM Pvt Ltd., Calcutta 1980
- Chalacchitrer Antormahol by Chakraborty Piyali, Banerjee Santanu, Publisher=Suhrid Publication, 1st ed. (2013); ISBN No.: 978-81-92151-97-7
- Banala Bhashay Chalachchdra Charcha(Bengali)-Ehfi Tathya, aanji Opanhr r Bha charyr CharK Goswami, Tapas Paul—North Calcutta Film Society, Calcutta, 1995
- Bangla Chalachchdra Shilper llihas (1897–1947)(Bengali)—Kalish Mukhapadhyay—Poop I lancha Prahashi
- Bangla Chalachchdrer llihas (1st Part)(Bengali)-Pranab Kumar Biswas Samakal Prakashani, Calcul
- Bangla Sahhya O Bangla Chalachchitra (1st Part)(Bengali)-Jishh Kumar Mukhapadhyay—Ananda~ha
- Banglar Chalachchitrakar—Nisht Kumar Mukhopadhyay—Slanda Pu ishrs, Calcr
- Banglar Nat-Nati—Sudhir Basu—Calcutta, 1933
- Cniirabani Chitr barshihi ^119520ed. 60ur Chattopadhyay & Sunil Gar~adhya~Ch^ar$b
- Cinema anr I—Ri ih Kumar Ghatah— h
- Rhrw Memorial Trust, Calcu^na, 1987
- Filrnography of Sixty En inentlndian Movie Makers—Ft I Ra M
- Nirbah Juger Chhayaloher Katha—Premanhur at rth —~ kudta
- Sonar Daag—60uranga Prasad Ghosh~oc^frnaya Prakashani, Calculla, 1982
- Bengali Film Directory– ed. by Ansu Sur, Nandan, Calcutta, 1999
- 70 years of Indian Cinema, ed. by T.N. Ramachandran, Cinemaa India International, Bombay, 1985
- A Pictorial History of Indian Cinema, Firoj Rangogoonwalla, The Hamlyn Publishing Group, London, 1979
- Cinematography to Videography: Aesthetics and Technology by Chakraborty Piyali, Banerjee Santanu, Published by Kalyani Foundation, 1st ed. (2013); ISBN No.: 978-81-927505-3-8
- Encyclopedia of Indian Cinema – Ashish Rajadhyaksha, Paul Willemen, Oxford University Press, New Delhi, 1994
