= Ei Path Jodi Na Shes Hoy =

1961 song by Hemanta Mukherjee and Sandhya Mukherjee

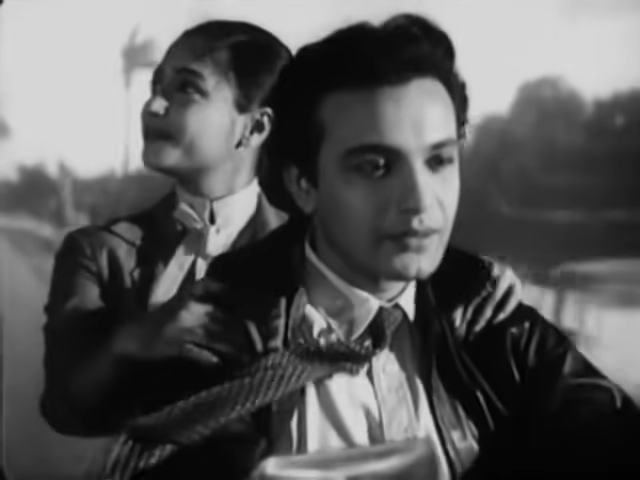
- Scene from just before the song

Song by Hemanta Mukherjee and Sandhya Mukherjee

from the album Saptapadi
- Language: Bengali
- English title: If this path did not end
- Released: 1961
- Length: 3:10
- Label: Saregama
- Composer: Hemanta Mukherjee
- Lyricist: Gauriprasanna Mazumder
- Producer: Uttam Kumar

"Ei Poth Jodi Na Shesh Hoy"
Full song from the film Saptapadi

"Ei Poth Jodi Na Shes Hoy" is a Bengali romantic pop song by singers Hemanta Mukherjee and Sandhya Mukherjee, used in the film Saptapadi, released in 1961. Lyrics written by Gauriprasanna Mazumder, music composed by Hemanta Mukherjee, and produced by Bengali actor Uttam Kumar. Originally shown in the film as Uttam Kumar riding a motorcycle with Suchitra Sen in the back seat, both singing the song (lip-synching), in the roads of the countryside. The scene is regarded as one of the greatest moments in the history of Bengali cinema.

== Background ==
Before attempting to ride the bike in the film, Uttam Kumar had taken motorcycle driving lessons from a motorcycle collector in South Kolkata. He practiced for much time perfecting riding the film motorcycle correctly and finely as to be a featured in the film. The motorcycle used in film was either a BSA Golden Flash or a BMW motorcycle.

== In the film ==
The film Saptapadi follows the story of an Indian student and a British student, played by Uttam Kumar and Suchitra Sen, named as Krishnendu and Rina Brown respectively in the film. It is the second song in the film, shown as Uttam Kumar and Suchitra Sen riding on a BMW or BSA Golden Flash motorcycle, with Kumar driving and Sen sitting in the back seat, in the roads of a mountain side (cliff). The song is sung by Hemanta Mukherjee and Sandhya Mukherjee, separately from the film showing, with Kumar and Sen lip-synching to the off screen song. The scene with the song lasts roughly 3 minutes and 10 seconds, although it is determinant from when to when.

== Creation ==
In a note written by Uttam Kumar's grandson, Gourab Chatterjee, Chatterjee claimed that Kumar and Sen never sat on or drove the BMW motorcycle in Saptapadi. Director and cinematographer Ajoy Kar recorded Kumar and Sen sitting together in successive shots and fused the scenes on separately-shot parts of the film, not shown in the real-time film, where dummies were placed on top of the motorcycle that drives by the road, in different parts of the road creating a featured part in the film and the Bengali cinema. The BMW motorcycle shown was later found in a garage in South Kolkata, probably of the collector, and was said to be a movie prop.

== Remake ==
Riya Sen, granddaughter of Suchitra Sen, would sing "Ei Path Jodi Na Shesh Hoy". Souvik Gupta stated the song to be entirely different but retain the single line of the original song. It was to be used in Hero 420 film, along with four other tracks, O Riya, O re Priya, 3G and Chaichi toke. Shadaab Hashmi had also sung a remake of the song, lyrics written by Prosen.

== Use by West Bengal Police ==
"Ei Poth Jodi Na Shesh Hoy" was used by West Bengal Police to promote the message "Safe Drive, Save Life", a program created to encourage people to drive safely by West Bengal Chief Minister Mamata Banerjee. Kolkata Police posted a static photograph of the motorcycle scene with the program text on Twitter on wearing helmets for motorcycle drivers and pillion (passenger seat) riders. In the photograph, Kumar (Krishnendu) said in a text box "Ei poth jodi na shesh hoy," (Note: If this road did not end (English translation)) and Sen (Rina Brown) said in another text box, "Duto helmet hole besh hoy", (Note: It would have been good if there were two helmets (English translation)) retweeted by 78 users as of May 18, 2018. The police stated that there were more motorcycle accidents in the first quarter of 2018, with 2,718 reported accidents compared to the year 2017, with 3,177 reported accidents.
