= Pankhiraj =

1979 Indian film

- Directed by: Pijush Basu
- Written by: Pijush Basu
- Screenplay by: Pijush Basu
- Produced by: Asim Sarkar
- Starring: Uttam Kumar; Soumitra Chatterjee; Samit Bhanja; Santu Mukherjee; Utpal Dutt; Nandita Bose
- Cinematography: Bijoy Ghosh
- Edited by: Baidyanath Chatterjee
- Music by: Hemanta Mukherjee
- Production company: Usha Films
- Distributed by: Piyali Pictures Pvt Ltd.
- Release date: 1 February 1979
- Running time: 130 minutes
- Country: India
- Language: Bengali

Pankhiraj (English:Lord of Birds) is a 1980 Indian Bengali-language action film written and directed by Pijush Basu. It had an ensemble cast consisting of Uttam Kumar, Soumitra Chatterjee, Nandita Bose, Utpal Dutt, Samit Bhanja and Santu Mukherjee in lead roles, while Tarun Kumar, Chinmoy Roy, Shambhu Bhattacharya, Durgadas Banerjee and Anamika Saha play another pivotal roles.

== Plot ==
During his journey to Kolkata by train, Sunil gets down to the Prantik station as the train was stopped at the station for about 20 minutes due to mechanical problems. He finds a liquor store nearby the station and goes there, as he feels uncomfortable without drinking in the evening. There he meets George D' Souza, who was totally addicted to alcohol. After Sunil calls him a drunkard, he stars fistfight with Sunil. Meanwhile during their hand-to-hand combat, Shankar appears there, who respected George very much. When he runs his hand over Sunil, looking at his face, Shankar is surprised that he is none other than his childhood friend. He introduces Sunil to George and both Sunil and George apologises to each other for the misunderstanding.

On his way home, George sees a disturbance in the local slum, where some goons were trying to forcibly kidnap the slum girls as well as prostitutes. He immediately arrives there and fights with the goons to protect the girls to be kidnapped. To help George, Rabi comes there to beat them up and from him, comes to know that in the village, a young man named Sunil has appeared. After hearing all about Sunil in George's mouth, Rabi realizes that he is also his friend. He first and foremostly goes to the liquor shop and hugs Sunil after meeting him for a long time. Shankar and Rabi comes to know from him that he was going to Kolkata in search of a job and got down here because of the train disturbance. They make Sunil their assistant in their own garage and he willingly joins them in their garage.

== Cast ==
- Uttam Kumar as George D'Souza "George Dada"
- Soumitra Chatterjee as Shankar
- Samit Bhanja as Rabi
- Santu Mukherjee as Sunil
- Utpal Dutt as Mota Ghosh, a contractor from Dhanbad
- Nandita Bose as Rani, Sunil's love interest
- Soma Chowdhury as Leena, George Da's daughter and Shankar's love interest
- Shambhu Bhattacharya as Sheetal, Ghosh's henchman
- Rabin Banerjee as Madhu, Ghosh's henchman
- Baapi Banerjee as Bhanu
- Tarun Kumar as Dr. Sen
- Anamika Saha as Phuli, a prostitute
- Rasharaj Chakraborty as Michael Da
- Kshudiram Bhattacharya as Inspector Das

== Soundtrack ==
All lyrics are written by Pulak Bandyopadhyay; all music is composed by Hemanta Mukhopadhyay.

No.	Title	Lyrics	Music	Singer(s)	Length
1.	"Heshe Nao Dudin"	Pulak Bandyopadhyay	Hemanta Mukhopadhyay	Manna Dey; Shakti Thakur	4:57
2.	"Oi Durey Bohu Durey"	Pulak Bandyopadhyay	Hemanta Mukhopadhyay	Manna Dey	2:34
3.	"Amra Teenti Jon"	Pulak Bandyopadhyay	Hemanta Mukhopadhyay	Hemanta Mukhopadhyay	3:08
Total length:					10:39
