= Jibone Ki Pabo Na =

1969 song by Manna Dey

Song by Manna Dey

from the album Teen Bhubaner Pare
- Language: Bengali
- English title: Things I will not get in life
- Released: March 21, 1969
- Genre: Rock and roll
- Length: 3:13
- Label: Saregama
- Songwriter: Sudhin Dasgupta
- Producer: Sudhin Dasgupta

Music video
- "Jibane Ki Pabo Na" on YouTube

"Jibone Ki Pabo Na" (জীবনে কি পাব না) is a Bengali-language song by Indian singer Manna Dey, with music and lyrics by songwriter Sudhin Dasgupta. The song is from the film Teen Bhubaner Pare, released in 1969 and directed by the director Ashutosh Bandyopadhyay. The song is picturized on actor Soumitra Chatterjee. "Jibone Ki Pabo Na" describes the spirit and life during college days and is based on youth optimism. The energy and tune of the song by Dasgupta and Dey's singing style make it a highly popular rendition for youths. The song's genre is defined as rock and roll.

"Jibone Ki Pabo Na" is one of the four songs of Teen Bhubaner Pare that gained popularity for the film. In the film, Sarasi Roy, an upper middle-class girl, falls in love with Montu, a lower middle-class boy. During the song's rendition, Soumitra Chatterjee does the dancing in a twist style, which was highly unconventional for a film hero during the prevalent time. And the actor Rabi Ghosh dances in a slow-mo style, with a brief appearance of Sarasi Roy portrayed by Tanuja. "Jibone Ki Pabo Na" is featured in the 2015 film Piku, where "Big B" dances to this song, and falls ill next day.

In a comment of Soumitra Chatterjee about the songs of the film, he said: "Sudhin Dasgupta and Manna Dey were the biggest contributors to this film. The songs added a special charm to the film. Without them, the film would not have been worthwhile. Just like how Feluda cannot be without Jatayu. This film would not be successful without these songs. And Manna Dey's contribution is a lot for that." The song, along with "Hoyto Tomari Jonno" became very popular among youths and became associated as upbeat songs. The song was recreated and rearranged by singer Shovan Ganguly in April 2024, with its record label and producer as Saregama.

== Cover version ==
"Jibone Ki Pabo Na" was sung by an Indo-French couple, Meghdut Roychowdhury from Kolkata and Pauline Laravoire from France, which gained popularity as a cover version of the song. Roychowdhury and Laravoire uploaded their videos singing songs every Sunday, with "Jibone Ki Pabo Na" released on March 13, 2022 on the social media platform Instagram, gaining 30,000 views within one day. In the video, Laravoire and Roychowdhury are seen singing the song while Roychowdhury plays the guitar, as reported by various newspapers. The video caption was titled "We did a #mannadey for this week's Indo-French Singing Sundays session! And @paulinelaravoire has never been able to refuse the urge to swing whenever this song has come on in the past. So there you go. Have a swinging Sunday, folks!" Roychowdhury wrote that Laravoire would dance and sing when she heard "Ke Tumi Nandini" (alternative name of "Jibone Ki Pabo Na"), and they decided to sing the song together for their Sunday musical session.
