= Shyamal Bose =

Indian film director

- শ্যামল বোস
- Born: 8 August 1963 (age 61); Kolkata, West Bengal, India
- Occupation(s): Film director, actor, screenwriter
- Years active: 2010–present
- Spouse: Chandana Bose (M. 1995)
- Parent(s): Robin Bose; Mukti Bose

Shyamal Bose (Bengali: শ্যামল বোস; born 8 August 1963) is an Indian film director, actor and screenwriter in Bengali Cinema or Tollywood. He is also the co-founder of the theatre group Baghbazar Natya Kendra, situated in Kolkata. He is known for his films Antim Yatra (2015), Bastav (2016) & Asamay (2017).

== Career ==
He started his career with acting in theatres in Kolkata at the age of 20. His first film as writer-director is Notun Surjo released in the year 2010, he also acted in the same movie and then he continued to writing & directing films like Neel Swapna, Nayan Tara, Alor Khonje and others.

== Filmography ==
Year	Film	Cast	Director	Writer	Actor
2010	Notun Surja	Bhaskar Banerjee, Somasree Chaki, Shyamal Bose	Yes	Yes	Yes
2012	Porir Swapno	Shyamal Bose, Trina Das	Yes	Yes	Yes
2013	Neel Swapno	Bhaskar Banerjee, Dolon Roy, Shyamal Bose	Yes	Yes	Yes
2014	Nayantara	Bhaskar Banerjee, Shyamal Bose	Yes	Yes	Yes
2015	Ashani Sanket	Bhaskar Banerjee, Shyamal Bose, Jinia	Yes	Yes	Yes
2015	Alor Khonje	Bhaskar Banerjee, Kushal Chakraborty, Shyamal Bose, Jinia	Yes	Yes	Yes
2015	Antim Yatra	Soumitra Chatterjee, Kharaj Mukherjee, Samadarshi Dutta, Shyamal Bose, Jinia	Yes	Yes	Yes
2016	Bastav	Soumitra Chatterjee, Saswata Chatterjee, Debolina Dutta, Bhaskar Banerjee, Shyamal Bose, Jinia	Yes	Yes	Yes
2017	Asamay	Soumitra Chatterjee, Kushal Chakraborty, Jinia	Yes	Yes	Yes
2018	Jaal (2018 film)	Soumitra Chatterjee, Supriyo Dutta, Jinia	Yes	Yes	Yes
2018	Astitwa	Soumitra Chatterjee, Debolina Dutta, Supriyo Dutta, Bhaskar Banerjee, Shyamal Bose, Jinia	Yes	Yes	Yes
2019	Drishti	Soumitra Chatterjee, Biswajit Chakraborty, Shana Bhattacharya, Pallab Gharami, Shyamal Bose	Yes	Yes	Yes
2021	Samay-The Time	Soumitra Chatterjee, Biswajit Chakraborty, Shana Bhattacharya, Supriyo Dutta, Bhashkar Banerjee, Deep Chatterjee, Tua Biswas, Shyamal Bose	Yes	Yes	Yes
2021	ফিরে দেখা (Phire Dekha)	Soumitra Chatterjee, Supriyo Dutta, Debdut Ghosh, Sushita Roy, Shreyosree Biswas, Sangita Das, Deep Chatterjee, Malay Mandal, Shyco Mandal, Kakuli Mandal, Priyanka Mandal, Upasana Gorui, Laxmikanta Hazra, Abhishek Saha Shyamal Bose	Yes	Yes	Yes
2022	দুই (Dui)	Soumitra Chatterjee, Paoli Dam, Shyamal Bose, Sorav Bose, Srija Mondal, Mishti Ghosh, Konika Adhikari	Yes	Yes	Yes
