= Samit Bhanja =

Indian actor (1944–2003)

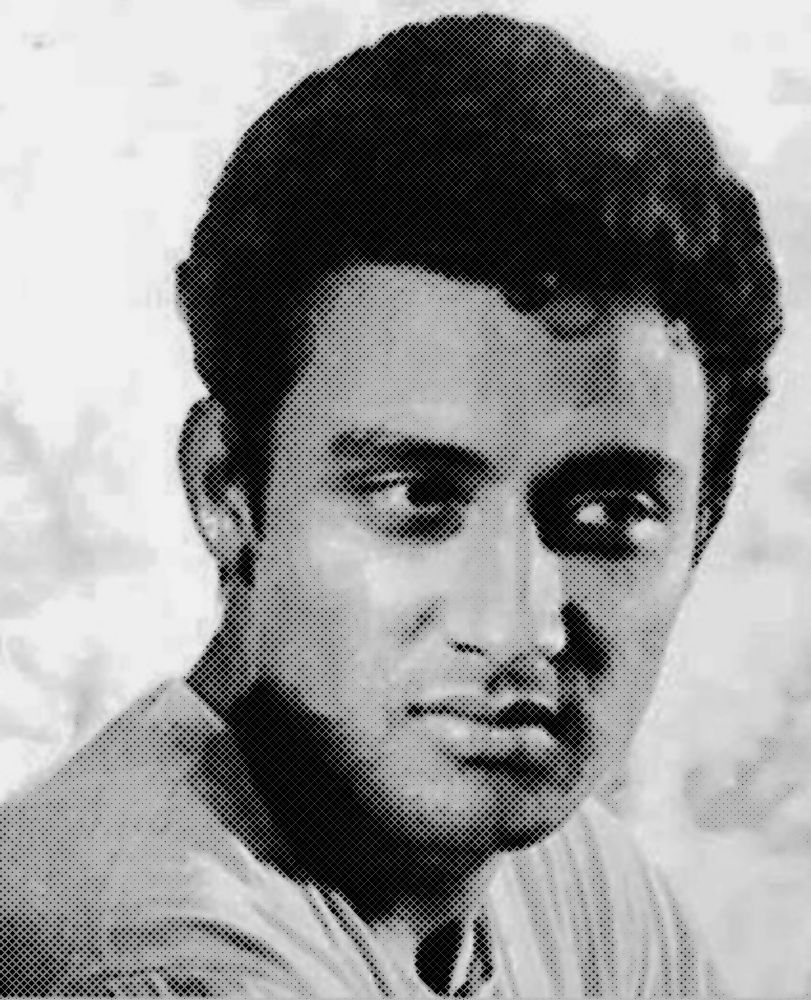
- Born: 2 January 1944; Tamluk, Bengal Presidency, British India
- Died: 24 July 2003 (aged 59); Kolkata, West Bengal, India
- Education: Tamluk Hamilton High School; Jhargram Polytechnic College
- Occupations: Actor; director
- Spouse: Ranja Bhanja

Samit Bhanja (Bengali: শমিত ভঞ্জ; 2 January 1944 – 24 July 2003) was an Indian actor and director known for his work in the Bengali cinema. He was one of the most promising actors of his time, working in both Bengali and Hindi cinema. He is best known for portraying the character "Kakababu" in the 1973 Bengali film "Sabun Dwiper Raja".

== Early life ==
Bhanja was born in Tamluk, Purba Medinipur in an affluent family, originally from Chandrakona, Ghatal to Pritimoy Bhanja and Shila Debi. His grandfather had moved to Tamluk for his legal practice. He received his formal education from the prestigious Hamilton High School. Throughout his childhood he displayed a rebellious and adventurous spirit. Often getting into all sorts of troubles and fights in the neighborhood for this attribute.

== Career ==
Since his school days he had an active passion for acting, he even joined a local acting club called the "Kalpotaru friends club" at Tamluk. Subsequently, he joined Rupkar, the theatre group of Sabitabrata Dutta and enacted in several plays in early 1960s. He made his screen debut with Balai Sen's 1965 Bengali film Surer Agun. He is remembered as the male lead, Navin, of the successful Hindi film Guddi, opposite Jaya Bhaduri. In addition to acting in film, he acted in theatre and jatras, and was associated with the Rupkar group theatre.

== Personal life ==
He married his childhood sweetheart Ranja and had 3 daughters, Rakhi, Bidisha and Saheli.

== Death ==
He died in Kolkata at the age of 59 due to cancer. Fellow actor Soumitra Chatterjee provided him with aid during this time.

== Selected filmography ==
1. Surer Agun (1965)
2. Hatey Bazarey (1967)
3. Apanjan (1968) – Chheno
4. Pratham Kadam Phool (1969) – Bhajahari Manna
5. Parineeta – Girin
6. Natun Pata (1969)
7. Banajyotsna (1969)
8. Aranyer Din Ratri (1970) – Hari
9. Rupasi (1970) – Balaram
10. Guddi (1971) – Navin (as Samit)
11. Janani (1971)
12. Atattar Din Pare (1971)
13. Pratham Pratishruty (1971) – Rasbihari
14. Ajker Nayak (1972)
15. Sesh Parba (1972)
16. Sapath Nilam (1972)
17. Jaban (1972)
18. Picnic (1972)
19. Achena Atithi (1973)
20. Wahi Raat Wahi Aawaz (1973)
21. Chithi (1973) – Prasenjit Roy
22. Fuleswari (1974)
23. Fuleswari (1974)
24. Asati (1974)
25. Anjane Mehman (1975)
26. Salaam Memsaab (1975)
27. Kitne Paas Kitne Door (1976)
28. Harmonium (1976) – Ratan
29. Jiban Marur Prante (1976)
30. Datta (1976) – Bilashbihari
31. Bilwamangal (1976)
32. Ek Bindu Sukh (1977)
33. Kabita (1977)
34. Golap Bou (1977)
35. Mrigayaa (1977) – Rebel
36. Shaanaai (1977) – Haradhan
37. Striker (1978)
38. Ganadevata (1979) – Aniruddha
39. Sabuj Dwiper Raja (1979) – Raja Roychowdhury – Kakababu
40. Bono Basar (1979)
41. Dadar Kirti (1980) – Anil (as Samit Bhuiyan)
42. Parabesh (1980)
43. Aro Ekjan (1980)
44. Upalabdhi (1981)
45. Shahar Theke Dooray (1981) – Doctor Chatterjee
46. Kalankini Kankabati (1981)
47. Faisala (1982)
48. Rajbabhu (1982)
49. Amrita Kumbher Sandhaney (1982)
50. Uttar Meleni (1982)
51. Rajbadhu (1982)
52. Faisala (1982)
53. Prayashchitta (1983)
54. Rajeshwari (1983)
55. Abhinoy Noy (1983)
56. Didi (1984)
57. Debigarjan (1984)
58. Jiban Sathi (1985)
59. Dui Adhyay (1986)
60. Urbashi (1986)
61. Phera (1988)
62. Sudhu Tomari (1988)
63. Jar Jey Priyo (1989)
64. Jhankar (1989)
65. Asha-o-Bhalobasha (1989)
66. Garmil (1990)
67. Raktalekha (1992)
68. Surer Bhubane (1992)
69. Juya (1992)
70. Sarbojaya (1994)
71. DAGI (1994)
72. Bonophool (1994)
73. Mohini (1995)
74. Drishti (1995)
75. Protidhwani (1995)
76. Abar Aranye (2003) – Harinath Dutta aka Hari (final film role)
