= Eylex Cinemas =

Chain of movie theatres in India

- Company type: Private
- Industry: Entertainment
- Founded: 2007; 19 years ago in Ranchi, Jharkhand, India
- Headquarters: India
- Area served: Ranchi, Asansol, Deoghar, Jamshedpur, Muzaffarpur, Sambalpur, Jharsuguda, Hazaribagh and Silchar

Eylex Films Pvt is a chain of multiplex and single-screen theatres. Eylex films pioneered the multiplex model in Jharkhand and Bihar. Its first multiplex was established in Ranchi in 2007, marking the first multiplex in the city of Ranchi and in states like Jharkhand, Bihar, West Bengal, Odisha and Assam.

At present, the chain operates 24 screens in cities such as Asansol, Deoghar, Ranchi, Jamshedpur, Muzaffarpur, Sambalpur, Jharsuguda and Silchar. The chain is actively looking to expand its footprint across India.

== Chain of theatres ==
Though the initial plan was to build one multiplex Eylex, the positive response from cine viewers led to the launch of Eylex in Ranchi, Jamshedpur, Sambalpur, Deoghar, Jharsuguda, Asansol and Silchar, as well as the newly opened DRB Palace Motijheel, Muzaffarpur.

== Film Production ==
Eylex Films ventured into film production in 2016. The first film produced by them is Mandobasar Galpo, a Bengali film, scheduled to release on 24 March 2017. The film has been directed by Tathagata Banerjee and produced by Akash Jalan and Vickash Chowdhury. The film stars Parambrata Chattopadhyay, Paoli Dam, Anindya Chatterjee, Indrasish Roy and Kaushik Sen.

== Related Articles ==
- Carnival Cinemas
