= Vivaha Bandham =

- Theatrical release poster
- Directed by: P. S. Ramakrishna Rao
- Written by: A. Picheswara Rao (dialogues)
- Screenplay by: P. S. Ramakrishna Rao
- Based on: Saat Pake Bandha by Ashutosh Mukherjee
- Produced by: P. S. Ramakrishna Rao
- Starring: N. T. Rama Rao; Bhanumathi Ramakrishna
- Cinematography: Annayya
- Edited by: M. V. Rajan
- Music by: M. B. Sreenivasan; Bhanumathi Ramakrishna (Supervision)
- Production company: Bharani Pictures
- Distributed by: Navayuga Films
- Release date: 23 October 1964
- Running time: 140 minutes
- Country: India
- Language: Telugu

Vivaha Bandham (transl. Marriage Relation) is a 1964 Indian Telugu-language drama film, produced and directed by P. S. Ramakrishna Rao of Bharani Pictures. The film stars N. T. Rama Rao, Bhanumathi Ramakrishna with music composed by M. B. Sreenivasan, while Bhanumathi supervised. It is a remake of the Bengali film Saat Pake Bandha (1963).

== Cast ==
- P. Bhanumathi as Bharati
- N. T. Rama Rao as Chandra Shekar
- V. Nagayya as Principal Appa Rao
- Padmanabham as Kanta Rao
- M. Balaiah (guest appearance)
- Haranath (guest appearance)
- Prabhakar Reddy as Raghu
- Vangara
- Dr. Sivaramakrishnaiah
- Suryakantham as Manikyamba
- Hemalatha as Shantamma
- Vasanthi as Aruna
- Radha Kumari

== Soundtrack ==
Music composed by M. B. Sreenivasan. Lyrics were written by C. Narayana Reddy.

S. No.	Song title	Singers	length
1	"Vinnava Aah Vinnava"	P. Bhanumathi	4:18
2	"Neetilona Ningilona"	P. B. Srinivas, P. Bhanumathi	4:29
3	"Nagumomu Ganaleni"	P. Bhanumathi	6:11
4	"Alumagalu Vidipoyenanthane"	P. Bhanumathi	3:22
5	"Neetilona Ningilona" (Sad)	P. B. Srinivas, P. Bhanumathi	3:01
