= Bengal Film Journalists' Association – Best Actor Award =

Annual Indian film award

This a list of the recipients of the Best Actor Award given by Bengal Film Journalists' Association.

Uttam Kumar and Soumitra Chatterjee are the most awarded actors, with eight wins each. Prosenjit Chatterjee won the award six times, and Sabyasachi Chakraborty, Mithun Chakraborty, Utpal Dutt, Victor Banerjee and Jeet had two wins each. The list below details the award winners and the films for which they received the award.

== Winners ==
=== 1940s ===
Year	Actor	Film	Role(s)	Ref.
1942	Pahari Sanyal	Pratishruti	Bipin	
1943	Jahar Ganguly	Bondi		
1945	Radhamohan Bhattacharya	Udayer Pathey	Anup	
1946	Devi Mukherjee	Bhabikal	Shibnath	

=== 1950s ===
Year	Actor	Film	Role(s)	Ref.
1952	Biren Chatterjee	Jighansa	Kumar Bahadur	
1953	Dhiraj Bhattacharya	Hanabari	Detective	
1955	Bikash Roy	Chheley Kaar	Kunal Sen	
1956	Uttam Kumar	Hrad	Banibrata	
1957	Raj Kapoor	Ekdin Ratre	Peasant	
1958	Chhabi Biswas	Sandhan	Kamalesh Batabyal	
1959	Kali Banerjee	Ajantrik	Bimal	

=== 1960s ===
Year	Actor	Film	Role(s)	Ref.
1960	Bhanu Banerjee	Nirdharito Shilpir Anupasthititey	Prahlad Chandra Bose	
1961	Soumitra Chatterjee	Teen Kanya	Amulya	
1962	Uttam Kumar	Saptapadi	Dr. Krishnendu Mukherjee	
1963	Soumitra Chatterjee	Abhijan	Narsingh	
1964	Anup Kumar	Palatak	Basanta Chatterjee	
1965	Shailen Mukherjee	Charulata	Bhupati Dutta	
1966	Basanta Choudhury	Raja Rammohan	Raja Ram Mohan Roy	
1967	Uttam Kumar	Nayak	Arindam Mukherjee	
1968	Uttam Kumar	Grihadaha	Mahim	
1969	Soumitra Chatterjee	Baghini	Chiranjib	

=== 1970s ===
Year	Actor	Film	Role(s)	Ref.
1970	Tapen Chatterjee	Goopy Gyne Bagha Byne	Goopy Gyne	
1971	Dilip Kumar	Sagina Mahato	Sagina Mahato	
1972	Uttam Kumar	Ekhane Pinjar	Amal	
1973	Uttam Kumar	Stree	Madhab Dutta	
1974	Soumitra Chatterjee	Ashani Sanket	Gangacharan Chakraborty	
1975	Uttam Kumar	Amanush	Madhu	
1976	Soumitra Chatterjee	Sansar Seemantey	Aghore	
1977	Uttam Kumar	Banhishikha	Bilash Ghosh	

=== 1980s ===
Year	Actor	Film	Role(s)	Ref.
1981	Dipankar De	Banchharamer Bagaan		
1982	Tapas Paul	Dadar Kirti	Kedar	
1986	Victor Banerjee	Ghare Baire	Nikhilesh Chowdhury	
1987	Soumitra Chatterjee	Kony	Kshitish Sinha	
1988	Sumanta Mukherjee	Nagpash	Nakul	
1989	Soumitra Chatterjee	Agni Sanket	Shyamal Banerjee	

=== 1990s ===
Year	Actor	Film	Role(s)	Ref.
1992	Utpal Dutt	Path O Prasad	Aditya Shekhar	
1993	Utpal Dutt	Agantuk	Manomohan Mitra	
1994	Anjan Dutt	Shilpi		
1995	Mithun Chakraborty	Tahader Katha	Shibnath	
1996	Sabyasachi Chakraborty	Kakababu Here Gelen?	Raja Roy Chowdhury / Kakababu	
1997	Victor Banerjee	Lathi	Atindramohan Banerjee	
1998	Debesh Roy Chowdhury	Kahini		
1999	Prosenjit Chatterjee	Tumi Ele Tai	Sushobhan	

=== 2000s ===
Year	Actor	Film	Role(s)	Ref.
2000	Prosenjit Chatterjee	Daay Dayittwo	Ranajoy Bose	
2001	Prosenjit Chatterjee	Aasroy	Sudhanshu	
2001	Prosenjit Chatterjee	Utsab	Arun	
2002	Arun Mukherjee	Mansur Miyar Ghora	Manusur Miya	
2003	Chiranjeet Chakraborty	Abaidha	Bimal Dutta	
2004	Prosenjit Chatterjee	Chokher Bali	Mahendra	
2005	Jeet	Bandhan	Rohit Banerjee	
2005	Sabyasachi Chakraborty	Mahulbanir Sereng	Somesh Gomes	
2006	Soumitra Chatterjee	Krantikaal	Pratap Chandra Sinha	
2007	Prosenjit Chatterjee	Dosar	Kaushik Chatterjee	
2007	Jeet	Kranti	Jeetendra Ghosh	

=== 2010s ===
Year	Actor	Film	Role(s)	Ref.
2012	Dev	Khokababu	Abir Sen	

== See also ==
- Bengal Film Journalists' Association Awards
- Cinema of India

== Bibliography ==
- Chowdhury, Ashok (1982). Paribartan.
