= Ekhane Aamar Swarga =

1990 Indian Bengali film

- Directed by: Jahar Biswas
- Produced by: K. C. N. Chandrashekhar
- Starring: Tapas Paul; Deepika Chikhalia
- Music by: R. D. Burman
- Release date: 1990
- Country: India
- Language: Bengali

Ekhane Aamar Swarga is a 1990 Bengali film directed by Jahar Biswas and produced by K. C. N. Chandrashekhar. The film's music was composed by R. D. Burman.

== Cast ==
- Soumitra Chatterjee
- Tapas Paul
- Deepika Chikhalia
- Ruma Guha Thakurta
- Sumitra Mukherjee
- Shakuntala Barua
