= Grihapravesh (1954 film) =

1954 film by Ajoy Kar

- Directed by: Ajoy Kar
- Screenplay by: Tulsi Lahiri
- Story by: Kanai Basu
- Starring: Suchitra Sen; Uttam Kumar; Bhanu Banerjee; Tulsi Chakraborty
- Music by: Mukul Roy
- Release date: 12 November 1954
- Running time: 116 minutes
- Country: India
- Language: Bengali

Grihapravesh is a Bengali drama film directed by Ajoy Kar. This movie was released on 12 Nov. 1954 under the banner of Naba Chitrabharati Ltd. The music direction was done by Mukul Roy. It stars Uttam Kumar, Suchitra Sen, Bhanu Banerjee, Tulsi Chakraborty, and Anil Chatterjee in the lead roles.

== Cast ==
- Suchitra Sen
- Uttam Kumar
- Anil Chatterjee
- Tulsi Chakraborty
- Bhanu Bannerjee
- Aparna Devi
- Nripati Chattopadhyay
- Asha Devi
- Molina Devi
- Pahari Sanyal
- Bikash Roy
- Jahar Ganguly
- Manju Dey
- Bijali Mukhopadhyay
- Khagen Pathak
