= Datta (1951 film) =

1951 Indian Bengali-language film

Datta is a 1951 Bengali romantic drama film directed by Soumyen Mukhopadhyay and released under the banner of S. B. Production. The film is based on the novel with the same name written by Sarat Chandra Chattopadhyay. The film was remade twice: in 1976 and later in 2023.

== Plot ==
Bijoya's father Banamali had informally engaged her to Naren, the son of his friend Jagdish. But Bijoya is attracted to Bilaas, son of another friend of Banamali. She has some hearsay knowledge about Naren and develops a negative image of Naren in her mind. But when she meets Naren, who is a doctor by profession the scenario starts changing. She starts to love Naren and realises that her conception about Naren is all wrong.

== Cast ==
- Sunanda Banerjee as Bijoya
- Purnendu Mukherjee as Naren
- Ahindra Choudhury as Rashbehari
- Jahar Ganguly as Bilas
- Anubha Gupta
- Kali Sarkar
- Sukhen Das

== Music ==
Timir Baran composed the music

== Remake ==
Year	Title	Director	Cast				
Year	Title	Director	Naren	Bijaya	Bilas	Rasbihari	Nalini
1976	Datta	Ajoy Kar	Soumitra Chatterjee	Suchitra Sen	Samit Bhanja	Utpal Dutt	Sumitra Mukherjee
