= Saat Pake Bandha =

1963 Indian Bengali film

- DVD cover
- Directed by: Ajoy Kar
- Story by: Ashutosh Mukherjee
- Produced by: R D Banshal
- Starring: Suchitra Sen; Soumitra Chatterjee; Chhaya Devi; Pahari Sanyal; Tarun Kumar; Gita Dey
- Cinematography: Bishnu Chakrabarty
- Music by: Hemanta Mukherjee
- Release date: 1963
- Running time: 125 minutes
- Country: India
- Language: Bengali

Saat Pake Bandha is a Bengali romantic film starring Soumitra Chatterjee, Suchitra Sen, Pahari Sanyal and Tarun Kumar. Directed by Ajoy Kar, it was a box office success upon its release. The movie was remade in 1963 in Telugu as Vivaha Bandham, in 1974 in Hindi as Kora Kagaz and in Tamil as Lalitha in 1976 and in Malayalam as Archana Teacher (1981).

== Plot ==
The story centres on Professor Sukhendu Dutta, who is played by Soumitra Chatterjee. An orphan from a poor background with a good education, he lives with his aunt in a small apartment in Kolkata. As well as his regular job at the university, he earns a living through private tuition. At a party held in honour of one of his students, he meets Archana Bose (Suchitra Sen), a well-educated woman from a wealthy family. They subsequently fall in love and marry. However, from the outset, Archana's mother disapproved of the marriage due to Sukhendu's low income. Ultimately, her intense interference in their lives led to their separation.

== Cast ==
- Soumitra Chatterjee as Sukhendu Dutta
- Suchitra Sen as Archana Basu
- Pahari Sanyal as Archana's Father
- Chhaya Devi as Archana's Mother
- Molina Devi as Sukhendu's Aunt

== Awards ==
Moscow International Film Festival

- Silver Prize for Best Actress: Suchitra Sen

11th National Film Awards – Saat Pake Bandha received a Certificate of Merit for 2nd best film in Bengali
