= Parineeta (1969 film) =

1969 Indian Bengali film

- Directed by: Ajoy Kar
- Written by: Sarat Chandra Chattopadhyay
- Produced by: Bimal Dey; Ajoy Kar
- Starring: Soumitra Chatterjee; Moushumi Chatterjee; Samit Bhanja
- Release date: 1969
- Country: India
- Language: Bengali

Parineeta is a 1969 Indian film by Ajoy Kar, which is an adaptation of Sarat Chandra Chattopadhyay's 1914 novel Parineeta. The English title for the film is The Fiancee. Parineeta takes place at the turn of the 20th century during the Bengal Renaissance.

== Plot ==
The story centers around a poor thirteen-year-old orphan girl, Lalita, who lives with the family of her uncle Gurucharan. Gurucharan has five daughters, and the expense of paying for their weddings has impoverished him. He is forced to take a loan from his neighbour, Nabin Roy, by mortgaging a plot of land with him. The two neighbouring families share a very cordial relationship, although Nabin Roy does covet Gurucharan's mortgaged plot. Nabin Roy's wife, Bhuvaneshwari, dotes on the orphan Lalita and showers love upon her; the latter reciprocates even to the extent of addressing Bhuvaneshwari as 'maa'(mother). Roy's younger son Shekharnath (Shekhar), a 25-26-year-old man-about-town, lately turned attorney, has a joking, bantering relationship with Lalita, his mother's protégée. The young girl adores him like her mentor, and for some strange reasons, ratifies and accepts his possessive attitude towards her. The advent of a supportive Girin in Lalita's life, a certain jealousy transpired within Shekhar which tended to moderate Lalita's increasing associations with Girin who has now extended his helping hand to Gurucharan's finances and also assisted him in finding a match for Lalita. These situations seemed to stir the instinctual passions of Shekhar and somewhat Lalita for each other and one evening before Shekhar's tour to the west, the duo secretly gets married with a dramatic exchange of garlands formed of marigolds. But a newly married Lalita had to conceal herself in the veil of her spinsterhood as her uncle Gurucharan quits his fight with the law and orders of Hindu society and embraces Brahmoism inspired from the angelic words of Girin. The society abandons them and the same is followed by Shekhar towards Lalita upon his return (though mixed with covetousness over Girin's influence on her family). His jeopardies in introducing his wife amidst the society because of the differences in wealth, religion and more importantly due to a precluded marriage of marrying an under-aged woman made him harsh and arrogant towards Lalita who drowned in agony, decides to accompany her family to Munger as a means of healing her psychologically tormented uncle anguished by the sense of isolation. Girin aided them all through his journey to whom Gurucharan had his dying wish of marrying his daughter (suggestively indicated to his niece Lalita) which Girin accepts wholeheartedly.

Years pass with the passing of both Gurucharan and Nabin Roy and an eighteen year old Lalita visits her old place one last time for the sake of selling Gurucharan's house to Nabin Roy's heirs since the deceased desired the plot for a long time. Shekhar has his marriage fixed in a week but Lalita's advent questions him over his real wishes but he has heard of Girin's promise to marry Lalita which must have been fulfilled by now. Tables turn as Girin visits Shekhar with the Legal documents of Gurucharan's plot and amidst the conversation reveals that he indeed became Gurucharan's son-in-law as per his promise but never married Lalita but married her cousin Annakali upon her suggestion as Lalita claimed herself to be already married. Shockingly pleased by this, Shekhar regains himself and his now realised love for Lalita goes to his mother and confesses about his marriage with Lalita. The novella ends with consent for this marriage a declaration of union for Shekhar and Lalita.

== Cast ==
- Soumitra Chatterjee as Shekhar
- Moushumi Chatterjee as Lalita
- Samit Bhanja as Girin
- Kamal Mitra as Nahin Roy
- Gita Dey as Mamima
- Chhaya Devi as Bhubaneswari Devi
- Anubha Gupta as Charus Mother
- Bijon Bhattacharya
- Shailen Mukherjee
- Bankim Ghosh
