= Saptapadi (1961 film) =

- Theatrical release poster
- Directed by: Ajoy Kar
- Written by: Tarasankar Bandyopadhyay
- Screenplay by: Ajoy Kar
- Based on: Saptapadi novel by Tarasankar Bandyopadhyay
- Produced by: Uttam Kumar
- Starring: Suchitra Sen; Uttam Kumar; Chhabi Biswas; Chaya Debi
- Cinematography: Kanai De, Ajoy Kar
- Edited by: Ardhendu Chatterjee; Amiya Mukherjee
- Music by: Hemanta Mukherjee
- Production company: Alochaya Production
- Distributed by: Chayabani Productions Pvt Ltd
- Release date: 20 October 1961
- Running time: 163 minutes
- Country: India
- Language: Bengali
- Budget: est. 8 million
- Box office: 100 million.

Ei poth jodi na sesh hoy (duet) - Bengali movie song from Saptapadi (1961) (If this path has no end)
Lyricist Gauriprasanna Mazumder, composer Hemanta Mukhopadhyay, singer Hemanta Mukhopadhyay and Sandhya Mukhopadhyay

Saptapadi (transl. Seven Steps) is a 1961 Indian Bengali-language epic romantic drama film by Ajoy Kar, starring Suchitra Sen, Uttam Kumar, Chhabi Biswas and Chhaya Debi. Music direction and playback singing for Kumar's voice was by Hemanta Mukherjee and in Sen's voice by Sandhya Mukherjee. The story is based on a 1958 same name novel by Tarasankar Bandyopadhyay. This is regarded as one of the greatest romantic films in the history of Bengali cinema. The film went on to become the highest grossing Bengali film in 1961. It was featured retrospectively at the 45th IFFI in the "homage section" of Indian panorama.

== Plot ==
Set in pre-independence India in the early 1940s, the story follows young Indian students competing equally with Anglo-Indians in all fields, from education to sports. The protagonist, Krishnendu Mukherjee, is a young Bengali Hindu medical student who falls in love with an equally talented Anglo-Indian Christian woman named Rina Brown. They are both students at Calcutta Medical College and grow close while attending many sporting and cultural events together. There is an interesting rendition of Othello in the film, directed by Utpal Dutt. However, marriage is out of the question due to their different religions. Krishnendu's father, a staunch, conservative Hindu, particularly opposes it, and the couple go their separate ways, only to meet again unexpectedly later in life. Most of the film is presented in flashbacks, with Krishnendu pondering the past after he unexpectedly encounters a drunk and unconscious Rina in a military hospital.

== Cast ==
- Uttam Kumar as Krishnendu
- Suchitra Sen as Rina Brown
- Chhabi Biswas as Krishnendu's Father
- Chhaya Devi as Rina's maid
- Tarun Kumar as Krishnendu's friend
- Utpal Dutt as Othello (voice-over)
- Jennifer Kapoor as Desdemona (voice-over)
- Dean Gasper as Rina Brown's British suitor
- Padma Devi as Krishnendu's mother

== Production ==
=== Development ===
Saptapadi is a reunion of Kumar and Ajay Kar with their production house Alochaya Productions after the mammoth success of Harano Sur. The film was adapted from Tarashankar's 1958 novel Saptapadi. Kumar was impressed with the story and thus, bought the rights of the novel. The plot was set during the Second World war in 1942 with flashback scenes narrating the past events. In the novel's ending Krishendu dies, but for the sake of the audiences, the production team decided to change the film's ending so that Krishnendu doesn't die and instead, reunites with Rina Brown. At first, Tarashankar did not agree to this drastic change in the ending. However, the maker had to convince him as the Bengali audience was not yet sophisticated enough to accept a sad ending and the separation of Uttam and Suchitra.

=== Casting ===
Suchitra Sen was finalized for the film as expected. However, she demanded a high salary of 100,000 rupees, which was far above the standard compensation at the time. After negotiations with the production team, she ultimately agreed to reduce her fee. There were also rumors of an ego clash between Kumar and Sen during this period.

=== Filming ===
Shooting commenced in late 1959. But during the production Uttam's father dies. So film shooting was stopped. Later in late 1960 shooting started again but Kumar busy with other films and Sen also a busy artists so there lack of days to shoot, finally the film shooting completed in 1961. For the film Kumar and Sen practiced dance and reading Shakespeare. The Othello play scene in the film had Kumar's voice-over by Utpal Dutta and Sen's voice-over by Jennifer Kapoor.

Kumar was a Mohun Bagan football fan, and in the football match scene he wanted to play in a Mohun Bagan jersey, but there was none available so he don't want to shoot the scene. Sen who was an East Bengal fan hearing this she forced to him to shoot either she leaved the film. So Kumar played instead in an East Bengal jersey.

The famous bike sequence from the song Ei Path Jodi Na Sesh Hoy Uttam and Suchitra did not ride the bike at all that day. The BMW bike on which this song was shot was not on the star duo ar all. Film critic Swapan Kumar Mallick unearths the famous scene in his book Mahanayak Revisited : The World of Uttam Kumar said the director Ajay Kar manipulated the close-up shots to shoot the bike scene. Multiple dummies were used in long shots. Uttam Suchitra didn't ride that BMW bike.

== Music ==
Saptapadi

Soundtrack album by Hemant Kumar
- Released: 1961
- Recorded: 1961
- Studio: Alochaya Productions Private Limited
- Genre: Feature film soundtrack
- Length: 0:11:11
- Label: Sa Re Ga Ma
- Producer: Uttam Kumar

Hemant Kumar chronology
Punashcha (1961)	Saptapadi (1961)	Sathi Hara (1961)
External audio
- Audio Jukebox on YouTube

Saptapadi's music was directed by Hemant Kumar, with lyrics by Gauriprasanna Mazumder. The song "Ei Path Jodi Na" was sung by Hemanta for Kumar and by Sandhya for Sen.

=== Soundtrack ===
Track	Title	Artist	Lyricist	Notes
1	Ei Poth Jodi Na Shesh Hoy (If This Path Does Not End)	Hemant Kumar and Sandhya Mukherjee	Gauriprasanna Mazumder	
2	Ei Poth Jodi Na Shesh Hoy (If This Path Does Not End)	Sandhya Mukherjee	Gauriprasanna Mazumder	Repeated. Sandhya Mukherjee's solo
3	On The Merry Go Round	Suzi Miller	Gauriprasanna Mazumder	

== Release ==
During the advance booking there was long queue and police lathi charged for the craze. The film was released at Durga Puja on 20 October 1961. There was huge craze for the film because this was the comeback of Uttam-Suchitra pair more than two years after Chaoa Pawa in 1959. The film was released with another Kumar film Dui Bhai.

Saptapadi entered in Moscow Film Festival in July 1963 with English subtitle as Seven Steps and nominated for Grand Pix Award.

== Reception ==
=== Reviews ===
Saptapadi got reviews from both critics and audiences. Many people think it is one of the romantic films, in Bengali cinema. It still draws in viewers from generations.

In an article of 2021 Get Bengal wrote that Saptapadi was not only a romantic masterpiece but it's a message to the hated. In today's times of widening religious divides, this film is an essential reminder of the hollowness and damage-causing potential of bigotry, and the healing power of love.

As per the 2019 article by The Print, it is evident that the issues depicted in the movie continue to be relevant even in the wake of reports of threats to couples who get married beyond their faiths.

=== Box office ===
The film was massive success at the box office and breaking all the previous records. It's become all-time blockbuster and ran for 105 days in theater and collected over four times more from the budget. The film become highest grossing Bengali film in 1961. At the same time Dui Bhai was released which starring also Uttam, that also become superhit.

== Awards ==
- 9th National Film Awards, 1961: Certificate of Merit for Second Best Feature Film in Bengali
- 1962: BFJA Award for Best Actor – Uttam Kumar
- 1962: BFJA Award for Best Actress – Suchitra Sen
- 1963: Grand Prix [Nominee] for Ajoy Kar at Moscow International Film Festival (1963)

== Legacy ==
"Ei Poth Jodi Na Shesh Hoy" has a place in the history of Bengali cinema as a timeless romantic classic. The unforgettable motorcycle scene has become one of the famous romantic moments, on screen. The song continues to be loved by Bengali audiences. It remains popular at gatherings and public events.

It was featured retrospectively at the 45th IFFI in the "homage section" of Indian panorama, 2014. Inaugural Film at 31st Kolkata International Film Festival (KIFF), 2025.
