= Bengali film directory =

Archive of Bengali films

Bengali Film Directory
- Cover page of Bengali Film Directory
- Author: Ansu Sur
- Language: English
- Genre: Directory
- Publisher: Nandan; West Bengal Film Centre(Calcutta)
- Publication date: 1999
- Publication place: India
- Media type: Print (Hardback)
- Pages: 319

Bengali Film Directory is an archive of Bengali films (in English). Published in March 1999 by Nandan, West Bengal Film Centre (Calcutta), this directory was edited by Ansu Sur and was compiled by Abhijit Goswami. It includes all Bengali feature films released from 1917 to 1998, described briefly, but including detailed cast and crew, director name, release date and release theater name.

== Contents ==
- Acknowledgements iv
- A Note from the Editor v
- Reference vi
- Abbreviations vii
- Filmography
  - Silent era 1
  - Sound era 9
- Studios and Post-Production Centres 267
- Production Companies 269
- Distributions 271
- Show-houses 274
- Useful Addresses 277
- Film Societies 278
- Film Journals 280
- Film Books 281
- Index
  - Films 285
  - Directors 298
  - Actors and Actresses 303
- Appendix: Films released in 1998 315

== See also ==
- Lists of Indian films § Bengali
