= Agradani =

1983 Indian Bengali film

Agradani is a Bengali social drama film directed and produced by Palash Bannerjee based on a same name story of Bengali novelist Tarashankar Bandopadhyay. This film was released in 1983 under the banner of Palash Bandyopadhyay Productions.

== Plot ==
There is a particular class of Brahmins called Agradani, who are to be chosen to perform the eating rituals on behalf of the dead. Punyo Chakraborty, a poor man, belongs to the Agradani community and lives with his family in a village. Local zamindar promises him to provide land and money if Punyo lies down in front of the room where Zamindar's son is going to be born. In the morning Punyo watches that zamindar's wife gave birth to a dead child, soon he replaces the dead son with his new born baby. The baby grown ups as zamindar's son. Only Punyo knows that he is the biological father of the boy. One day circumstances come where he is forced to perform the funeral rituals for his own son.

== Cast ==
- Soumitra Chatterjee as Punyo Chakraborty
- Anil Chatterjee as Zamindar
- Sandhya Roy
- Chhaya Devi
- Prasenjit Chatterjee
- Sumitra Mukherjee
- Bimal Deb
- Nimai Ghosh
