= Podokkhep =

- DVD cover of Podokkhep
- Directed by: Suman Ghosh
- Starring: Soumitra Chatterjee; Nandita Das
- Release date: 18 July 2006
- Running time: 93 minutes
- Country: India
- Language: Bengali

Podokkhep (Bengali: পদক্ষেপ "Footstep") is a 2006 Bengali film directed by Suman Ghosh.

== Plot ==
In the end, the only love which lasts is the love that has accepted everything, every disappointment, every failure and every betrayal, and which has accepted even the sad fact that in the end there is no desire as deep as the simple desire for companionship."

Inspired by this Graham Greene quote, "Podokkhep" is the story of an unusual bond between a retired man and a 5-year-old girl where he rediscovers life in his twilight years through this friendship.

== Cast ==
- Soumitra Chatterjee as Shashanka Palit
- Nandita Das as Megha, Shashanka's daughter
- Sabitri Chatterjee as Shobita, Shashanka and Megha's house help
- Tota Roy Choudhury as Debjit, Shashanka & Megha's neighbour
- June Malia as Seema, Debjit's wife
- Sweta Dutta
- Bibhas Chakraborty as Sunil Bhattacharya, Shashanka's old friend
- Jagannath Guha
- Ashok Sharma

== Awards ==
2006 National Film Awards (India)

- Won - Silver Lotus Award - Best Actor - Soumitra Chatterjee
- Won - Best Feature Film in Bengali - Suman Ghosh
