= Akash Kusum =

1965 Indian Bengali film

- Poster of Akash Kusum
- Directed by: Mrinal Sen
- Written by: Ashish Barman
- Produced by: Purbachal Film Productions
- Starring: Soumitra Chatterjee; Aparna Sen; Subhendu Chatterjee
- Cinematography: Sailaja Chatterjee
- Edited by: Gangadhar Naskar
- Music by: Sudhin Dasgupta
- Release date: 1965
- Country: India
- Language: Bengali

Akash Kusum (lit. "Up in the Clouds") is a 1965 Indian Bengali film directed by noted Indian parallel film director Mrinal Sen. The film was loosely remade in Hindi as Manzil (1979).

== Plot ==
It is the story of the longings of a middle-class executive to rise in stature and social acceptability. The young man trying to find a place in the corporate world innocently bluffs a young girl he chances upon. The bluff becomes disastrous for him, and for their relationship.

== Cast ==
- Soumitra Chatterjee as Ajay
- Aparna Sen as Manika
- Subhendu Chatterjee
- Haradhan Bandopadhyay
