= Malyadan =

- Directed by: Ajoy Kar
- Written by: Rabindranath Tagore (original story)
- Produced by: Ajoy Kar and Bimal Dey
- Starring: Soumitra Chatterjee, Sabitri Chatterjee, Nandini Maliya
- Music by: Hemanta Mukherjee
- Release date: 1971
- Country: India
- Language: Bengali

Malyadan (also Malyadaan; English: The Garlanding, also The Wedding Garland) is a 1971 Bengali film directed by Ajoy Kar, based on a short story by Rabindranath Tagore, and starring Soumitra Chatterjee, Sabitri Chatterjee and Nandini Maliya in the lead roles. Tagore's story tells a tragic tale of innocent love. At the 18th National Film Awards, the film won the National Film Award for Best Feature Film in Bengali.

== Plot ==
Jatin, a young doctor, visits his sister during his vacation. On his way, he glanced a girl adoring a rabbit. At home, Jatin is constantly nagged by his cousin Patal to get married. She introduces him to a teenage girl, Kurani, who happens to be the same girl Jatin previously came across. Kurani is an orphan who survived the famine and was rescued and cured by Patal and Harakumarbabu and since then is raised by this childless couple. Kurani is innocent and lacking in worldly senses. When Patal playfully asks her if she likes Jatin and if she will marry him, Kurani replies in the affirmative. Jatin is embarrassed and intends to keep himself away from this childliness. He refuses to accept a garland offered by Kurani and becomes angry with Patal, who believes that there is nothing wrong, because Kurani is like a doe of the woods. Jatin leaves with a note to her sister, leaving behind the garland too. This leaves Kurani heartbroken and she breaks into deep tears. Patal is struck with remorse when she realises that Kurani has actually fallen in love with Jatin. Next morning, it is discovered that Kurani has disappeared, leaving behind all ornaments and dresses she has had and only with the garland of dry flowers with her. They search for Kurani in all likely places, but she is nowhere to be found. Subsequently, Jatin while working in his Plague hospital, finds that Kurani is admitted there as an unknown patient in an extremely weak and emaciated condition. Jatin's heart feels the love finally and he caresses the girl. He takes her to his home and informs Patal. In the climax, Jatin confesses his love to Kurani and asks a dying Kurani to put her garland around his neck, in presence of Patal. Patal dresses Kurani as bride and Kurani's neverspoken dream comes true at least before her departure from this material world.

== Cast ==
- Soumitra Chatterjee as Jatin
- Nandini Maliya as Kurani
- Sabitri Chatterjee as Patal
- Sailen Gangopadhyay as Harakumarbabu
- Bhanu Bannerjee as Dhana Malee
- Gita Dey as Dhana's wife
- Bikash Roy as Senior Doctor in hospital

== Crew ==
- Direction—Ajoy Kar
- Production—Ajoy Kar and Bimal Dey
- Music -- Hemanta Mukhopadhyay

== Reception ==
The film was well received when released, both commercially and critically. Apart from the National Award, it won two BFJA Awards. Subsequently. it seems to have been almost forgotten, although a track containing a Tagore song, sung by Hemanta Mukherjee, still endures.

The film must be remembered for its portrayal of the characters, a successful thematic representation of the essence of the story. This is one of the many movie adaptions of Tagore stories. Though the dialogues which are taken from the story are kept in ditto without any necessary modifications needed to turn a written form into a colloquial form, but on the other hand the added and extended part, especially the portion of 'Dhana Malee and his wife' has been drawn and presented by actors Bhanu Bandopadhyay and Gita Dey.

Sabitri Chatterjee, not only with her dialogues but altogether with her acting skill did proper justification to the role of Patal while Soumitra Chatterjee is perfect also as Jatin.

Hemanta Mukherjee's music creates the tone- romantic, haunting and melancholic. The 'dream sequence' should be perhaps one of the best dream sequences, which reminds of 'Chitrangada' and the associated background score is indeed a masterpiece. In two scenes, the character of Kurani merges with two other Tagore characters- 'Pupedidi' (where she feeds the rabbits the cauliflower-leaves) and 'Mini' (where she says to Dhana- 'tumi kicchu jano na').

== Preservation ==
Malyadan has been restored and digitised by the National Film Archives of India.

== Awards ==
- 18th National Film Awards -- National Film Award for Best Feature Film in Bengali
- BFJA Awards 1972—Best Indian Films
- BFJA Awards 1972—Best Supporting Actress Sabitri Chatterjee
