= Distant Thunder (1973 film) =

1973 Indian film by Satyajit Ray

Ashani Sanket
- A poster for Ashani Sanket
- Directed by: Satyajit Ray
- Screenplay by: Satyajit Ray
- Based on: Ashani Sanket by Bibhutibhushan Bandopadhyay
- Starring: Soumitra Chatterjee; Bobita; Sandhya Roy; Monu Mukherjee
- Cinematography: Soumendu Roy
- Edited by: Dulal Dutta
- Music by: Satyajit Ray
- Production company: Balaka Movies
- Distributed by: Nanda Bhattacharya
- Release dates: June 1973 (Berlin); 16 August 1973 (India)
- Running time: 101 minutes
- Country: India
- Language: Bengali

Distant Thunder (translit. Ashani Sanket) is a 1973 Indian Bengali film by director Satyajit Ray, based on a novel by Bibhutibhushan Bandopadhyay. Unlike most of Ray's earlier films, Distant Thunder was filmed in colour. It stars Soumitra Chatterjee, who headlined numerous Ray films, and the Bangladeshi actress Bobita in her only prominent international role. Today the film features in The New York Times Guide to the Best 1,000 Movies Ever Made. It marked the debut of the theatre star Mrityunjay Sil.

== Overview ==
The film is set in a village in the Indian province of Bengal during World War II, and examines the effect of the Great Famine of 1943 on the villages of Bengal through the eyes of a young Brahmin doctor-teacher, Gangacharan, and his wife, Angana. Ray shows the human scale of a cataclysmic event that killed more than 3 million people. The film unfolds at a leisurely pace that reflects the rhythms of village life, but gradually shows the breakdown of traditional village norms under the pressure of hunger and starvation.

== Cast ==
- Soumitra Chatterjee as Gangacharan Chakravarti
- Bobita as Angana, Gangacharan's wife
- Chitra Banerjee as Moti
- Govinda Chakravarti as Dinabandhu
- Anil Ganguly as Nibaran
- Noni Ganguly as Scarface' Jadu
- Debatosh Ghosh as Adhar
- Ramesh Mukherjee as Biswas
- Sheli Pal as Mokshada
- Suchita Ray Chaudhury as Khenti
- Sandhya Roy as Chutki
- Mrityunjay Sil as Ajay (Cameo)

== Reception ==
Vincent Canby of The New York Times called the film "moving" and "elegiac". He remarks that the film "has the impact of an epic without seeming to mean to" and noted various connections with Ray's own Apu Trilogy (in its casting of Chatterjee and in it being an adaptation of another Bibhutibhushan Bandopadhyay novel). "It is, however, very different from those early films" he writes, "It is the work of a director who has learned the value of narrative economy to such an extent that 'Distant Thunder,' which is set against the backdrop of the 'manmade' famine that wiped out 5 million people in 1943, has the simplicity of a fable." Tom Milne of Time Out calls the film "[d]istant thunder, indeed; a superb film." Dennis Schwartz gave the film an A− and called it "[a] gentle humanist film that informs the world that over five million died of starvation and epidemics in Bengal." Jay Cocks writing for Time echoes Canby's assessment of it as a "fable", writing: "Distant Thunder has the deliberate, unadorned reality of a folk tale, a fable of encroaching, enlarging catastrophe." He calls the film "superb and achingly simple ... Numbers as huge as ["5 million"] can be dangerous. A tragedy of such magnitude becomes an event abstracted by arithmetic. But Ray's artistry alters the scale. His concentrating on just a few victims of the famine causes such massive loss to become real, immediate. Ray makes numbers count."

=== Legacy ===
In 2012, filmmaker Amit Dutta included the film in his personal top ten (for "The Sight & Sound Top 50 Greatest Films of All Time" poll).

== Awards ==
Berlin International Film Festival

- 1973: Golden Bear for Best Film

21st National Film Awards

- National Film Award for Best Feature Film in Bengali - Ashani Sanket
- National Film Award for Best Music Direction - Satyajit Ray
- National Film Award for Best Cinematography - Soumendu Roy
