= Ganashatru =

1990 Indian film

- Directed by: Satyajit Ray
- Written by: Henrik Ibsen (play); Satyajit Ray
- Starring: Soumitra Chatterjee; Ruma Guha Thakurta; Mamata Shankar; Dhritiman Chatterjee; Bhishma Guhathakurta; Deepankar De; Subhendu Chatterjee; Manoj Mitra
- Cinematography: Barun Raha
- Edited by: Dulal Dutta
- Music by: Satyajit Ray
- Production company: NFDC
- Release dates: 11 May 1989 (Cannes); 19 January 1990 (India)
- Running time: 100 minutes
- Country: India
- Language: Bengali

Ganashatru (Gônoshotru Enemy of the People/ Public Enemy) is a 1989 Indian film directed by Satyajit Ray. It is an adaptation of Henrik Ibsen's 1882 play An Enemy of the People, and was released under that title in the UK. The cast includes Ray's favourite actor Soumitra Chatterjee, and veteran actors such as Dhritiman Chatterjee, Shubhendu Chatterjee, Manoj Mitra and Ruma Guhathakurta. Ray adapts the play to an Indian setting: a flourishing township in which a temple attracts devotees as well as tourists. When a health problem is discovered, Dr Ashok Gupta, played by Soumitra Chatterjee, finds his popularity flagging. The film was screened out of competition at the 1989 Cannes Film Festival.

== Plot ==
Ashok Gupta, played by Soumitra Chatterjee, an honest doctor, diagnoses the alarming spread of jaundice among his patients. To identify the cause, he analyses the water of a populated part of his town, Chandipur. According to the report, the holy water (charanamrita) of the Tripureshwar temple, a famous temple and tourist attraction of the town, is found to be contaminated due to damage to the underground piping system.

The temple was the source of income for all of the corrupt politicians. Among these politicians is Dr. Gupta's younger brother, Nishith Gupta, portrayed by Dhritiman Chatterjee, who is also the chairman of the municipality. He and other beneficiaries of the temple decide to prevent the doctor from alerting the people.

As a responsible member of the society, the doctor tries to broadcast the fact of contamination to the people, proposing temporary closure of the temple for water purification. However, the Chairman is absolutely against this idea as it tampers with their profits. They are not ready to accept scientific evidence and instead says charanamrita can never be contaminated because it is holy.

He also tries to publish an essay in a local daily newspaper (Janabarta) on the topic. But the corrupt officials suppress his voice. The newspaper rejects his essay, fearing political pressure and public rage.

As the story progresses, Dr. Gupta even tries to convey his message in a public meeting. Unfortunately, it is infiltrated and disrupted by his brother and his associates. The Chairman is able to manipulate the community against the doctor's attempts to save it. He faces a widespread angry response and goes from being a leader of the society to an enemy of the people. Dr. Gupta loses his job in the local hospital and his daughter is terminated from her post of a teacher. The landlord asks them to move out.

However, at the end of the movie Dr. Gupta gets justice. The young educated population of the town sides with him while his son-in-law's theatre troupe campaigns for him. The assistant editor of Janabarta quits his job to side with him and sends his writings and interview to top newspapers in Kolkata. The film ends with Gupta family deciding to stay in Chandipur, amidst a shout of "Long Live Dr. Ashok Gupta!" around him.

== Cast ==
- Soumitra Chatterjee as Ashok Gupta
- Ruma Guha Thakurta as Maya Gupta
- Mamata Shankar as Indrani Gupta
- Dhritiman Chatterjee as Nishith Gupta
- Bhishma Guhathakurta as Ranen Halder
- Deepankar De as Haridas Bagchi
- Subhendu Chatterjee as Biresh Guha
- Manoj Mitra as Adhir Mukherjee

== Awards ==
37th National Film Awards

- National Film Award for Best Feature Film in Bengali - Ganashatru
