= Teen Bhubaner Pare =

1969 Indian Bengali-language film

Teen Bhubaner Paare
- Directed by: Ashutosh Bandyopadhyay
- Produced by: Satirtha Productions
- Starring: Soumitra Chatterjee; Tanuja
- Music by: Sudhin Dasgupta
- Release date: 31 December 1969 (India)
- Running time: 126 minutes
- Country: India
- Language: Bengali

Teen Bhubaner Paare is a 1969 Indian Bengali movie directed by Ashutosh Bandyopadhyay. It is inspired from Samaresh Basu's eponymous novel released in 1969. "Hoyto Tomari Jonno" and "Jibone Ki Pabo Na", sung by Manna Dey, have achieved lasting popularity among Bengali listeners. The film became a commercial and critical success.

== Cast ==
- Soumitra Chatterjee as Subir Mitra / Montu
- Tanuja as Sarasi Roy
- Rabi Ghosh as Jayanta, Montu's friend
- Chinmoy Roy as Montu's friend
- Tarun Kumar Chatterjee as Nanda
- Sumita Sanyal as Heena
- Ashok Mitra as Bireshwar Roy: Sarasi's elder brother
- Sulata Chowdhury as Mrs. Roy, Bireshwar's wife
- Padma Devi as Bireshwar and Sarasi's mother
- Aparna Devi as Montu's mother
- Subrata Chatterjee as Kalyani, Sarasi's friend
- Shailen Ganguly as Montu's father
- Kamal Mitra
- Arup Basu
- Shyamal Chatterjee
- Sukumar Ghosh
