= Ajoy Kar =

Indian film director (1914–1985)

- Born: 27 March 1914; Calcutta, Bengal Presidency, British India
- Died: 25 January 1985 (aged 70); Calcutta, West Bengal, India
- Occupations: Cinematographer, film director
- Years active: 1937–1983
- Known for: Saptapadi; Atal Jaler Ahwan; Saat Pake Bandha; Malyadan; Datta

Ajoy Kar (Bengali:অজয় কর; 27 March 1914 – 25 January 1985) was an Indian film director and cinematographer who is known for his Classic film,Saptapadi (1960). He directed 26 films between 1949 and 1983. His 1961 film Saptapadi was entered into the 3rd Moscow International Film Festival. Ajoy Kar provided a whole new expression to Bengali cinema. He was a Pioneer of Bengali Romantic Drama.Saptapadi retrospectively at the 45th International Film Festival of India in the "homage section" of Indian panorama. His 1971 film Malyadan won the National Film Award for Best Feature Film in Bengali. Kar made Harano Sur which film was based on 1942 Oscar nominated film Random Harvest which itself based on the novel of same name written by James Hilton.His contemporary filmmakers are Satyajit Ray, Tapan Sinha, Asit Sen, Tarun Majumdar. Alongside, Guru Dutt in Bollywood.

== Early life ==
Kar was born on 27 March 1914, in Calcutta, British India. He left college in 1931 to become a professional photographer, and took up cinematography a few years later.

== Career ==
After initially working as an assistant to Jatin Das, Kar became a cinematographer at Indrapuri Studios, Calcutta, in 1938. Over the next four decades, he shot more than 80 feature films. He also shot a number of documentary films.

Kar's first film as director was Ananya (1949), made by the Sabyasachi collective launched by Kanan Devi. The first film for which he received individual directorial credit was Bamuner Meye (1949). During the 1950s and early 1960s, he emerged as a key figure in mainstream Bengali cinema, with a string of commercially successful films such as Shyamali (1956), Harano Sur (1957), Saptapadi (1961) and Saat Pake Bandha (1963). Of these, Harano Sur and Saptapadi involved the popular romantic pair of Uttam Kumar and Suchitra Sen. These films also received critical acclaim.

== Filmmaking style ==
From the late 1960s onwards, Kar made a number of films which were adaptations of well-known literary works, especially those by Rabindranath Tagore and Sarat Chandra Chatterjee. Some of these are Parineeta (1969), Malyadan, Datta (1976) and Naukadubi (1979). In all, he directed 26 films, the last being Bishabriksha (1984 film). He was influenced by western literature and western Movie. His spectacular camera work created him a Different Personality than other Bengali Filmmakers.

== Legacy ==
Malyadan and Saat Pake Bandha has been restored and digitised by the National Film Archives of India. Goutam Ghose says that Mrinal Sen was compelled to write scripts for directors like Ajay Kar’s Kanch Kata Heera.His works impact and influence on South Indian filmmakers like C. V. Sridhar and P. S. Ramakrishna Rao. and Bollywood filmmaker like Anil Ganguly and Partially influence on Bengali Filmmaker like Tarun Majumdar

== Awards and honours ==
- 18th National Film Awards – Malyadan won the National Film Award for Best Feature Film in Bengali.
- 5th National Film Awards – Harano Sur received a Certificate of Merit for 3rd best film in Bengali
- 9th National Film Awards – Saptapadi received a Certificate of Merit for 2nd best film in Bengali
- Saptapadi was homage at International Film Festival of India, 2022
- 11th National Film Awards – Saat Pake Bandha received a Certificate of Merit for 2nd best film in Bengali
- BFJA Awards 1972—Best Indian Films for Malyadan.
- Silver Prize for Best Actress: Suchitra Sen at Moscow International Film Festival for Saat Pake Bandha.
- Grand Prix [Nominee] for Ajoy Kar at Moscow International Film Festival, (1963) for Saptapadi.

== Selected filmography ==
- Ananya (1949)
- Bamuner Meye (1949)
- Jighansa (1951)
- Darpachurna (1952)
- Grihapravesh (1954)
- Sajghar (1955)
- Paresh (1955)
- Shyamali (1956)
- Harano Sur (1957)
- Bardidi (1957)
- Khelaghar (1959)
- Suno Baranari (1960)
- Saptapadi (1961)
- Atal Jaler Ahwan (1962)
- Barnali (1963)
- Saat Pake Bandha (1963)
- Prabhater Rang (1964)
- Kanch Kata Hirey (1965)
- Parineeta (1969)
- Malyadan (1971)
- Kayahiner Kahini (1973)
- Datta (1976)
- Naukadubi (1979)
- Madhuban (1983)
- Bishabriksha (1984 film)

== See also ==
- Asit Sen
- Arabinda Mukhopadhyay
- Raj Chakraborty
- Sujit Mondal
- Birsa Dasgupta
