= Soumitra Chatterjee =

Indian actor (1935–2020)

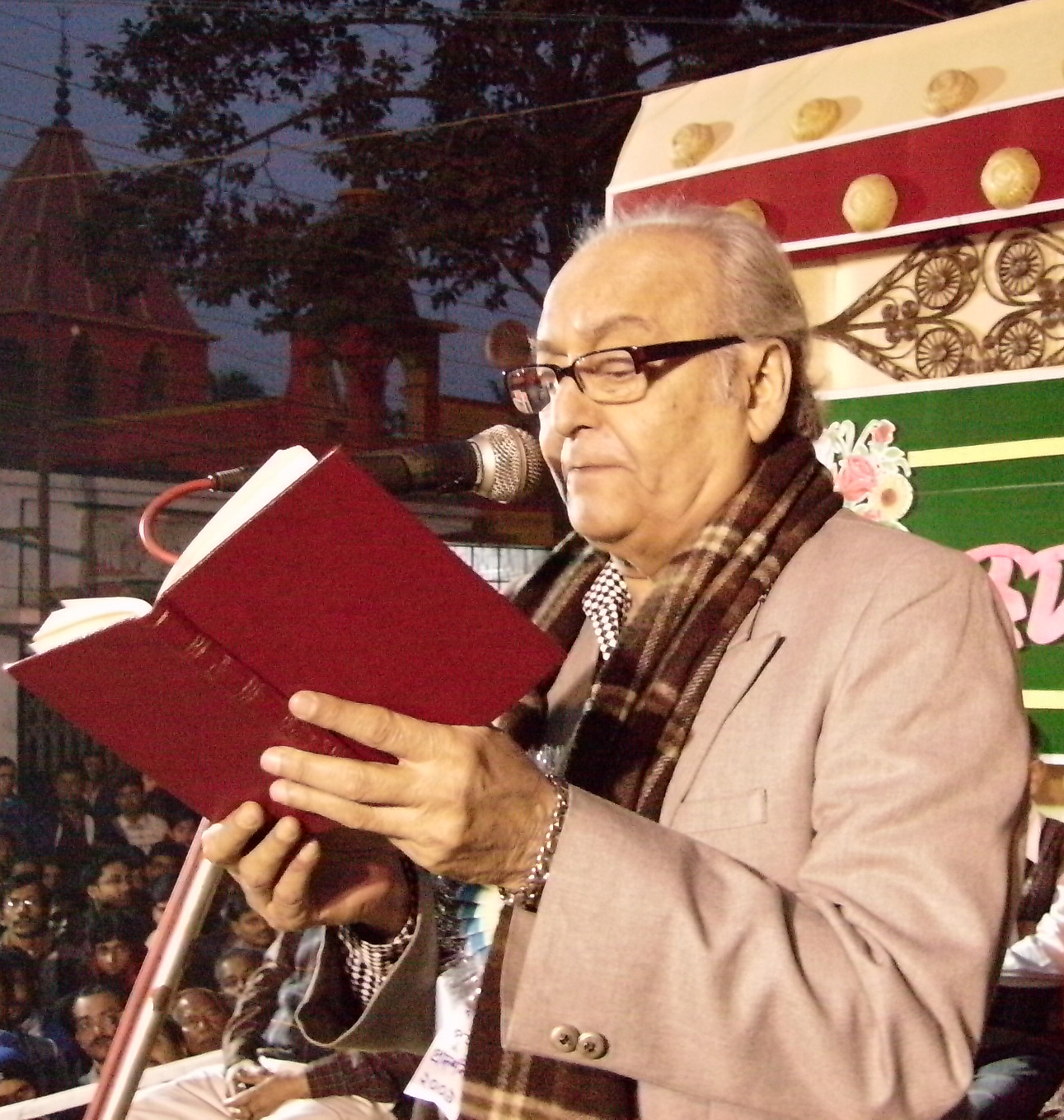
- Chatterjee reciting a poem by Tagore at an event
- Born: Soumitra Chattopadhyay; 19 January 1935; Calcutta, Bengal Presidency, British India
- Died: 15 November 2020 (aged 85); Bhowanipore, Kolkata, West Bengal, India
- Education: University of Calcutta
- Occupations: Actor, poet, writer, playwright, theatre director
- Years active: 1959–2020
- Works: Filmography
- Spouse: Deepa Chatterjee (m. 1960)
- Children: 2
- Awards: Padma Bhushan (2004); Dadasaheb Phalke Award (2012); Commandeur de la Légion d'honneur or Commander of Legion of Honour (2018); Filmfare Lifetime Achievement Award - South (1994)

Signature
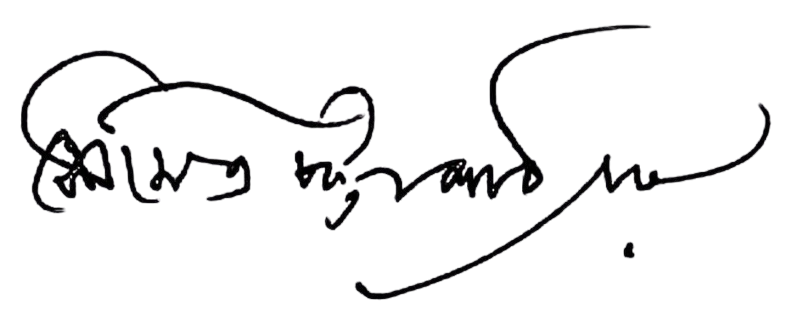

Soumitra Chatterjee (also spelt as Chattopadhyay; Bengali: [ˈʃou̯mitːɾo ˈt͡ʃɔʈːopadʱːae̯]; 19 January 1935 – 15 November 2020) was an Indian actor, director and writer who worked in Bengali cinema and theatre. He is regarded as one of the greatest and most influential actors in the history of Indian cinema. He is best known for his collaborations with director Satyajit Ray, with whom he worked in fourteen films.

Starting with his debut film, Apur Sansar (The World of Apu, 1959), the third part of The Apu Trilogy, as adult Apu, he went on to work in several films with Ray, including Abhijan (The Expedition, 1962), Charulata (1964), Kapurush (1965), Aranyer Din Ratri (Days and Nights in the Forest, 1969), Ashani Sanket (Distant Thunder, 1973), Sonar Kella (The Fortress of Gold, 1974) and Joi Baba Felunath (The Elephant God, 1978) as Feluda, Hirak Rajar Deshe (1980), Ghare Baire (The Home and The World, 1984), Shakha Proshakha (1990) and Ganashatru (Enemy of the People, 1989).

He also worked with other noted directors of Bengali cinema, such as Mrinal Sen in Akash Kusum (Up in the Clouds, 1965); Tapan Sinha in Kshudhita Pashan (Hungry Stones, 1960), Jhinder Bandi (Prisoner of Jhind, 1961); Asit Sen in Swaralipi (1961), Ajoy Kar in Parineeta (1969), and Tarun Mazumdar in Ganadevata (1978). He acted in more than 210 films in his career. He also received critical acclaim for his directorial debut Stree Ki Patra (1986) which was based on the Bengali short story Streer Patra by Rabindranath.

Soumitra was the recipient of multiple honours and awards. He was the first Indian film personality to be conferred with the Ordre des Arts et des Lettres (Commandeur), France's highest award for artists, in 1999. He was also awarded the Padma Bhushan (2004) and France's highest civilian award Commandeur de la Légion d' Honneur (Commander of Legion of Honour) (2017). He received three National Film Awards as an actor and the Sangeet Natak Akademi Award for his work in theatre. In 2012, he received the Dadasaheb Phalke Award, India's highest award in cinema given by the government of India for lifetime achievement. In 2013, IBN Live named him as one of "The men who changed the face of the Indian Cinema".

== Early life and background ==
Soumitra Chatterjee was born in Mirjapur Street (now Surya Sen Street) near Sealdah railway station, in Calcutta in 1935. The first ten years of his early life were spent in Krishnanagar in West Bengal where he studied in C.M.S. St. John's High School. The town under the influence of playwright Dwijendralal Ray, also from Krishnanagar, had a flourishing theatre culture, with numerous small theatre groups. His grandfather was the president of one such group while his father, though lawyer by profession and later a government worker, also worked as an amateur actor. Encouraged by the praise he received for his acting in school plays, gradually his interest in theatre grew with passing years. He was a very close friend of famous theatre personality, Mrityunjay Sil who is often regarded as a key influence on his career.

Soumitra and his family moved to Howrah where he studied at the Howrah Zilla School and Calcutta during his early years. Soumitra graduated from the City College, Kolkata with honours in Bengali literature, as a graduating student of the University of Calcutta. He lived for a few years in Calcutta in Satyajit Ray's old apartment at 3-lake temple road. He studied for his M.A. in Bengali from the University of Calcutta. While still a student, he learnt acting under noted actor-director of Bengali theatre Ahindra Choudhury. However a turning point came when in the final year of college he saw a play by Sisir Bhaduri, theatre director and the doyen of Bengali theatre. The play not only set a standard for acting for him, but also helped make up his mind to become an actor. He managed to meet Bhaduri, through his friend's mother, actress Shefalika Putul. Though, he met Bhaduri, towards the end of his career, when his theatre had closed, nevertheless over the next three years, till Bhaduri's death in 1959, Chatterjee made him a mentor, and learnt the craft of acting through their regular interactions. He even appeared in a small role in one of Bhaduri's productions.

Subsequently, he started his career working in All India Radio as an announcer, While he was there he started pursuing a career in films. He came in touch with Ray during the casting for Aparajito (1956), who was looking for new faces. Ray thought he had the right look, however found him, age 20, and just out of college, too old for the role of adolescent Apu. Ray remembered him and offered him the role of adult Apu two years later. Meanwhile, he was rejected in his screen test for Bengali film, Nilachale Mahaprabhu (1957) directed by Kartik Chattopadhyay.

== Career ==
=== Work with Satyajit Ray: 1959–1990 ===
Chatterjee had gone on the sets of Ray's fourth film, Jalsaghar (1958) to watch the shoot. He was unaware that he had already been selected for the title role in the Apu trilogy. That day, while he was leaving the sets, Ray called him over and introduced him to actor Chhabi Biswas as "This is Soumitra Chattopadhyay; he's playing Apu in my next film Apur Sansar" leaving him much surprised. Despite being selected, as a debutant actor, Chatterjee was nevertheless unsure of his career choice and especially his looks, as he didn't consider himself photogenic. However, on 9 August 1958, when the first shooting of the film was accepted in a single take, he realized that he had found his vocation. Thus Soumitra's film debut came in 1959 in Satyajit Ray's The World of Apu (Apur Sansar). In fact, Ray believed with a beard Chatterjee looked like young poet laureate Tagore.

Soumitra would go on to collaborate with Ray in fourteen films. His centrality to Ray's work is akin to other key collaborations in the history of cinema — Toshiro Mifune and Akira Kurosawa, Marcello Mastroianni and Federico Fellini, De Niro and Martin Scorsese, Leonardo DiCaprio and Martin Scorsese, Max von Sydow and Ingmar Bergman, Jerzy Stuhr and Krzysztof Kieślowski, Klaus Kinski and Werner Herzog. After Apur Sansar, he also worked with Sharmila Tagore in a number of Ray's films, apart from working with leading star actor of the period, Uttam Kumar, with whom he has often been compared, in eight films.

Chatterjee was cast in diverse roles by Ray and some of the stories and screenplays that Ray wrote were said to be written with him in mind. Soumitra featured as Feluda/Pradosh Chandra Mitter, the famous private investigator from Calcutta in Ray's Feluda series of books, in two films in the 1970s Sonar Kella (1974) and Joi Baba Felunath (1979). These two films were the first film series made for Feluda and are considered as the Feluda original film series. He was the first person who portrayed the iconic Bengali sleuth Feluda. Satyajit Ray made some illustrations of Feluda based on Soumitra's body figure and look in the 1970s Feluda books. After him, Sabyasachi Chakrabarty took the role of the iconic Bengali hero Feluda in the mid-1990s.

Soumitra had approached Satyajit Ray to suggest a name for a little magazine founded by Soumitra and Nirmalya Acharya in 1961. Satyajit Ray had named the magazine Ekkhon (Now), he designed the inaugural cover page and illustrated the cover pages regularly even after Soumitra had stopped editing the magazine. Nirmalya continued editing the magazine, and several of Ray's scripts were published in the magazine.

=== Other works ===
Besides working with Ray, Soumitra excelled in collaborations with other well-known Bengali directors such as Mrinal Sen and Tapan Sinha. He earned critical acclaim for his role of an impostor in Mrinal Sen's Akash Kusum (1965). He was equally confident in playing the swashbuckling horse-riding villain in Tapan Sinha's Jhinder Bandi (1961) giving the legendary Uttam Kumar a tough challenge. In the romantic film Teen Bhubaner Pare (1969), he shared the screen with actress Tanuja, the film was noted for his "flamboyant" style of acting. Besides films, Chatterjee continued acting in Kolkata-based Bengali theatre, and also published over 12 poetry books.

Entering the 1980s and 1990s, he started working with contemporary directors, like Goutam Ghose, Aparna Sen, Anjan Das and Rituparno Ghosh, and even acted on television. In 1986, he played the role of a swimming coach, Khitish Singh(Khidda) in film Kony (1986) directed by Saroj Dey, who was part of the film collective Agragami. The film is about a young girl from a slum, who wants to become a swimmer. At the 32nd National Film Awards, the film won the National Film Award for Best Popular Film Providing Wholesome Entertainment. Later in a 2012 interview, he called Kony one of the best films of his career. He even recalled using film's catch-phrase "Fight-Koni-fight" in hard times, as a chant to himself to lift his "aging spirits". The phrase had become popular with middle-class Bengalis at the time. He also starred in his biopic Abhijaan directed by Parambrata Chatterjee, an artist himself. The movie was released in April 2022 posthumously as a tribute to Soumitra featuring Jisshu Sengupta who portrayed the younger self of the late artist.

=== Theatre ===
He replaced Mrityunjay Sil as the lead artist in 1958. Mrityunjay Sil was at the peak of his theatre career at that time. But due to personal issues he suggested his friend, Soumitra's name. Mrityunjay Sil is often credited with being one of the few people to have helped Soumitra. But, he soon left his job.

After a two-decade long busy career as a leading man of Bengali cinema, he returned to theatre in 1978, with his production Naam Jiban, staged at Biswarupa Theatre in Kolkata. This led to other plays like Rajkumar (1982), Phera (1987), Nilkantha (1988), Ghatak Biday (1990) and Nyaymurti (1996), beside notable plays like Tiktiki (1995), an adaptation of Sleuth and Homapakhi (2006). Besides acting, he has written and directed several plays, translated a few and also branched out to poetry reading in recent decades.

Since 14 November 2010, he regularly performed in the title role of the play Raja Lear directed by Suman Mukhopadhyay and produced by Minerva Repertory Theatre, a play based on King Lear by William Shakespeare. Soumitra received widespread critical and popular accolades for his acting in the play.

== Awards and recognition ==
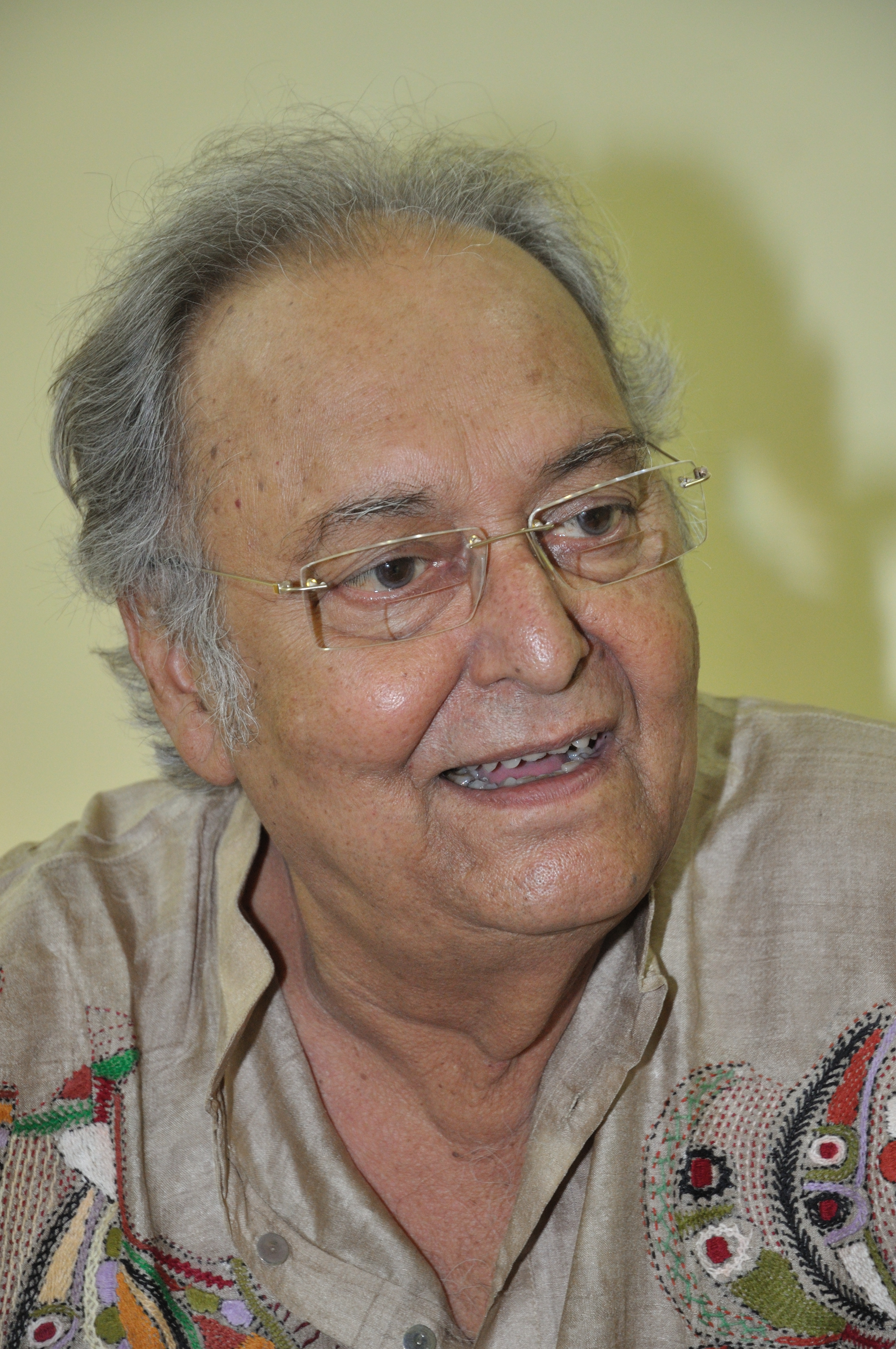
Chatterjee in 2011.

Chatterjee received the 'Commandeur' Officier des Arts et Metiers, the highest award for arts given by the French government in 1999, and the Lifetime Award at the Naples Film Festival, Italy. He turned down the Padma Shri award from the Indian government in the 1970s. In 2004, he accepted the prestigious Padma Bhushan award from the President of India. He has been the subject of a full-length documentary named Gaach by French film director Catherine Berge. In 1998, he was awarded the Sangeet Natak Akademi Award given by the Sangeet Natak Akademi, India's National Academy of Music, Dance & Drama.

Incidentally, besides receiving eight awards from the Bengal Film Journalists' Association for the best actor and international recognition for his acting prowess, Chatterjee never won a National Film Award for acting in the early part of his career, which established his reputation as an actor, working with directors like Satyajit Ray, Tapan Sinha and Mrinal Sen. Thus, over the years, he has been vocal about his feelings of disappointment and alleging bias in the National Film Awards committee towards awarding popular and mainstream cinema. Thus, in a gesture of protest against, he turned down the 2001 Special Jury Award for Dekha directed by Goutam Ghose. Later in an interview he stated "the National Film Awards, overlooked my performances in several powerful roles. When I did Kony, Shashi Kapoor was adjudged the best actor. Anil Kapoor was feted (Best Actor) for Pukar while Dekha was awarded a 'consolation' prize".

However, after receiving the Padma Bhushan, the third highest civilian honour given by Government of India in 2004, he changed his viewpoint towards awards, and stated "Now (after Padma Bhushan) I feel I don't have the right to hurt my viewers by rejecting an award." A few years later, on 9 June 2008, he was awarded the 2007 National Film Award for Best Actor for Podokkhep (Footsteps) (2006), which he accepted though stating "after decades of acting, I do not attach too much value to it".
In 2010, he won Best Supporting Actor at 54th Asia-Pacific Film Festival for his role in Angshumaner Chhobi (2009).

In 2012, he was awarded the Dadasaheb Phalke Award, India's highest award in cinema given annually by the Government of India for lifetime contribution to Indian cinema. In 2014, he received the introductory Filmfare Awards East for Best Male Actor (Critics) for his role in Rupkatha Noy and also he won Filmfare Lifetime Achievement Award – South (1994).

Civilian awards

- 1998 Sangeet Natak Akademi Award by Sangeet Natak Akademi
- 1999: Commandeur de l' Ordre des Arts et des Lettres by the Government of France
- 2000: Hony. D.Litt. from Rabindra Bharati University,Kolkata
- 2004: Padma Bhushan by the Government of India
- 2012: Sangeet Natak Akademi Tagore Ratna by Sangeet Natak Akademi
- 2016: Kazi Sabyasachi Memorial Award by the Government of Bangladesh
- 2017: Commandeur of Legion d'Honneur by the Government of France

National Film Awards

- 1991: National Film Award – Special Jury Award for Antardhan
- 2000: National Film Award – Special Jury Award for Dekha
- 2006: National Film Award – Best Actor for Podokkhep
- 2012: Dadasaheb Phalke Award

Bengal Film Journalists' Association Awards

- B.F.J.A. Best Actor Award for Teen Kanya (1961)
- B.F.J.A. Best Actor Award for Abhijan (1963)
- B.F.J.A. Best Actor Award for Baghini (1969)
- B.F.J.A. Best Actor Award for Ashani Sanket (1974)
- B.F.J.A. Best Actor Award for Sansar Simanthey (1976)
- B.F.J.A. Best Actor Award for Kony (1987)
- B.F.J.A. Best Actor Award for Agnisanket (1989)
- B.F.J.A. Best Actor Award for Krantikaal (2006)

Filmfare Awards East

- Filmfare Awards East – Best Male Actor (Critics) for Rupkatha Noy (2013)
- Best Male Actor (Critics) for Mayurakshi (2017)
- Best Actor (Male) for Sansar Simante (1975)
- Best Actor (Male) for Babu Moshai (1977)
- Best Actor (Male) for Ganadevata (1979)
- Best Actor (Male) for Agradani (1983)

Filmfare Awards South

- Filmfare Lifetime Achievement Award – South (1994)

== Works ==
Chatterjee has multiple works to his credit in Bengali, including:

Books

- Charitrer Sandhane ("Search of Character"; 2004). Kolkata: Saptarshi Prakashan.
- Pratidin Taba Gatha ("You Sing Everyday"; 2009). Kolkata: Aajkaal Publishers Pvt Ltd. About Rabindranath Tagore in many aspects of his life.
- Agrapathikera ("Pioneers"; 2010). Kolkata: Aajkaal Publishers Pvt Ltd. A memoir of his seniors and friends who are no more.
- Porichoy: ("Introduction"; 2013). Prakash Bhaban.
- Manikdar Sange ("With Manik Da"; 2014). Kolkata: Aajkaal Publishers Pvt Ltd. Translated as "The Master and I: Soumitra on Satyajit" by Arunava Sinha. Depicts the journey with his master Satyajit Ray (1959–1992).

Poetry collections

- Śreshṭha Kabitā ("Best Poem", poetry collection; 1993). Calcutta: Dey's Publication. ISBN 978-81-295-2654-0
- Madhyarater Sangket: ("Midnight Signal"; 2012). Kolkata: Signet Press. ISBN 978-93-504-0169-9.
- Kabita Samagra: ("Poetry Collection"; 2014). Kolkata: Ananda Publishers Pvt Ltd. ISBN 978-93-504-0411-9.
- Shabdora Aamar Bagane ("Words in My Garden")

Dramas

- Natak Samagra 1: ("Drama Collection 1"; 2015). Kolkata: Ananda Publishers Pvt Ltd. ISBN 978-93-504-0527-7.
- Natak Samagra 2: ("Drama Collection 2"; 2017). Kolkata: Ananda Publishers Pvt Ltd. ISBN 978-93-504-0818-6.
- Natak Samagra 3: ("Drama Collection 3"). Kolkata: Ananda Publishers Pvt Ltd. ISBN 978-93-504-0959-6.

In translation

The Master and I: Soumitra on Satyajit, Soumitra Chatterjee, tr. by Arunava Sinha. Supernova Publishers, 2014. ISBN 9788189930721. Translation of Chatterjee's Manikdar Sange.

- Our Nataraj: Sisir Bhaduri – Theatre to Talkies, Soumitra Chattopadhyay. Comp., ed. and tr. by Mou Chakraborty. Sister Nivedita University Press, 2026. ISBN 978-81-997456-9-8. Foreword by Soumitra Basu; contributions by Mita Chatterjee and Poulomi Chatterjee. A work of theatre history, film history, memoir and cultural history. Released at the Kolkata International Book Fair 2026.

Works about

- Soumitra Chatterjee: A Life in Cinema, Theatre, Poetry & Painting. Arjun Sengupta & Partha Mukherjee. Niyogi Books, 2021. ISBN 9389136768
- Beyond Apu - 20 Favourite film roles of Soumitra Chatterjee. Amitava Nag. HarperCollins India, 2016. ISBN 9350298619.
- Soumitra edited by Alok Chattopadhyay and Manas Chakraborty. ISBN 938539357X.
- Gaach (1998), a documentary film by Catherine Berge; produced by Merchant Ivory Productions.
- Palu: A film on Soumitra Chatterjee (2018), a Bengali documentary film by Partha Mukherjee and Arunendra Mookherjee; produced by Eastern Zonal Cultural Centre, Kolkata.

== Illness and death ==
On 5 October 2020, Chatterjee tested positive for COVID-19 and was admitted on 6 October in Belle Vue Clinic, Kolkata. However, he tested negative to the second COVID-19 test conducted on 14 October. In the meantime, his complications (urinary tract infection, fluctuations in sodium potassium levels, etc.) made the condition critical and he had to be admitted to ICU. From 13 October, his condition started to improve marginally and on 14 October, he was transferred from a Covid unit to a non-Covid unit. He was kept on BiPAP support and invasive ventilation for in the critical times; after his improvement in health, the treatment mechanisms were changed. He was under the supervision of a medical team of 16 physicians. On 25 October, his condition further deteriorated. On 15 November 2020, Chatterjee died due to COVID-19 induced encephalopathy at Bellevue hospital in Kolkata at 12.15 p.m.

== See also ==
- Parallel cinema
- Sisir Bhaduri
- Bengali theatre
- Theatre of India

== Bibliography ==
- Robinson, Andrew (1989). Satyajit Ray: The Inner Eye. University of California Press. p. 362. ISBN 978-0-520-06946-6.
- Ray, Satyajit (1996). My Years with Apu. Penguin Books India. ISBN 978-0-14-024780-0.
- Ray, Satyajit (2007). Satyajit Ray: Interviews. Univ. Press of Mississippi. ISBN 978-1-57806-937-8.
- Chattopadhyay, Soumitra (2026). Our Nataraj: Sisir Bhaduri – Theatre to Talkies. Comp., ed. and tr. by Mou Chakraborty. Sister Nivedita University Press. ISBN 978-81-997456-9-8.
