= Bansi Chandragupta =

Art director

- Born: 6 February 1924; Sialkot, Punjab, British India
- Died: 27 June 1981 (aged 57); Brookhaven, New York, US
- Education: University of Calcutta
- Occupations: Art Director, Production Designer

Bansi Chandragupta (6 February, 1924–27 June, 1981) was an Indian art director and production designer, regarded among the greatest of art directors of Indian film industry. He won Filmfare Best Art Direction Award thrice, for Seema in 1972, for Do Jhoot in 1976 and for Chakra in 1982. He was awarded Evening Standard British Film Award posthumously for "best technical/artistic achievement" in 1983. He was born in 1924 in Sialkot, Punjab, British India and died on 27 June 1981 in Brookhaven, New York, United States.

Chandragupta is most well known as art director/production designer of movies directed by Satyajit Ray. He also worked with renowned film directors like Jean Renoir, Mrinal Sen, Shyam Benegal, Basu Chatterjee, Ismail Merchant, James Ivory, Tarun Majumdar and Aparna Sen.

== Early life ==
Bansi Chandragupta was born at Sialkot in Pakistan. Chandragupta's family moved from Pakistan to Kashmir when he was a young boy. Here he met painter Shubho Tagore, on whose advice Chandragupta moved to Calcutta to pursue his ambition in painting. He spent most of his working life in this city.

== Career ==
After a few stints in Bengali commercial films, Chandragupta got a chance to work as art director in Jean Renoir's movie The River (1951). Here he worked closely with production designer Eugène Lourié and learned the craft of film designing. During the shooting of this movie, he met Satyajit Ray who asked him to join a group of film enthusiasts that included Ray, RP Gupta, Sunil Janah, Chidananda Dasgupta, Harisadhan Dasgupta and others, to form the Calcutta Film Society.

Later, Ray asked Chandragupta to be set designer for his film Pather Panchali. This collaboration sustained till Shatranj Ke Khilari (1977). Some of the best examples of Chandragupta's work are from the Ray films: Pather Panchali, Jalsaghar and Charulata.

Apart from Ray's films, best works of Chandragupta's works are visible in 36 Chowringhee Lane by Aparna Sen, Umrao Jaan by Muzzafar Ali and Chakra by Rabindra Dharamraj. All these were shot in 1981, the year Chandragupta died of a heart attack in New York.

36 Chowringhee Lane was dedicated to Chandragupta.

== Filmography ==
=== Production Designer ===
- Akaler Sandhane (1980) directed by Mrinal Sen
- Manzil (1979) directed by Basu Chatterjee
- Mahatma and the Mad Boy (1974) directed by Ismail Merchant
- 27 Down (1974)
- Pratidwandi (1972) directed by Satyajit Ray
- Seemabaddha (1971) directed by Satyajit Ray
- Aranyer Din Ratri (1970) directed by Satyajit Ray
- The Guru (1969) directed by James Ivory
- Goopy Gyne Bagha Byne (1968) directed by Satyajit Ray
- Chiriyakhana (1967) directed by Satyajit Ray
- Nayak (1966) directed by Satyajit Ray
- Akash Kusum (1965) directed by Mrinal Sen
- Kapurush (1965) directed by Satyajit Ray
- Mahapurush (1965) directed by Satyajit Ray
- Charulata (1964) directed by Satyajit Ray
- Mahanagar (1963) directed by Satyajit Ray
- Abhijan (1962) directed by Satyajit Ray
- Kanchenjungha (1962) directed by Satyajit Ray
- Rabindranath Tagore (1961) directed by Satyajit Ray
- Teen Kanya (1961) directed by Satyajit Ray
- Baishey Shravana (1960) directed by Mrinal Sen
- Devi (1960) directed by Satyajit Ray
- Apur Sansar (1959) directed by Satyajit Ray
- Jalsaghar (1958) directed by Satyajit Ray
- Maya Bazaar (1958)
- Parash Pathar (1958) directed by Satyajit Ray
- Aparajito (1956) directed by Satyajit Ray
- Pather Panchali (1955) directed by Satyajit Ray

=== Art Director ===
- Tarang (1984) directed by Kumar Sahani
- 36 Chowringhee Lane (1981) directed by Aparna Sen
- Chakra (1981) directed by Rabindra Dharmaraj
- Kalyug (1981) directed by Shyam Benegal
- Umrao Jaan (1981) directed by Muzaffar Ali
- Tumhari Kassam (1978)
- Mukti (1977)
- Shatranj Ke Khilari (1977)
- Trimurti (1974)
- Aaj Ki Taaza Khabar (1973)
- Jangal Mein Mangal (1972)
- Piya Ka Ghar (1972) directed by Basu Chatterjee
- Paraya Dhan (1971)
- Balika Badhu (1967)
- Chiriyakhana (1967) directed by Satyajit Ray
- Pather Panchali (1955) directed by Satyajit Ray
- The River (1951) directed by Jean Renoir

=== Set Decorator ===
- Balika Badhu (1967)
- Chiriyakhana (1967)

=== Miscellaneous Crew ===
Hullabaloo Over Georgie and Bonnie's Pictures (1978)
