= Soumendu Roy =

Indian cinematographer (1933–2023)

- Born: 7 February 1933
- Died: 27 September 2023 (aged 90); Kolkata, West Bengal, India
- Other name: Soumendu Ray
- Occupation: Cinematographer
- Years active: 1960–2000

Soumendu Roy (7 February 1932 – 27 September 2023) was an Indian cinematographer most known for his work with noted director Satyajit Ray's films, starting with Teen Kanya (1961), when Subrata Mitra developed an eye-problem, though he has earlier shot Ray's documentary Rabindranath Tagore (1961) and has been an assistant to Subrata in post Pather Panchali films.

== Career ==
Roy watched his first film—Chaplin's Gold Rush—in the early 1940s in Kolkata. Around 1947–48, he became acquainted with photography darkroom lessons at a studio owned by his schoolmate's elder brother in Kolkata. In the mid-1950s, he began assisting cinematographers Ramananda Sengupta, Dinen Gupta, Jagmohan Mehrotra, and GK Mehta in the lighting function. During this time, he was associated with Kolkata's Technicians' Studio. He also served as a trolley puller before beginning to compose shots. The first time he worked as a cameraman was for an Oriya movie as Ramananda Sengupta's assistant.

Starting as a handler of trolley and lighting in early Ray films, Roy went on to work on 22 of Ray's films including 18 features, Golden Bear winning film, Ashani Sanket (1973) and Aranyer Din Ratri (1969). He also worked with directors, Tapan Sinha, Tarun Majumdar, Buddhadeb Dasgupta and MS Sathyu.

In his long career, Roy won the National Film Award for Best Cinematography three times, plus one Best Non-Feature Film Cinematography award for documentary film, Suchitra Mitra in 1993, directed by Raja Sen.After his retirement in 2000, he continued to teach film students at various institutions.

In 2006, a 30-minute documentary on him, "Portrait of a Cinematographer", was screened at the International Film Festival of India (IFFI) in Goa, directed by Papia Roy, and subsequently, Soumendu Ray, a 70 min. documentary by Arindam Saha Sardar. Roy was advisor of cinematography department of Roopkala Kendro an indo Italian film institute under the information and cultural ministry of Government of West Bengal.

== Death ==
Soumendu Roy died on 27 September 2023, at the age of 90.

== Filmography ==
- Rabindranath Tagore (1961)
- Teen Kanya (1961)
- Abhijaan (1962)
- Palatak (1963)
- Two (Short Film) (1964)
- Alor Pipasha (1965)
- Abhoya O Srikanta (1965)
- Baksabadal (1965)
- Mahapurush (1965)
- Kapurush (1965)
- Ektuku Basa (1965)
- Chiriyakhana (1967)
- Balika Badhu (1967 film)
- Badhubaran (1967 film)
- Goopy Gyne Bagha Byne (1969)
- Aranyer Din Ratri (1970)
- Pratidwandi (1970)
- Kuheli (1971)
- Sikkim (1971)
- Seemabaddha (1971)
- The Inner Eye (1972)
- Ashani Sanket (1973)
- Sadhu Judhishthirer Karcha (1974)
- Sonar Kella (1974)
- Jana Aranya (1976)
- Nidhiram Sardar (1976)
- Shatranj Ke Khilari (1977)
- Joybaba Felunath (1979)
- Heerak Rajar Deshe (1980)
- Bala (Short Film)
- Sadgati (1981) (Tele Film)
- Kann Sivanthaal Mann Sivakkum (1982)
- Phatik Chand (1983)
- Piku (Short Film) (1983)
- Islam In India (Documentary)
- Ghare Baire (1985)
- Sundarban (Documentary) (1985)
- Bhombal Sardar (Short Film) (1988)
- Agun (1988)
- Debata (1990)
- Wiil To Live (English)
- Anokha Moti
- Ek Doctor Ki Maut (1991)
- Antardhyan (1992)
- Potli Baba Ki (1991) (TV series)
- Charachar (1993)
- Wheelchair (1994)
- Satabdirkanya
- Ajab Gayer Ajab Katha (1998)

== Awards ==
- National Film Award
  - 1974: Best Cinematography: Ashani Sanket
  - 1975: Best Cinematography: Sonar Kella
  - 1978: Best Cinematography: Shatranj Ke Khiladi
  - 1993: Best Non-Feature Film Cinematography : Sucitra Mitra
- Tamil Nadu State Film Awards
  - 1982: Best Cinematographer: Kann Sivanthaal Mann Sivakkum
- 2015: Special Film Award, Government of West Bengal
- 2020: Satyajit Ray Lifetime Achievement Award
