= Dulal Dutta =

Indian film editor

Dulal Dutta (c. 1925 (Note: Sources disagree on Datta's date of birth and age at the time of his death which is claimed to be either 84 (IMDb), 85 (Indian Express), 86 (Telegraph) or 87 (Deccan Herald). The Indian Express further claims that Dutta was born in Chandannagar.) – 17 August 2010; Kolkata) was a film editor in the Bengali film industry located in Kolkata (previously Calcutta), West Bengal, India. He is especially remembered for his association with the acclaimed film director Satyajit Ray, whose films were all edited by Dutta.

== Early life ==
In the early 1940s, Dulal Dutta moved to Kolkata from Chandannagar, a small town and former French colony about 30–40 km away. He watched his first movie at Suchitra Theater in Behala, southwestern Kolkata, while working as a compounder at a charitable dispensary in Alipur, not very far away. In 1942, he ran off to Mumbai and for a while worked as a make-up artist and clapper-boy in films before being allowed inside the editing lab at a production company in Mumbai.

== Career ==
He worked as an assistant editor and observing editor at Ranjit Movietone in Mumbai before returning to Kolkata before 1949. In Kolkata, he got acquainted with Ramesh Joshi, editor of Ritwik Ghatak's films, including his most famous works, through another film editor and director, Ardhendu Chatterjee. Joshi introduced Dutta to Bharat Lakshmi Studios, established in 1933/1934 and well known for producing films in multiple languages. Although Dutta never received any formal training in film editing, while working at the studio, he learned film editing from the ground up.

With films like Paribartan (1949) and Borjatri (1951), he became an independent editor. While working on the latter, he got acquainted with art director Bansi Chandragupta, who, in turn, introduced him to Satyajit Ray in 1951

Dutta edited all of Ray's films, from Pather Panchali (1955) to Agantuk (1991), apart from shorts and documentaries, in a collaboration that lasted 36 years. Merchant-Ivory Productions approached him to edit one of their productions, which would have brought him good money, but he turned down the “prized contract” since it would have taken him away from Ray's projects.

After Ray's death, Dutta edited Uttoran and Target, directed by Sandip Ray, his erstwhile mentor's son.

== Death ==
Dulal Dutta died in Kolkata on August 17, 2010, after a cerebral haemorrhage.

== Filmography ==
- Debatra (1955)
- Pather Panchali (1955)
- Aparajito (1956)
- Asha (1956)
- Andhare Alo (1957)
- Parash Pathar (1958)
- Jalsaghar (1958)
- Apur Sansar (1959)
- Devi (1960)
- Teen Kanya (1961)
- Rabindranath Tagore (1961)
- Kanchenjungha (1962)
- Abhijan (1962)
- Mahanagar (1963)
- Charulata (1964)
- Mahapurush (1965)
- Kapurush (1965)
- Nayak (1966)
- Chiriyakhana (1967)
- Balika Badhu (1967)
- Goopy Gyne Bagha Byne (1968)
- Charan Kavi Mukundadas (1968)
- Aranyer Din Ratri (1970)
- Sikkim (1971)
- Seemabaddha (1971)
- The Inner Eye (1972)
- Pratidwandi (1972)
- Ashani Sanket (1973)
- Sonar Kella (1974)
- Jana Aranya (1976)
- Shatranj Ke Khilari (1977)
- Heerak Rajar Deshe (1980)
- Sadgati (1981) (TV)
- Pikoo (1981) (TV)
- Phatik Chand (1983)
- Ghare Baire (1984)
- Ganashatru (1989)
- Shakha Proshakha (1990)
- Goopy Bagha Phire Elo (1991)
- Agantuk (1991)
- Uttoran (1994)
- Target (1995)

=== Sound Department ===
- Chiriyakhana (1967) (sound editor)
- Balika Badhu (1967) (English title: The Young Wife) (sound editor)
