= The Chess Players (film) =

1977 film by Satyajit Ray

Shatranj Ke Khilari
- Directed by: Satyajit Ray
- Written by: Satyajit Ray; Shama Zaidi; Javed Siddiqui
- Screenplay by: Satyajit Ray
- Based on: Shatranj ke Khiladi by Munshi Premchand
- Produced by: Suresh Jindal
- Starring: Sanjeev Kumar; Saeed Jaffrey; Shabana Azmi; Richard Attenborough; Farida Jalal; Amjad Khan; David Abraham; Victor Banerjee; Farooque Shaikh; Tom Alter; Leela Mishra; Samarth Narain; Bhudo Advani
- Narrated by: Amitabh Bachchan
- Cinematography: Soumendu Roy
- Edited by: Dulal Dutta
- Music by: Satyajit Ray
- Release date: 11 March 1977
- Running time: 129 minutes
- Country: India
- Languages: Hindi; Urdu; English
- Budget: est. ₹ 20 lakh (est. ₹ 5.66 crore as of 2022)

Shatranj Ke Khilari, also subtitled and later internationally released with the translated title The Chess Players, is a 1977 Indian film written and directed by Satyajit Ray, based on Munshi Premchand's short story of the same name.

Amjad Khan plays the role of Nawab Wajid Ali Shah, Nawab of Awadh, and Richard Attenborough enacts the role of General James Outram. The main cast includes actors Sanjeev Kumar and Saeed Jaffrey as the chess players. It also has Shabana Azmi, Farooque Shaikh, Farida Jalal, David Abraham, and Tom Alter. It has Amitabh Bachchan as the narrator.

It was India's entry for the Best Foreign Language Film at the 51st Academy Awards, but did not receive a nomination.

This is the only full-length Hindi feature film of filmmaker Satyajit Ray. He later made a short Hindi film for TV named Sadgati, another adaptation of Munshi Premchand's short story.

== Plot ==
=== Historical background ===
The film is set in 1856 on the eve of the Indian Rebellion of 1857. The British are about to annexe the Oudh State (also spelled Awadh). The daily life of two wealthy men who are devoted to chess is presented against the background of scheming officials of the British East India Company, the history of its relations with the Indian ruler of Awadh, and the ruler's devotion both to his religious practice and the pursuit of pleasure.

=== Summary ===
The film shows in parallel the historical drama of the Indian princely state of Awadh (whose capital is Lucknow) and its Nawab, Wajid Ali Shah who is overthrown by the British, alongside the story of two noblemen who are obsessed with shatranj, i.e. chess.

Wajid Ali Shah, the ruling Nawab of Awadh, is a languid artist and poet, no longer in command of events and unable to effectively oppose the British demand for his throne. Parallel to this wider drama is the personal (and humorous) tale of two rich, indolent noblemen of this kingdom, Mirza Sajjad Ali and Mir Roshan Ali. Inseparable friends, the two nobles are passionately obsessed with the game of shatranj (chess). Both effectively neglect their wives and fail to fight the takeover of their kingdom by the East India Company. Instead, they escape their harangued wives and responsibilities, fleeing from Lucknow to play chess in a tiny village untouched by greater events. Ray's basic theme in the film is the message that the self-centredness, detachment and cowardice of India's ruling classes catalysed the annexation of Awadh by a handful of British officials, among whom Captain Weston, a British soldier in love with Urdu poetry, is also worth noting.

In the last scene, after which Mir shoots at Mirza and complains out loud "(If you die) I won't have a partner to play chess with", Mirza responds to him "but you have one in front of you!" (thus making him understand that he forgives him). He finally concludes that "after nightfall, we will go back home. We both need darkness to hide our faces."

== Cast ==
- Sanjeev Kumar as Mirza Sajjad Ali
- Saeed Jaffrey as Mir Roshan Ali
- Shabana Azmi as Khurshid, Mirza's wife
- Richard Attenborough as General James Outram
- Farida Jalal as Nafisa, Mir's wife
- Amjad Khan as Wajid Ali Shah
- David Abraham as Munshi Nandlal
- Victor Banerjee as Prime Minister ("Madar-ud-Daula")
- Veena as Malika Kishwar, Queen Mother of Wajid Ali Shah
- Farooq Sheikh as Aqueel
- Tom Alter as Captain Weston, Outram's aide de camp
- Leela Mishra as Hirya, Khurshid's maid
- Saswati Sen as Kathak dancer in the song 'Kanha main tose haari'
- Samarth Narain as Kallu
- Bhudo Advani as Abbajani
- Agha as Chuttan Miyan – Abbajani's attendant – (Uncredited)
- Barry John
- Kamu Mukherjee
- Amitabh Bachchan as Narrator

== Production ==
The Chess Players employed stars of the Bombay cinema (Sanjeev Kumar, Amjad Khan, Shabana Azmi and Amitabh Bachchan as a narrator) together with British actors (such as Sir Richard Attenborough).

The production of the film included studio shootings at Indrapuri Studio in Kolkata, where the sets were designed by art director Bansi Chandragupta. Indrapuri Studio was indeed used to recreate Lucknow for the film. There were location shoots near Lucknow, including in a village close to the city, for outdoor scenes.

== Reception ==
The film was well received upon its release. Despite the film's limited budget, The Washington Post critic Gary Arnold gave it a positive review; "He [Ray] possesses what many overindulged Hollywood filmmakers often lack: a view of history". According to Martin Scorsese, "This film deals with a moment of incredible change in Indian history and is told from a comical view that is a hallmark of Ray’s work. Watching it again, I realize this is what it must really feel like to live through a moment of historic change. It feels this big and tragic at the same time."

== Awards and nominations ==
Year	Award	Category	Nominee(s)	Result
1978	Berlin International Film Festival	Golden Bear	Satyajit Ray	Nominated
1978	National Film Awards	Best Feature Film in Hindi	Satyajit Ray	Won
1978	National Film Awards	Best Cinematography (Color)	Soumendu Roy	Won
1978	Filmfare Awards	Best Film (Critics)	Satyajit Ray	Won
1979	Filmfare Awards	Best Film	Suresh Jindal	Nominated
1979	Filmfare Awards	Best Director	Satyajit Ray	Won
1979	Filmfare Awards	Best Supporting Actor	Saeed Jaffrey	Won

== Preservation ==
The Chess Players was preserved by the Academy Film Archive in 2010.

== See also ==
- List of Asian historical drama films
- List of submissions to the 51st Academy Awards for Best Foreign Language Film
- List of Indian submissions for the Academy Award for Best International Feature Film
