= Two (1964 film) =

1964 short film by Satyajit Ray

- Title card of the film
- Directed by: Satyajit Ray
- Screenplay by: Satyajit Ray
- Produced by: Esso World Theater
- Starring: Ravi Kiran /Babu Biswas
- Cinematography: Soumendu Roy
- Edited by: Dulal Dutta
- Music by: Satyajit Ray
- Distributed by: Esso World Theater (in public domain)
- Release date: 1964
- Running time: 12 minutes
- Country: India
- Language: No dialogue

Two: A Film Fable is a 1964 Indian black-and-white short film directed by Satyajit Ray. The film was part of a trilogy of short films from India made under the banner of Esso World Theater at the request of American television broadcaster PBS. Ray, who worked prominently for Bengali cinema, was requested to make a film in English language with a Bengali setting. However, Ray, being an admirer of silent film, decided to make a film without any dialogue as a tribute to the genre.

The short film displays a rivalry between the child of a rich family and a street child over their toys. The film is among less known films of Ray but experts rated the film as one of Ray's best. It is often regarded as a prelude to another Ray film, Goopy Gyne Bagha Byne (1969). Made during the Vietnam War, experts believe that the film makes "a strong anti-war statement" as it ends with the sound of the street child's flute overpowering those of the expensive toys.

The Academy Film Archive, part of the Academy Foundation, endeavored to restore Satyajit Ray's films and could successfully restore 19 Ray films. Two was preserved in 2006. The film's original script was included in a book named Original English Film Scripts Satyajit Ray, put together by Ray's son Sandip Ray.

== Plot ==
The film begins with a rich kid (Ravi Kiran) shown to be playing with his toys and enjoying the bottled soft drink possibly symbolising the imperialist capitalist First World. While playing, he overhears a sound and curiously overlooks the window to see a slum kid playing a flute, possibly symbolising the exploited Third World. In order to show off his toys, the rich kid takes out his toy trumpet to make loud sounds. The street kid then goes back to his hut and returns playing a small drum to which rich kid shows his battery-powered monkey drummer toy. When the street kid comes out home-made mask and bow and arrow, rich kid wears various masks including one of a demon, native American and Cowboy brandishing swords, spears, and guns. Disappointed, the street kid returns to his hut and the rich kid also goes back to play with his toys with a sense of sadistic satisfaction.

While playing, the rich kid notices a kite flying in the sky, through the window. Curious to know who is flying the kite, the rich kid runs to the window to see the slum kid holding the kite string, Manja. Furious on seeing the street kid happily flying the kite, the rich kid gets his slingshot to attack the kite. Unable to aim properly, he then gets his toy air-rifle and successfully shoots down the kite and taunts the poor street kid with a sense of cruel satisfaction. The Street kid then returns to his hut with tears in his innocent eyes and a torn kite and gives up on trying to be friends with the rich kid.

The rich kid then comes back to his toys and starts playing all of them, with each making its own sound. The film ends when rich kid could still hear the flute sound through the window despite the loud noises of his toys and ponders over his deeds as the toy robot he had left playing hits the toy tower and makes it fall to the ground.

Since it was made during Vietnam War, it is very probable that the rich bossy kid and the poor street kid are personifications of the United States of America and Vietnam respectively.

== Credits ==
=== Cast ===
- Ravi Kiran Karla as Rich Kid
- Babu Biswas as Street Kid

=== Crew ===
- Editor: Dulal Dutta
- Art direction: Bansi Chandragupta
- Sound designer: Sujit Sarkar
- Cinematographer: Soumendu Roy
- Music direction: Satyajit Ray

== Restoration ==
After Academy of Motion Picture Arts and Sciences awarded Satyajit Ray an honorary Academy Award in 1992 for Lifetime Achievement, Academy Film Archive, part of the Academy Foundation, which mainly works with objectives as "preservation, restoration, documentation, exhibition and study of motion pictures" took an initiative to restore and preserve Ray's films. Josef Lindner was appointed as a preservation officer and Academy could successfully restore 19 Ray titles so far. The academy has restored the movie 'Two' in 2016 and has uploaded the movie in their YouTube Channel.

== In media ==
Satyajit Ray mentioned about Two and its timing in his biography Portrait of a Director: Satyajit Ray by Marie Seton that he considered that the film "packs quite a punch in its ten [sic] minutes". The film had its first public screening at Academy of Fine Arts, Kolkata. On 19 January 2008, a week-long exhibition "Art of Ray: A Ray Society Exhibition" was inaugurated by then Governor of West Bengal, Gopalkrishna Gandhi and showcased Two. At "Ray Festival 2009", Satyajit Ray Society screened Two along with other three Ray documentaries, namely Rabindranath Tagore, The Inner Eye and Sukumar Ray on 7 May 2009. The film's original script was included in a book named Original English Film Scripts Satyajit Ray, put together by Ray's son Sandip Ray along with an ex-CEO of Ray Society, Aditinath Sarkar, which also included original scripts of Ray's other films.
