= Sirsho Banerjee =

Indian journalist and writer (1967–2021)

Shirsho Bandopadhyay
- শীর্ষ বন্দোপাধ্যায়
- Born: 1967
- Died: 17 May 2021 (aged 54); Gariahat, Kolkata, India
- Occupations: Writer, Journalist
- Notable work: Shardul Sundari, Sandya Rater Shefali

Sirsho Banerjee or Sirsho Bandopadhyay (1967–2021) was an Indian journalist and writer of Bengali origin. He worked for many years at Deutsche Welle, in both Cologne and Calcutta. He also worked at various West Bengal media outlets, such as Aajkal, Star Ananda, etc.

As a writer, he was best known for his novel Shardul Shundori, translated by Arunava Sinha with the title Tiger Woman. He also wrote Ether Sena about the 1971 Bangladesh Independence War and ghost-wrote Shondha Raater Shefali about the famous Calcutta cabaret dancer Arati Das.

He died suddenly at his Goriahat home in May 2021.

== Works ==
- সন্ধ্যারাতের শেফালি
- শার্দুলসুন্দরী
- তেরো নদীর পারে
- এক নম্বর পাঁচু মিস্ত্রি লেন
- রমণীরতন
- ব্লগবকম
- ইথারসেনা
- মাউন্ট রাধানাথ
- প্রিন্স গোবর গোহো
- গণপতি দ্য গ্রেট
