= The Inner Eye =

1972 documentary by Satyajit Ray

- Title card of the film
- Directed by: Satyajit Ray
- Written by: Satyajit Ray
- Screenplay by: Satyajit Ray
- Based on: Life and works of Benode Behari Mukherjee
- Produced by: Films Division of India
- Starring: Benode Behari Mukherjee
- Narrated by: Satyajit Ray
- Cinematography: Soumendu Roy
- Edited by: Dulal Dutta
- Music by: Satyajit Ray
- Distributed by: Films Division of India
- Release date: 1972
- Running time: 20 minutes
- Country: India
- Language: English

The Inner Eye is a 1972 short documentary film made by Satyajit Ray on Benode Behari Mukherjee, a blind artist and a teacher from Visva-Bharati University, a university founded by Rabindranath Tagore at Santiniketan. The twenty minutes documentary features the life and works of Mukherjee in the form of paintings and photographs, starring himself. The documentary covers his journey from childhood till his blindness along with much of his works and features his words, "Blindness is a new feeling, a new experience, a new state of being". The documentary was awarded as Best Information Film (Documentary) at 20th National Film Awards in 1972.

Mukherjee is known as the most informed Indian artist of his generation and a legend of modern Asian Art. Born with severe eye problem, being myopic on one eye and blind in the other, Mukherjee lost his sight completely after an unsuccessful cataract operation. However, he continued his work as an artist.

The Academy Film Archive, part of the Academy Foundation, took an initiative to restore Satyajit Ray's films and could successfully restore 19 Ray films. The Inner Eye is yet to be restored but found to be in good condition for the restoration. The film's original script was included in a book named Original English Film Scripts Satyajit Ray, put together by Ray's son Sandip Ray.

== Background ==
Benode Behari Mukherjee was an Indian artist, born on 7 February 1904, into a well-educated family in Behala, in the state of West Bengal. He could not pursue normal schooling due to his poor eyesight. However, his family recognized his interest for art and literature and sent him to Santiniketan for further studies in an art faculty, Kala Bhavan. He eventually became a teaching staff member at Santiniketan in 1925. Later he joined as a curator at the Nepal Government Museum in Kathmandu and taught at the Banasthali Vidyapith, Rajasthan, during 1951–52. He returned to Kala Bhavan in 1958 and then became the principal of art theory. He lost his eyesight completely in an unsuccessful cataract operation. As an artist, Mukherjee worked with different media like murals, watercolor, and oils. In his work, he used a complex fusion of idioms absorbed from Western modern art and the spirituality of oriental traditions. In 1974, he was awarded with Padma Vibhushan, the second-highest civilian award in the Republic of India. Mukherjee died on 19 November 1980, at the age of 76.

== Synopsis ==
The documentary begins by showcasing a process by which a wall, 5 feet (1.5 m) high by 60 feet (18 m) wide, of a newly developed building in Santiniketan would be decorated by 20 murals designed by Benode Behari Mukherjee. While the narrator (Satyajit Ray) describes Mukherjee's family, Mukherjee himself explains the process of mural making and how he spends most of his time alone in Santiniketan with his favourite drink, tea. Mukherjee, the youngest child of his family among six children, is shown spending his initial days as a student in Santiniketan with his drawings and paintings. He was a student of Nandalal Bose, another acclaimed painter from Santiniketan. The film mentions Bose's influence of Mukherjee's initial work with his own "striking" originality.

The film then features Mukherjee's journey to Japan where he learned from noted Japanese artists, including Tawaraya Sōtatsu and Toba Sōjō. It shows Mukherjee's first fresco on the ceiling of the new dormitory of Kala Bhavan, executed using earth colours to display a pond surrounded by rural life around Santiniketan. The documentary also shows another fresco drawn at China Bhavana which displays life at the Santiniketan campus. Mukherjee himself then explains another fresco done at the Hindu Bhavana in Santiniketan covering three walls of the central hall, which displays religious themes of Medieval India and its uniqueness of not having any preliminary tracing.

Covering Mukherjee's tenure at the National Museum of Kathmandu and his Nepalese frescoes at Banasthali Vidyapith, Rajasthan, the film also highlights his own school at Dehradun. It describes Mukherjee's failed cataract operation which led him to lose his eyesight completely. It finally shows the now-blind Mukherjee painting some of his works. The film ends with Mukherjee's own words, "Blindness is a new feeling, a new experience, a new state of being". A sitar composition by Nikhil Banerjee plays in the background, composed in the Hindustani classical morning raga Asavari, indicating optimism.

== Credits ==
=== Cast ===
- Benode Behari Mukherjee as himself

=== Crew ===
- Narration: Satyajit Ray
- Cinematography: Soumendu Roy
- Sound recording: J. D. Irani and Durgadas Mitra
- Editor: Dulal Dutta
- Laboratory Processing: Gemini Color Lab, Madras and Eastmancolor

=== Music ===
- Music: Satyajit Ray
- Sitar composition: Nikhil Banerjee

== Restoration ==
After the Academy of Motion Picture Arts and Sciences awarded Satyajit Ray an honorary Academy Award in 1992 for his lifetime achievements, the Academy Film Archive, part of the Academy Foundation, which mainly works with objectives as "preservation, restoration, documentation, exhibition and study of motion pictures" took an initiative to restore and preserve Ray's films. Josef Lindner was appointed as a preservation officer and as of October 2010 the Academy could successfully restore 19 Ray titles. The Inner Eye, shot with 35mm interpositive, was found to be in good condition. The film was then partially repaired with mylar and its Eastmancolor negative had tears at notches.

== In media ==
At "Ray Festival 2009", Satyajit Ray Society screened The Inner Eye along with other three Ray documentaries, namely Two, Rabindranath Tagore and Sukumar Ray on 7 May 2009. The film's original script was included in a book named Original English Film Scripts Satyajit Ray, put together by Ray's son Sandip Ray along with an ex-CEO of Ray Society, Aditinath Sarkar. The book also includes original scripts of Ray's other films.

== Awards ==
National Film Awards (India)

- 20th National Film Awards (1972): Best Information Film (Documentary)
