= Mama Bhagne =

Rock formation in West Bengal

Mama Bhagne Paharh is a rock formation near Dubrajpur town of Birbhum district in the Indian state of West Bengal.

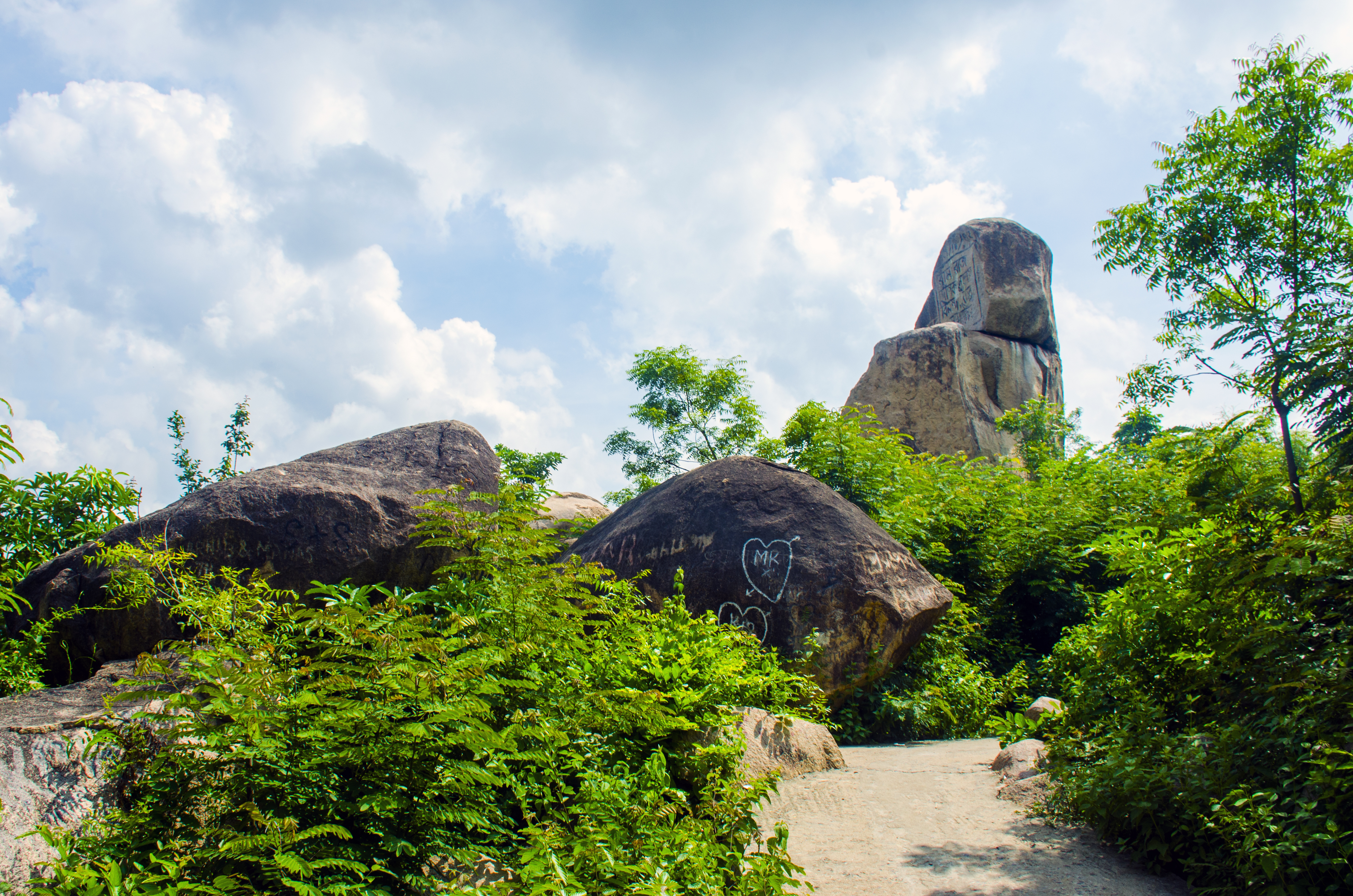
Mama Bhagne Pahar

== The area ==
It is a pair of almost spherical natural boulders of granite rock, one balancing on the top of other. The balancing of the rocks are so surprising that it is a famous landmark in West Bengal, where it is known as Mama Bhagne (the maternal uncle and the nephew). The site has a number of boulders splintered across the place. It is the extreme eastern part of the Chota Nagpur Plateau where "the granite is gray and composed of glassy quartz pink, gray feldspar and black mica". Those rocks were formed due to the extension of the Chota Nagpur Plateau before many years. At the base of the rocks there is a temple of Shiva entitled Pahareswar.

== Mythology ==
When Rama decided to attack Ravana, he found it necessary to throw a bridge across the straits for the conveyance of his troops, he drove in his aerial chariot to the Himalayas, picked up what stones he needed and drove back. As he was passing Dubrajpur his horses took fright and tilted up the chariot and so some stones fell out. These are the stones at Mama Bhagne.

There is another legend to the effect that they were collected by Viswakarma, at the command of Shiva, to erect in one night a second Kasi. When he collected the rocks and was about to commence work day dawned and so he left. A temple named Pahareshwar is situated at the bottom of hills.

== In popular culture ==
The rock formation is a thematic motif of the movie Abhijan by Satyajit Ray, where the rocks are seen as symbols of human being carrying its sin accumulated over time. A Feluda story of Satyajit Ray, named Robertsoner Ruby spotted in Mama Bhagne hill area.

== Gallery ==
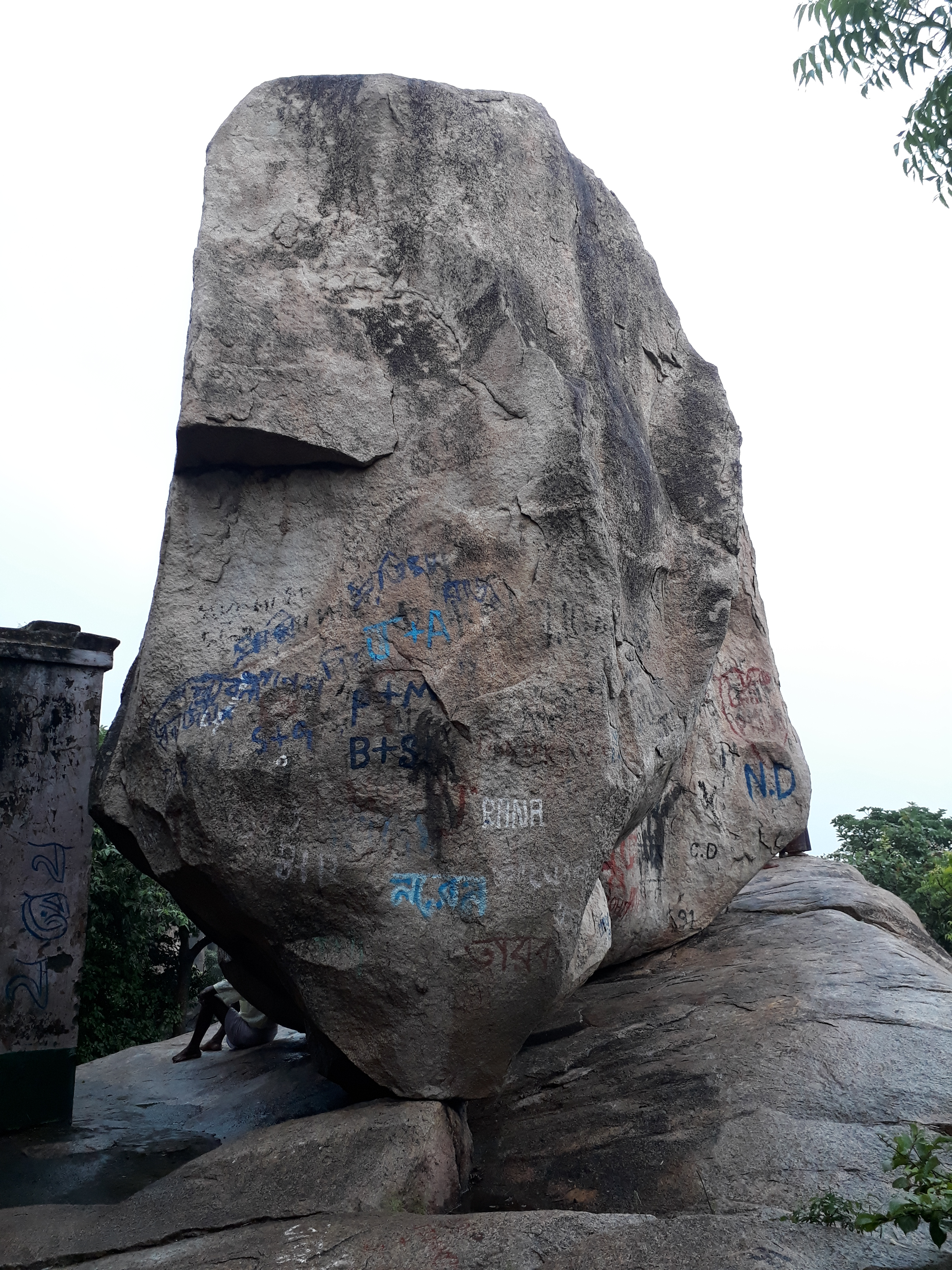
Mama Bhagne rocks

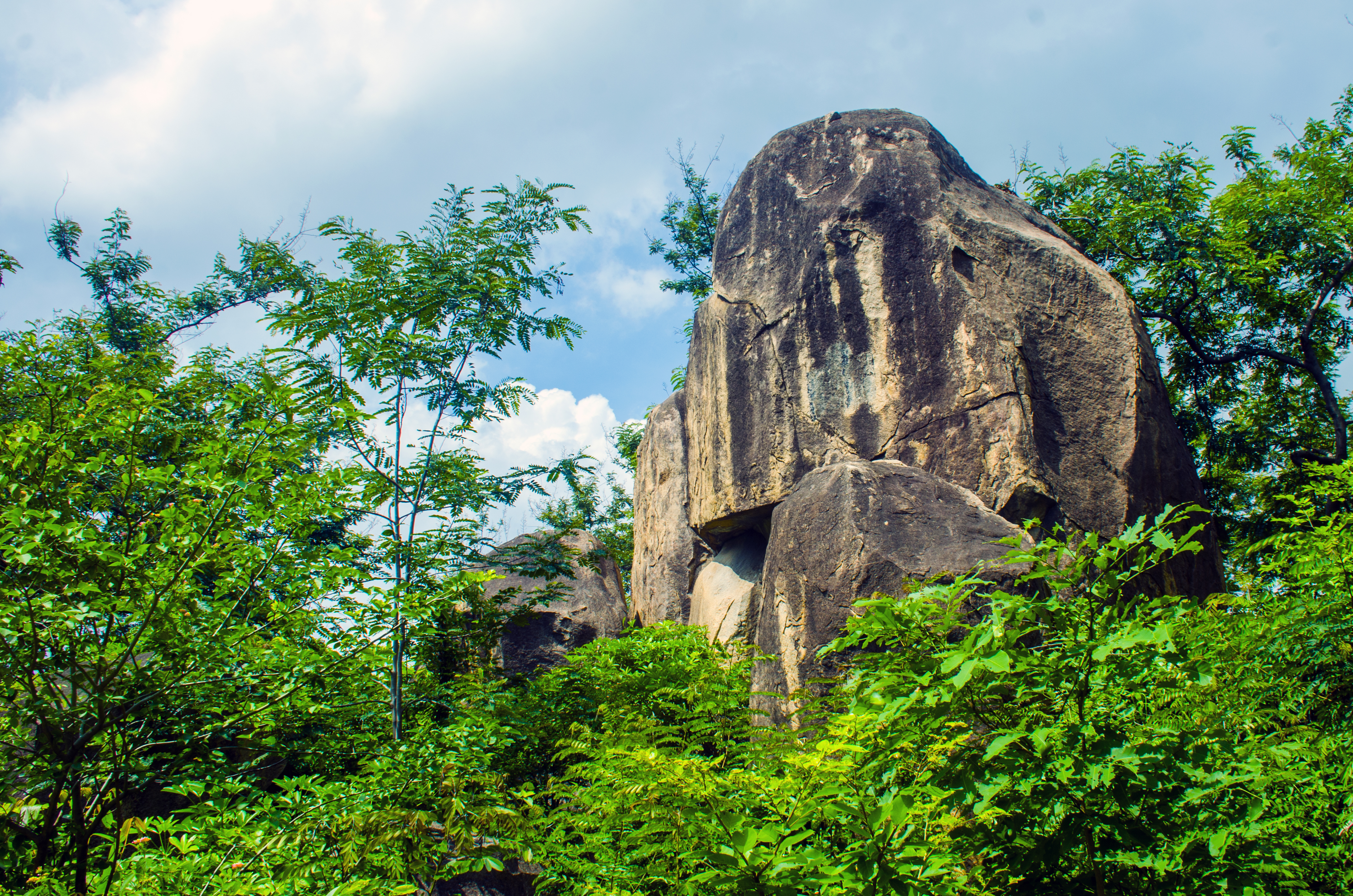
Mama Bhagne Pahar

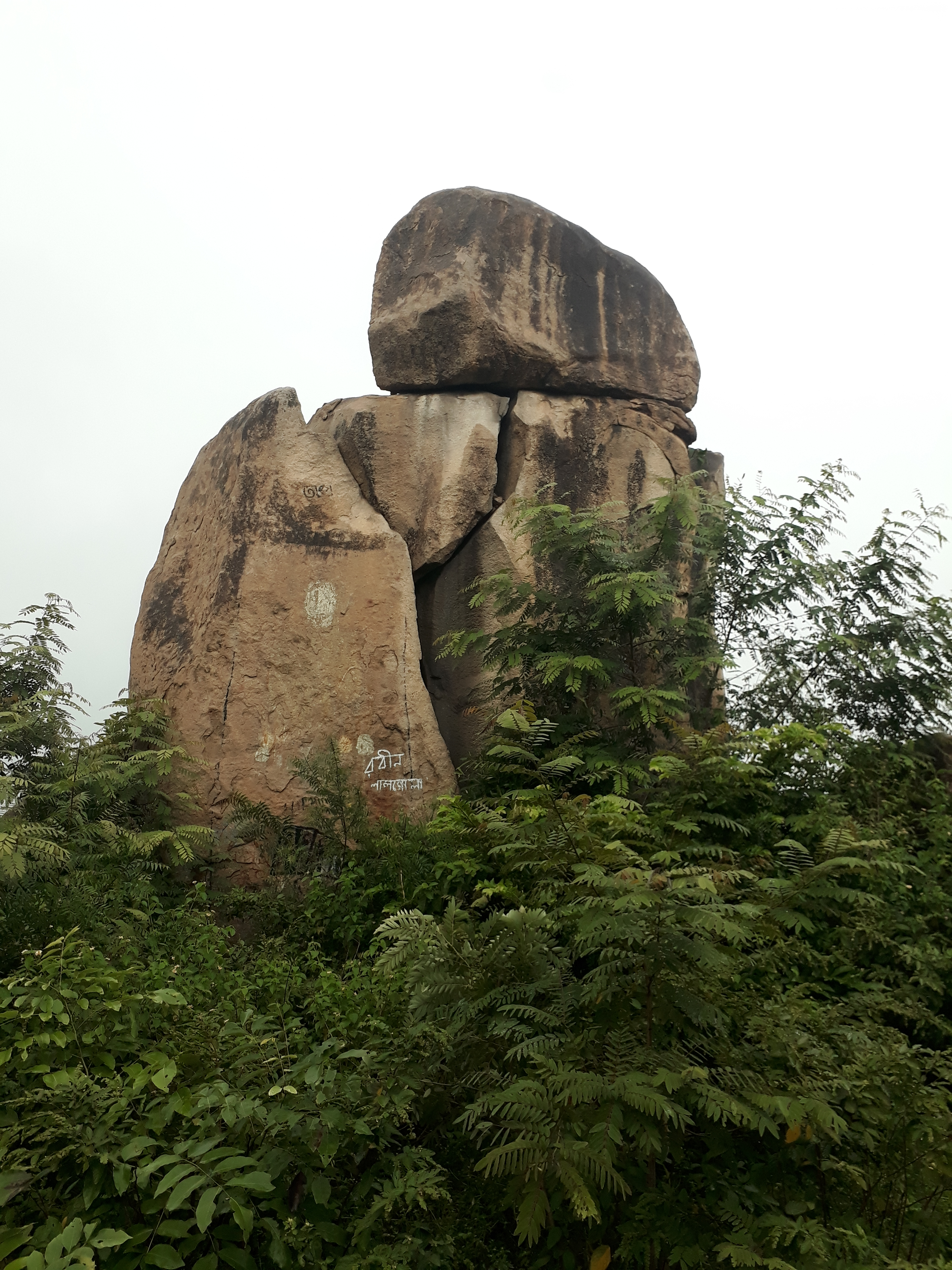
Mama Bhagne Hills

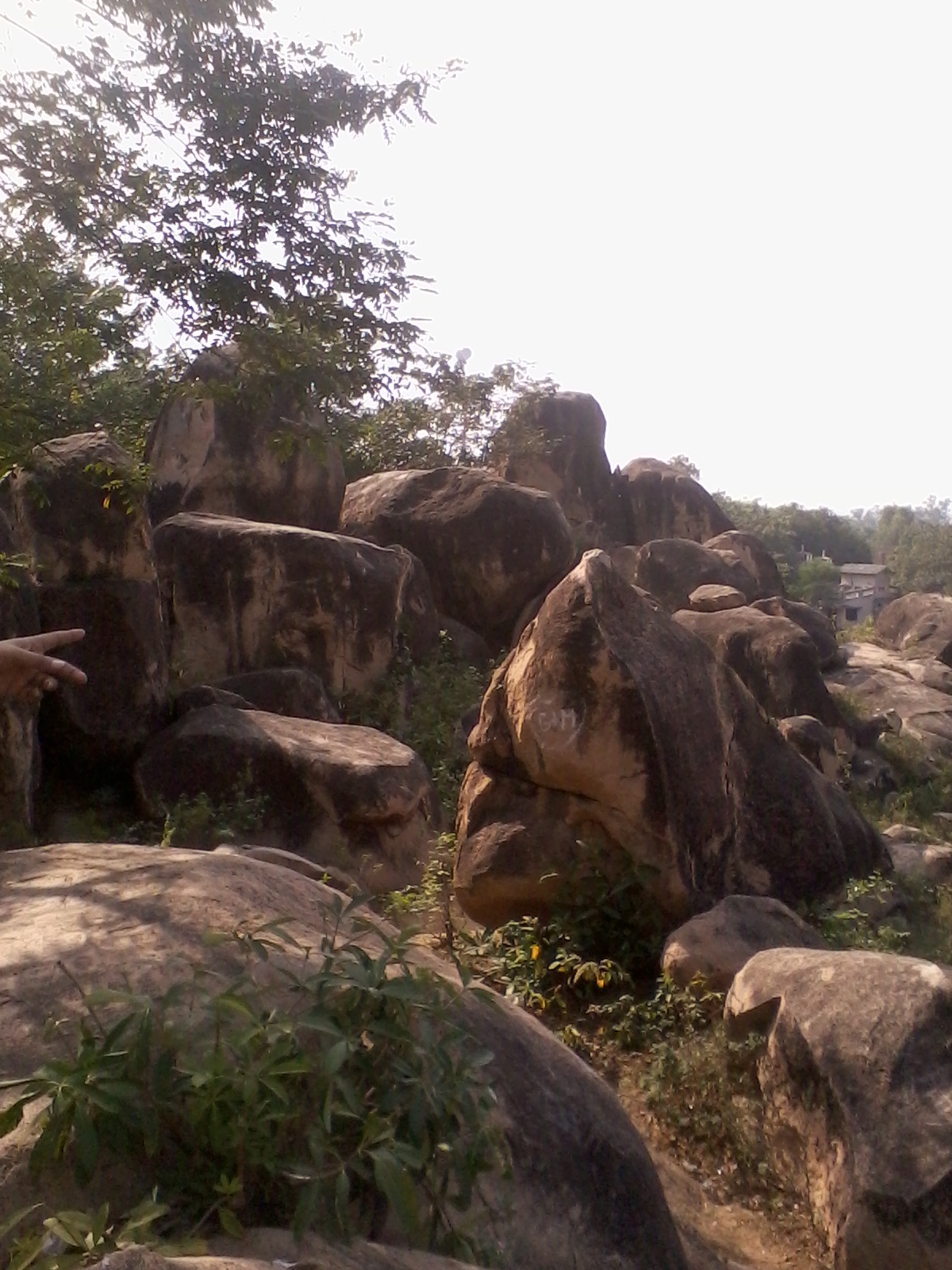
The area is dotted with such boulders

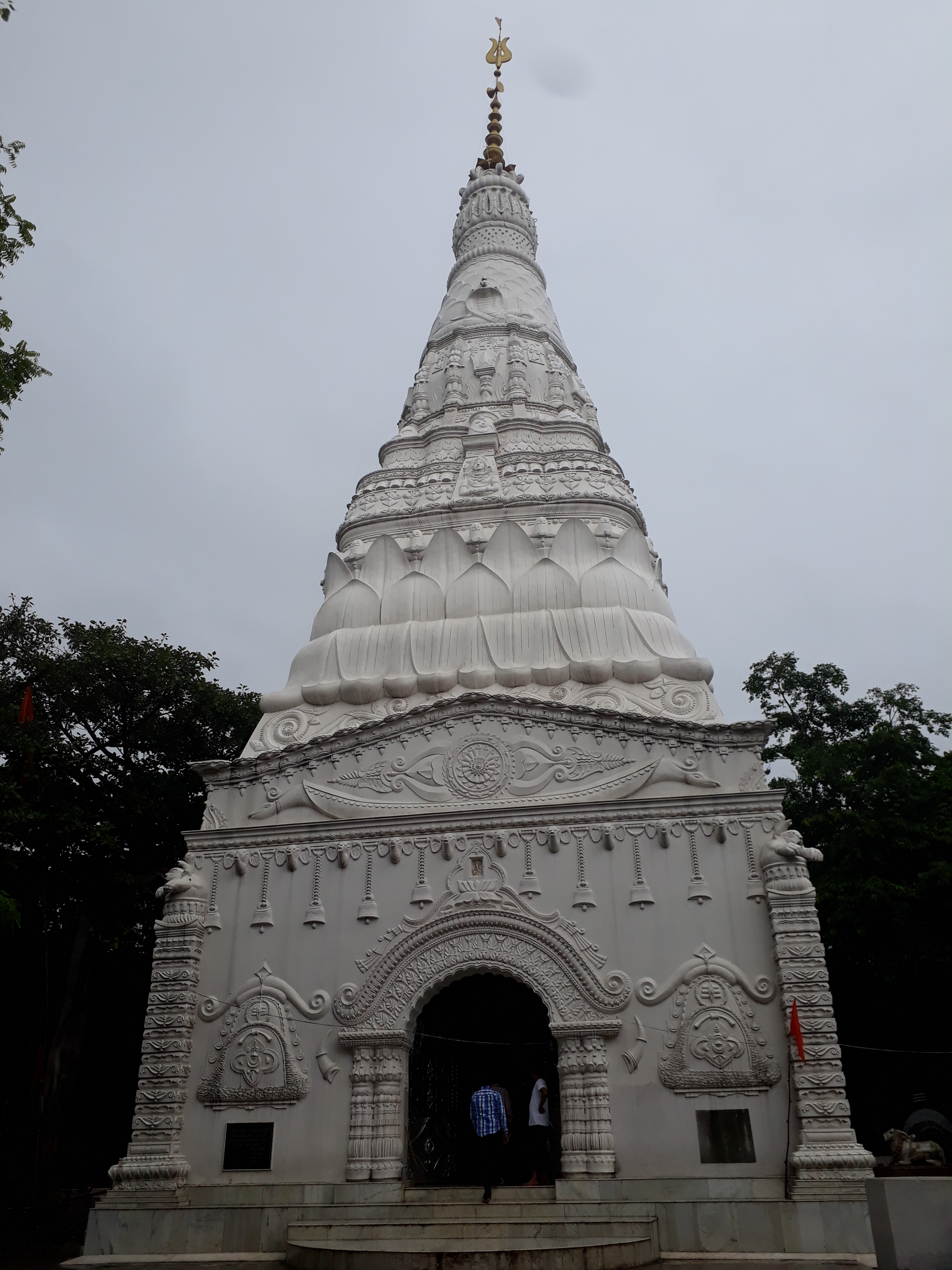
Pahareshwar Temple

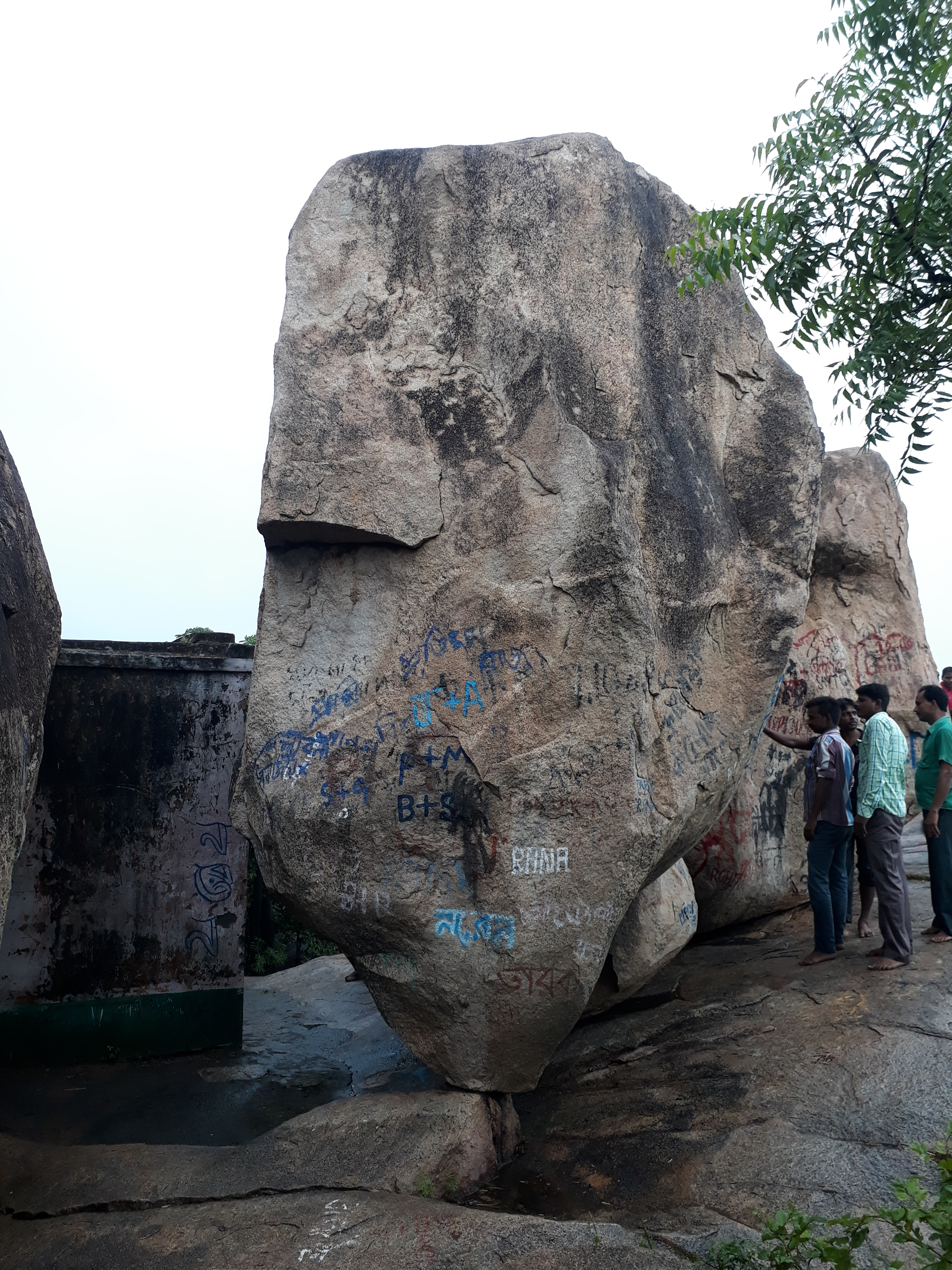
Mama Bhagne rock

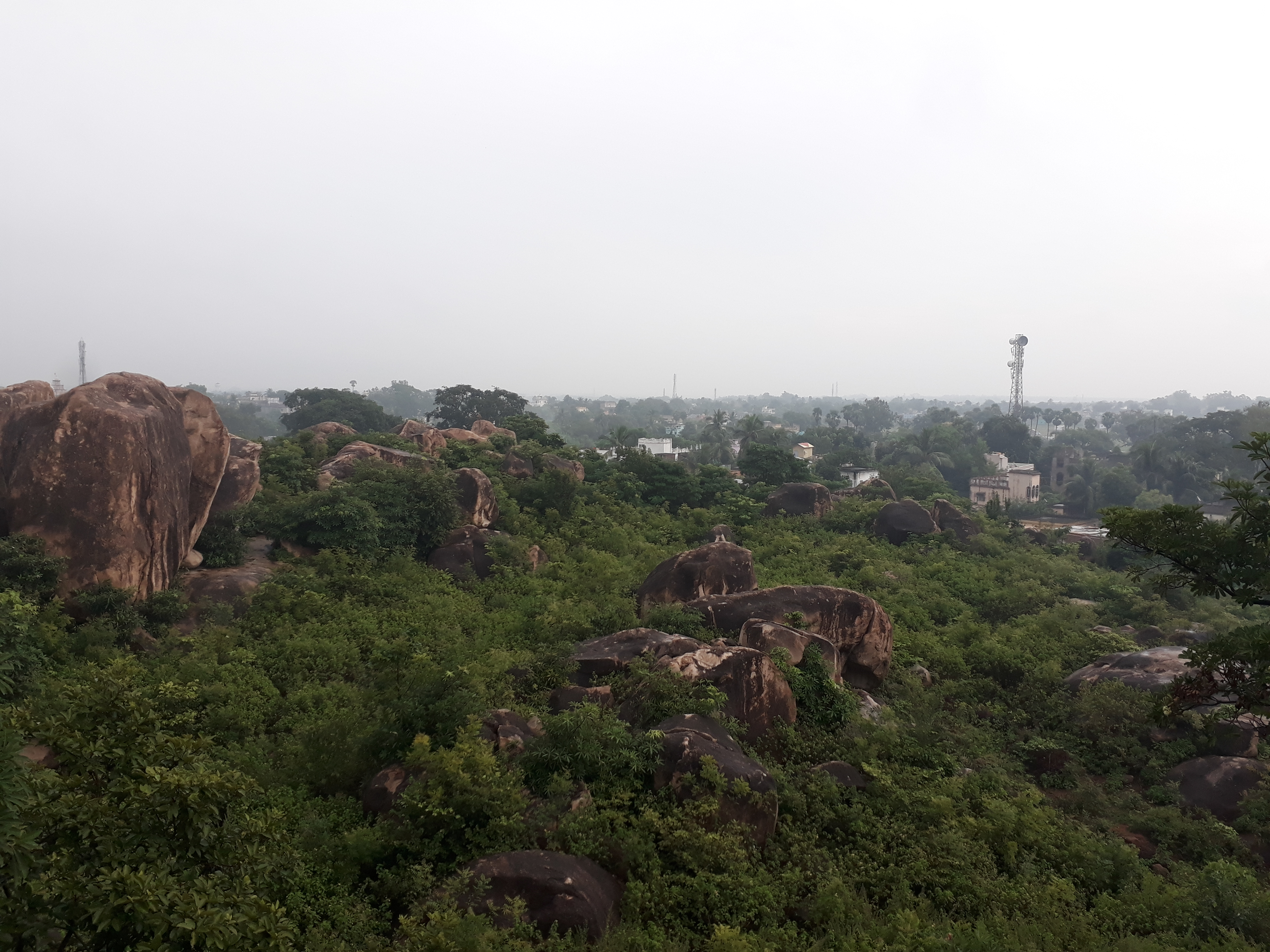
View of Dubrajpur town from Mama Bhagne Hills
