= Jayadeb =

1962 Odia film directed by Byomkesh Tripathy

- Directed by: Byomkesh Tripathi
- Produced by: Kalyan Gupta
- Starring: Sahu Samuel, Shefali and Byomkesh Tripathi
- Music by: Balakrishna Das
- Release date: 1962
- Country: India
- Language: Odia

Jayadeb is a 1962 Odia film directed by Byomkesh Tripathi about Jayadeva a well known Sanskrit poet and lyricist of Orissa

== Cast ==
- Sahu Samuel
- Miss Shefali
- Byomkesh Tripathi
