= Sankar (writer) =

Indian writer (1933–2026)

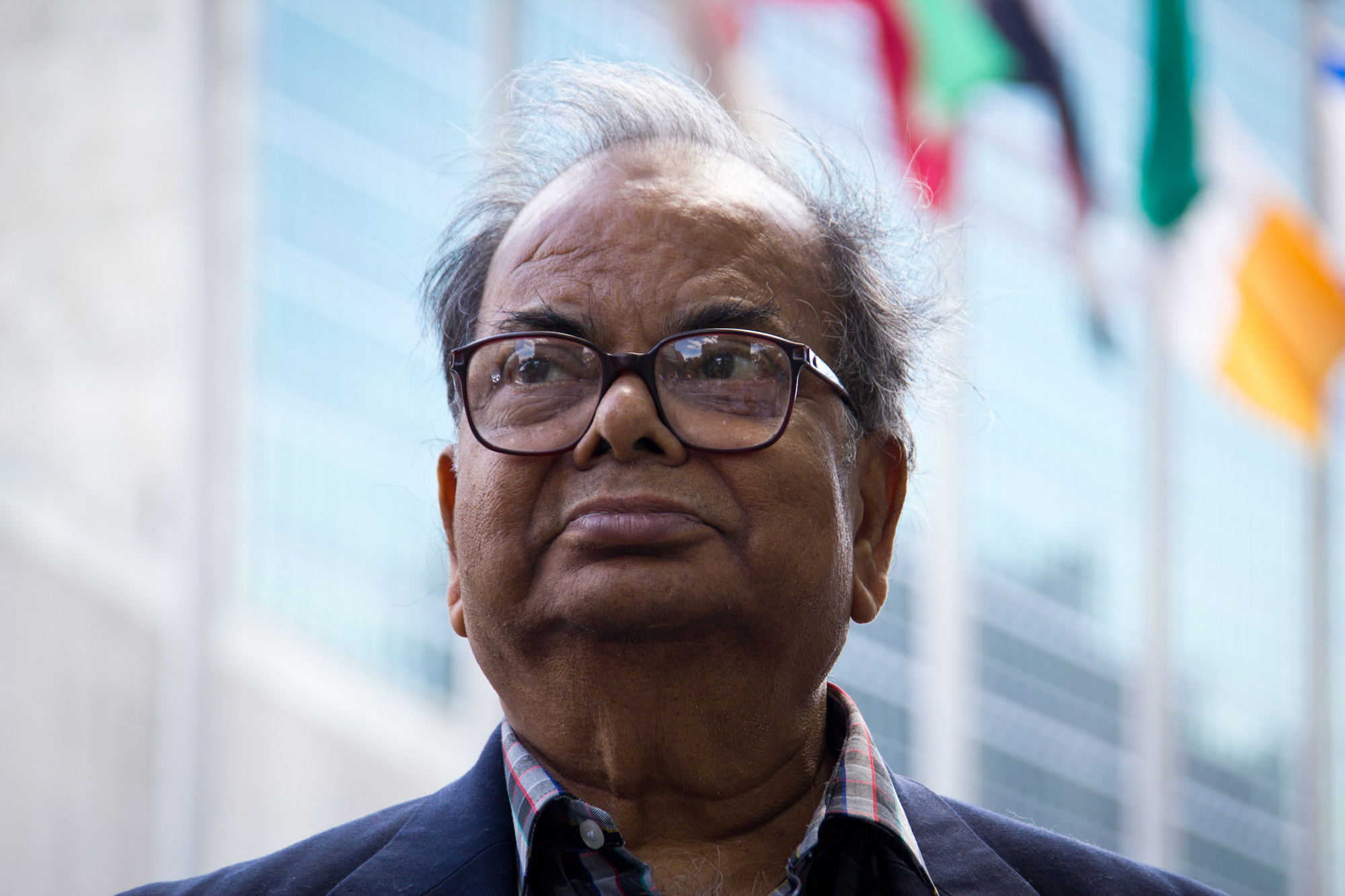
- Sankar in 2011
- Born: Mani Sankar Mukherjee; 7 December 1933; Hindmotor, Hooghly district, Bengal Presidency, British India (present-day Hooghly, West Bengal)
- Died: 20 February 2026 (aged 92); Kolkata, West Bengal, India
- Occupations: Writer; novelist; essayist; researcher
- Known for: Books on Swami Vivekananda, Bengali novels
- Awards: Bankim Puraskar; Sahitya Akademi

Mani Sankar Mukherjee (7 December 1933 – 20 February 2026), commonly known by his pen name Sankar in both Bengali- and English-language literature, was an Indian writer in the Bengali language, who also served as the Sheriff of Kolkata. He grew up in Debdoot Sheet Nagar in Howrah of West Bengal.

== Early life and education ==
Sankar was the son of Avaya Mukherjee. Sankar's father died while he was still a teenager, as a result of which Sankar became a clerk to the last British barrister of the Calcutta High Court, Noel Frederick Barwell. At the same time, he entered in Surendranath College (formerly Ripon College, Calcutta) for study. He had various jobs, such as typist, cleaner, private tutor and hawker.

== Literary career ==
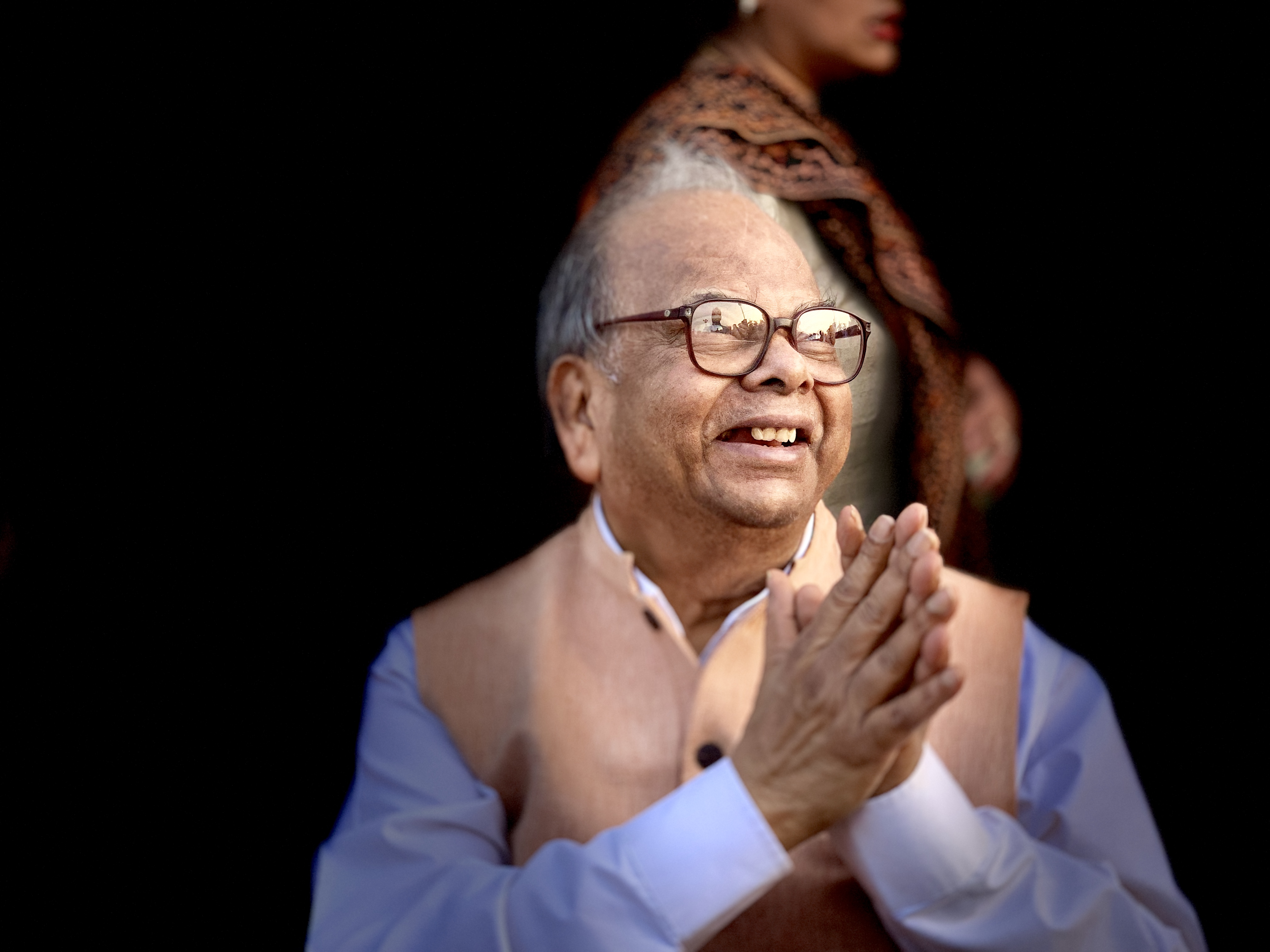
Mukherjee in 2019

After Noel Barwell's sudden death, Sankar, the professional version of his name adopted for the law courts, sought to honour Barwell. "First, I wanted to build a statue. It was not possible. I then wanted to name a road. Even that was not feasible. And then I decided to write a book about him," according to Sankar. That impetus led to his first novel, about Barwell, that according to some critics is perhaps the most stimulating -- Kato Ajanare (So Much Unknown).

Around the same time in 1962, Sankar conceived Chowringhee on a rainy day at the waterlogged crossing of Central Avenue and Dalhousie – a busy business district in the heart of Kolkata. The novel, set in the opulent hotel he called Shahjahan, was made into a cult movie in 1968. It is wrongly said that Sankar marketed his literary work to Bengali households with the marketing slogan A bagful of Sankar (Ek Bag Sankar) and collections of his books were sold in blue packets through this marketing effort. He was rewarded with Sahitya Akademi Award on 18 March 2021 for his outstanding autobiographical work of Eka Eka Ekashi.

== Death ==
Sankar died on 20 February 2026, at the age of 92. He had been hospitalised 15 days prior.

== Works ==
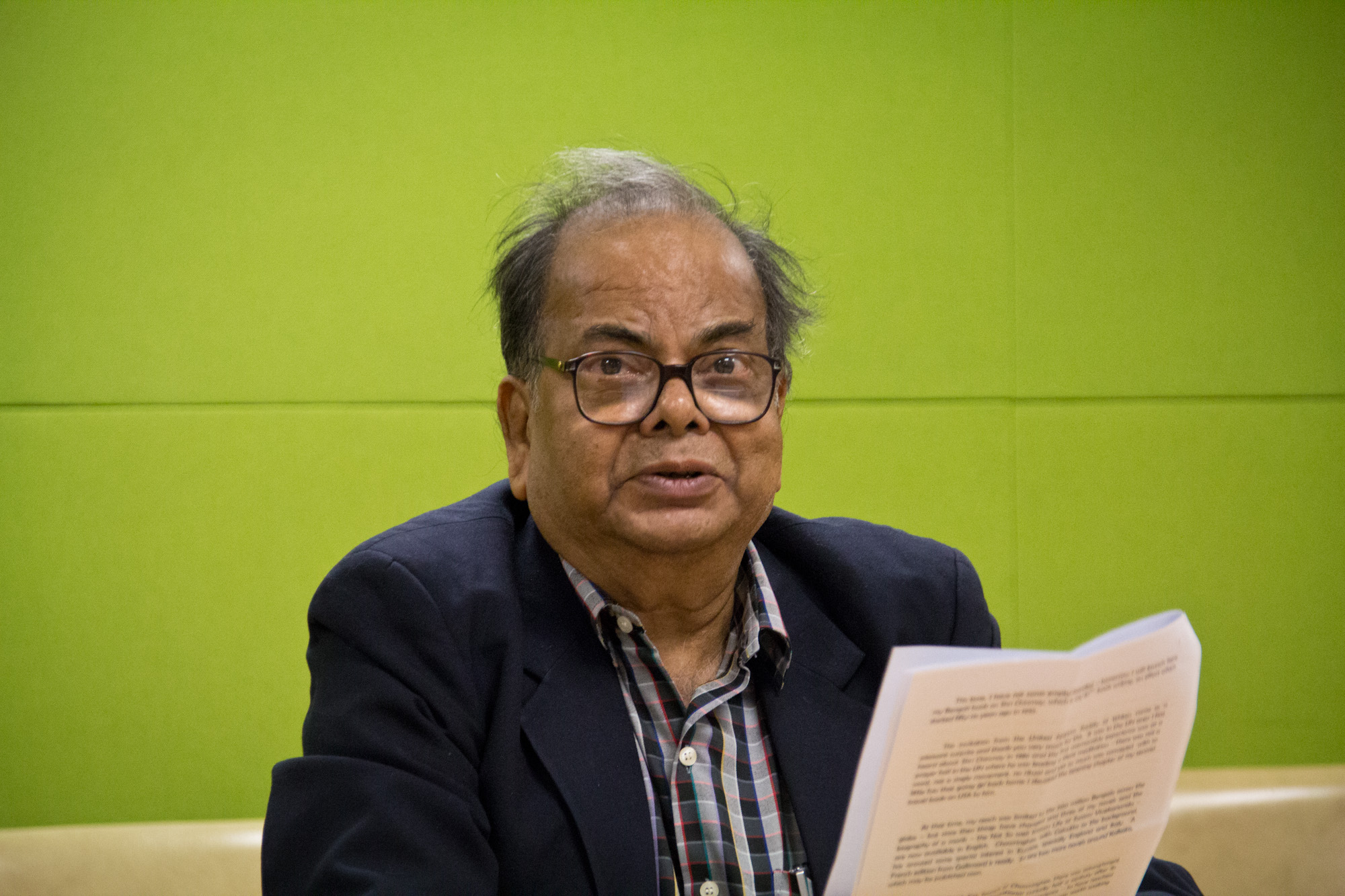
Sankar, speaking at the UN

- Jekhane Jemon (travelogue) (As It Is There)
- Kato Ajanare (novel) (The Many Unknowns) - his debut novel.
- Nivedita Research Laboratory (novel)
- Abasarika ISBN 978-81-7612-777-6
- Chowringhee (novel) (1962)
- Swarga Martya Patal- (collection of three stories: Jana Aranya (The Sea of People), Seemabaddha (Limited Company) and Asha Akangsha (Hopes and Desires))
- Gharer Madhye Ghar
- Nagar Nandini
- Banglar Meye ISBN 978-81-7079-454-7
- Simanta Sambad ISBN 978-81-7079-554-4
- Kamana Basana ISBN 978-81-7079-978-8
- Purohit Darpan
- Sri Sri Ramkrishna Rahsyamrito
- Purohit Darpan
- Mone Pare
- Mansamman (1981)
- Samrat O Sundari (novel)
- Charan Chhunye Jai ISBN 978-81-7079-528-5
- Bangalir Bittasadhana - Saharar Itikatha ISBN 81-7267-045-1
- Jaabar Belay ISBN 978-81-7267-066-5
- Mathar Opor Chhad
- Patabhumi ISBN 978-81-7612-637-3
- Rasabati ISBN 978-81-7612-637-3
- Ek Bag Sankar (collection) ISBN 978-81-7079-091-4
- Kamana Basana ISBN 978-81-7079-978-8
- Sonar Sangsar
- Chhayachhabi (collection)
- Muktir Swad
- Subarno Sujog
- ABCD
- Charan Chhunye Jai (Vol 2) ISBN 978-81-7612-888-9
- Bittabasana
- Eka eka ekashi
- Rup tapos

=== Works in translation ===
- Chowringhee translated by Arunava Sinha into English ISBN 978-0-14-310103-1 and ISBN 978-1-84354-913-0. Translation is pending into Italian. In 2013 the novel has been translated into French by Dr Philippe Benoit, Sanskritist and head of Bengali department of Paris National Institute of Oriental Languages and Civilizations (INALCO), published by Gallimard house.
- The Middleman translated by Arunava Sinha from "Jana Aranya" into English ISBN 978-0-14-306671-2.
- The Great Unknown translated by Soma Das from "Kato ajanare" into English ISBN 978-0-670-08443-2.
- Thackeray Mansion translated by Sandipan Deb from "Gharer Madhye Ghar" into English ISBN 978-0-143-42006-4.

== Screen adaptations ==
- Many of Sankar's works have been made into films. Some notable ones are – Chowringhee, Jana Aranya and Seemabaddha, out of which the last two were directed by Satyajit Ray.
- In 1959, Ritwik Ghatak started making a film Kato Ajanare based on Sankar's first novel.
- His novel, Man Samman, was turned into a film by Basu Chatterjee, Sheesha (1986), starring Mithun Chakraborty, Moonmoon Sen and Mallika Sarabhai.
- Shah Jahan Regency (2019) by Srijit Mukherji and starring Starring Abir Chatterjee, Anjan Dutt, Mamata Shankar, Parambrata Chatterjee, Rudranil Ghosh, Anirban Bhattacharya, Swastika Mukherjee, Kanchan Mullick, Rittika Sen, Rituparna Sengupta.

== Awards ==
- 1993 – Bankim Puraskar for Gharer Moddhe Ghar
- Sahitya Akademi Award: 2021
- ABP Ananda Sera Bangali Award ("Sera'r Sera"): 2022

== See also ==
- Nrisingha Prasad Bhaduri
