= Jana Aranya =

Jana Aranya (The Middleman)
- Directed by: Satyajit Ray
- Written by: Satyajit Ray (screenplay); Sankar (novel)
- Produced by: Indus Films (Subir Guha)
- Starring: Pradip Mukherjee; Satya Banerjee; Deepankar De; Lily Chakravarti; Gautam Chakravarti; Aparna Sen; Sudesna Das; Utpal Dutt; Rabi Ghosh
- Cinematography: Soumendu Roy
- Edited by: Dulal Dutta
- Music by: Satyajit Ray
- Release date: 20 February 1976
- Running time: 131 mins
- Country: India
- Language: Bengali

Jana Aranya (English title: The Middleman) is a 1976 Bengali film directed by Satyajit Ray, based on the novel of the same name by Mani Shankar Mukherjee. It is the last among Ray's Calcutta trilogy, the previous two being Pratidwandi (The Adversary, 1970) and Seemabaddha (Company Limited, 1971).

== Plot ==
The film portrays the economic difficulties faced by middle-class, educated, urban youth in 1970s India.

After achieving only moderate academic results and making numerous unsuccessful attempts to find a job, Somnath (Pradip Mukherjee), the central protagonist struggles in his daily life. One day while Somnath was walking down a lane in the crowded Burrabazar area of urban Kolkata, he slips over a banana peel, and coincidentally meets Bishuda(Utpal Dutt). He confesses to Bishuda about his unsuccessful attempts in getting a suitable job for himself. Bishuda advises him to start his own business. Somnath finally decides to start his own business as a middle-man—i.e. a self-employed salesman. He soon however finds himself involved in unethical behaviours, which is contrary to his upbringing. His friend Sukumar, having gone through similar ordeals but finally being unable to land a job, becomes a taxi-driver.

One day, Somnath finds that in order to land a big order, he must propitiate a client by supplying him with a prostitute. Despite his hesitation and after trying several brothels, Somnath, with the help of a more experienced operator, finds a girl for the purpose. However, she turns out to be his friend Sukumar's sister. Embarrassed and at a loss, Somnath offers her money and requests her to leave, but the girl refuses. Her purpose is to earn money, not beg, she tells him. Somnath delivers her to his client and lands the contract but is remorseful.

== Cast ==
- Pradip Mukherjee - Somnath
- Kalyan Sen - Mr. Bakshi
- Satya Bandyopadhyay - Somnath's Father
- Deepankar De - Bhombol, Somnath's elder brother
- Arati Bhattacharya - Mrs. Ganguli
- Gautam Chakraborty - Sukumar
- Lily Chakravarty - Kamala, Bhombol's wife
- Bimal Chatterjee -Mr. Adok
- Bimal Deb - Jagabandhu
- Santosh Dutta - Hiralal Saha
- Utpal Dutt - Bishuda/Biswanath Bose
- Rabi Ghosh - Natabar Mittir
- Soven Lahiri - Goenka
- Padmadevi - Mrs. Biswas
- Aparna Sen - Somnath's ex-girlfriend
- Sudeshna Das - Kauna / Juthika

== Reception and awards ==
The film is generally considered to be one of the darker and more cynical ones in Ray's filmography, even by Ray himself. On Rotten Tomatoes, the film holds a score of 88% based on 8 reviews with an average rating of 6.53/10. Jonathan Rosenbaum of The Chicago Reader considers it to have "the best performances of any Ray film I've seen and a milieu that may remind you of both Billy Wilder's The Apartment and John Cassavetes's Faces." Time Out considers it to be "absorbing viewing". Leah Garchik of SF Gate compared the film to Michael Moore's Roger & Me (released 15 years after this film), writing that "[w]here Moore hits you over the head with his point, though, Ray's presentation is much more sophisticated and elegant." Despite criticizing the film's middle as being "bogged down", she praises the film's use of sound as being "remarkable. [...] From the very start, when Somnath is pictured taking his final exam, there's no background music; all you hear is the squeaking of pens on paper. The film's silences are more attention-getting and mesmerizing than the most demanding background music." She concludes that the film "evokes an insidious amorality that he sees as an inevitable side effect of the huge pressures from within the family and outside to get ahead and make something of oneself." Bhaskar Chattopadhyay, writing for Firstpost, called it "Ray's most cynical, ruthless film". He writes that the "film’s most brutal scenes": "Ray literally, and perhaps for the first time in his filmmaking career, bares his fangs and pokes us in the eye to show us what a strange and hopeless world we live in. Shot beautifully in black and white, with the use of light to symbolically cover only one half of most faces in the night scenes, juxtaposing the ruthless streets and markets against a loving and caring sister-in-law at home who supports him no matter what, and once again focusing on the human content more than the external glamour, Ray puts Somnath in a world of shocks and surprises, only to make him realise, that beginning right from education, to employment, to entrepreneurship, there is no country for an honest man." Times of India shared a similar view, calling the "film’s climax [...] an out and out shocker in which Somnath faces a startling dilemma of epic proportions, and just like Ray visualizes he fails to choose the right path, and he is now neither noble, nor a hero." Vincent Canby of The New York Times gave the film a rave review writing "More than any other Ray film rye seen, “The Middleman” defines hopelessness." calling it "bleak and pessimistic".

A negative review came from Elliott Stein of Film Comment, who gave the film one star out of four. He called it "predictable" and criticized the central performance from Mukherjee, calling him " a drab performer whose loss of innocence is uninvolving." Despite this, he praised some of the film's "near-Dickensian passages" and praised Rabi Ghosh's performance as the "“public relations” man who becomes the Brahmin's mentor in petty capitalism."

The film has been nominated for and won the following awards since its release: Best Direction New Delhi, 1975; Best Film, Direction, Screenplay, Government of West Bengal, 1975 and Karlovy Vary Prize, 1976.

== Preservation ==
The Academy Film Archive preserved Jana Aranya in 1996.
