= Target (1995 film) =

- Directed by: Sandip Ray
- Written by: Sandip Ray; Satyajit Ray; Prafulla Roy
- Based on: Manushar Juddha; 1005 novel by Prafulla Roy
- Produced by: Jason Lovas; Zachary Lovas
- Starring: Mohan Agashe; Barun Chakraborty; Champa
- Cinematography: Barun Raha
- Edited by: Dulal Dutta
- Release date: 1995
- Running time: 100 min (UK)/122 min (USA)
- Country: India
- Language: Hindi/Bengali

Target is a 1995 Indian Hindi-language drama film directed by Sandip Ray based on the novel Manushar Juddha, written by Prafulla Roy. The film is centred on the relationship between Singh, a cruel, manipulative landowner and his workers that belong to the caste of pariahs.

== Plot summary ==
An affluent landowner named Singh, known for his prowess in hunting, has succumbed to the influence of alcohol. Consequently, Singh enlists the services of a professional, Bharosa, to assist him. Bharosa resides among the untouchables, the marginalized members of society. It is within this community that he encounters Bijri, a young woman of striking beauty, and becomes acquainted with her story.

== Cast ==
- Mohan Agashe - Vindhyachal Singh
- Barun Chakraborty - Chaupatial
- Champa - Bijari
- Gyanesh Mukherjee - Rampear
- Om Puri - Rambharosa
- Anjaan Srivastav - Choubey

== Reception ==
Stephen Holden of The New York Times wrote that "The performances are strong enough to lift Target from the realm of the too-obvious and lend its fairy-tale ending a sense of epic inevitability".

Reviewing the film at the Indian Panorama section of the International Film Festival of India, S. R. Ashok Kumar of The Hindu wrote that "Sandip Ray's directorial ability is proved in this film".
