= Seemabaddha =

Seemabaddha (Company Limited)
- Directed by: Satyajit Ray
- Written by: Satyajit Ray
- Based on: Seemabaddha by Mani Shankar Mukherjee
- Produced by: Chitranjali (Bharat Shumsher Jung Bahadur Rana)
- Starring: Barun Chanda; Harindranath Chattopadhyay; Sharmila Tagore; Haradhan Bandopadhyay; Parumita Chowdhury; Indira Roy; Promod Ganguli; G. H. Mani Iyer
- Cinematography: Soumendu Roy
- Edited by: Dulal Dutta
- Music by: Satyajit Ray
- Release date: September 24, 1971
- Running time: 112 minutes
- Country: India
- Language: Bengali

Seemabaddha (English title: Company Limited) is a 1971 social drama Bengali film directed by Satyajit Ray. It is based on the novel Seemabaddha by Mani Shankar Mukherjee. It stars Barun Chanda, Harindranath Chattopadhyay, and Sharmila Tagore in lead roles. The film was the second entry in Ray's Calcutta trilogy, which included Pratidwandi (The Adversary) (1970) and Jana Aranya (The Middleman) (1976). The films deal with the rapid modernization of Calcutta, rising corporate culture and greed, and the futility of the rat race. The film won the FIPRESCI Award at the 33rd Venice International Film Festival, and the National Film Award for Best Feature Film in 1971.

== Plot ==
Tutul and Shyamal at a race course (film still)

Shyamal (Barun Chanda) is an ambitious sales manager in a British fan manufacturing firm in Calcutta, where he is expecting a promotion shortly. He is married to Dolan and lives in a company flat. He aspires to become the company director.

His sister-in-law, Tutul (Sharmila Tagore), arrives from Patna to stay with them for a few days. She is given a tour of the life they lead and the many upscale spaces they inhabit—the restaurants, the beauty parlours, clubs and race courses. Tutul, whose father Shyamal had once been a student under, greatly admires him and his idealism. Secretly she is envious of her sister's marriage with him.

Life goes on smoothly for Shyamal until he learns that a consignment of fans meant for export is defective just before the shipment of a prestigious order. The problem is that the fans were painted with a flaw. The company is under a contract requiring the shipment be delivered on time. There is a clause permitting delay in case of civil disturbance. To escape blame, Shyamal hatches a plan with the labour officer to provoke a strike at the factory. A factory watchman is badly injured, a false riot is organised, and a lock-out is declared. The delay caused by the strike and riot are used by the company to allow strikebreakers to make needed repairs.

For his "efficient" handling of the crisis, Shyamal is promoted, and there is congratulations all around. However, he has fallen in the eyes of Tutul and himself.

== Cast ==
- Sharmila Tagore as Tutul (Sudarsana)
- Barun Chanda as Shyamal (Shyamalendu) Chatterjee
- Paromita Chowdhury as Dolan (Shyamal's wife)
- Harindranath Chattopadhyay as Sir Baren Roy
- Dipankar Dey as Sen
- Ajoy Banerjee as Talukdar
- Haradhan Bandopadhyay as Nilambar
- Indira Roy as Shyamal's mother
- Promod Ganguli as Shyamal's father
- Miss Shefali

== Production ==
The backdrops for the film included the Orient Fan Factory, the Union Carbide office, and the Calcutta Swimming Club, all in Kolkata. Some scenes were also shot in Patna.

== Awards ==
- 33rd Venice International Film Festival: FIPRESCI Award
- 1971: National Film Award for Best Feature Film: Satyajit Ray
