= Miss Shefali =

Indian Bengali actress (1944–2020)

- Born: 1944; Narayanganj, British India
- Died: 6 February 2020 (aged 76); Sodepur, Kolkata, West Bengal, India
- Other name: Arati Das
- Occupations: Actress, Dancer

Miss Shefali, also known as Arati Das (1944 – 6 February 2020) was an Indian Bengali actress and dancer who was recognized for her work in Bengali cinema. She had worked with film director Satyajit Ray in classics like Pratidwandi and Seemabaddha. She is known as the Queen of Bengali cabaret.

== Early life and background ==
Arati Das was the youngest of three sisters from a Bengali Hindu family of Narayanganj, East Bengal (now in Bangladesh) which migrated to India during the Partition of Bengal. She started performing cabaret at the age of 11 at Firpo's hotel and later in the Grand Hotel to earn for her family and then there was no looking back.

== Career ==
Arati Das had made her film debut in Bengali film named Chowringhee, in which she acts with actors like Supriya Devi, Uttam Kumar, Utpal Dutt, and Biswajit. Besides films, she also acted in several stage plays and theater. Her plays include Samrat O Sundari, Saheb Bibi Golam, and Ashlil. She was also a writer. Her autobiography Sandhya Rater Shefali (Shefali of the Evenings and Nights) was published recently.

== Personal life ==
An American national named Robin Rootland once wanted to marry her, but she decided to stay in India as unmarried for her family.

== Selected filmography ==
1. Jayadeb (1962) Oriya film
2. Bhoot Bungla (1965) Hindi film
3. Mere Huzoor (1968)
4. Baharoon Ki Manzil(1968) as Rosi
5. Chowringee (1968)
6. Ustad 420 (1969)
7. Raaton Ka Raja (1970)
8. Veer Ghatothkach (1970)
9. Pratidwandi (1970)as Latika
10. Heer Ranjha(1970)
11. Aag Aur Daag (1970) as Lily
12. Brahma Bishnu Mahesh (1971)
13. Seemabaddha (1971)
14. Company Limited (1971)
15. Lal Patthar (1971)
16. Caravan (1971) as a gypsy dancer
17. Shor(1972)
18. Samrat O Sundari
19. Ashlil
20. Call Girl (1975)
21. Madhosh (1975)
22. Ponga Pandit (1975)
23. Apne Dushman (1975)
24. Gumrah (1976)
25. Aloor Thikana (1976)
26. Bullet (1976)
27. Hum Kisise Kum Naheen (1977)
28. Hatyara (1977)
29. Saheb bibi Golam
30. Ram Balram (1980)
31. Pennam Calcutta (1992)
