= Rabindranath Tagore (film) =

1961 film by Satyajit Ray

- Title card of the film
- Directed by: Satyajit Ray
- Written by: Satyajit Ray
- Screenplay by: Satyajit Ray
- Based on: Life and works of Rabindranath Tagore
- Produced by: Films Division of India
- Starring: Raya Chatterjee; Sovanlal Ganguli; Smaran Ghosal; Purnendu Mukherjee; Kallol Bose; Subir Bose; Phani Nan; Norman Ellis
- Narrated by: Satyajit Ray
- Cinematography: Soumendu Roy
- Edited by: Dulal Dutta
- Music by: Jyotirindra Moitra
- Distributed by: Films Division of India
- Release date: 1961
- Running time: 54 minutes
- Country: India
- Language: English

Rabindranath Tagore is a 1961 Indian documentary film written and directed by Satyajit Ray about the life and works of Bengali author and Nobel laureate Rabindranath Tagore. Ray started working on the documentary in early 1958. Shot in black-and-white, the finished film was released during the birth centenary year of Rabindranath Tagore, who was born on 7 May 1861. Ray avoided the controversial aspects of Tagore's life in order to make it as an official portrait of the poet. Though Tagore was known as a poet, Ray did not use any of Tagore's poetry as he was not happy with the English translation and believed that "it would not make the right impression if recited" and people would not consider Tagore "a very great poet," based on those translations. Satyajit Ray has been reported to have said about the documentary Rabindranath Tagore in his biography Satyajit Ray: The Inner Eye by W. Andrew Robinson that, "Ten or twelve minutes of it are among the most moving and powerful things that I have produced."

Often regarded as polymath, author of Gitanjali and its "profoundly sensitive, fresh and beautiful verse," Tagore became the first non-European to win the Nobel Prize in Literature in 1913. The first stanza of Tagore's five-stanza Brahmo hymn has been adopted as the National Anthem of India, "Jana Gana Mana." The first ten lines of another Tagore song, "Amar Shonar Bangla" were adopted in 1972 as the Bangladesh's national anthem. Incidentally, Sri Lanka's national anthem "Sri Lanka Matha" was written and composed by Tagore's student, Ananda Samarakoon.

Academy Film Archive, part of the Academy Foundation, took an initiative to restore Satyajit Ray's films and could successfully restore 19 Ray films, Rabindranath Tagore is restored though its original print was found to be badly damaged. The film's original script was included in a book named Original English Film Scripts Satyajit Ray, put together by Ray's son Sandip Ray.

== Background ==
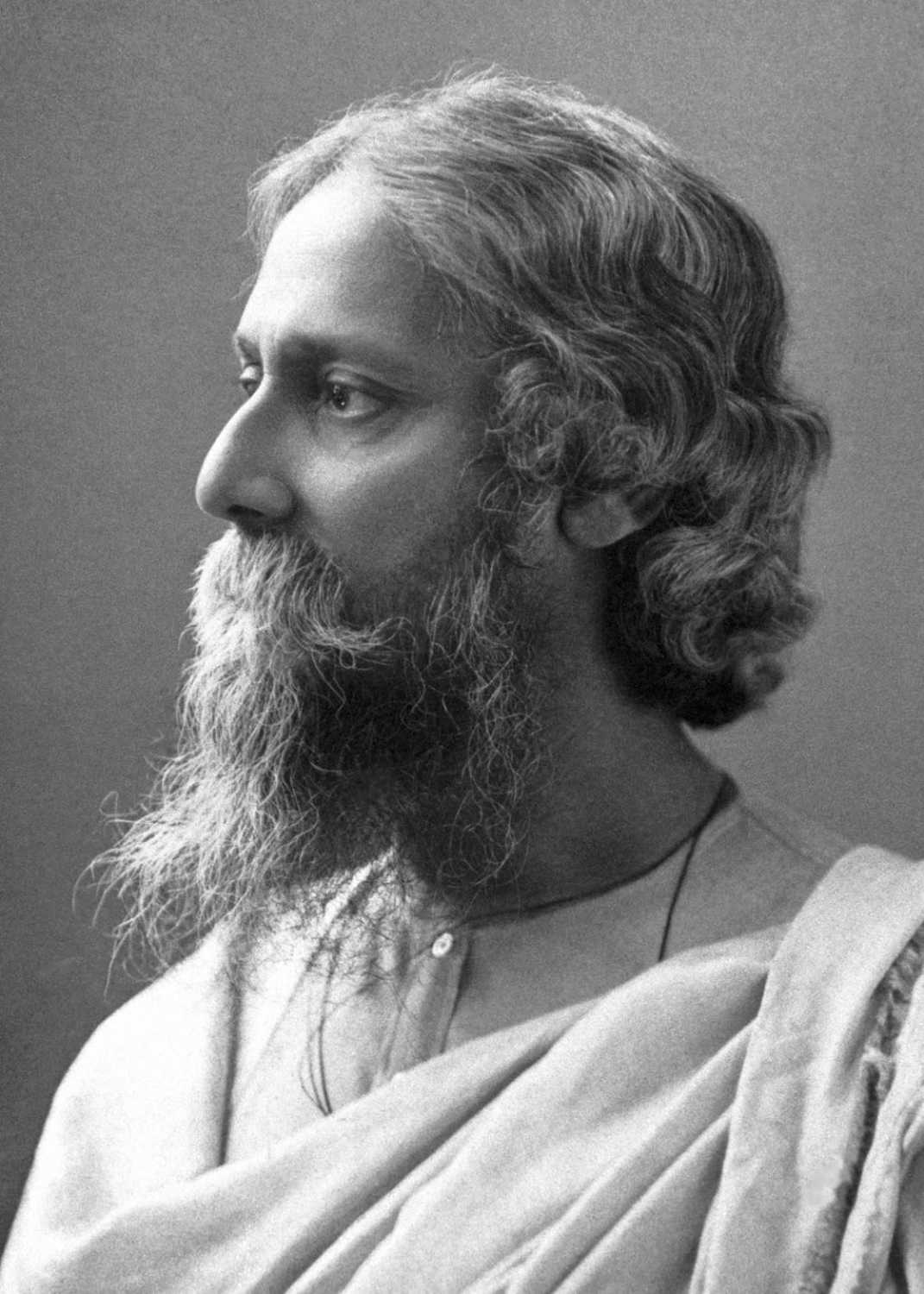
Rabindranath Tagore

Rabindranath Tagore was born on 7 May 1861 to Debendranath Tagore and Sarada Devi, the youngest of thirteen surviving children. At the age of seventeen, he was sent to London for higher education, however, he did not finish his studies there. He started a school at Santiniketan which was based on Upanishadic ideals of education. He also participated in the Indian independence movement. Tagore became the first non-European to win the Nobel Prize in Literature in 1913. He was awarded for his collections of poems, Gitanjali (Song Offerings), which included 103 poems with his own English translations of his Bengali poems. In 1915, the British Crown granted Tagore a knighthood. He renounced it after the 1919 Jallianwala Bagh massacre. At the age of 80, Tagore died on 7 August 1941 in his ancestral home in Calcutta.

== Synopsis ==
Narrated by Satyajit Ray, the film begins with the funeral procession of Rabindranath Tagore. Briefly mentioning about Kolkata, then known as "Calcutta", the documentary explains the Tagore lineage, starting with Dwarkanath Tagore. While documentary mentions Dwarkanath Tagore's elder son Debendranath Tagore's association with an Indian religious, social, and educational reformer Raja Rammohun Roy and introduces some of his children out of fourteen, it moves to the birth of child Rabindranath Tagore, fondly called as "Robi". The film then narrates Robi's initial schooling days, his trip to northern India with his father, publication of his first poem in his father's magazine and his failed attempt for higher education at London.

The documentary showcases some of the scenes of Tagore's first drama-opera, Valmiki Pratibha (The Genius of Valmiki), where he used western classical music along with Raga-based songs to narrate sage Valmiki's story and himself acted in the lead role. Mentioning about his marriage with Mrinalini Devi, the documentary explains his aim to form a new school at Santiniketan and its different education system, death of his wife and children in the short span of time and his association in Indian independence movement. It then narrates Tagore's visit to England in 1912 where his English translated poems from Gitanjali were introduced to English painter William Rothenstein, who in-turn showed them to the Irish poet W. B. Yeats. This helped Gitanjali for its publication in England and fetched Tagore the Nobel Prize in Literature in 1913 and a Knighthood in 1915.

While showcasing Tagore's formation of Visva-Bharati University, the documentary mentions his renouncement of his knighthood, in response to the Jallianwala Bagh massacre in 1919. It also documents his world journey for fund collection for his school, his paintings and his 70th birthday where a book, The Golden Book of Tagore, was published with the testimonials by intellectuals of the world, including French dramatist Romain Rolland, German theoretical physicist Albert Einstein, Greek poet Kostis Palamas, Indian Polymath Jagadish Chandra Bose and Indian political leader Mohandas Karamchand Gandhi. The documentary ends while mentioning about Tagore's last days, his last message to the world Civilization in Crisis and his death at his birthplace at the age of 80 on 7 August 1941.

== Credits ==
=== Cast ===
- Raya Chatterjee
- Smaran Ghosal
- Purnendu Mukherjee
- Kallol Bose
- Subir Bose
- Phani Nan
- Norman Ellis

=== Crew ===
- Narrator: Satyajit Ray
- Editor: Dulal Dutta
- Production controller: Anil Chowdhury
- Art direction: Bansi Chandragupta
- Sound designer: Sujit Sarkar
- Cinematographer: Soumendu Roy
- Music direction: Jyotirindra Moitra
- Make-up: Sakti Sen
- Sound recording: Satyen Chatterjee and Durgadas Mitra

== Restoration ==
After the Academy of Motion Picture Arts and Sciences awarded Satyajit Ray an honorary Academy Award in 1992 for his lifetime achievements, the Academy Film Archive, part of the Academy Foundation which mainly works with the objectives as "preservation, restoration, documentation, exhibition and study of motion pictures", took an initiative to restore and preserve Ray's films. Josef Lindner was appointed as a preservation officer and as of October 2010 the Academy has successfully restored 19 titles. However, the documentary Rabindranath Tagore was found to be badly damaged.

== In media ==
Satyajit Ray has been reported to have said about the documentary Rabindranath Tagore in his biography Satyajit Ray: The Inner Eye by W. Andrew Robinson that, "Ten or twelve minutes of it are among the most moving and powerful things that I have produced". At "Ray Festival 2009", Satyajit Ray Society screened Rabindranath Tagore along with other three Ray documentaries, namely Two, The Inner Eye and Sukumar Ray on 7 May 2009. The film was also shown at 51st Valladolid International Film Festival along with other seven Ray films. The film's original script was included in a book named Original English Film Scripts Satyajit Ray, put together by Ray's son Sandip Ray along with an ex-CEO of Ray Society, Aditinath Sarkar, which also included original scripts of Ray's other films.

== Awards ==
National Film Awards (India)

- 9th National Film Awards (1961): President's gold medal for the Best Documentary Film

Locarno International Film Festival (Switzerland)

- 14th Locarno International Film Festival (1961): Golden Sail, Short Films

Montevideo Film Festival (Uruguay)

- Montevideo Film Festival (1962): Special Mention
