= Chiriyakhana =

- Film Poster
- Directed by: Satyajit Ray
- Written by: Sharadindu Bandyopadhyay; Satyajit Ray
- Produced by: Harendranath Bhattacharya
- Starring: Uttam Kumar
- Narrated by: Ajit
- Cinematography: Soumendu Roy
- Edited by: Dulal Dutta
- Music by: Satyajit Ray
- Production company: Star Productions
- Distributed by: Balaka Pictures
- Release date: 29 September 1967
- Running time: 125 min.
- Country: India
- Language: Bengali

Chiriakhana or Chiriyakhana (English: The Menagerie) is a 1967 Indian Bengali-language crime thriller film, based on the story of the same name by Sharadindu Bandyopadhyay. The film is directed and co-written by Satyajit Ray, starring Uttam Kumar as Byomkesh Bakshi.

== Plot ==
Private detective Byomkesh Bakshi and his best friend and partner, author Ajit Kumar Banerjee are chatting when a new client, Mr Nishanath Sen, knocks on the door. Nishanath is a middle-aged ex-judge and a rich merchant. He needs Byomkesh for a special reason. He is searching for the details of an old Bengali movie song ('Bhalobasar tumi ki jano') and the actress who sang it, Sunayana, as he thinks that she is hiding somewhere inside his huge nursery, Golap Colony, under a fake identity. Nishanath as a judge hanged at least twenty people, but after his retirement, due to lingering moral regrets, he has sheltered a few homeless people, who have either long criminal records or other qualities that make them social outcasts. Byomkesh listens to everything and accepts the case. Sen pays him the advance and requests that he visit his nursery.

Byomkesh meets a Bengali movie expert, Ramen Mullick, and learns about the movie producer's son Murari. He learns that while Murari was making love with Sunayana, he was murdered in his own room. 20,000 rupees and many gold ornaments were stolen from Murari's room. Suspecting Sunayana's role in Murari's murder, a court issued an arrest warrant against her, but she disappeared and her whereabouts are unknown. Ramen gives the details about the actress and also about the film and promises to assist Byomkesh.

The next day, Byomkesh and Ajit visit Sen's bungalow and nursery in the 24 Parganas district to meet the residents whom Sen has sheltered. Byomkesh comes disguised as a Japanese horticulturist named Okakura, while Ajit appears as his Indian assistant. Sen shows them the entire nursery including dairy, poultry and an orchid house. He introduces all the residents and Byomkesh photographs everyone. Within a few days, Sen makes another phone call to Byomkesh requesting him to visit again, but the conversation remains unfinished as Mr Sen is bludgeoned to death with a blunt weapon. Byomkesh and Ajit are visited the next day by a police inspector who wants their help on the murder Sen, not knowing of Byomkesh's pre-existing relations with Sen. Byomkesh and Ajit return to the colony and interrogate everyone concerned with Sen's nursery. After a thorough investigation, Byomkesh realises that the case will not prove easy to solve, as there are several motives and people behind Sen's death. After a few days, another murder occurred inside the Golap Colony: this time the victim is Panu, a deaf-mute and one of the suspects who witnessed Sen's murder. Panu's killer used the same weapon and method as was used to kill Sen.

Byomkesh again reaches the spot, examines everything and decides to record the interrogations with his voice recorder. He interrogates all the suspects: Bijoy (Mr Sen's nephew), Rasiklal, Muskil Mian, Brajo Das (employees of Sen), Nepal Gupta (a professor) and Dr. Das (a physician and sitarist), and all the women, including Mrs Damayanti (Sen's widow), Mukul (Nepal's daughter) Nazar bibi (Muskil's wife) and Banalakshimi – one among the list of suspects. Byomkesh takes an old photograph of Sunayana and tries to match it with all the women under suspicion, but he is unable to make a match.

Shortly after the latest round of interrogations, Brajo comes to Byomkesh's house and confesses about his lord's personal life. He says that Damayanti Sen was not Sen's legal wife but a live-in partner. Many years ago, Sen sentences Damayanti's husband Lal Singh to death for a criminal case. But Lal is not hanged, but rather imprisoned for 14 years because of the concession given from a high court. Lal later kills a person to steal his car. He takes parts of the car and throws them through Sen's bungalow window every fortnight to threaten him. Lal often visits Damayanti secretly for money. But Byomkesh's investigation reveals many other possibilities too. He finds a tape of Dr. Das playing his sitar in the doctor's room; this tape was played in the background during the murder of Sen (the tape was heard by Byomkesh through the phone). Byomkesh also finds that Bijoy abandoned Mukul for Banalaxmi. Byomkesh knows that Sen would not have agreed to the relationship of Bijoy with Banalaxmi, so there is a chance that Bijoy murdered Sen in order to marry Banalaxmi and inherit Sen's wealth.

In his room, Byomkesh notices a plastic flower, which triggers a new line of thinking in him. He quickly takes the photo of Sunayana and compares it with the four women's photos and goes for a detailed analysis. He calls everyone and finally reveals Dr. Das as the person behind the murder of Sen and Panu. Dr. Das earlier said that he was playing sitar in his room when the murder was happening. But this statement was disproven when Byomkesh found the tape that was playing in Dr. Das's room during the murder; the argument that he was in his room playing his sitar was Das's alibi. Byomkesh shows them the stolen jewellery and contract papers of 'Sunayana' which Das was hiding for a long time. Banalakshmi, the employee of this nursery, is revealed as the actress Sunayana and the wife of Dr Das. She declares that she underwent plastic surgery to change her face (which Byomkesh realized while contemplating the plastic flower). Finally Banalakshmi confesses that her husband exploited her beauty to make money and how he murdered Murari, Sen, and Panu to destroy all the evidences of his criminality.

== Cast ==
- Uttam Kumar as Byomkesh Bakshi
- Shailen Mukherjee as Ajit Kumar Banerjee (renamed Ajit Chakraborty)
- Sushil Majumder as Nishanath Sen
- Kalipada Chakraborty as Rasiklal De (debut)
- Jahar Ganguli as Ramen Mallick
- Subhendu Chatterjee as Bijoy, nephew of Nishanath
- Prasad Mukherjee as Nepal Gupta, a chemist and ex-professor
- Bankim Ghosh as Brajadas
- Nripati Chattopadhyay as Mushkil Mia
- Subrata Chatterjee as Nazar Bibi, Muskil Mia's wife
- Kanika Majumdar as Damayanti
- Shyamal Ghoshal as Dr. Bhujangadhar Das
- Nilotpal De as Inspector Barat
- Chinmoy Ray as Panu Gopal, the mute victim
- Geetali Roy as Sunayana/Banalakshmi/Nrityakali Das
- Shekhar Chatterjee
- Rupak Majumdar

== Awards ==
Occasion	Award	Awardee	Result
15th National Film Awards	Best Direction	Satyajit Ray	Won
15th National Film Awards	Best Actor	Uttam Kumar	Won

== See also ==
- Feluda
- Sherlock Holmes
- Byomkesh Bakshi in other media
