= Abhijan (1962 film) =

1962 Indian film

- Theatrical poster of Abhijan
- Directed by: Satyajit Ray
- Screenplay by: Satyajit Ray
- Story by: Tarasankar Bandopadhyay
- Produced by: Bholanath Roy
- Starring: Soumitra Chatterjee; Waheeda Rehman; Ruma Guha Thakurta; Gyanesh Mukherjee; Charuprakash Ghosh; Rabi Ghosh; Arun Roy
- Cinematography: Soumendu Roy
- Edited by: Dulal Dutta
- Music by: Satyajit Ray
- Production company: Abhijatrik
- Distributed by: Chhayalok Pvt. Ltd.
- Release date: 28 September 1962
- Running time: 150 minutes
- Country: India
- Language: Bengali

Abhijan (Bengali pronunciation: [ɔbʱiˈjan]; transl. The Expedition) is a 1962 Indian Bengali-language neo-noir road drama film written, scored and directed by Satyajit Ray. Produced by Bholanath Roy under the banner of Abhijatrik, the film is based on the 1946 eponymous novel by Tarasankar Bandyopadhyay. It stars Soumitra Chatterjee as Narsingh, a proud and hot-tempered Rajput taxi driver who loses his license after rash driving and gets entangled in a shady smuggling ring while reinventing his life on a drift to a rural town. The film also features Waheeda Rehman, Ruma Guha Thakurta, Gyanesh Mukherjee, Rabi Ghosh and Charuprakash Ghosh in other pivotal roles.

The film marks the fourth collaboration between Ray and Chatterjee, and also Rehman's debut in Bengali cinema. It was predominantly shot across Birbhum, especially in the Mama Bhagne hills, as a thematic motif where the rocks are seen as symbols of human being carrying its sin accumulated over time. Soumendu Roy and Dulal Dutta handled its cinematography and editing respectively.

Abhijan was theatrically released on 28 September 1962. It was critically and commercially successful. Chatterjee's character is often regarded as one of the most memorable onscreen characters in Indian cinema. Its influence also extends to world cinema, influencing films from British cinema, including Martin Scorsese's 1976 cult-classis Taxi Driver, starring Robert De Niro. At the 10th National Film Awards, Abhijan won the award for Second Best Feature Film. Apart from it, the film also received four accolades at the 26th Annual BFJA Awards, including Best Film, Best Director (Ray), Best Actor (Chatterjee) and Best Supporting Actor (Ghosh).

== Plot ==
Narsingh is a proud and hot-tempered taxi driver with a passion for his car, a vintage 1930 Chrysler, and for his Rajput heritage. A descendant of a royal Rajput family, his self-esteem is reflected through his inability to accept insult and defeat, as a result of which he even takes part in a small race with his car. He does not want to be the one who falls behind and develops a strong hatred for women and mankind in general. As a result of reckless driving, while overtaking a car which carried the district inspector, his licence is taken from him. He is utterly devastated, since the cab was his life after his wife had left him for good. Deeply affected by the insult and a feeling not belonging, he decides to go back to the land of the Rajput where his true lineage will be respected. While on an aimless journey, Narsingh is picked up by Seth Sukhanram, a local Marwari businessman involved in smuggling and human trafficking.

Sukhanram offers him a handsome fee to transport some goods which actually is opium. The realisation of the immoral trade puts Narsingh in a compromising position, but he decides to join hands with Sukhanram anyway. After all no one he saw was truly following the path of law and morality, not even his ideal and beloved Neeli.

Neeli runs away with the crippled lover of hers and Narsingh's deep distrust of women deepens. As a result, even after knowing that Gulabi is a victim of Sukhanram's trafficking he forces her to sleep with him without any emotional involvement. At this point he is almost on the verge of becoming the one he used to hate, the lawless ones who also fail to face the world.

Gulabi, on the other hand is a melancholy, demonstrative and beautiful village widow. Gulabi is instinctively drawn to Narsingh. In spite of losing her dignity, she still looks at the bright side of life and has trust that Narsingh is not immoral. She is attracted to him from the beginning and ready for a physical relationship, though not as a prostitute which Sukhanram intended her to be at that time, but as a village girl.

After he decides to join the gang of smugglers consisting of a legal deal and selling his car, he finds that all his friends that had been with him for so long, including Rama, and Neeli's brother, have abandoned him. He gets the money and social status he wanted but reduces himself to Mama Bhagne, a symbol of someone carrying the baggage of his own sin on his head, until he topples and is reduced to mere pebbles with no dignity. He changes, and rescues Gulabi just in time, before she was to be sold to the same lawyer who was a member of the smuggling racket he had thought of joining.

The tension of the good and evil collapses and the old car makes another journey into nothingness but with a halo of light ahead of it, the light of love.

== Cast ==
- Soumitra Chatterjee as Narsingh
- Waheeda Rehman as Gulabi
- Ruma Guha Thakurta as Mary Nilima / Neeli, Joseph's sister
- Rabi Ghosh as Rama, Narsingh's assistant
- Gyanesh Mukherjee as Joseph Rajani Das
- Charuprakash Ghosh as Seth Sukhanram
- Arun Roy as Naskar
- Shekhar Chatterjee as Rameswar, the bus driver
- Ajit Banerjee as Banerjee
- Reba Devi as Joseph and Neeli's mother
- Abani Mukherjee as Sukhanram's lawyer
- Bireswar Sen as the head of the taxi association
- Durgadas Banerjee as Mr. Mukherjee
- Nani Ganguly as the bus contractor

== Preservation ==
The Academy Film Archive preserved Abhijan in 2001.

The film

== Analysis and legacy ==
The film gives the famous Ray flavour in its composition, flow and dialogues, and use of symbols. Its protagonist has been called a "prototype" for the character of the cynical cab driver in Martin Scorsese's Taxi Driver (1976). Scorsese himself has credited Satyajit Ray as an inspiration for his own work.

== Awards ==
National Film Awards

- 1962: All India Certificate of Merit for the Second Best Feature Film
