= Sadgati =

- Based on: Sadgati by Premchand
- Written by: Amrit Rai; Satyajit Ray (Dialogue)
- Screenplay by: Satyajit Ray
- Directed by: Satyajit Ray
- Starring: Om Puri; Smita Patil; Mohan Agashe; Gita Siddharth; Richa Mishra
- Music by: Satyajit Ray
- Country of origin: India
- Original language: Hindi

Production
- Producer: Doordarshan
- Cinematography: Soumendu Roy
- Editor: Dulal Dutta
- Running time: 52 min

Original release
- Release: 1981

Sadgati (transl. Salvation [or] Deliverance) is a 1981 Hindi television film directed by Satyajit Ray, based on a short story of same name by Munshi Premchand. Ray called this drama of a poor Dalit "a deeply angry film [...] not the anger of an exploding bomb but of a bow stretched taut and quivering."

== Plot ==
Dukhi (Om Puri), a poor Dalit Grass cutter, is carrying a pile of grass as a gift to Upper cast Brahmin Maharaj Pandit Ghasiram (Mohan Agashe) for fixing an auspicious date (muhurat) for his daughter’s marriage. As he just cured from high fever, that's why her wife Jhuria (Smita Patil) asks him to go to Pandit tomorrow and gives him the food to eat before leaving but Dukhi denies all saying he will miss Pandit.

After asking Pandit to come to his house for fixing his daughter's marriage, Pandit scolds Dukhi saying he has many other works to do apart from going to Dukhi's house and keeps giving Dukhi one task after another. At first asks him to sweep the verandah clean, then asks him to bring pile of husks from a near store room and put it in cowshed and finally orders him to chop woods from a thick log lying below a Baniyan tree just outside Pandit's house.

Dukhi doesn't know how to chop woods properly but he hesitates to say so. The hungry and exhausted Dukhi becomes breathless while working under the scorching sun. The Brahmin’s wife (Gita Siddharth) thinks of giving him something to eat, but ultimately, out of contempt for his low caste, she does not give him any food. Dukhi, who has just recovered from a fever, grows extremely tired and rests under the banyan tree. At that moment, Pandit Ghasiram comes and forces him to get up, telling him to finish the work, and warns that if he does not complete it, he will not fix an auspicious date for his daughter’s marriage. Using all his remaining strength, Dukhi tries to chop the wood, but eventually collapses and dies.

After Dukhi dies, Pandit Ghasiram becomes panic-stricken. Following his wife’s suggestion, he goes to the people of the lower caste and asks them to take away Dukhi’s dead body, but no one agrees. When other Brahmins complain that they cannot pass along a path defiled by the body of a low-caste man, Ghasiram ties a rope to Dukhi’s feet carefully avoiding any touch of Dukhi’s corpse and drags the body away to a dumping ground. Afterwards, he sprinkles holy Ganges water on the spot where the body had lain, in an attempt to purify it.

== Cast ==
- Om Puri as Dukhi
- Smita Patil as Jhuria
- Mohan Agashe as The Priest
- Gita Siddharth as The wife
- Bhaiyalal Hedao as The Gond
- Richa Mishra as Dhania

== Reception ==
Shaikh Ayaz of The Indian Express noted, "Having the distinction of being Doordarshan’s first colour outing, Sadgati is 40 years old today but it’s message is still relevant".

== Awards ==
- National Film Award – Special Jury Award (feature film) - Satyajit Ray
