= Pratidwandi =

1970 film by Satyajit Ray

Pratidwandi (The Adversary)
- Film poster
- Directed by: Satyajit Ray
- Screenplay by: Satyajit Ray
- Based on: Pratidwandi by Sunil Gangopadhyay
- Produced by: Priya Films (Nepal Dutta, Asim Dutta)
- Starring: Dhritiman Chatterjee; Debraj Ray; Krishna Bose; Indira Roy; Kalyan Chatterjee; Joysree Roy; Shefali
- Music by: Satyajit Ray
- Release date: 27 October 1970
- Running time: 110 minutes
- Language: Bengali

Pratidwandi (English: The Adversary, Siddharta and the City) is a 1970 Indian Bengali drama film written and directed by Satyajit Ray based on the novel by Sunil Gangopadhyay. It is the first part of the Calcutta trilogy. Pratidwandi tells the story of Siddharta, an educated middle-class man caught up in the turmoil of social unrest. Corruption and unemployment are rampant, and Siddhartha cannot align himself with either his revolutionary activist brother or his career-oriented sister. The film is known for experimenting with techniques such as photo-negative flashbacks.

== Plot ==
Siddhartha (Dhritiman Chatterjee) is forced to discontinue his medical studies due to the unexpected death of his father. He has to now find a job instead. In one job interview, he is asked to name the most significant world event in the last ten years. His reply is 'the plain human courage shown by the people of Vietnam', instead of the expected: man landing on the Moon. The interviewer asks if he is a communist. Needless to say, he does not get the job.

He reaches a coffee shop where he is offered work for the communist party. When he does not show any interest, the party leader tells him about an opening for a medical representative. To escape from the heat and have a snooze, he goes into a cinema. As a government propaganda newsreel is being shown before the feature, a bomb explodes in the cinema hall. In the stampede that follows, Siddartha breaks his watch. He goes to a watchmaker but he cannot afford the repairs.

Waiting to cross the road, he notices a beautiful woman. He drifts back to his days as a medical student in a flashback. The professor is explaining the anatomy of the female breast. Many flashbacks and dreams occur to Siddartha throughout the film.

On his way to the hostel, he has an encounter with some hippies. Along with an ex-classmate, he goes out to see an uncensored Swedish film but, to their disappointment, the film turns out to be boring.

Amid constant wandering in Calcutta, disintegrating relationships with his sister and a communist brother, his friendship with Keya is a source of stability.

Keya is a simple girl. Siddharta and Keya enjoy each other's company but they cannot make any commitment to each other due to the circumstances.

After yet another attempt at a job interview, Siddhartha leaves the big city to take a modest job as a salesman in a far-off small town. He writes to Keya that he still cherishes their relationship. He also hears the call of a bird that he remembers from his childhood in his dreams but this time it is for real, and not in his mind. After completing the letter, he comes out to the balcony of his modest room. The bird calls again. He also hears the sombre chants of a funeral procession. As he turns to the camera, the picture is frozen.

The ending is reminiscent of the first scene which shows the death of Siddhartha's father. However, the last scene is symbolic of the end of Siddhartha's aspirations of finding a job in Calcutta.

== Cast ==
- Dhritiman Chatterjee as Siddhartha
- Jayashree Roy as Keya
- Krishna Bose as Sutapa
- Indira Roy
- Kalyan Chatterjee
- Debraj Roy
- Sefali
- Biplab Chatterjee

== Reception and awards ==
Vincent Canby of The New York Times gave it 4.5 stars out of 5, calling it a "particularly moving comedy" in which the protagonist "seethes with rage about social injustices, about economic corruption, but he is powerless to express it." Dennis Schwartz, grading the film an A−, calls it a "beautifully observed political film of disenfranchisement." "Satyajit Ray", he writes, "gives his nod of approval to world-wide counter-culture revolution, the revolt of youth against the stagnant older generation, and the social upheaval taking place in his beloved Calcutta. But he also points out that India is a different animal than the Western countries in upheaval. He says it's because India has a different temperament after being oppressed so long by being colonized by the British and therefore the youth has to re-establish their own true identities before they can change things for the better... The message seemed accessible", he concludes, "but, perhaps, what was most inaccessible in this political drama, was Ray's wickedly droll sense of humor (like those timely placed X-rays to let us see the stark truth of reality)." James Travers gave the film a perfect score, noting "a significant stylistic shift from Ray's previous films, so much so that it may have shocked and surprised contemporary audiences who had grown accustomed to his poetic flavour of neo-realism during the previous decade." He comments that the film's cinéma vérité style "suits its subject perfectly" and calls it an "[un]comfortable film to watch" due to its "austerity and bleakness that distance the spectator from the subject and, unusually for Ray, its harshness is not softened by poetic irony."

Writing for Sight & Sound, Tom Milne, considered that "[t]oo much [...] ha[d] been made of the increasingly direct political involvement in [...] The Adversary", finding parallels with his previous films such as Mahanagar, Kanchenjungha and Jalsaghar. Derek Malcolm wrote that the film's "lyrical flashback technique [...] does not always work out too well" despite having some "superb passages" and "that elusive quality of looking as deeply under the surface of things as almost anyone" in his writing and direction. He also defended the film from its detractors.

The film holds a Rotten Tomatoes rating of 100% based on 6 reviews, with an average score of 7.5/10.

The film won three Indian National Film Awards, including the National Film Award for Best Direction in 1971 and a nomination for the Gold Hugo Award, at the Chicago International Film Festival, 1971.

== Legacy ==
Pratidwandi is the first film of Ray's "Calcutta Trilogy", which continued with Seemabaddha (1971) and Jana Aranya (1976). In 2012, filmmaker Ashim Ahluwalia included the film in his personal top ten (for the "Sight & Sound Greatest Films of All Time 2012" poll), writing: "Pratidwandi sees Ray drop his early style for a gritty hand-held Godardian romp through ’70s Calcutta. Incredible."

== See also ==
- Cinema of West Bengal
- Cinema of India
- Parallel cinema
