= Teen Kanya =

1961 Indian-Bengali anthology film directed by Satyajit Ray

- Film poster
- Directed by: Satyajit Ray
- Written by: Satyajit Ray (screenplay); Rabindranath Tagore (stories)
- Produced by: Satyajit Ray
- Starring: Soumitra Chatterjee; Aparna Sen
- Distributed by: Sony Pictures
- Release date: 5 May 1961
- Running time: 173 min.
- Country: India
- Language: Bengali

Teen Kanya (English: Three Girls) is a 1961 Indian Bengali-language anthology film directed by Satyajit Ray, and based upon short stories by Rabindranath Tagore. The film's original Indian release contained three stories. The international release of the film contained two stories, missing the second ("Monihara: The Lost Jewels"). This version was released on VHS in 1997 under the title Two Daughters. The Academy Film Archive preserved the international version of Teen Kanya in 1996.

== Plot ==
=== The Postmaster ===
The Postmaster Nandalal (Anil Chatterjee), a young man, arrives from Calcutta as the postmaster of a small village. Ratan (Chandana Banerjee), a pre-adolescent orphan girl, is his housekeeper/maid. Though only a child herself, she cooks, cleans and cares for Nandalal.

Nandalal, a city bred young man, is like a fish out of water in the village. He is bored. On an impulse and probably to kill time, he begins teaching her to read and write. She responds eagerly. A tender bond develops. Ratan is devoted and waits on him. For Nandalal, however, she is just a pastime.

When Nandalal contracts malaria, Ratan nurses him back to health. But he has had enough of the rural life and resigns. Ratan is heartbroken. He prepares to leave without realizing how attached to him Ratan has become.

Ratan is hurt when Nandalal offers her some money as a tip for her services. She passes Nandalal carrying a pail of water. She has been crying, but is too proud to accept the tip. A few moments her voice is heard informing the new postmaster that she has brought water for him.

Nandalal is overwhelmed by emotions as he stares at the money in his hand. Putting the money back in pocket, he walks away.

=== Monihara (The Lost Jewels) ===
Near an abandoned mansion, the village schoolteacher (Gobinda Chakravarti) recounts a story to a hooded man.

It seems that the house was inhabited by a man Phanibhusan (Kali Banerjee) and his wife Manimalika (Kanika Majumdar).

The wife is obsessed with jewels and ornaments. She accumulates jewels by nagging her husband. Though they have been married for a long time, she is very cold to him. The husband keeps buying jewels for her in hope of gaining her love.

She has a phobia that one day he may ask for the jewels back. A fire destroys his business. To confirm her fear, she offers to sell her jewels. But when he shows some interest in the idea, she retreats in panic.

When the husband is away to raise money, she calls her cousin to escort her to her parents' house. The cousin, though, has other plans for the jewels. The wife leaves for the last time as they leave the house with all the jewels.

The husband is puzzled at the missing wife and jewels. He is haunted by what seems to be her ghost. After a series of such incidents, he finds himself facing the ghost of his wife, a black silhouetted figure. The black figure claims to be his wife. Afraid, he reaches for a jewel box that he had brought for her on his last trip. The black figure, still wearing gold bangles, charges to grab the jewel box with a horrible laugh.

After listening to the tale, the hooded man says that he has enjoyed the story, but it has many errors. He reveals that he is the husband in the story and disappears.

The Academy Film Archive preserved Monihara in 1998.

=== Samapti (The Conclusion) ===
Amulya (Soumitra Chatterjee) is returning to his village after passing his exams in Calcutta to spend some time with his widowed mother. After getting down from the boat, as he struggles in the muddy path, he senses that someone is following him. Soon he finds out it is a tomboyish teenager Mrinmoyee (Aparna). She bursts into giggles at his plight and runs away.

The mother has arranged for him to marry the daughter of a respectable family. Much against his wishes, he goes to visit the girl in a nearby village, carrying an umbrella and wearing shining shoes. The girl is very conventional and he is forced to admire her needlework, singing, and her other skills.

Suddenly, Mrinmoyee, known as Paglee ("Madcap"), charges in following her pet squirrel. Then he finds his shoes gone. As he sets out to walk back to his village, he finds one of his missing shoes in the mud path. Amulya captures the culprit, Mrinmoyee. It is now her turn to fall in the slushy mud. Amulya is amused and probably also in love.

Against his mother's wishes, he marries Mrinmoyee. On their first night together, she escapes by climbing down a tree and spends the night on her favorite swing on the riverbank. It is a scandal. She is locked in her room and in a childish tantrum, throws things at Amulya. He returns to Calcutta and she is sent back to her mother's house. Once he is gone, she realises how much she really loves him.

His mother makes Amulya come back on the false pretext of her illness. Amulya goes in search of Mrinmoyee in the rain. Unable to find her, he returns, only to find her in his room. He asks her how she managed to sneak in. She replies, "By climbing the tree, but I'll not do it again". She is no longer a childish madcap, but a grown woman in love.

== Cast ==
=== The Postmaster ===
- Chandana Banerjee as Ratan
- Nripati Chattopadhyay as Bishey
- Anil Chatterjee as Nandal
- Khagen Pathak as Khagen
- Gopal Roy as Bilash

=== Monihara (The Lost Jewel) ===
- Kali Banerjee as Phanibhushan
- Kanika Majumdar as Manimalika
- Kumar Roy as Madhusudhan
- Gobinda Chakravarti as Schoolmaster and narrator

=== Samapti (The Conclusion) ===
- Soumitra Chatterjee as Amulya
- Aparna Sen as Mrinmoyee
- Sita Mukherjee as Jogmaya
- Gita Dey as Nistarini
- Santosh Dutta as Kishori
- Mihir Chakravarti as Rakhal
- Devi Neogy as Haripada

== Reception ==
=== Critical reception ===
On the review aggregator website Rotten Tomatoes, 100% of 9 critics' reviews are positive for Two Daughters, with an average rating of 7.9/10.

=== Accolades ===
National Film Awards

- 1961: National Film Award for Best Feature Film in Bengali

Berlin International Film Festival

- 13th Berlin International Film Festival: Selznick Golden Laurel for Best Film

Bengal Film Journalists' Association Awards

- 25th Annual BFJA Awards: Best Director & Best Indian Film of the year.
