= Sa Re Ga Ma Pa Ek Main Aur Ek Tu =

- Created by: Zee TV, Rajeev Arora, Dr. Abhishek Dwivedi, Thought Vendors
- Directed by: Gajendra Singh
- Starring: Shaan
- Opening theme: "Sa Re Ga Ma Pa Ek Main Aur Ek Tu"
- Country of origin: India

Production
- Running time: approx. 52 minutes

Original release
- Network: Zee TV
- Release: March 2006 – 24 June 2006

Related
- Sa Re Ga Ma Pa Challenge 2005; Sa Re Ga Ma Pa L'il Champs

Sa Re Ga Ma Pa Ek Main Aur Ek Tu is a duet singing competition and was the 2nd public voting singing competition in the Sa Re Ga Ma Pa series on Zee TV.

It featured some new contestants and some old contestants from Sa Re Ga Ma Pa Challenge 2005 that were paired up in duets. The winners of the show were Ujjaini Mukherjee and Aishwarya Nigam, and the runners up were Sharib and Bonjyotsna.

Like all the other shows in the Sa Re Ga Ma Pa series, Ek Main Aur Ek Tu was hosted by Shaan. The judges for the show were Lesle Lewis and Hariharan. The Grand Finale was held at the Airport Expo in Dubai, U.A.E

== Contestants ==
There were 18 final contestants that were paired up into 9 duets:

- Vineeta Punn & Niladri Debnath
- Raktima Mukherjee & Vishwanath Batunge
- Joyeeta Sen & Saptak Bhattacharjee
- Sinchan Dixit & Mohammed Irfan
- Prajakta Ranade & Hrishikesh Ranade
- Twinkle Bajpai & Vishwas Rai
- Sanchali Chatterjee & Rajeev Chamba
- Banjyotsna Borgohain & Sharib Sabri (runners-up)
- Ujjaini Mukherjee & Aishwarya Nigam (winners)

== Cast ==
- Shaan – Co-host (left towards the end of the show)
- Ishita Arun – Co-host
- Rohit Roy – Co-host (towards the end of the show)
- Hariharan – Judge
- Lesle Lewis – Judge
