= Ujjaini Mukherjee =

Indian singer

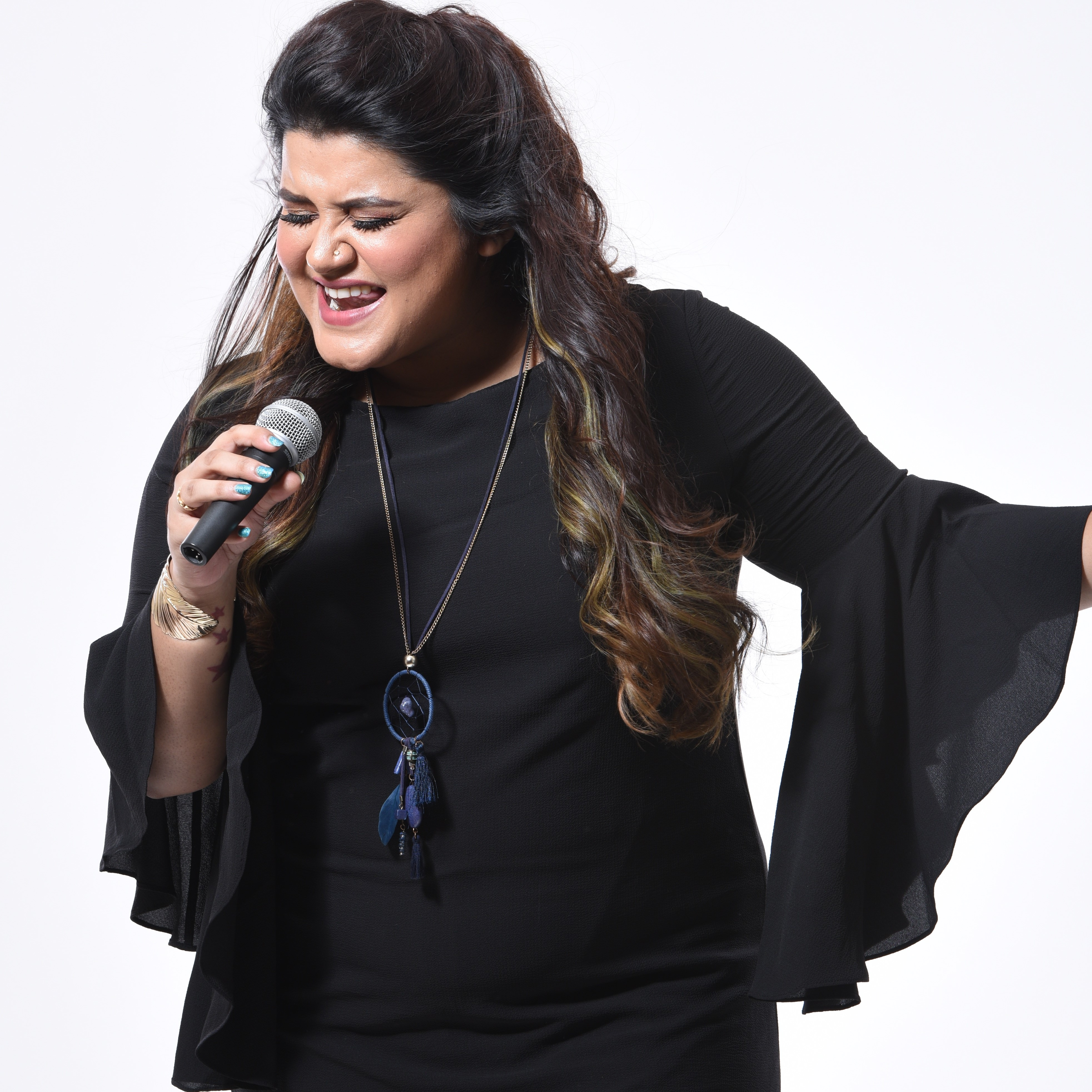

Background information
- Born: Ujjaini Mukherjee
- Genre: Filmi Pop Soft rock Hindustani classical music Jazz Rabindra Sangeet
- Occupations: Singer, performer
- Instruments: Vocals
- Years active: 2005–present

Ujjaini Mukherjee is an Indian singer.

== Early years ==
Her first recording was for the composer Debojyoti Mishra.

At the age of 16 she participated in the Sa Re Ga Ma Pa Challenge in 2005 and finished in the final top 10.

Ujjaini then won Sa Re Ga Ma Pa Ek Main Aur Ek Tu, along with Aishwarya Nigam.

== Independent Singles ==
Some of Ujjaini's own singles available on YouTube are "Aay Srabon" in 2013, "Saajan Gaye Pardes" in 2014, and "Nishi Raat Baanka Chand" in 2016.

== Awards and nominations ==
She was nominated for the Mirchi Music Awards in the 'Upcoming Female singer' Category for the song "Mannu Bhaiyya Ka Karihen" from the film Tanu Weds Manu.

She was also nominated for Filmfare Awards East for "Ami Akash khola" from the film Aborto (2014) and was the winner of the "Kalakar Awards 2015" as the "Best Female Performer".

Nominated for "Best Female Vocalist of the Year – Films" for her song "Dil Rasiya" from Byomkesh Pawrbo in the 2017 edition of Mirchi Music Awards Bangla

Nominated at the Mirchi Music Awards for Upcoming Female Vocalist of The Year in 2011 for her song "Mannu Bhaiyya" from Tanu Weds Manu

Nominated as best female playback singer at the first Filmfare Awards East for Aborto

At the 2018 Mirchi Music Awards Bangla, Ujjaini's 2017 album "Muhurto" (Moments) garnered nominations for Song of the Year, Music Composer of the Year, Lyricist of the Year in the "Adhunik" (Modern) categories. In addition, Ujjaini's film song from Ebong Kiriti earned her a nomination for the best Female Vocalist of the Year.

== Achievements ==
She was a finalist on Sa Re Ga Ma Pa Challenge 2005 achieving 7th place and within the span of a few months in 2006, she was the grand finale winner of Sa Re Ga Ma Pa Ek Main Aur Ek Tu with Aishwarya.

Ujjaini also participated in some other popular reality shows as well, like Indian Idol (2004), Jo Jeeta Wohi Super Star (2008), Music ka Maha Muqqabla (2010).

Winner of the "Kalakar Awards 2015" as "Best Female Performer" and also, the "Kolkata Ratna" Award, The Bengal Youth Icon award as the best performer

== Discography ==
=== Film Songs ===
Following are the list of songs that Ujjaini Mukherjee has sung for various Indian Movies

Year	Film	Song(s)	Co-singer(s)	Composer(s)	Notes
2024	Pushpa 2: The Rule	Kissik		Devi Sri Prasad	
2024	Stree 2	Aaj Ei Raat	Ishan Mitra	Sachin-Jigar	
2022	Tirandaj Shabor	Lag Lag		Bickram Ghosh	
2021	Antardhaan	Raja Rani		Ratul Shankar	
2021	Abar Kanchanjungha	Paharer Gaan		Ashu Chakraborty	
2021	Avijatrik	Hari Haraye Namah		Bickram Ghosh (Music Producer)	
2021	Golondaaj	Raasher Gaan	Shovan	Bickram Ghosh	
2020	Brahma Janen Gopon Kommoti	Yadidang Whridayang		Anindya Chatterjee	
2020	Hullor	O Babaji	Kinjal Chatterjee	Dolaan Mainaak	
2019	Asur (film)	Mon Janona	Shovan	Bickram Ghosh	
2018	Byomkesh Gotro	Bisher Dhowaye		Bickram Ghosh	
2018	Khajoor Pe Atke	Duniya	Divya Kumar	Bickram Ghosh	
2018	Khajoor Pe Atke	Aao Na Dekha	Timir Biswas	Bickram Ghosh	
2018	Flat No 609	Icche Gulo	Anupam Roy	Ratul Shankar	
2018	Uma	Esho Bondhu	Somlata Acharyya Chowdhury	Anupam Roy	
2018	Honeymoon (2018 film)	Naina Tore		Savvy Gupta	
2018	Boxer	Nesha Nesha	Samidh Mukerjee, Suyasha Sengupta	Samidh Mukerjee	
2018	Boxer	Rock & Roll	Samidh Mukerjee	Samidh Mukerjee	
2017	Thammar Boyfriend	Title Track	Kinjal Chattopadhyay	Dolaan Mainaak	
2017	Kuheli	Aamar Shohor Kolkata		Dolaan Mainaak	
2017	Haripada Haribol	Jiya Laage Na		Deep-Loy	
2017	Ebong Kiriti	Hoyto Tumi Dekhecho		Pijush Chakraborty	
2016	Byomkesh Pawrbo	Dil Rasiya Re		Bickram Ghosh	
2016	Eagoler Chokh	Dil Mehfil		Bickram Ghosh	
2016	Sesh Sangbad	Haarbo Naa		Amit Sur	
2016	Khawto	Kichu To Chaichi Na	Kinjal Chattopadhyay	Anupam Roy	
2016	Shororipu	Aaj Raate Shob Bhule	Sourav Sarkar	Dev Sen	
2016	Chorabali	Title Track		Dibyendu Mukherjee	
2015	Cross Connection 2	Lilabali		Neel Dutt	
2015	Cross Connection 2	Mombaati Raat	Rupankar Bagchi	Neel Dutt	
2015	Chitra	Khunshuti	Timir Biswas, Dodo	Mohul Chakraborty	
2015	Ebar Shabor	Adho Ghum		Bickram Ghosh	
2015	Fakebook	Boka Dil		Dolaan Mainaak	
2014	Highway	Khela Shesh	Arijit Singh (Male Version)	Anupam Roy	
2014	Taan	Nona Paani		Indraadip Dasgupta	
2014	Teen Patti	Raat Erokom		Indraadip Dasgupta	
2013	Aborto	Ami Akash Khola		Bickram Ghosh	
2013	Aborto	Mon Uthlo Dekh	Nirmalya Roy	Bickram Ghosh	
2013	Ganesh Talkies	Jhaal Legeche	Rupankar Bagchi	Neel Dutt	
2013	Kidnapper	Hridoyer Kautha	Saptak Bhattacharjee	Raja Narayan Deb	
2013	Nayika Sangbad	Tor Sorire Rupoli Ronger°		Gabu Gourab Chatterjee	
2013	Mistake (film)	Nai Re Nai Re Chinta Kono		Indraadip Dasgupta	
2012	Bhalobasa Off Route E	Aai Brishti Jhhepe		Arunava Khasnobis	
2012	Bhalobasa Off Route E	Chain Mohe Aaye Na	Rupankar Bagchi	Arunava Khasnobis	
2012	Bhalobasa Off Route E	Toke Bhalobeshe	Ravi Shukla	Arunava Khasnobis	
2011	Tanu Weds Manu	Mannu Bhaiyya	Sunidhi Chauhan, Niladri	Krsna Solo	
2011	Tanu Weds Manu	Yun Hi	Mohit Chauhan	Krsna Solo	
2010	Right Yaaa Wrong	Kya Ghalat Kya Sahi		Monty Sharma	
2010	Josh	Evvariki	Rahul Vaidya	Sandeep Chowta	
2010	Byomkesh Bakshi	Mayabi Raate		Neel Dutt	
2009	Madly Bangalee	Phirey Asche		Neel Dutt	
2009	Cross Connection	Mukhosher Opashe		Neel Dutt	
2008	Chalo Let's Go	Ei Poth Jodi Na	Anjan Dutta, Srikanto Acharya	Neel Dutt	
2008	Chalo Let's Go	Chupi Chupi Raat	Rupankar Bagchi	Neel Dutt	
2008	Chalo Let's Go	Chalo Let's Go	Rupam Islam, Srikanta Acharya	Neel Dutt	
2008	Bhole Shankar	Jab Jab Aave Yaad Tohar	Manoj Tiwari	Dhananjay Mishra	
2008	BhoomiPutra	Bina Soche Samjhe	Udit Narayan	Dhananjay Mishra	
2008	BhoomiPutra	Mann Bhave Sahariya Laiki	Manoj Mishra	Dhananjay Mishra	
2006	Alag	The Soul Of Alag	Vedala Hemachandra	Aadesh Shrivastava	
2006	Alag	Saanjh Ki Pighalti	Anand Sharma, Krishna Beura	Aadesh Shrivastava	

=== Non-film Songs ===
Out of all the songs that Ujjaini has sung, a special mention goes to "Devotee" , the track from the album "Maya (A Tribute To Ravi Shankar)" an internationally acclaimed album by the legendary Bickram Ghosh. Another mention goes for the Durga Puja special album "Bondhu... Thakish Pashe" in 2016 which was initiated by Geet Entertainment by bringing together Ujjaini and Rupankar Bagchi, the best names in Bengali music to recreate the magic of the old times in a new age as the songs of the album had a beautiful melodious feel of the old times to them and also, it was another attempt to relive the time without digital piracy and promote original music by releasing it only on physically available CDs. In 2017, Ujjaini collaborated with Ashu Abhishek , the new age composer duo for her Durga Puja special album "Muhurto" and it had a fully digital release under the label of Asha Audio. Ujjaini has sung numerous Non Film songs including title tracks for TV serials, a few of them have been assembled below :-

Year	Song(s)	Album	Co-singer(s)/Lyrics	Composer(s)	Notes
2022	Ekar Gohone	Web Series (Rudrabinar Obhishaap Season 2)		Joy Sarkar	
2022	Jab Barse Sona	Digital Release	Rupankar Bagchi Manomoy Bhattacharya		
2021	Du Chokhe Harai	Web Series (Gangulys Wed Guhas)		Sravan Bhattacharya	
2021	It Will Be Fine	Digital Single		Ujjaini Mukherjee (Composition & Lyrics)	Shamik Guha Roy (Music Producer)
2021	Moharaja (A Tribute To Satyajit Ray)	Digital Single		Ujjaini Mukherjee (Composition)	Samik Roy Choudhury (Lyrics) Shamik Guha Roy (Music Producer)
2021	Premer Holi	Digital Single		Ujjaini Mukherjee (Composition)	Samik Roy Choudhury (Rap & Rap Lyrics) Suman Mickey Chatterjee (Lyrics) Shamik Guha Roy (Music Producer)
2021	Bodle Jachche Mukh	Web Series Shei Je Holud Pakhi (Season 2)		Upali Chattopdhyay	
2020	Aamar Haat Bandhibi Paa Bandhibhi	Prothoma Kadambini		Upali Chattopdhyay	
2020	Aaj E Jhorer Raate	Digital Single		Rabindranath Tagore	John Paul (Arranger)
2020	Bissanno Golap	Digital Single	Rupankar Bagchi		
2020	Dustu Corona	Digital Single	Mir Afsar Ali	Ashu (Arranger)	
2020	Durga Chalisa	Digital Single	Rudraneel Choudhary (Arranger) Swagato Banerjee (Guitar)	Ujjaini Mukherjee	
2020	Japoner Gaan	Digital Single	Debarshi Sarkar (Lyrics)	Nilanjan Ghosh	
2019	Pakhider Gaan	Digital Single	Meenakshi Mukherjee (Backing Vocals)	Nilanjan Ghosh Rahul Sarkar	
2019	Jal Mein Kumbha	Digital Single			
2019	Montu Pilot	Montu Pilot Hoichoi Originals	Saurav Das	Kuntal De	
2019	Phowara	Digital Single	Mir Afsar Ali	Ashu Chakraborty	
2019	Mera Desh	Digital Single	Dipayan Madhuraa	Upali Chattopadhyay	
2019	Chander Hashi	Hello 2 Hoichoi Originals		Upali Chattopadhyay	
2019	Bodhu Kon Aalo	Hello 2 Hoichoi Originals		Upali Chattopadhyay	
2019	Sun Bangla Theme Song		Rupankar Bagchi	Debojyoti Mishra	
2019	Saanson Ko Jeena Sikhaye	Tagore For Today (YouTube Release)			
2019	Amaro Porano Jaha Chay	Tagore For Today (YouTube Release)			
2019	BC Jain Jewellers TVC			Ashu	
2018	PC Chandra Jewellers Rihi Collection			Ashu	
2018	Okaron	Pheromon		Bickram Ghosh	
2018	Piya Ogo	Pheromon		Bickram Ghosh	
2018	Akibuki	Digital Single	Shayok Banerjee	Shayok Banerjee	
2018	Bhoomikanya	Bhoomikanya Star Jalsha		Bickram Ghosh	
2018	Golpo Aamar Phurolo	Shei Je Holud Pakhi Web Series		Upali Chattopadhyay	Hoichoi
2018	Mrityur Por	Shei Je Holud Pakhi Web Series		Upali Chattopadhyay	Hoichoi
2018	Shesh Eshe Geche	Shei Je Holud Pakhi Web Series		Upali Chattopadhyay	Hoichoi
2018	Holi Aayo Re	Shei Je Holud Pakhi Web Series		Upali Chattopadhyay	Hoichoi
2018	Aaj Tobe Khoma Koro	Shei Je Holud Pakhi Web Series		Upali Chattopadhyay	Hoichoi
2017	Muhurto Title Track	Muhurto		Ashu Abhishek	YouTube Release
2017	Ekoosh	Muhurto		Ashu Abhishek	YouTube Release
2017	Phowara	Muhurto		Ashu Abhishek	YouTube Release
2017	Aabcha Shohore	Aamra		Soumya Bose	YouTube Release
2017	Mono Mor Meghro	Rendezvous With Tagore		Rabindranath Tagore	YouTube Release
2017	Guti Malharer Atithi Title Track	Guti Malharer Atithi	Durnibar Saha	Ashu Abhishek	Zee Bangla Cinema Originals
2017	Du Jon Bache Pashapashi	Love Letter	Timir Biswas	Ashu Abhishek	Zee Bangla Cinema Originals
2017	Tobu Mone Rekho			Upali Chattopadhyay	Zee Bangla
2017	Bokul Katha			Suvam Maitra	Zee Bangla
2016	Kaalo Raat	Kader Kuler Bou		Ashu Abhishek	Zee Bangla Cinema Originals
2016	Nishi Raat Banka Chand	A Tribute To Geeta Dutt			YouTube Release
2016	Laaguk Na Brishtir Chhant	Bandhu Thakish Pashe		Biswaroop Ghosh Dastidar	Digital CD Release
2016	Kichu Katha Baaki	Bandhu Thakish Pashe	Rupankar Bagchi	Biswaroop Ghosh Dastidar	Digital CD Release
2016	Hoyto Ekhono Tumi Shei	Bandhu Thakish Pashe		Biswaroop Ghosh Dastidar	Digital CD Release
2016	Chhilo Shei Ojana	Bandhu Thakish Pashe		Biswaroop Ghosh Dastidar	Digital CD Release
2016	Takiyo Na Aar	Bandhu Thakish Pashe	Rupankar Bagchi	Biswaroop Ghosh Dastidar	Digital CD Release
2016	Alash Dupur	Bandhu Thakish Pashe		Biswaroop Ghosh Dastidar	Digital CD Release
2016	Aami Shudhu Khunjechi Tomaye	Professional			Zee Bangla Cinema Originals
2016	Tomar Jonyo	Paan Supari		Deb Chowdhury	Zee Bangla Cinema Originals
2016	Jodi Tor Daak Shune	Abar Ekla Cholo			Zee Bangla Cinema Originals
2016	Bhalobashi Bhalobashi	Akash Chowa			Zee Bangla Cinema Originals
2016	Bigg Boss	Bigg Boss Bangla Season 2	Jeet (actor)	Ashu Abhishek	Colors Bangla
2015	Sagor Eka	Prem			
2015	Aaj Aari Kaal Bhab	Aaj Aari Kaal Bhab		Dabbu Ghoshal	Star Jalsha Megaserial
2014	Saajan Gaye Pardes	Independent Single		Ujjaini Mukherjee	YouTube Release
2013	Aay Srabon	Independent Single		Ujjaini Mukherjee	YouTube Release
2013	Tomay Amay Mile	Star Jalsha Series	Arijit Singh		
2013	Aaye Sokhi, Aamra Bachi	Sokhi	Upali Chattopadhyay	Upali Chattopadhyay	Star Jalsha Megaserial
2013	Mouchaak	Mouchaak		Indraadip Dasgupta	Star Jalsha Megaserial
2007	Dhara Dey Na	Aay Mon Tui Aay			
2007	Title Track	Aay Mon Tui Aay			
2007	Dheere Dheere	Aay Mon Tui Aay			
2007	Eki Akash	Aay Mon Tui Aay			
2007	Title Track	Ek Main Aur Ek Tu (Aishwarya And Ujjaini)	Aishwarya Nigam		
2007	Ishq Ho Gaya	Ek Main Aur Ek Tu (Aishwarya And Ujjaini)	Aishwarya Nigam		
2007	Jaagu Main Sari Raina	Ek Main Aur Ek Tu (Aishwarya And Ujjaini)	Aishwarya Nigam		
2007	Naina Nashile	Ek Main Aur Ek Tu (Aishwarya And Ujjaini)	Aishwarya Nigam		

== Television ==
Before becoming one of the leading names in playback singing in the film industry, Ujjaini proved her mettle in singing on national television through below mentioned reality shows :-

Year	Show	Channel	Awards
2005	Sa Re Ga Ma Pa Challenge 2005	Zee TV	7th Position
2006	Sa Re Ga Ma Pa Ek Main Aur Ek Tu	Zee TV	Winner
2008	Jo Jeeta Wohi Super Star	Star Plus	Champion's Team
2010	Music ka Maha Muqqabla	Star Plus	Shreya's Superstars
2016	Abbulish	Colors Bangla	Episode Winner
2016	Happy Parents Day	Zee Bangla	Episode Winner
2018	Dadagiri Unlimited	Zee Bangla	Episode Winner

She is also a regular celebrity guest performer on TV shows like Didi no 1 and Rannaghar amongst many others.
