= Asur (film) =

2020 Indian Bengali-language film by Pavel Bhattacharjee

- Theatrical release poster
- Directed by: Pavel Bhattacharjee
- Written by: Pavel Bhattacharjee
- Screenplay by: Pavel Bhattacharjee
- Produced by: Jeet; Gopal Madnani; Amit Jumrani
- Starring: Jeet; Abir Chatterjee; Nusrat Jahan
- Cinematography: Supriyo Dutta; Joydeep Bose
- Edited by: Moloy Laha
- Music by: Bikram Ghosh; Amit Mitra
- Production company: Jeetz Filmworks
- Distributed by: Jeetz Filmworks
- Release date: 3 January 2020
- Country: India
- Language: Bengali

Asur (/əsuːr/; lit. 'Devil') is a 2020 Indian Bengali-language romantic drama thriller film written and directed by Pavel. According to the director, it is a tribute to the sculptor Ramkinkar Baij, but the storyline is inspired from the 2015 Deshopriyo Park Durga Pujo, which houses the world's tallest Durga murti. Produced by Jeet, Gopal Madnani and Amit Jumrani under the banner of Jeetz Filmworks, it stars Jeet in the titular role, alongside Abir Chatterjee and Nusrat Jahan in lead roles. The action sequences are designed by Sunil Rodrigues and Md. Amin Khatib. Originally set to release in December 2019, the film was released on 3 January 2020.

== Plot ==
Kigan Mandi is a profoundly passionate artist who easily forgets his surroundings whilst immersed in his own vivid thoughts. An eccentric, Kigan's behaviour frequently results in being suspended from his job as a professor of art at Visva-Bharati University. When his photo shoot featuring a female student causes a scandal, the university fires him. Newly unburdened by the dryly dispassionate orderliness of university rules and regulations, the Kigan is delighted by finally having the freedom to exert full creative control as he pursues his artistic passions.

Kigan begins experiencing visualisations of Goddess Devi Durga in the form of a young girl who always accompanies him in his works. As an expression of his bhakti, Kigan plans his grandest project yet: he wants to create the world's largest Durga murti. Enlisting the help of the well-connected Aditi - his friend ever since they met as young classmates during their own undergraduate arts studies - Kigan overcomes numerous hurdles and eventually succeeds when Aditi's influential father gets the project approved. Kigan's monumental murti of Goddess Durga is installed to much fanfare and the consecration ceremony proves highly popular with the public.

With the pujas continually attracting increasingly large crowds of devotees, there is also no shortage of corporate sponsors eager for publicity. Aditi's husband, Bodhi, runs one of these major corporations seeking to secure a prominent role as one of the official sponsors of the puja. Bodhi's personal struggles with inferiority make him add a condition to his sponsorship agreement with the puja committee: he wants Kigan's name removed from all subsequent mentions of the Durga murti. Aditi's father admonishes his son-in-law's pettiness and refuses the agreement entirely.

The new company makes terrific marketing of the puja through ads and banners. Meanwhile, Bodhi is very depressed as Kigan's creation becomes very popular and beats any other puja pandal in terms of crowd. Bodhi plans to demolish Deshbandhu park's puja and take revenge against Kigan.

One morning Bodhi reaches the site and meets Kigan. Bodhi appreciates Kigan's work but tells him that the idol would not be open anymore as it would be destroyed by Bodhi. Kigan thinks that Bodhi is just joking and tells him that if he can destroy it then he can proceed but the idol will remain as long as Kigan is alive. Bodhi just smiles and leaves.

Meanwhile, the puja committee organises a party where Aditi's father introduces Kigan to other guests as Aditi's future husband. Aditi also agrees but Kigan makes a scene by mocking Aditi's father there. He tells he only loves Aditi as a friend and doesn't want to marry her as, according to Kigan, Bodhi is the perfect husband for her already. Aditi's father feels embarrassed and suffers a cerebral attack after which he becomes paralysed. Now Aditi turns against Kigan and thinks that Kigan is responsible for her father's condition.

Meanwhile, Kigan's pandal attracts crowds. Bodhi makes plans to create fake bomb blasts in the puja park and create a mess. According to his plans a terrible mess occurs at the pandal, and several people are injured in the stampede. Bodhi even pays the media to cover this incident exclusively and promote it more seriously than the actual incident, eventually the police authorities ban the puja and order for the dismantling of the idol after puja.

Kigan is put in jail for quarrelling with police. Later Bodhi releases Kigan from jail and explains that he took his revenge by getting the puja banned from public. Kigan requests Bodhi to open the puja after 2–3 days but Bodhi declines. Kigan then challenges Bodhi that he would reopen the puja till immersion. Meanwhile, Kigan owns up to his mistakes to Aditi and they reconcile. Next day Kigan investigates that only two persons were injured not many and it was a paid fake news. Kigan has meetings with police commissioner, governor regarding reopening of the puja but everywhere he gets negative response. Out of utter depression Kigan goes to Bodhi's house, determined that Bodhi is responsible for all this and he would kill Bodhi. Kigan and Bodhi have a fight where Kigan is about to kill Bodhi but then Bodhi's son attacks Kigan with a bat and Kigan falls. Bodhi scolds his son for hitting an elder person but Kigan supports him. Then Bodhi tells that he doesn't want to make his son like Kigan, so he will teach him proper manners. Here Bodhi discloses that his son is actually Kigan's and he has raised him as his own child and always has been a good father because he wants to make him a gentleman and not an irresponsible person like Kigan. Bodhi also discloses that Aditi has always loved Kigan though Bodhi has always been a good husband. Even though he has brought up Kigan's child as his own child, Aditi has never developed any feelings towards him, so he decided to finish Kigan who has destroyed his own family for that he has also destroyed his masterpiece creation. Bodhi repents that he is the Asur (villain) and begs for forgiveness from Kigan. Bodhi also discloses that he is not the only one associated with this planning but Aditi is also responsible for this. Aditi thought of taking revenge from Kigan after her father's incident so she had been involved in this case.

Kigan is completely devastated by this. He thinks that he had been responsible for all this. His work was pious but he forgot all the relationships for his art. So he leaves the place by telling that he is leaving for Nevada where he would stay undisturbed.

Meanwhile, Kigan comes to Aditi and questions her about her deeds. Aditi tells that she had done everything for Kigan more than any friend, but Kigan refused her love. So she decided to go against Kigan. But she realised that she had done everything wrong and they can start a new beginning where Kigan, Bodhi and she would live together happily. Kigan can build his idol again in the next puja. But Kigan was desolated and he says that some things cannot be built again and he belongs to the tribe of Asur where yes means yes and no means no. After that he leaves that place.

Bodhi's son finds out that in Nevada there is a particular ritual of burning of idols by the artists himself. This information strikes Bodhi and he quickly visits Deshbandhu park's puja pandal along with Aditi. But by that time Kigan has set the pandal on fire along with himself. He promises durga that their story will remain forever though the idol will be destroyed. Kigan dies but after some time heavy rain saves the pandal from burning completely and the idol is saved.

The governor, at Kigan's memorial service, announces that Kigan's work would be preserved forever and would be a landmark of dedication towards art, heritage and symbol of sacrifice for love. In the last scene it is seen that Bodhi and Aditi has been reunited and they are watching the statue which is being carried away by a helicopter through Kolkata to some other place and Bodhi's son is seen to be playing with Kigan's measuring tape and dreams to be an artist. The story questions that who is actually the Asur (villain)? As from one angle Bodhi is correct and has specific reasons for going against his dearest friend Kigan. In other angle Kigan is the villain as he had been a failure in understanding real life relationships and had always indulged himself in his arts.

== Cast ==
- Jeet as Kigan Mandi
- Abir Chatterjee as Bodhisattva aka Bodhi
- Nusrat Jahan as Aditi
- Rajnandini Paul as Durga (Kigan's Illusion)
- Biplab Chatterjee as Aditya, Aditi's father
- Kushal Chakraborty as Biva Da
- Bickram Ghosh in a special appearance
- Biswaroop Biswas as Police Commissioner
- Biswajit Chakrobarty as Governor Abhijeet Sengupta
- Gora Dhar
- Nanak Madnani
- Trambak Roy Chowdhury as Bodhi's henchman
- Raj as Shataf Bhai, Bodhi's henchman
- Ambarish Bhattacharya in a special appearance

== Soundtrack ==
The film score was composed by Bickram Ghosh while songs were composed by Bickram Ghosh & Amit Mitra with lyrics written by Sugato Guha & Dipankar Ghosh. The vocals were provided by Mohammed Irfan, Timir Biswas, Iman Chakraborty, Shovan Ganguly, and Ujjaini Mukherjee.

Track listing
No.	Title	Lyrics	Singer(s)	Length
1.	"Radha"	Sugato Guha	Iman Chakraborty, Shovan Ganguly	4:55
2.	"Mon Janona"	Sugato Guha	Ujjaini Mukherjee, Shovan Ganguly	4:25
3.	"Aagun"	Sugato Guha	Timir Biswas	5:23
4.	"Tor Hoye Jete Chai"	Sugato Guha	MD Irfan, Sayani Palit	5:10
Total length:				19:54

== Release ==
The film was released on 3 January 2020.

== Accolades ==
- Films and Frames Digital Film Awards for Best Popular Actor- Jeet (refused the award).
- West Bengal Film Journalists' Association Awards for Best Actor In A Negative Role - Abir Chatterjee
- West Bengal Film Journalists' Association Awards for Best Art Director- Ananda Addhya
- West Bengal Film Journalists' Association Awards for Best Make-up- Manjeet Tiwari
