= Bunty's Percussion =

Indian percussionist

Bunty's Percussion বান্টি'স পারকাশন

Background information
- Born: Avirup Das; 12 April 1988 (age 37)
- Origin: Kolkata, West Bengal, India
- Occupation: Percussionist
- Instruments: Percussion, Drums
- Years active: 1997–present
- Labels: Inerco, Times Music, Aatmaan Audio, Cozmik Harmony, Asha Audio, Believe Music
- Website: buntyspercussion.com

Avirup Das (born 12 April 1988), known under his stage name of Bunty's Percussion, is a Kolkata based percussionist. He is one of the founder members of renowned Bengali folk band Fakira He plays many instruments including Drums, Congas, Timbale, Djembe, Cajon, Darabuka, and Kanjira, as well as many more. He was featured as the percussionist Drummer at Zee Bangla Saregamapa for music producer Suvam Moitra in the year of 2018 -19 & 2020-21.

== Line up ==
- Fakira
- Project Maya
- Bunty's Percussion Methodize
- Sahana Bajpaie Live (Ex Percussionist)
- Nikhita Gandhi Live (Kolkata) (Ex Percussionist)
- Samantak Sinha (Ex Percussionist)
- Sourendro-Soumyojit (Ex Percussionist)

== Audio Albums ==
- Itorpona By Fakira - Inerco.
- Project Maya - Asha Audio
- Blendz ft. Anup jalota, Times Music.
- Bumerang – Dhoom Music
- Rabindranath Chhara By Ananya – Aatman Audio.
- Shikawr By Sahana Bajpaie – Cozmik Harmony
- Ja Bawlo Tai Bawlo" By Sahana Bajpaie - Inerco
- Baba Tomake By Various Artist – Aatman Audio
- Mon Bandhibi Kamnone By Sahana Bajpaie – Inerco

=== Mega Serial ===
- Nakshi Kathar Maath
- Ranu Pelo Lottery
- Aparajita Apu ( Suvam Moitra)

=== Filmography ===
Year	Film name	Music director/Directors
2013	Alik Sukh (Song MBBS)	Anindya Chatterjee
2017	Rainbow Jelly (Song Pori Pishi)	Nabarun Bose
2019	Bhoot Chaturdashi (BGM)	Nabarun Bose
2019	Buro Sadhu (BGM & Song)	Pranjal Das
2019	Aadhaar (Maati Song)	Shantanu Moitro/Rathijit
2020	Rawkto Rawhoshyo (BGM)	Nabarun Bose
2020	Tiki-Taka (BGM & Song)	Nabarun Bose
2021	Tangra Blues (BGM)	Nabarun Bose

== Theatre Live Music ==
- PS Bhalobasha (4th Bell Theatres) with Timir Biswas
