= Katti Batti =

2015 Indian film by Nikkhil Advani

- Directed by: Nikhil Advani
- Written by: Anshul Singhal; Nikhil Advani
- Produced by: Siddharth Roy Kapur
- Starring: Imran Khan; Kangana Ranaut
- Cinematography: Tushar Kanti Ray
- Edited by: Maahir Zaveri
- Music by: Songs: Shankar–Ehsaan–Loy; Background Score: Gulraj Singh
- Production companies: Emmay Entertainment; UTV Motion Pictures
- Distributed by: UTV Motion Pictures
- Release date: 18 September 2015
- Running time: 135 minutes
- Country: India
- Language: Hindi
- Budget: ₹340 million

Katti Batti (transl. Sometimes enemies, sometimes friends) is a 2015 Indian Hindi-language romantic comedy film directed, co-produced, and written by Nikhil Advani and produced by Siddharth Roy Kapur under UTV Motion Pictures and Emmay Entertainment. The film stars Imran Khan and Kangana Ranaut in the lead roles. The film marked the final film appearance of Imran Khan for over ten years, before his cameo in Happy Patel: Khatarnak Jasoos (2026).

== Plot ==
A recording on camera with a young man Madhav "Maddy" Kabra faking marriage rituals with his live-in girlfriend, Payal Ahuja, quickly cuts to Maddy being admitted into a hospital in the present day as he is shown to have likely overdosed on phenyl, which he claims he consumed by accident. When his younger sister Koyal arrives, his best friend Vinay informs her he is stable, but Koyal believes he hasn't moved on from Payal. As they briefly stop over for Maddy to collect his essential belongings from the house he and Payal lived in, the brooding Maddy reminisces about her as a flashback cuts to their first meeting in college.

At present, Maddy and Koyal argue again, upsetting their father, who leaves; his wife is shown to be deceased. Maddy, along with Vinay, is revealed to be working as an architect with a construction firm founded and headed by the eccentric Ramalingam, who introduces their new client, revealed to be Rakesh "Ricky" Ahuja. Maddy is surprised; during a presentation, Ricky tries to berate him, but he walks away. A flashback reveals their first fight in college, whence Payal revealed to Maddy that Ricky is her ex-boyfriend, who is three years senior to her and her friend Tina and had followed her to college in hopes of staying with her.

In the present, Ricky badmouths Payal, causing a flustered Maddy to lock him in the restroom; when Vinay learns of this, he is flabbergasted and blames him for overreacting. Another flashback reveals Maddy's mother to be terminally ill and confined to a wheelchair, approving of Payal after she is brought in by his friends to save face when he faints after drinking due to the couple's breakup, thanks to Ricky. Payal then reunites with Maddy and they finally start living together.

At present, Maddy attempts to contact Payal by contacting their mutual friends, all of whom refuse to help him; when he contacts her, she acts estranged on the phone, and again blocks him. Flashbacks reveal how their relationship deteriorated, leading Maddy to abandon Payal at the airport on the cusp of a trip; he realized it too late to retrieve her, but failed and has since been waiting. He later learns she will soon marry Ricky, and attempts to contact her; in the process, he comes across Roger, a convenience store owner who is a part-time musician with a band. The group helps Maddy gain access to the wedding, but their success at restraining Ricky despite their cover being blown is cut short when Payal slaps Maddy. He, Roger and the rest of the band members are arrested, with Koyal and Vinay later bailing him out.

While waiting for their return flight, Maddy realizes that Koyal is deceiving him when he discovers a handcrafted souvenir their father had gifted to Payal after their mother's death. Koyal then comes clean about Payal and reveals that she has little time to live, having been diagnosed with cancer; Ricky is, in fact, married to Tina, and the friends supported Payal's scheme to make Maddy forget her. She instigated conflict to make him loathe her. He realizes Payal is just around and proceeds to stop her, later convincing her to remain with him. They marry and spend her final days together with the friends, and the story ends with recollections of their final days.

== Cast ==
- Imran Khan as Madhav "Maddy" Kabra
- Kangana Ranaut as Payal Ahuja
- Vivan Bhatena as Rakesh "Ricky" Ahuja
- Mithila Palkar as Koyal Kabra: Maddy's sister
- Suparna Marwah as Madhav's mother
- Suhaas Ahuja as Roger
- Suneel Sinha as Mr. Kabra: Madhav's father
- Bugs Bhargava as Ramalingam: Madhav's boss
- Abhishek Saha as Vinay: Maddy's friend
- Gavin Methalaka as Yash: Maddy's Friend
- Nikkitasha Marwaha as Tina

== Soundtrack ==
Katti Batti

Soundtrack album by Shankar–Ehsaan–Loy
- Released: 27 August 2015
- Genre: Feature film soundtrack
- Length: 29:16
- Language: Hindi
- Label: Zee Music Company

Shankar–Ehsaan–Loy chronology
| Dil Dhadakne Do (2015) | Katti Batti (2015) | Katyar Kaljat Ghusali (2015) |
External audio
- Audio Jukebox on YouTube

Singles from Katti Batti
- 1. "Sarfira" Released: 12 August 2015; 2. "Sau Aansoon" Released: 21 August 2015

The soundtrack of Katti Batti was composed by Shankar–Ehsaan–Loy in their final collaboration with Advani, with the lyrics written by Kumaar in his first and, to date, only collaboration with the trio. The first song titled "Sarfira" was released on 12 August 2015. The music rights for the film were acquired by Zee Music Company. The full audio album was released on 27 August 2015.

Track listing
| No. | Title | Singer(s) | Length |
|---|---|---|---|
| 1. | "Sarfira" | Siddharth Mahadevan, Neeti Mohan, Qaran Mehta | 04:04 |
| 2. | "Sau Aasoon" | Shankar Mahadevan, Rasika Shekhar | 05:41 |
| 3. | "Lip To Lip" | Nikhil D'Souza, Ritu Pathak | 04:09 |
| 4. | "Ove Janiya" | Mohan Kannan | 06:06 |
| 5. | "Jaago Mohan Pyaare" | Siddharth Basrur, Digvijay Singh Pariyar, Raman Mahadevan, Rasika Shekhar | 04:32 |
| 6. | "Ove Jaaniye (Reprise)" | Sayani Palit | 04:48 |
| Total length: | | | 29:16 |

== Release and reception ==
The film was released on 18 September 2015 to negative reviews.

A critic from Mid-Day wrote, "There are genuine heartfelt stories and then there are stories convoluted to an extent, because the filmmaker thinks will make it work. Unfortunately, Nikhil Advani-directed Katti Batti falls into the latter category".

== Box office ==
=== India ===
The film grossed around ₹157.4 million (equivalent to ₹260 million or US$2.7 million in 2026) in its first weekend.
