= Rakhtbeej =

2012 Indian Hindi language film

- Directed by: Anil Ballani
- Starring: Maanas; Mansi Dovhal; Rajesh Khattar; Tinu Anand; Sayantani Nandi; K. Jeeva; Yateen Karyekar; Sanjay R Gagnani; Julia Dutt; Amanjot; Master Divyaansh
- Edited by: Saagar
- Music by: Ajay Jaiswal
- Release date: 25 May 2012
- Country: India
- Language: Hindi

Rakhtbeej is a Bollywood political thriller movie directed by Anil Ballani, released in 2012.

== Cast ==
The cast includes

- Mansi Dovhal
- Rajesh Khattar
- Tinu Anand
- Sayantani Nandi
- K. Jeeva
- Yatin Karyekar
- Sanjay R Gagnani
- Julia Dutt
- Amanjot
- Master Divyaansh
- Jay Shanker Pandey as Chabeela
- Rakhi Sawant as item number

== Plot ==
The movie is based on two men, Abhay and Ajay (both played by Maanas), whose fate takes them to powerful positions in business and politics. Due to a love triangle and their enmity with other powerful politicians and businessmen, their lives go for a toss.

== Soundtrack ==
Soundtrack was composed by Satish-Ajay.

No.	Title	Singer(s)	Length
1.	"Lattoo"	Mamta Sharma, Ajay Jaiswal
2.	"Itni Bhi Main"	Neha Bhasin, Ajay Jaiswal
3.	"Rakthbeej"	Vinod Rathod
4.	"Adha Gila"	Aishwarya Nigam
5.	"Naina Hue"	Nidhi Bawra

== Critical reception ==
The movie got negative feedback for both its music and content.
