= Vandita Shrivastava =

Indian actress and model

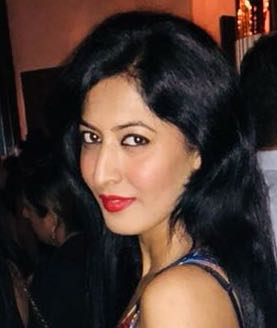
- Vandita at a launch event in 2018
- Born: Uttar Pradesh, India
- Education: MBA, LLB
- Occupations: Actress, Model
- Years active: 2011–present

Vandita Shrivastava is an Indian actress and model. She started her acting career in 2011 with Short Films, Television, Commercial Advertisements and Ramp Modelling. She switched to acting in Hindi Films in 2012 and worked in 9 Hindi Films. She stands 5 feet 7 inches (1.70 metres) tall. Her last release was Khajoor Pe Atke , in May 2018 and her upcoming film is Udd Jaa Nanhe Dil releasing on 25 September 2023.

== Education ==
Vandita did her Masters in Business Administration (MBA). She also has a Law Degree (LLB). She is a certified Web Designer.

== Early life ==
Vandita moved to several cities due to her father's postings (Army). She always actively participated in sports and art during her schooling and college days. During school, she took training for a few years in Karate and Kathak Dance. She earned a yellow belt in Karate after which she quit.

Her father is a Colonel in the Indian Army. He is from the elite Parachute Regiment. Her mother is an educationist.

== Career ==
Before venturing into showbiz, Vandita was a seasoned corporate professional in Human Resources and worked with some multinational companies.

== Filmography ==
Year	Film	Character	Production	Language
2012	Chal Pichchur Banate Hain	News Correspondent	Twilight Entertainment	Hindi
2012	Talaash	News Correspondent	Excel Entertainment	Hindi
2013	Matru Ki Bijlee Ka Mandola	Village Girl	Vishal Bharadwaj Productions	Hindi
2014	The Shaukeens	Escort	Cape of Good Films	Hindi
2015	Shamitabh	Film Reviewer	Balaji Motion Pictures	Hindi
2016	Mastizaade	Transgender Girl	Pritish Nandy Communications	Hindi
2016	Hai Apna Dil Toh Awara	Title Song cameo	Anika Films	Hindi
2018	Khajoor Pe Atke	Lead - Item Song - Sumdi Mein Jhol	Welcome Friends Productions	Hindi
2023	Udd Jaa Nanhe Dil	Releasing 25 Sept 2023	Aurous Avatar Entertainment & CFSI	Hindi

== Television ==
Year	Serial	Channel	Notes
2011	Mata Ki Chowki	Sahara One	Swastik Productions
2011	Shapath	Life OK	Fireworks Productions
2011	Tum Dena Saath Mera	Life OK	Magic Lantern
2011	CID	Sony	Fireworks Productions
