= Nihira Joshi =

Indian singer (born 1986)

Nihira Joshi-Deshpande
- Born: Nihira Joshi; 10 December 1986 (age 39)
- Origin: Mumbai, Maharashtra, India
- Genre: Filmi
- Occupations: entertainer, singer, Sa Re Ga Ma Pa Challenge 2005 finalist
- Instruments: Vocals
- Years active: 2004–present
- Spouse: Abhijit Vinod Deshpande (m. 2011)
- Website: https://www.nihiramusic.in/

Nihira Joshi (born 10 December 1986) is an Indian singer. She was a Sa Re Ga Ma Pa Challenge 2005 finalist achieving 5th place with public votes. Joshi is also a member of Ismail Darbar's "Yalgar Ho" Gharana.

== Education and career ==
Nihira Joshi is a graduate from Mithibai College, Mumbai. Her playback singing career includes the songs "Dhadak Dhadak", with Sunidhi Chauhan and Udit Narayan in the film Bunty Aur Babli, "Sabse Alag" from the film Alag, "Raat Kahegi Daastan" from the film 88 Antop Hill "Mera Dil" and "Babuji Dheere" from the film Salaam-e-Ishq: A Tribute to Love and "Tan Man" from Marigold. She has also sung the title song of the Ekta Kapoor Zee TV serial "Kasamh Se" and the Radio City theme song with playback singer Shaan.

Nihira is the only female singer in the entire album of Salaam-e-Ishq: A Tribute to Love who sings two songs. "Mera Dil" is a sugar-coated love song sung by Nihira and Shaan. The track was composed for Ayesha Takia and Akshaye Khanna in the film. Nihira also croons the re-arranged [not remixed] version of the classic "Babuji Dheere Chalna" [Aar Paar] originally sung by Geeta Dutt.

Nihira was a former winner on the Ghazal show, Aadab Arz Hai.

Nihira's voice appeared in Hindi movies, including Bunty aur Babli, Salame Ishq, Marigold, Kabhi Alvida Naa Kehna and background vocal on Alag and 88 Antop Hill.

Nihira's voice in Marathi movies, including Pailteer, Amhi Satpute and Tula Shikaveen Changla Dhada. A forthcoming Marathi project is the film Londoncha Navra.

On TV, she sang the Kasamh Se title song and background vocals for various serials on Zee TV.

== Live performance ==
She performed in musical stage shows in Singapore, India and the United States.
