= Matru Ki Bijlee Ka Mandola =

2013 Indian film by Vishal Bhardwaj

- Theatrical release poster
- Directed by: Vishal Bhardwaj
- Written by: Vishal Bhardwaj; Abhishek Chaubey
- Produced by: Vishal Bhardwaj
- Starring: Imran Khan; Anushka Sharma; Pankaj Kapur
- Cinematography: Kartik Vijay
- Edited by: A. Sreekar Prasad
- Music by: Vishal Bhardwaj
- Production companies: VB Pictures; Fox Star Studios
- Distributed by: Fox Star Studios
- Release date: 11 January 2013
- Running time: 151 minutes
- Country: India
- Language: Hindi
- Budget: ₹45 crore (US$4.7 million)
- Box office: ₹31.15 crore (US$3.3 million)

Matru Ki Bijlee Ka Mandola (transl. Matru's Bijlee's Mandola) is a 2013 Indian Hindi-language satirical black comedy film directed, co-written, co-produced, and composed by Vishal Bhardwaj. The film stars Imran Khan, Anushka Sharma, and Pankaj Kapur in the titular roles, while Shabana Azmi and Aarya Babbar play supporting roles. The film was released on 11 January 2013.

== Plot ==
The film tells the story of three individuals, Harphool Singh Mandola a.k.a. Harry, his daughter Bijlee Mandola, and Hukum Singh Matru a.k.a. 'Matru'. Harry is a wealthy, cynical businessman who dreams of turning the Mandola village into an example of his success. However, this dream can only be realized if the villagers agree to sell their land to the government at low rates so that the land can be converted into a Special Economic Zone.

Harry is a drunkard. He is normally a shrewd, sophisticated and composed individual, but whenever drunk, he turns into an advocate of equality and betterment of the villagers. When he chooses not to drink, he hallucinates, a pink buffalo 'Gulabo/Aditi Arora', the mascot of the brand of alcohol he enjoys. When Matru learns of these hallucinations, he uses them as a ploy to get Harry drunk and serve his own plans.

Bijlee Mandola is the only child of Harry Mandola. She lost her mother when she was young and now lives in Mandola village after having received a higher education in New Delhi and later in Oxford, England. Bijlee is now in love with Baadal, the son of politician Chaudhari Devi and is all set to marry him.

Chaudhari Devi is a corrupt politician who, along with her minions, is helping Harry realize his dream. Baadal and Bijlee's union is strategically apt as it serves Harry's and Chaudhari Devi's personal goals. While Chaudhari Devi conspires to control Harry's wealth by marrying her son to his daughter, Harry seeks Chaudhari Devi's help in realising his dream in exchange for their children's marriage.

Matru is a revolutionary, fighting for the villagers' cause of not letting their land being taken away. He is educated in Law from JNU, holds a job as Harry's driver and is responsible for regulating Harry's drinking. Matru's revolutionary instincts are shown to be significantly influenced by those of Mao Tse-tung.

The film starts with a negotiation at a liquor shop set in crop laden fields, between the liquor shop owner and a heavily drunk Harry. The shop owner's rude refusal to sell alcohol to Harry due to the day being a dry day provokes Harry to run his limousine into the shop.

Once drunk, Harry is shown to be an entirely different individual, who wants the land of the villagers to be returned to them, Matru to marry Bijlee while himself to retire into a religious man.

The villagers, in their fight are supported and advised by Mao who regularly sends messages to the villagers, written on cloth. Later in the film it is revealed that Mao is none other than Matru who is advising the villagers without revealing himself in order to retain the key position as Harry's aide.

Bijlee's love for Baadal is depicted to be a contradiction to her subtle, probably subconscious, knowledge of Baadal's incompatibility with her. This subtle thought aggravated by Baadal's affiliation and deeds supporting his mother's corrupt cause overpowers Bijlee's will to marry him and polarizes her into helping Matru and the villagers instead. After this polarization, seeing Chaudhari Devi and Baadal's ambitions in a new light and while helping the villagers along with Matru, Bijlee falls in love with Matru.

Although they have the help of Matru, his college friends, and Bijlee, the villagers lose their entire harvest to an unexpected rain storm. This harvest, which would have fetched enough money to settle their debts to the government bank and some more for their own survival, is now completely destroyed. Thus the villagers are forced to surrender their land, against their will, to the government in order to settle their debts.

Later, discovering Bijlee's alliance with the villagers, Chaudhari Devi, now cautious, decides to finalize the decree to convert the now acquired land into an SEZ only once Bijlee and Baadal are married.

These conflicts of villagers' loss of their lands, Bijlee's marriage to Baadal, builds up the tension leading up to the wedding at the climax wherein Matru and the villagers have a plan to get Harry drunk who will then call off the wedding. This plan apparently works and Harry is shown to be drunk, succumbing to Matru and the villagers' plan. Now, while drunk, he enters the wedding venue, calls off the wedding, and chases away Chaudhari Devi whilst Baadal and their supporters and decides to get Bijlee and Matru married. Consequently, upon refusal by Matru on the pretext that Harry will not feel the same way about him and Bijlee when sober, Harry, to everyone's surprise, reveals that since he had sworn on Bijlee to not consume even a drop of alcohol has stood by his word, in turn revealing that while he did all that he did appearing to be drunk, he was completely sober instead.

== Cast ==
- Pankaj Kapur as Harphool Singh Mandola a.k.a. Harry
- Imran Khan as Hukum Singh Matru
- Anushka Sharma as Bijlee Mandola
- Shabana Azmi as Chaudhari Devi
- Aarya Babbar as Baadal
- Vikram Kochhar
- Navneet Nishan as Mrs. Talwar
- Ranvir Shorey in a cameo appearance
- Vandita Shrivastava as Village girl (cameo appearance)
- Lekha Washington as Kamini (cameo appearance)
- Sunil Chitkara as Inspector
- Padam Mishra as Vijender

== Soundtrack ==
Matru Ki Bijlee Ka Mandola

Soundtrack album by Vishal Bhardwaj
- Released: 19 December 2012
- Genre: Film soundtrack
- Label: Sony Music India
- Producer: Hitesh Sonik, Clinton Cerejo

The film's music was composed by Vishal Bhardwaj with lyrics written by Gulzar. The soundtrack was released by Sony Music India. The title song, sung by Sukhwinder Singh and Ranjit Barot, was released as a single track on 30 November 2012. Another single track, "Oye Boy Charlie", sung by Rekha Bhardwaj, Mohit Chauhan and Shankar Mahadevan was released on 12 December 2012. The full album was released on 19 December 2012 on JioSaavn.

=== Track listing ===
All tracks are written by Gulzar.

No.	Title	Singer(s)	Length
1.	"Matru Ki Bijlee Ka Mandola"	Sukhwinder Singh, Ranjit Barot	3:52
2.	"Oye Boy Charlie"	Vishal Bhardwaj, Rekha Bhardwaj, Mohit Chauhan, Shankar Mahadevan	5:44
3.	"Khamakha"	Vishal Bhardwaj, Prem Dehati	5:59
4.	"Lootnewale"	Sukhwinder Singh, Master Saleem	4:06
5.	"Shara-Rara-Ra"	Prem Dehati	1:29
6.	"Badal Uthiya"	Rekha Bhardwaj	3:18
7.	"Chaar Dina Ki"	Pankaj Kapur, Imran Khan, Prem Dehati	2:05
8.	"Chor Police"	Pankaj Kapur	0:58
9.	"Nomvula"	African Umoja	1:40
10.	"Badal Uthiya" (Reprise)	Prem Dehati	3:18
11.	"Lootnewale" (Reprise)	Sukhwinder Singh	1:59

== Reception ==
=== Critical response ===
Taran Adarsh of Bollywood Hungama gave 2/5 stars, writing "On the whole, Matru Ki Bijlee Ka Mandola holds your attention in parts, but that's not enough. The first half is lackluster, while the post-interval part catches some steam. However, the excessive length plays a spoilsport. Below expectations!". The Times of India gave 3/5 stars, writing "With its Trilbys and tractors, malls and Maoism, its stretch limo and smart-boy! lines, MKBKM could have been such a fun ride. But sadly, director ka bhi man dola, rather too often". Raja Sen of Rediff.com gave 4/5 stars, writing "Matru Ki Bijlee Ka Mandola has enough substance to warrant repeated viewings". Anupama Chopra of the Hindustan Times gave 2.5/5 stars, writing "A Vishal Bhardwaj film is guaranteed to evoke a strong reaction. You can love it - as I did Maqbool and Kaminey - or dislike it". She reasoned that "Parts of the film soar, but many are saggy and ultimately I was just underwhelmed". Roshni Devi of Koimoi gave 3/5 stars, writing "If you’re a Vishal Bhardwaj fan, be prepared for a fare that’s different from his dark, moody style. The fun and songs should keep you going though".

== Box office ==
=== India ===
Matru Ki Beejlee Ka Mandola opened below the mark where business at multiplexes was much better than single screens. It collected ₹9.56 crore (US$1.0 million) on its opening day. Its little growth on its second day managed around ₹10.50 crore (US$1.1 million) net. The film had a first weekend with a collection of ₹14.4 crore (US$1.5 million) including paid previews. The film netted around ₹20.41 crore (US$2.1 million) in its first week. It further dropped 87% and netted around ₹4.75 crore (US$500,000) in its second weekend. It netted ₹9 crore (US$940,000) in its second week. It earned ₹31 crore (US$3.2 million) at the end of its run in domestic market.

=== Overseas ===
Matru Ki Bijlee Ka Mandola collected $10.5 million in its first 10 days of release overseas, as reported by Box Office India.

== Awards and nominations ==
Award	Category	Nominees	Result	Ref.
59th Filmfare Awards	Best Supporting Actor	Pankaj Kapur	Nominated	
