= Sayani Palit =

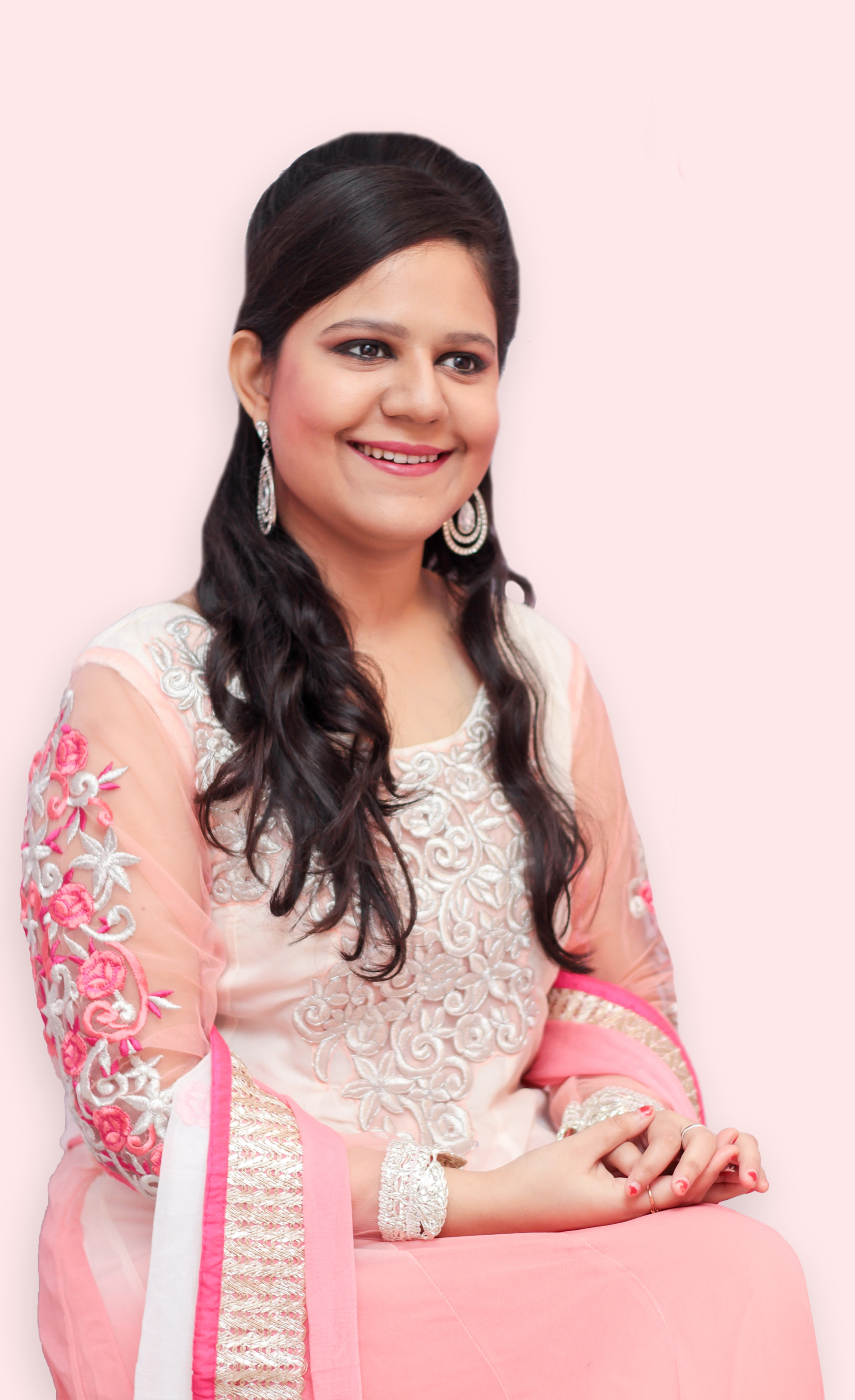
- Sayani Palit

Background information
- Born: Sayani Palit; 5 July 1989 (age 37); Kolkata, West Bengal, India
- Genres: Bollywood, Classical, Semiclassical, Fusion
- Occupations: Classical and Semi-classical Vocalist, Composer, Playback Singer, Arranger, Music Educator

Sayani Palit (Bengali: সায়নি পালিত; born 5 July 1989) is an Indian classical and semi-classical vocalist, playback singer, music composer and performer from Kolkata, West Bengal. Working as a playback singer in Tollywood from 2012, In 2015, Sayani made her Bollywood debut, singing the song, Ove Janiye Reprise for Katti Batti under the direction of Shankar-Ehsaan-Loy. Her biggest break in her musical career took place, when she won the Benadryl Big Golden Voice Season 2 judged by Shankar Mahadevan.

== Early life ==
Sayani Palit started her musical career when she was just 4 years old. She continued her musical age for 20 years under Pandit Ajoy Chakraborty and his wife Chandana Chakraborty. Later, when she was a scholar of ITC Sangeet Research Academy, she took taleem from Padma Bhushan Girija Devi. A first-class first in Bachelor's and master's degree in Classical Music from Calcutta University, Sayani is a regular performing artist of All India Radio. Recently, she submitted her PhD(thesis), 'Influence of Thumri' (film music) to the University of Kolkata.

== Professional career ==
Sayani has worked as a playback and background singer for the following tracks:

Year	Film/Organization Name	Language	Song name	Other notes
2013	Proloy	Bengali	Roshni Elo	Tollywood Playback
2013	Government of Maharashtra	Hindi	Rajiv Gandhi Jivandayi Arogya Yojna	Ad Film
2013	Hanuman.com	Bengali	Momo Chitte Thumri Fusion Style	Tollywood Playback
2014	Chirodini Tumi Je Amar 2	Bengali	Background Score	Tollywood Playback
2014	Pendulum	Bengali	Surreal Space Theme	Tollywood Playback
2014	Gaan Golpo Aar Gaan	Bengali	Gaan Golpo Aar Gaan	Ruposhi Bangla TV Commercial
2014	Singur	Hindi, Bengali	Theme	Tollywood Movie
2015	Katti Batti	Hindi	Ove Janiye Reprise Edition	Bollywood Playback
2016	Shalimar Agarbattis	Hindi	Ad Song	TV Commercial
2017	Enable India	Hindi	Garv Se Jiyenge Hum	Music Video with Shankar Mahadevan
2017	Allahabad Bank	Hindi	Ad Song	TV Commercial
2017	Neend Short Film	Hindi		Bollywood Playback, Starring Deepti Naval
2018	Grameenphone	Bengali	Megh Jomeche	Playback, TV Commercial
2018	Pichutan, Tele Film, Bangladesh	Bengali	Alo	Playback, Gaanchill Music
2018	Shesh Porjonto, Tele Film, Bangladesh	Bengali	Bhalobese Bhul Korini , Playback,	Gaanchill Music
2019	Megh Bristi	Bengali	E Moner Anache Kanache	Tollywood Playback,
2019	Mukhomukhi	Bengali	Yaad Piya Ki Aaye	Tollywood Playback, Directed by Kamaleswar Mukherjee, Music Directed by Debojyoti Mishra
2019	Zee Bangla	Bengali	Sonar Sansar 2019 – Aschya Award, Theme Song	Playback,
2019	Monkey King	Hindi	Jadu	Playback, Yet to Release
2020	Season's Greetings	Hindi	Sajani Sajani	Bollywood Playback, Directed by Ram Kamal Mukherjee,
2020	Asur	Bengali	Tor Hoye Jete Chai	Tollywood Playback duet with Mohammed Irfan (singer) for the film Asur starring Abir Chatterjee Nusraat Jit Directed by Pavel
2021	Gangster	Hindi	Raaho Main Humsafar	Playback, Directed by Shahid Kazmi,
2021	Malini	Bengali	O Je Mane Na Mana	Playback, Directed by Arpan Basak,
2022	Kadambari Aajo	Bengali	Amar Ae Poth, Amaro Porano Jaha Chae	Kadambari Aajo is a Bengali movie released on 23 Sep 2022. The movie is directed by Sharmistha Deb,
2023	Kurban	Bengali	Background Score	Tollywood Playback,
2025	Zariyaa	Bengali	Ebhabe theke jeo	The heart of Kolkata, a late-night RJ and an indie filmmaker cross paths, unraveling a soulful tale of music, love, and memory. Zariyaa(short film) is a poetic journey through the city's rhythm, art, and quiet transformations.,

== Discography ==
=== Singles ===
1. Ruh Mein Hain-Sur Prabaha(2012) – Self Composed Sufi Song
2. Naa Jaane Kyun: Ghazal(2015) – Self composed Ghazal
3. Ishq Ki Inteha: Ghazal(2015) – Self composed Ghazal
4. Kabhie Kabhie: Indipop(2015)
5. Raat Ke Saaye feat. Abhay Jodhpurkar and Sayani Palit(2016)
6. Wo Jab Bhi Udaas: Ghazal(2016) – Self Composed Ghazal
7. Reliving Rahman – Celebrating 50 (2017) -A journey through 50 Rahmanious compositions in approx. 1000 seconds
8. Garv Se Jiyenge Hum – Shankar Mahadevan feat. Sayani Palit (2017) – This production is in support for Enable India
9. Zindagi – ZIA | Sanjoy Das (2023) – Composed by X-Raf Experimental Raga and Folk
10. Rimjhim Barse – Keshab Dey feat. Sayani Palit 2025
11. Saaware – Merchant Records Presents, Featuring Sayani Datta and Supratim Roy, Sayani Palit 2026
12. Mon Amar Kamon Kamon Kore (মন আমার কেমন কেমন করে) – T-Series presents, Anirban Sur & Sayani Palit
13. Modhuro Maataal Mon – Bickram Ghosh, Sayani Palit

=== First album: Khwahishain ===
Khwahishain is the first full-fledged self-composed Hindi contemporary album of Sayani Palit released in 2014. This album is a melodic saga which depicts hues of romance through songs of different genres like Indipop, Folk, Ghazal, Experimental and others. The album consists of 6 tracks with Unn Bina being the most popular out of them. Unn Bina is an exclusive 11 beat song which got much popularity due to its creative music video.

Track List:

Track 1 – Ab Jao Na Mohan Mere

Track 2 – Unn Bina

Track 3 – Rahon Mein Humsafar

Track 4 – Khwahishein Dil Mein Jo Thi

Track 5 – Khushiyan Yun Chalke Hain

Track 6 – Dil Mein Khamoshiyan

Track 7 – O Je Mane Na Mana Malini- A Film By Arpan Basak

=== SVF Devotional ===
Song List:

1 – Hey Gobindo (হে গোবিন্দ)

2 – Hanuman Chalisa (হনুমান চালিসা)

3 – জবা হয়ে (Joba Hoye)

4 – Shokhi Ami Na Hoy (সখি আমি না হয়)

5 – Om Namah Shivay (ওম নমঃ শিবায়)

6 – Bhubono Mohini (ভুবন মোহিনী)

7 – Bhobo Shagoro (ভবসাগর)

8 – Ontore Tumi (অন্তরে তুমি)

9 – Joy Joy Debi (জয় জয় দেবী)

10 – Shyamo Shokha (শ্যাম সখা)

=== Other albums ===
Rendezvous with Tagore – Jokhhon Eshechhile (2016) Tagore Songs, Rabindranath Tagore

Notuner Daak – Tumi Kon Bhangonero Pathe (2017) Tagore Songs, Rabindranath Tagore

== Awards and recognitions ==
- Sayani received the State Award for the role model category from the honourable Governor of West Bengal.
- National scholarship award for the young artists. 2010/2011 from the ministry of culture Govt of India.
- 1st class 1st in bachelor's degree in 2011 & Masters' in 2013 under CU
- Completed Doctor of Philosophy in Music from University of Calcutta.
- Received Telegraph award for excellence in 2006
- Sayani has been awarded the Benadryl Big Golden Voice of India Season 2 title (judged by Shankar Mahadevan).
- Sayani has recently been nominated as the 'Best Budding Playback Singer' at the Mirchi Music Awards Bangla 2014
- Her recent video "Reliving Rahman" has been appreciated by Music Maestro A. R. Rahman himself
- Gold Medalist in Graduation & Post Graduation level as well as a PhD research scholar in music from the University of Calcutta
- Performed in USA, UK & Bangladesh including Times Square & Queen Elizabeth Hall.
