= Khajoor Pe Atke =

- Official Poster
- Directed by: Harsh Chhaya
- Written by: Harsh Chhaya
- Produced by: Amrit Sethia
- Starring: Manoj Pahwa; Vinay Pathak; Seema Pahwa; Dolly Ahluwalia; Sanah Kapur; Vandita Shrivastava; Prathamesh Parab; Suneeta Sengupta; Alka amin Vicky Arora
- Cinematography: Sidhant Chowdhry
- Edited by: Sattyajit Gazmer
- Music by: Bickram Ghosh
- Production company: Welcome Friends Productions
- Distributed by: PVR Pictures
- Release date: 18 May 2018
- Running time: 119 minutes
- Country: India
- Language: Hindi

Khajoor Pe Atke (transl. Into the fire) is a comedy film written and directed by Harsh Chhaya, who makes his directorial debut. Starring Manoj Pahwa, Vinay Pathak, Dolly Ahluwalia, Seema Pahwa, Sanah Kapoor, Suneeta Sengupta, produced by Welcome Friends Productions, and presented by S.O.I.E., the film was released in theatres on 18 May 2018 and is distributed by PVR Pictures, with music on Zee Music.

== Cast ==
- Manoj Pahwa as Jeetendar
- Vinay Pathak as Ravindar
- Seema Pahwa as Sushila
- Dolly Ahluwalia as Lalita
- Sanah Kapur as Nayantara "Nayan" "Rosy"
- Nabeel Ahmed as Amit (Nayantara's brother)
- Vandita Shrivastava as Bar Dancer
- Prathamesh Parab as Rocky
- Suneeta Sengupta as Anuradha
- Alka Amin as Kadambari
- Vicky Arora as Alok
- Boman Irani as Abhishek
- Harsh Chhaya as Kiran Karmakar

== Soundtrack ==
All the songs of the film and the background music for the same has been composed by Bickram Ghosh from Kolkata and lyrics are penned by Kumaar and the director Harsh Chhaya himself (who has also sung the song "Dhokha" in the film). The complete soundtrack is available on Zee Music.

=== Track listing ===
Track listing
No.	Title	Lyrics	Music	Singer(s)	Length
1.	"Aao Na Dekha"	Harsh Chhaya	Bickram Ghosh	Ujjaini Mukherjee, Timir Biswas	3:04
2.	"Duniya"	Kumaar	Bickram Ghosh	Ujjaini Mukherjee, Divya Kumar	2:45
3.	"Sumdi Mein Jhol"	Harsh Chhaya	Bickram Ghosh	Kalpana Patowary	3:47
4.	"Dhokha"	Harsh Chhaya	Bickram Ghosh	Harsh Chhaya	2:16
Total length:					11:53

== Reception ==
Kennith Rosario of The Hindu wrote, "The film is self-aware of being an unrestrained comedy and maintains a light tone for grim subjects like death, coma and euthanasia but it also has its mawkish moments that could have been done without. Underneath the amateurish execution, sentimentality and clichés, lies an enjoyable fare best relished for the comic timing of its actors." Prasanna D Zore of Rediff.com gave the film 2.5 out of 5, writing, "Khajoor Pe Atke is a half baked satire on the selfish us that only partly exposes the darkness that lurks within every family." Nandini Ramnath of Scroll.in wrote, "There isn’t enough of a plot to extend over 119 minutes. With a tighter script and trimmer running time, Chhaya might have actually been on to something special."
