= Chalo Let's Go =

2008 Indian Bengali film

- Film poster
- Directed by: Anjan Dutt
- Written by: Anjan Dutt
- Produced by: Arun Poddar
- Starring: Saswata Chatterjee; Parambrata Chatterjee; Ritwick Chakraborty; Rudranil Ghosh
- Cinematography: Indranil Mukherjee
- Edited by: Mainak Bhaumik
- Music by: Neel Dutt
- Release date: 6 June 2008
- Running time: 142 minutes
- Country: India
- Language: Bengali

Chalo Let's Go is a 2008 Indian drama movie in Bengali starring Ritwick Chakraborty, Rudranil Ghosh, Saswata Chatterjee and Parambrata Chatterjee, written and directed by Anjan Dutt.

== Plot ==
This is a story about four friends, Hari, Shekhar, Ashim, and Sanjay, who went to the same school. Ashim studied to be a doctor but decided to never pursue that profession. Sanjay worked for an advertising agency but left the job. The other two never held jobs. Together, they started a Bengali band, but they were beaten up by the public at a stage show in North Bengal. After that, they vowed to never perform again.

At this point, they start a travel agency called 'Gharoa Travels'. Their first trip begins with nine passengers. On the way to the hills, a young woman named Ria suddenly joins them. The film follows their journey through North Bengal. The ten tourists and four operators form an assorted medley of characters. As the journey progresses, their personalities slowly unfold. The film has flash-forwards juxtaposed with the present, giving the audience a glimpse into the fates of the characters as the story moves forward.

== Cast ==
- Saswata Chatterjee as Ashim
- Parambrata Chatterjee as Sanjoy
- Rudranil Ghosh as Hari
- Ritwick Chakraborty as Shekhar
- Churni Ganguly as Miss Gombhir (or Miss Ganguly)
- Aparajita Ghosh Das as Ria/Keya (as Aparajita)
- Bidipta Chakraborty as Madhuja
- Koneenica Banerjee as June
- Neel Mukherjee as Rudrashekhar
- Arindam Sil as Rabi Chatterjee
- Kaushik Ganguly as Anando
- Barun Chanda as Prof. Dhurjati
- Sunita Sengupta as Tulu
- Dhruv Mookerji as Dr. Basu

=== Cast synopsis ===
- Saswata Chattopadhyay plays Ashim, one of the four friends who start the travel agency. Ashim is a trained doctor, but he wants to do something else. His life changes completely after the trip to Darjeeling. The character is very dynamic and he changes for the better at the end. He is attracted to Miss Gombhir in a very subtle way.
- Parambrato Chattopadhyay plays Sanjoy. He is the narrator of the story. Sanjoy wanted to be a journalist but starts a travel agency instead with three friends (Rudranil, Saswata and Ritwick). He is sensitive, and thinks a lot before he speaks. Sanjoy is the backbone of Chalo Let’s Go.
- Ritwick Chakraborty plays Shekhar, one of the four friends. Shekhar makes it very big as a singer later. He is the son of wealthy father, rude and always angry but very innocent. There's no love angle to this character; he is basically an ambitious guy.
- Rudranil Ghosh plays Hari, the lead vocalist of a Bangla band. The other members are Parambrata, Ritwick and Saswata. But after a disastrous performance, the four friends get into the travel business. Then they go travelling. A lot of the story unfolds in Darjeeling. Hari is a simple guy whose girlfriends dump him because he can't speak English. But Ria falls for him.
- Arindam Sil plays Rabi Chatterjee, a Casanova who lives with June (Koneenica) and loves to introduce himself as "Madamcrackerologist".
- Churni Gangopadhyay plays Miss Ganguly, a very sophisticated detective story writer. Her fellow travellers call her Miss Gombhir. But she is a very understanding woman and before anyone else realises she becomes a part of their lives. Though she seems unapproachable, she is just the opposite.
- Koneenika Bandyopadhyay plays June, a very small role. She is a very fashionable girl in a live-in relationship with Rabi (Arindam Sil). June doesn't interact with anyone else. And everyone gossips about her.
- Aparajita Ghosh Das plays Ria, who is very confused with life. Ria is a bit tomboyish and she hides her identity because she thinks it will help her in some way. The one person she connects with is Churni (Ganguly), who gives her shelter. Parambrata and Rudranil like Ria, so there's a love triangle and even more confusion.
- Kaushik Ganguly plays Anando, a Bengali middle-class husband who is extremely scared of his wife Madhuja (Bidipta). He gets scolded by her every now and then, but actually is quite knowledgeable and interested in many things.
- Neel Mukherjee plays Rudrashekhar, a bachelor who loves to travel but complains about everything and everyone. He cribs about his seat on the bus, his hotel room, and everything else under the sun. The others dislike him for this but there's a slow change in him and later he becomes friendly and helpful towards the four boys.
- Barun Chanda plays Dhurjati, a kinky professor of chemistry. Nobody knows much about him. He has a research paper to develop, which is actually a book on pornography. He can't see anything good in anyone. And he is secretly attracted to Miss Gombhir.
- Sunita Sengupta plays Tulu, an NRI married to Dhruv (Dr Basu). They are on a vacation in India. Tulu is a little psychic. She has a strong sixth sense and is into tarot card reading. Her husband pampers her a lot.
- Bidipta Chakraborty plays Madhuja, the middle-class wife of Kaushik Ganguly. She is full of Bengali idiosyncrasies. She would take care of her husband and worry about him. But she is trapped in a bad marriage and she confesses that to June (Koneenica).
- Dhruv Mookherji plays Dr Basu, a cardiologist from London. He is married to Tulu (Sunita) and has come to India after many years. Dr. Basu loves to jabber away and would strike up a conversation even when the other person is not interested. The only person he doesn't get along with is Dhurjati (Chanda), whose name Basu repeatedly gets wrong.

== Soundtrack ==
The music has been composed by Neel Dutt and has been released under Saregama.

Track No.	Title	Length	Music composer	Performed By	Courtesy(TM/C)
01	"Chalo Let's Go"	04:43	Neel Dutt	Anjan Dutt, Srikanta Acharya, Ujjaini Mukherjee, Rupam Islam	Saregama
02	"Ei Path"	04:31	Neel Dutt	Anjan Dutt, Srikanta Acharya, Ujjaini Mukherjee	Saregama
03	"Aachhe Dukkho Aachhe Mrittyu"	03:41	Neel Dutt	Srikanta Acharya	Saregama
04	"Gaan Khuje Paai"	05:08	Neel Dutt	Rupankar Bagchi	Saregama
05	"Chupi Chupi Raat"	05:03	Neel Dutt	Rupankar Bagchi Ujjaini Mukherjee	Saregama
06	"Cross The Line"	05:10	Neel Dutt	Rupam Islam	Saregama
07	"Amazing Grace"	05:03	Neel Dutt	Nachiketa & Taniya Sen	Saregama
