= Aishwarya Nigam =

Indian singer (born 1989)

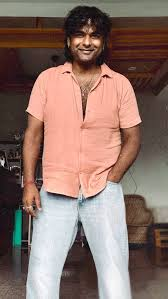

Background information
- Born: Aishwarya Ranjan; 4 July 1989 (age 37); Muzaffarpur, Bihar, India
- Genre: Bollywood
- Occupation: Singer
- Instrument: Vocals
- Years active: 2005–present
- Spouse: Deepali Sahay (m. 2019)

Aishwarya Nigam (born 4 July 1989) is an Indian singer. He is best known as a playback singer in Hindi films, particularly for films like Dabangg. He has received several awards for the song "Munni Badnaam Hui" from Dabangg.

== Early and family life ==
He was born in Muzaffarpur, Bihar. His mother Arti Ranjan works as lecturer in Mukherjee Seminary, Muzaffarpur while his father Mukesh Ranjan is a manager in Punjab National Bank. He has done his schooling from Sun Shine Prep High School, Muzaffarpur.

Nigam has lived his childhood in New Colony Sherpur, Muzaffarpur, Bihar. Nigam is married to singer and contestant of the Indian Idol 3 Deepali Sahay, who is also a singer.

== Career ==
Aishwarya Nigam has participated in the Music competition Sa Re Ga Ma Pa Ek Main Aur Ek Tu 2006 for Zee TV. Nigam and Ujjaini Mukherjee were declared the winners on 24 June 2006. Nigam was one of the contestants of Jo Jeeta Wohi Superstar, a singing competition on Star Plus channel. He represented the Champions team. He was eliminated on 25 April 2008. Aishwarya was one of the contestants of music competition show IPL Rockstar on Colors TV channel. He was among the top three finalists of IPL Rockstar. He is much inspired from Sonu Nigam: that made him keep title as "Nigam".

He sang the title track of Kitani Mohabbat Hai for seasons I and II, a daily soap on NDTV imagine. He has worked with renowned music directors like Lalit Pandit, Anu Malik, Pritam, Sajid-Wajid, Shameer Tandon. He sang a song for the serial Dill Mill Gayye.

Aishwarya is fondly known for singing the famous item song "Munni Badnaam Hui" from Salman Khan starer Dabangg. He has sung "Maara re Sixer Maara Re Four" from the movie Ferrari Ki Sawaari, a movie by Vidhu Vinod Chopra. The Hit Item number "Tere Mohalle" from the movie "Besharam" starring Ranbir Kapoor is also sung by Aishwarya Nigam.

== Discography ==
=== Film songs ===
Following are the list of songs that Aishwarya Nigam has sung for various Indian Movies

Year	Film	Song(s)	Co-singer(s)	Notes
2018	"Lupt"	"Title Track"		
2016	"Shorgul"	"Baroodi Hawa"		
2015	"Kuch Kuch Locha Hai"	"Daru Peke Dance "	Neha Kakkar	
2014	Titoo MBA	"Plan Bana Le"	Surbhi Dashputra	
2014	Hum Hai Teen Khurafaati	"Chupke Se"	Shreya Ghoshal	
2014	Bobby Jasoos	"Sweety"	Monali Thakur	
2014	Gang of Ghosts	"Naach Madhubala" "Rimco Machis" "Medley"	Jonita Gandhi; Sudesh Bhosle	
2013	Besharam	"Tere Mohalle" "Tere Mohalle" (remix)	Mamta Sharma	Music by Lalit Pandit
2013	Calapore	"Bindaas" "Musical"	Arjuna Harjai; Anirudh Bhola, Lakshmi Madhusudan, Surabhi Dashputra & Arjuna Harjai	
2012	Ferrari Ki Sawaari	"Maara Re Sixer Maara Re Four"	Sonu Nigam	
2012	Rakhtbeej	"Adha Gila"		
2010	Dabangg	"Munni Badnaam Hui"	Mamta Sharma	
2009	Mere Khwabon Mein Jo Aaye	"Zindgi me Nayi Baat Hone Ko"		
2006	Corporate	"O Sikander"		

=== Non-film songs ===
Year	Album	Song(s)	Co-singer(s)	Notes
2015	Box Cricket League	Title Track		Gujarati Song
2014	Rashid Ali Official	"Assorted Medley"	Rashid Ali	YouTube Release
2014	Red Ribbon	"Yeh Mujhe Kya Hua"	Lalitya Munshaw	
2014	Hu Tu Tu	"Hu Tu Tu Tu"	Vishal Mishra	Marathi Song
2014	Doctor's Enthem	"Har lamha har ghadi"	Aditi Paul, Bhavya Pandit and Amitabh Narayan	
2012	Bihar Pradesh Geet	"Hum Bihar Hai"	Sonali	
2012	Bihar Pradesh Geet	"Chalo Bihar"	Sonali	
2009	Kitani Mohabbat Hai	"Kitani Mohabbat Hai"		Title Song

== Television ==
Following are the list of Reality Shows that Aishwarya Nigam has done.

Year	Show	Channel	Awards	Ref.
2009	IPL Rockstar	Zee TV	Top 3 Finalist	
2008	Ek Se Badhkar Ek	Zee TV	Awarded ‘Best Singer of the series'	
2007	Jo Jeeta Wohi Super Star		Champion's Team	
2006	Sa Re Ga Ma Pa Ek Main Aur Ek Tu	Winner		
2005	Sa Re Ga Ma Pa Challenge 2005			

== Accolades ==
Year	Award Ceremony	Category	Film	Song	Result	Reference(s)
2010	Mirchi Music Awards	male Vocalist of The Year	Dabangg	"Munni Badnaam"	Won	

== See also ==
- List of Indian playback singers
