= Boxer (2018 film) =

Indian Bengali sports drama romantic film

Boxer (Bengali Movie) 2018
- Theatrical release poster
- Bengali: বক্সার
- Directed by: Sanjoy Bardhan
- Written by: Ivana Dutta
- Produced by: Koushik K Roy; New Era Entertainment
- Starring: Shikhar Srivastava; Ena Saha; Soumitra Chatterjee; Rajatava Dutta; Labony Sarkar; Sudip Mukherjee; Sudip Sarkar
- Cinematography: Madhusudan Shi
- Edited by: Sanjib Datta
- Music by: Samidh Mukerjee; Joy-Anjan
- Distributed by: New Era Entertainment Private Limited
- Release date: 5 January 2018
- Running time: 150 minutes
- Country: India
- Language: Bengali

Boxer (Bengali: বক্সার) is an Indian Bengali sports drama romantic film directed by Sanjoy Bardhan. Boxer is about a young boxer based in Kolkata. The film stars debutant Shikhar Srivastava and Ena Saha in the lead roles and was produced by Koushik K Roy, also known as Roy Koushik. The music was released through SVF Music. It was heavily inspired by the 2016 Bollywood Film Do Lafzon Ki Kahani, which was itself based on the 2011 South Korean Film Always.

== Plot ==
The film is the story of an 18-year-old boxer, Rony, who has reached adulthood after making many mistakes, but must move on. The boxing ring is a metaphor for life; every hurt and injury is a lesson in life, as he strives to win not a trophy but his first love, Jinia.

== Cast ==
- Shikhar Srivastava as Rony
- Ena Saha as Jinia
- Soumitra Chatterjee as Church Father
- Rajatava Dutta as Digvijoy Sengupta
- Laboni Sarkar as Sanghamitra Sengupta
- Sudip Mukherjee as Boxing Coach
- Sudip Sarkar as Siddhartha Chowdhury
- Riya Bhattacharje as Item Girl Dancer
- Samidh Mukerjee as Rock Singer
- Dheeraj Shaji as Kiran

== Soundtrack ==
Boxer

Soundtrack album by Samidh Mukerjee, Joy-Anjan
- Released: 2017
- Genre: Feature film soundtrack
- Length: 25:18
- Language: Bengali
- Label: SVF Music

The music for the film was composed by Samidh Mukerjee and Joy-Anjan. Akash Chakrabarty, Budhaditta and Samidh Mukherjee have written the lyrics for songs. "Du chokher Isharay" song composed by Joy-Anjan and penned by Budhaditta. The soundtrack was released by SVF Music. The full music album was released on 26 April 2017.

No.	Title	Singer(s)	Length
1.	"Boxer Anthem"	Sudipta Gain, Samidh Mukerjee	3:01
2.	"Sob Khali Khali"	Samidh Mukerjee	3:24
3.	"Du chokher Isharay"	Asit	4:19
4.	"Rock N Roll"	Samidh Mukerjee, Ujjaini Mukherjee	5:42
5.	"Nesha Nesha"	Ujjaini Mukherjee, Samidh Mukerjee, Suyasha Sengupta	4:10
Total length:			25:18
