= Sa Re Ga Ma Pa Challenge 2005 =

- Season 2005
- Starring: Ismail Darbar; Himesh Reshammiya; Aadesh Shrivastava; Jatin–Lalit
- No. of episodes: 74

Release
- Original network: Zee TV
- Original release: 9 June 2005 – 24 February 2006

Sa Re Ga Ma Pa Challenge 2005 is a reality series, an extension of the Sa Re Ga Ma Pa programme that was first aired in 1995 on Zee TV. With the new "Challenge" series, Zee TV brought 48 potential singers that are living in India.

== Elimination table ==
=== Mahayudh ===
| Contestant | Phase 1 | Phase 2 | Phase 3 |
|---|---|---|---|
| Nanu Gurjar | | | —N/a |
| Supriya Joshi | | —N/a | —N/a |
| Vishwas Rai | | | |
| Raktima Mukherjee | | | |
| Debojit Saha | | | |
| Nihira Joshi | | | |
| Saptak Bhattacharjee | | —N/a | —N/a |
| Manjeera Ganguly | | | —N/a |
| Swananda Karmarkar | | | |
| Bhumik Shah | | —N/a | —N/a |
| Banjyotsna Borgohain | | —N/a | —N/a |
| Dilshad Ali | | | —N/a |
| Twinkle Bajpai | | | |
| Niladri Debnath | | | |
| V. Hemabindu | | | —N/a |
| Rajeev Thapa | | | |
| Ujjaini Mukherjee | | | |
| Shaarib Sabri | | | |
| Joyeeta Sen | | | |
| Vineet Singh | | | |
| Anindita Sarkar | | —N/a | —N/a |
| Mohammed Irfan | | | |
| Himani Kapoor | | | |
| Vishwanath Batunge | | —N/a | —N/a |
| Aishwarya Nigam | | —N/a | —N/a |
| Priyani Vani | | —N/a | —N/a |
| Paresh Madhaparia | | | —N/a |
| Vineeta Punn | | | —N/a |
| Abhijeet Ghoshal | | | |
| Sanchali Chatterjee | | | |
| Vedala Hemachandra | | | |
| Keka Ghoshal | | | |

=== Chakravyuh ===
| Contestants | Day 1 |
|---|---|
| Raktima Mukherjee | |
| Keka Ghoshal | |
| Himani Kapoor | |
| Debojit Saha | |
| Mohammed Irfan | |
| Sharib Sabri | |

=== Brahmastra ===
Voters were supposed to SMS their votes for the Gharana, and the mentor with the most votes would be able to call back 3 boys and 3 girls, out of which the top boy and girl would be voted back in. The Jai Mata Di Rock Gharana got the most votes, and so Himesh chose who would be called back to join his Gharana.

| Contestants | Mentor Callback | Results |
|---|---|---|
| Aishwarya Nigam | Yes | 11% |
| Joyeeta Sen | Yes, called after Vineeta declined | 13% |
| Vishwas Rai | No | |
| Ujjaini Mukherjee | Yes | 19% |
| Niladri Debnath | No | |
| Vineeta Punn | Yes, but could not make it due to ill health | |
| Dilshad Ali | Yes | 18% |
| Nanu Gurjar | No | |
| Sanchali Chatterjee | Yes | 6% |
| Paresh Madhaparia | Yes | 30% |

=== Agnipariksha ===
| Contestants | Week 1 | Week 2 | Week 3 | Week 4 | Week 5 | Week 6 | Week 7 | Week 8 | Week 9 | Week 10 | Week 11 | Finale |
|---|---|---|---|---|---|---|---|---|---|---|---|---|
| Debojit Saha | | | | | | | Bottom 2 | | | Most votes | | Won |
| Vineet Singh | | | | | | | | Bottom 3 | Bottom 2 | | | Runner-up |
| Vedala Hemachandra | | | | Tie | | Bottom 3 | | Bottom 2 | | | Eliminated | |
| Himani Kapoor | | | Bottom 3 | | | | | | | Eliminated | | |
| Nihira Joshi | | | | Tie | | | | | Eliminated | | | |
| Paresh Madhaparia | | | | | | Bottom 2 | Bottom 3 | Eliminated | | | | |
| Ujjaini Mukherjee | Bottom 2 | | | | Bottom 3 | | Eliminated | | | | | |
| Twinkle Bajpai | | Bottom 2 | Bottom 2 | | Bottom 2 | Eliminated | | | | | | |
| Rajeev Kumar | Bottom 3 | | | Bottom 3 | Eliminated | | | | | | | |
| Sharib Sabri | | Bottom 3 | Eliminated | | | | | | | | | |
| Swananda Karmarkar | | Eliminated | | | | | | | | | | |
| Raktima Mukherjee | Eliminated | | | | | | | | | | | |

== Synopsis ==
=== Elimination rounds ===
The process had started with elimination rounds by the four mentors: Aadesh Shrivastava, Himesh Reshammiya, Jatin–Lalit and Ismail Darbar. The mentors picked one girl and one boy amidst 4 boys and 4 girls who took part during the course of six weeks. Through this, 16 contestants out of the 48 were eliminated. The 32 remaining contestants consisted of 16 boys and 16 girls.

==== Episode 1 ====
Neeta Pandey, Nakash Aziz, Manjeera Ganguly, Paresh Madhaparia, Joyeeta Sen, Mukesh, Shoumi Roy, and Rajeev Thapa competed. Joyeeta, Manjeera, Paresh, and Nakash were selected. Paresh was given a yes from all 4 teams while Rajeev and Nakash got 3. The other contestants broke the tie and voted in favor of Nakash. Joyeeta got a yes from all 4, while Manjeera got 3.

==== Episode 2 ====
Sagar Tildurkar, V. Hemabindu, Vishwas Rai, Banjyotsna, Sharib Sabri, Prachi Singla, Hemachandra, and Jolly competed. Hemabindu and Banjyotsna got a yes from all 4 each, meaning they both advanced. Hemachandra advanced with a unanimous approval. Vishwas and Sharib tied with 3, and so all contestants voted, and it was still a tie. Eventually, the musicians were asked to vote, and they picked Sharib.

==== Episode 3 ====
Shivani, Niladri Debnath, Rimi Chopra, Nanu Gurjar, Nihira Joshi, Akhilesh, Swananda Karmarkar, and Kaushik competed. Nihira and Swananda got a yes from all 4, automatically qualifying them for the Top 32. Niladri and Nanu also got 4 yes votes, qualifying them as well.

==== Episode 4 ====
Piyashi, Aishwarya Nigam, Sinchan Dixit, Jai Prasad, Twinkle Bajpai, Bhumik Shah, Supriya Joshi, and Pramod Tripathi competed. Aishwarya, Bhumik, Twinkle, and Supriya were chosen for the 32.

==== Episode 5 ====
Abhijeet Ghoshal, Sanchali Chatterjee, Chirag Panchal, Soma Bhattacharya, Sandeep Batraa, Sayali Joshi, Vishwanath Batunge, and Himani Kapoor competed. Abhijeet and Vishwanath got 4 thumbs ups, and Sanchali and Himani got 4 thumbs ups as well, qualifying them for the Top 32.

==== Episode 6 ====
Shreekumar Vakkiyil, Annie Joshi, Irfan Ali, Sanchari Bose, Shripartho, Anindita Sarkar, Dilshad Ali, and Priyani Vani were the final batch of the 48 finalists. Dilshad and Irfan qualified for the Top 32 and Sanchari, Anindita, and Priyani tied with each other. The mentors broke the tie by advancing Priyani and Anindita to the final round.

=== Final 32 ===
From the final 32 round onwards, guest judges like Shiv, Hari, Pandit Jasraj, Kavita Krishnamurthy, Alka Yagnik, Jagjit Singh etc. were invited to comment and judge all the remaining contestants. Each week features a different judge.

The 32 remaining contestants were put into different Gharanas (or groups, led by a "magical mentor", one of the 4 judges). Each Gharana had to pick 8 contestants in total from the contestants selected through the auditions, elimination rounds and wildcard entries.

Also, from this round onwards, the public was able to vote via SMS or by phone for their favourite singer. Each week, two contestants will be eliminated until the final round.

The only three contestants to have gone through the perfect green card on first day pattern were Vineet Singh, Hemachandra, and Nihira Joshi. Nihira Joshi was the only girl out of all to have been perfect when being chosen by judges. She was also the most consistent participant throughout the competition.

==== Episode 1 ====
The boys were divided up into the 4 gharanas—Himesh's Jai Mata Di Let's Rock, Aadesh's Jai Ho, Ismail's Yalgaar Ho, and Jatin–Lalit's Dum. The four groups' names were written on paper in a bowl. Audience members were invited to draw names from the bowl. Ismail was drawn first, and he chose to pick Niladri. Aadesh was next, and he picked Hemachandra. Himesh picked Dilshad, and Jatin–Lalit picked Abhijeet. After the mentors' pick, the remaining 4 boys' names were put in the bowl, and they were given the opportunity to pick their mentor. Vishwanath picked Aadesh, Nanu picked Himesh, Bhumik picked Jatin–Lalit, and as such, Paresh was placed in Ismail's gharana.

After this, the Soubhagya Round took place. This was a wildcard round, where winners of Sa Re Ga Ma Pa shows from years past would be able to perform. The mentors would be able to pick contestants from this batch to be a part of their gharanas, and any contestants who didn't perform well would have to fight for a spot in the gharanas with standby contestants, Rajeev Thapa and Vishwas Rai, who had previously been eliminated from the 48.

Debojit Saha, Prashant, Saptak Bhattacharjee, and Vineet Singh all performed as a part of this. Debojit was given to Ismail, Saptak to Jatin–Lalit, and Vineet to Himesh. Prashant would have to compete with the standby contestants.

The remaining contestants were assigned through the Diksha Round, where they will perform and can avoid competing with the standby contestants.

Nakash, Sharib, Irfan, and Aishwarya all performed, and Nakash was asked to compete with the standby contestants.

Prashant and Rajeev faced off with each other, and Rajeev was picked by Aadesh. Vishwas and Nakash faced off, and Vishwas was picked.

Aadesh picked Vishwas, Jatin–Lalit picked Sharib, Himesh picked Aishwarya, and Ismail got Irfan.

==== Episode 2 ====
Today was the girls' turn to be assigned a mentor.

In the Guru Round, Ismail again was drawn first, and picked Nihira. Himesh picked Joyeeta, Aadesh picked Hemabindu, and Jatin–Lalit were last and picked Sanchali. In the Shishya Round, Himani was drawn first and picked Aadesh. Swananda picked Jatin–Lalit, Twinkle picked Ismail, and Supriya was drawn last and so was given Himesh as he hadn't been picked yet.

In the Soubhagya Round, Keka Ghoshal, Ujjaini Mukherjee, Raktima Mukherjee, and Vineeta Punn were all invited back to participate. Keka's performance was the least of all 4, and so she was asked to be in the standby batch (consisting of her, Sanchari, and Neeta). The remaining three were given gharanas—Ujjaini picked Jatin–Lalit, Vineeta picked Ismail, and Raktima picked Aadesh.

In the Diksha Round, Banjyotsna, Priyani, Manjeera, and Anindita performed. Banjyotsna was asked to compete with the standby batch.

Banjyotsna beat Sanchari to claim a spot in the Top 32, as did Keka with Neeta.

The gharanas are set in stone, with Keka picking Aadesh, Manjeera picking Jatin–Lalit, Priyani picking Himesh, and Anindita getting Ismail.

===== Gharanas =====
Himesh Reshammiya's group was the Jai Mata Di Let's Rock Gharana, consisting of:

- Dilshad Ali (Group 2) -- eliminated 09/09/2005
- Banjyotsna Borgohain (Group 2) -- eliminated 08/12/2005
- Joyeeta Sen (Group 3)
- Vineet Singh (Group 3)
- Priyani Vani (Group 4) -- eliminated 08/26/2005
- Aishwarya Nigam (Group 4) -- eliminated 08/26/2005
- Supriya Joshi (Group 1) -- eliminated 08/05/2005
- Nanu Gurjar (Group 1) -- eliminated 09/02/2005

Aadesh Shrivastava's group was the Jai Ho Gharana, consisting of:

- Rajeev Thapa (Group 2)
- Himani Kapoor (Group 3)
- Vedala Hemachandra (Group 4)
- Keka Ghoshal (Group 4)
- Raktima Mukherjee (Group 1)
- Vishwas Rai (Group 1)
- V. Hemabindu (Group 2) -- eliminated 09/09/2005
- Vishwanath Batunge (Group 3) -- eliminated 08/19/2005

Jatin–Lalit's group was the Dum Gharana, consisting of:

- Swananda Karmarkar (Group 2)
- Ujjaini Mukherjee (Group 3)
- Sharib Sabri (Group 3)
- Sanchali Chatterjee (Group 4)
- Abhijeet Ghoshal (Group 4)
- Bhumik Shah (Group 2) -- eliminated 08/12/2005
- Manjeera Ganguly (Group 1) -- eliminated 09/02/2005
- Saptak Bhattacharjee (Group 1) -- eliminated 08/05/2005

Ismail Darbar's group was the Yalgaar Ho Gharana, consisting of:

- Twinkle Bajpai (Group 2)
- Niladri Debnath (Group 2)
- Mohammed Irfan (Group 3)
- Nihira Joshi (Group 1)
- Debojit Saha (Group 1)
- Anindita Sarkar (Group 3) -- eliminated 08/19/2005
- Vineeta Punn (Group 4) -- eliminated 09/23/2005
- Paresh Madhaparia (Group 4) -- eliminated 09/23/2005

==== Episode 3 ====
The judges for this week were Shiv-Hari, the music duo consisting of Shivkumar Sharma and Hariprasad Chaurasia.

The Jai Mata Di Let's Rock gharana went first, with Nanu and Supriya performing. Next was Jai Ho, with Vishwas and Raktima representing. Yalgaar Ho was represented by Debojit and Nihira, with Saptak and Manjeera performing for Dum.

Nihira and Vishwas got green cards, while the rest were all given yellow cards.

==== Episode 4 ====
The yellow card-holders would have to face off against each other. Four would get green cards, while the two who got red cards were eliminated.

Nanu, Supriya, Raktima, Debojit, Saptak, and Manjeera all performed.

Shiv-Hari, the judges for this week, gave the verdict that Saptak and Supriya would be eliminated. Saptak, in particular, was very sad and cried profusely in reaction to his elimination.

==== Episode 5 ====
The judges this show were Alka Yagnik and Jagjit Singh.

Swananda and Bhumik sang for Dum, Banjyotsna and Dilshad for Jai Mata Di Let's Rock, Twinkle and Niladri for Yalgaar Ho, and Hemabindu and Rajeev for Jai Ho. Swananda and Dilshad were given green cards, while Bhumik, Banjyotsna, Twinkle, Niladri, Hemabindu, and Rajeev were all given yellow cards.

==== Episode 6 ====
Bhumik, Banjyotsna, Rajeev, Niladri, Twinkle, and Hemabindu, who got yellow cards yesterday, competed to save themselves from elimination.

Alka Yagnik stated that Twinkle took up the challenge well. She also said that Hemabindu has got some pronunciation problems and that she should work on them. As a result, the first green card went to Twinkle. Since Banjyotsna was not up to the mark, the second green card went to Hemabindu. Among the boys, Jagjit Singh mentioned that the choice of songs was very good and it was a very difficult decision. Niladri got the green card as he had sung well, but there was a tie between Rajeev and Bhumik. Both sang songs of their choice, as they could not arrive at one common song. Eventually, Rajeev got the green card.

Rajeev, Niladri, Twikle and Hemabindu moved to the next level. Bhumik and Banjyotsna were eliminated.

==== Episode 7 ====
Today's judges were Shiv-Hari once again.

Ujjaini and Sharib performed for Dum, Joyeeta and Vineet for Jai Mata Di Let's Rock, Anindita and Irfan for Yalgaar Ho, and Himani and Vishwanath for Jai Ho. Vineet and Himani were shown green cards, while Ujjaini, Sharib, Joyeeta, Anindita, Irfan, and Vishwanath were shown yellow cards and would compete in the next episode—the elimination episode.

==== Episode 8 ====
Today, Ujjaini, Sharib, Joyeeta, Anindita, Irfan, and Vishwanath—all the yellow cardholders from yesterday—competed to avoid elimination.

Sharib was shown the first green card and was safe. The next green card went to Irfan, who was also safe. As a result of this, Vishwanath was eliminated from the competition.

Ujjaini was given the first green card due to the judges saying that she had a playback-style performance in today's round. Joyeeta was given the second green card. Anindita was eliminated.

==== Episode 9 ====
The judges for this week were Alka Yagnik and Jagjit Singh once more.

The last two contestants from each gharana performed today. From Dum, Abhijeet and Sanchali performed, Keka and Hemachandra for Jai Ho, Paresh and Vineeta from Yalgaar Ho, and Aishwarya and Priyani from Jai Mata Di Let's Rock.

For the boys, Abhijeet came very close to a green card, but the judges showed it to Hemachandra instead. Sanchali got the green card from the judges for the girls. Along with Abhijeet, Keka, Paresh, Vineeta, Aishwarya, and Priyani all got yellow cards and competed in the elimination round that Friday.

==== Episode 10 ====
Today, the yellow card-getters from yesterday competed to see who would get a red card (elimination card).

Among the girls, Keka was shown the green card. Among the two remaining competitors, Alka said that Vineeta had a powerful voice but it was evident that she was very tense and nervous, and that Priyani's throw needs to be improved. Vineeta was shown the green card, and Priyani was eliminated.

Among the boys, Alka said that there was no doubt in showing Abhijeet the green card. According to her, the contest was looking at playback singers and Abhijeet was suited for that. Jagjit differed and said that the contest was for singers but since Abhijeet had performed well, the contest was between Paresh and Aishwarya. Ismail and Himesh were furious and said that this was not fair. Himesh said that Aishwarya had been singing with a bad cough. Lalit interrupted them, saying that everybody is unwell because of the pressure and that should not be the point, pointing out that Abhijeet had a fever. They decided that Paresh and Aishwarya will sing one song together, and that Jatin–Lalit and Aadesh will decide who gets the green card. Himesh and Ismail continued to protest Abhijeet's choice in vain, however. Aadesh and Jatin felt Paresh was the better singer. Lalit differed but since the two had chosen Paresh, Alka showed green card to Paresh, eliminating Aishwarya. Ismail was happy but Himesh was very upset.

==== Episode 11 ====
The second round of eliminations began today. The judges were Shiv-Hari.

Nanu, Vishwas, and Debojit competed for the boys while Raktima, Nihira, and Manjeera competed for the girls.

Nihira and Vishwas were shown green cards.

==== Episode 12 ====
Today was an elimination day for the Group 1.

There were two rounds, where everyone would sing a solo song, and then in the second round, the boys would do a duet and the girls would do a duet.

There were some disagreements between the mentors. Jatin–Lalit were not impressed with Debojit's pronunciation, Ismail said Debojit was better, Himesh refused to comment as he is too close to the song, and Aadesh thought Debojit used his experience better but Nanu brought in his innocence to the song.

Jatin–Lalit mentioned that Raktima forgot some lines. Aadesh responded, pointing out that Manjeera messed up the taal, which he said was the basis of any song. Jatin–Lalit said that Manjeera had the disadvantage of starting first and that Raktima came in when the tempo was already set, but Aadesh said that this can't be the excuse after several practices. There was a small fight over this issue.

Among the girls, Manjeera got the red card, and Raktima could not stop crying. Her mother had taken ill after the last performance, when Raktima got a yellow card. Among the boys, Debojit was shown the green card, but Nanu was promised a song in Himesh's next album. As of 2017, Nanu has not been seen performing with Himesh.

==== Episode 13 ====
The second group of contestants performed today—Dilshad, Swananda, Niladri, Twinkle, Rajeev, and Hemabindu.

For Dilshad's performance, Aadesh said that there was a problem in the antara, but the feel of the song was good. Jatin–Lalit commented on the wrong wording used (Lalit said that since he remembers all these songs, he always notices if there is any error in the words). Jatin said that he sang well. Ismail said that in the antara there was a problem.

For Swananda's performance, Ismail said that it seems Swananda is singing for her husband (he was in the UK) and that she sang very well. Himesh said that she had a very good feel. Aadesh said the voice is very clear and very good. The mentors said that this way the nights will be longer and she should call her husband here itself (since she has a long way to go in this competition). Jatin also pointed out that Swananda is Maharashtrian like Lata Mangeshkar.

Himesh said Niladri is very smart as he started and stopped twice. He found Twinkle very good. Jatin–Lalit felt that Ismail is very smart, as he had told his contestant about this as well and stated that they should probably learn from him. They also found Twinkle good in what they said was a difficult song.

Jatin–Lalit said that Rajeev was very good. Himesh felt that Hemabindu was not very good, and Ismail felt that she did not touch his heart, saying something is lacking. Ismail said that Rajeev has got a very strong voice and felt that with training it will be wonderful. He said that he will make him sing in his next movie. Aadesh said that Rajeev is singing for his movie Chingaari.

Rajeev and Twinkle got the green cards.

==== Episode 14 ====
Today was the second elimination day for Group 2.

While Aadesh said that Swananda sang very well, Himesh said that there was extraordinary improvement and she was close to recording quality. Ismail said that she sang the antara beautifully and said it was a very good performance.

After Hemabindu's performance, Jatin–Lalit said that there was tremendous improvement. Himesh said she sounded very fresh and Ismail felt that Hemabindu was much better than earlier times.

Himesh said that Niladri was superb, fantastic, extraordinary. Jatin–Lalit said that there was a good emotional display and that Ismail is working hard on his singers. Aadesh said that Niladri sang well and with heart.

Ismail said Dilshad sang from the heart and chose a very difficult song. Jatin–Lalit said that he rocked, and that among all the contestants his pronunciation was good. Aadesh said that it was a good performance.

In the second round, Aadesh said that Niladri copied the original singer, while Dilshad sang it better. Jatin–Lalit said that both of them were very good, and that Dilshad had a very good feel. Himesh felt that Dilshad was superior to Niladri. Ismail said that Niladri sang better than the original, and Dilshad sang it in his own style. Hemabindu had many pronunciation problems and Swananda sang well, but did not have as much emotion as would've been hoped.

Dilshad and Hemabindu were given red cards and were eliminated as a result.

==== Episode 15 ====
Group 3 had its second elimination round, with Himani, Ujjaini, Sharib, Joyeeta, Vineet, and Irfan competing. The judges were O.P. Nayyar and Kavita Krishnamurthy.

Ismail said that Himani performed well, saying that Aadesh has good singers and he is looking at them carefully. Himesh said that Himani is a very strong contender and her performance today was very good and strong. Jatin–Lalit pointed out that there were some pronunciation problems, but said, overall it was a good performance. Aadesh replied, back saying that in today's time, people get away with singing ta instead of singing tha (referring to Pyar To Hona Hi Tha, a Jatin–Lalit composition).

Aadesh felt that there was good feel in Irfan's antara. Lalit said Irfan had improved much and Ismail is working hard but said that he was wondering initially, when the song started, whose version he was singing. It sounded like Rafi's, but when he yodeled it was clear that it was Kishore's. Overall, it was a good performance where he combined both versions. Himesh praised him a lot, said he was a very good singer, and that he put his life in the song, and he thought it was not fair to compare him with legends like Rafi and Kishore, but in his own way he was very good. Jatin interrupted, saying that none of them here are so foolish to compare any of these singers with Kishore or Rafi but when somebody sings their song, obviously the reference would be those old songs. Himesh apologized for those remarks.

Ismail praised Ujjaini and said she got engrossed in the song, praising Jatin–Lalit for a very good job. On Sharib, he said that he tried, but Rafi had sung it beautifully and he could not manage that. Himesh said that Ujjaini sang much better than earlier, and that Sharib chose a song that was not of his genre but did well. Aadesh said that Sharib was a surprise, his song was not of his style but he sang well. He praised Ujjaini's voice and said she sounds very fresh and thought her tonal quality is the best.

Aadesh said that Joyeeta's was a very simple song where there is hardly any possibility of an error, but she made those and was off target from the very beginning. He liked Vineet's performance. Jatin–Lalit liked Vineet's performance. Jatin was very disappointed with Joyeeta, and said that he is not too sure whether he should say anything because she is very sensitive and takes everything to heart and cries, but he decided that he should say. He sang another song- two version and said that in the second version of his singing it is the same song but with different feeling it sounds like a beggar's song. He was probably trying to say that proper feel of song is very important and if it not there, the song loses everything. Ismail congratulated Himesh for choosing a song which is not suited to Joyeeta's voice, so considering that, he said she sang well. Himesh thought Vineet did not do his best, but sang well. As for Joyeeta, he said that she should not take the mentors' comments personally as they all consider her like their daughter and expect a lot from her and want her to improve.

The green cards went to Vineet and Himani.

==== Episode 16 ====
Today was the elimination day for Group 3. O.P. Nayyar and Kavita Krishnamurthy were the judges once more.

Irfan was widely praised by all of the judges. Ujjaini was also widely praised, with Aadesh saying she was a possible threat to Nihira. Jatin–Lalit said that the credit for this performance goes to Ujjaini completely, as they had picked a different song for her, and she had picked her own. With Sharib, the decision became a tough one for the boys, with Jatin saying that perhaps both Irfan and Sharib should be shown green cards today.

Joyeeta's performance was a controversial one, with Aadesh saying it was merely mediocre, calling himself more of a "filmi" guy. Ismail said he considered himself a "classical" musician, and he found it exceptional from that angle. A big fight between the judges ensued after this, stalling shooting and cancelling the second round of the elimination as a result. Aadesh initially said he would quit the show after this, but later said that he would return for his students.

All four were given green cards and nobody was eliminated, as the mentors were busy fighting amongst themselves and were asked to leave the shooting so they could announce results.

==== Episode 17 ====
Group 4 (Vineeta, Paresh, Hemachandra, Keka, Sanchari, and Abhijeet) had its second elimination today. Kavita Krishnamurthy returned as a judge, and was joined by Suresh Wadkar.

All the mentors spoke to Paresh in Punjabi to try and confuse him (he doesn't speak Hindi, he speaks a little Gujarati and mostly English, being born and raised in the UK). Nobody said anything about his singing, however. With Vineeta, everyone focused on her improvement as a singer.

Ismail focused on Hemachandra's sister, Hemabindu, being eliminated some weeks ago, and told him to bring more sorrow into his singing during training. The mentors said that he had definitely brought that into his performance. Ismail said he felt like slapping Vineeta after hearing Keka's performance. Jatin brought up that Vineeta was still quite young, while Keka had more experience and was more mature.

The mentors weren't very impressed with Abhijeet or Sanchari, saying that both performances lacked feel and character.

The green cards went to Hemachandra and Keka.

==== Episode 18 ====
Group 4 went through its second elimination. Suresh Wadkar and Sameer were the judges today.

Aadesh said that Abhijeet has proved his mettle—he has sung songs of Yesudas, S.P. Balasubramanyam, Hariharan, and now Sonu Nigam, which says a lot about his singing. He was impressed with his singing and said that this was his best performance. Himesh said that Abhijeet really sang well today. Ismail also praised Abhijeet.

Aadesh did mention about the loss of sur at times but said that he was impressed and Paresh has improved a lot. Lalit felt that with this, the mahayudh has begun (meaning that both of them have sung well and so it will be very close). Himesh also liked Paresh's performance.

Himesh said that Vineeta's voice was today's generation's voice and can suit playback perfectly. The other mentors also felt that Vineeta's performance was good, although she did falter in some places but said it was overall quite good.

The mentors praised Sanchari for handling a song that was quite difficult well.

In the second round, Himesh said that Abhijeet has complicated the matter again, as he sang very well in the first round but sang badly in the second. The judges pointed out that Vineeta lost her sur quite often, and couldn't maintain herself at all during that song.

Abhijeet and Sanchari got green cards, and Paresh and Vineeta got red cards and were eliminated.

==== Episode 19 ====
The third round of eliminations began today. The judges were Pandit Jasraj, the uncle of Dum's mentors Jatin–Lalit, and Daler Mehndi.

Today was Lata Mangeshkar's birthday, and so the contestants paid tribute to her by performing her songs.

Jatin–Lalit said that Keka initially used to sing Richa Sharma-style songs but now Aadesh has changed her voice completely (it was meant as a compliment). He said that Aadesh has certainly worked very hard in moulding both the singers. The others were not very impressed but said that it was OK.

Jatin–Lalit said that Nihira did not perform that well because they all have a lot of expectations from her. Everybody was of the opinion that Irfan was good.

Ismail praised Vineet for his improvisations, which got Jatin in action, saying that the contestants should try to sing the song properly first and then try improvisation. A small fight broke off but was edited out of the show. Jatin told Himesh that he should give a break to Vineet and tell all of them the date—all of them will be happy. Himesh ended by saying "Aashiq Banaya Aapne".

Another mini fight—Ismail said that Ujjaini did not pick up the song properly, and Jatin claiming that Ujjaini sang perfectly. Jatin claimed that Ujjaini sang better than Nihira today, and Ismail asked why the two were being compared.

The judges said that the competition was very good. Daler Mehndi said that they should not try to copy Lata or Asha and that they did not copy anybody. Jasraj differed, saying that all of them had copied at some point, pointing out that even Lata, in her initial days, copied Shamshad Begum and Noorjahan. It is by following these great singers that one can learn and pass on the heritage. Daler, luckily, did not fight, and said that contestants should follow these great singers but evolve your own identity, targeted at Keka. For Ujjaini, he said that she sang well, but should concentrate more. For Nihira, he said that she should work on her body language which seems like she is the only one good here.

For the boys, he said that Vishwas is very good and has got good talent, which will take him far. For Vineet, he said that there is a little problem but was very vague.

Nihira and Vineet got green cards. Nihira did mention that she will work on her body language if it was creating a misunderstanding. Daler interrupted, saying that if there was a misunderstanding, they would have chosen Ujjaini. Keka chose the yellow card herself, saying that she did not sing well and will try to be better tomorrow. Ujjaini said that Nihira deserved it today.

Vishwas said that he was looking for a hattrick, but he is happy because his younger brother has won. Vineet was asked by Himesh not to become proud and be a good human being. He started crying, saying that he was under lot of stress for the last three days. When asked why, Vishwas said that they are very close and since the day Vineet found out that he has to compete with his big brother, he has been upset. Jasraj jokingly mentioned that then he should have sung really badly.

==== Episode 20 ====
Pandit Jasraj and Daler Mehndi returned to judge today.

The theme was songs by Jatin–Lalit, the mentors of the Dum gharana.

Vishwas, Keka, Irfaan, and Ujjaini competed to save themselves from elimination.

From the third round of eliminations, there will be a blue card, as well as a red card. The blue card will force a contestant to compete in a "Chakraviuh"—a semi-final among all the blue cardholders. 2 of the Top 12 will be selected through the Chakraviuh, and the other 2 will be done through a Brahmastra—wildcard entry.

Ismail said that Vishwas did not pick up the song properly, but got hold of it later and then sang it well. Jatin–Lalit refused to comment, saying that it is their song and that is why they can see many faults, but overall he sang well. Himesh refused to comment saying if Jatin–Lalit don't want to comment, he should also not say anything.

Aadesh told both of his students that he wants them to win only if they deserve it, and if at any point they think that they have picked up the song and are given green cards, they should not take it, and on the other hand, if they think that they have sung better than the others, don't say that the other one deserved it. Keka said that this is the reason why she, when asked yesterday, had said that she deserved yellow. Aadesh did point out that her voice is not ok and she is sick but he is not saying this as excuse.

Ismail said that we should acknowledge Jatin–Lalit for giving us this wonderful song, and incidentally he had played violin in this particular composition. He said that considering Keka's limitation with her voice, she tried well. Jatin–Lalit also felt that the effort was good.

Jatin–Lalit said that in only two stanzas, Irfan had created an atmosphere which is not easy. Aadesh said that Irfan has sung wonderfully and was the best that day. Lalit said that Irfan was very hardworking and told Ismail that soon they will sending our singer to him to get trained (Irfan was sent to Lalit for training for this song by Ismail).

Most mentors enjoyed Ujjaini's performance.

Ismail said that he hopes Jatin–Lalit keep on creating such wonderful music all their life. Most of the mentors were refusing to comment, saying when they have extremely qualified guest judges, they should leave it for them.

Irfan was shown the blue card, and Vishwas got a red card. Vishwas had already requested his teammates not to cry if he lost. He said that his gharana was still there and Hemachandra and Rajeev will take it to the final and would win it. He said that if God is willing he would come back.

There was a tie between Keka and Ujjaini. They were asked to sing their own song's antara again. Daler said that Keka slipped on sur 5 times and Ujjaini 8 times. He said that Keka can do very well on stage, and Ujjaini will be very good in a recording atmosphere. The blue card went to Keka, and Ujjaini got the red card. Aadesh pointed out that Ujjaini has already sung for him and it is 99% final and if mata rani is willing even that 1% will be final. Ujjaini was crying because she had dropped a year in studies to come here and not chosen science stream even though she had good marks because she wanted to be a singer. Daler said that music is the right choice and she will certainly go far. Keka said that she did not know what to say as she was close to Ujjaini, they live near each other in Calcutta and shared a room at the show.

=== Final 12 ===
From the final 12 onwards, week after week, after entertaining audiences from around the world with some fantastic music, singer by singer got eliminated due to a lack of votes from the public.

The final 12 in order of winning with their Gharana:

- Debojit Saha (Yalgaar Ho) - Winner
- Vineet Singh (Jai Mata Di Let's Rock) - 1st Runner up
- Vedala Hemachandra (Jai Ho) - 2nd Runner Up
- Himani Kapoor (Jai Ho) - 3rd Runner Up
- Nihira Joshi (Yalgaar Ho)- 4th Runner Up
- Paresh Madhaparia (Jai Mata Di Let's Rock)
- Ujjaini Mukherjee (Jai Mata Di Let's Rock)
- Twinkle Bajpai (Yalgaar Ho)
- Rajeev Kumar (Jai Ho)
- Sharib Sabri (Dum)
- Swananda Karmarkar (Dum)
- Raktima Mukherjee (Jai Ho)

== Cast ==
- Shaan- host
- Jatin–Lalit- themselves (Dum)
- Aadesh Shrivastava- himself (Jai Ho)
- Himesh Reshammiya- himself (Jai Mata Di Let's Rock)
- Ismail Darbar- himself (Yalgaar Ho)
