= Shovan =

Indian playback singer

Shovan Ganguly শোভন গাঙ্গুলী
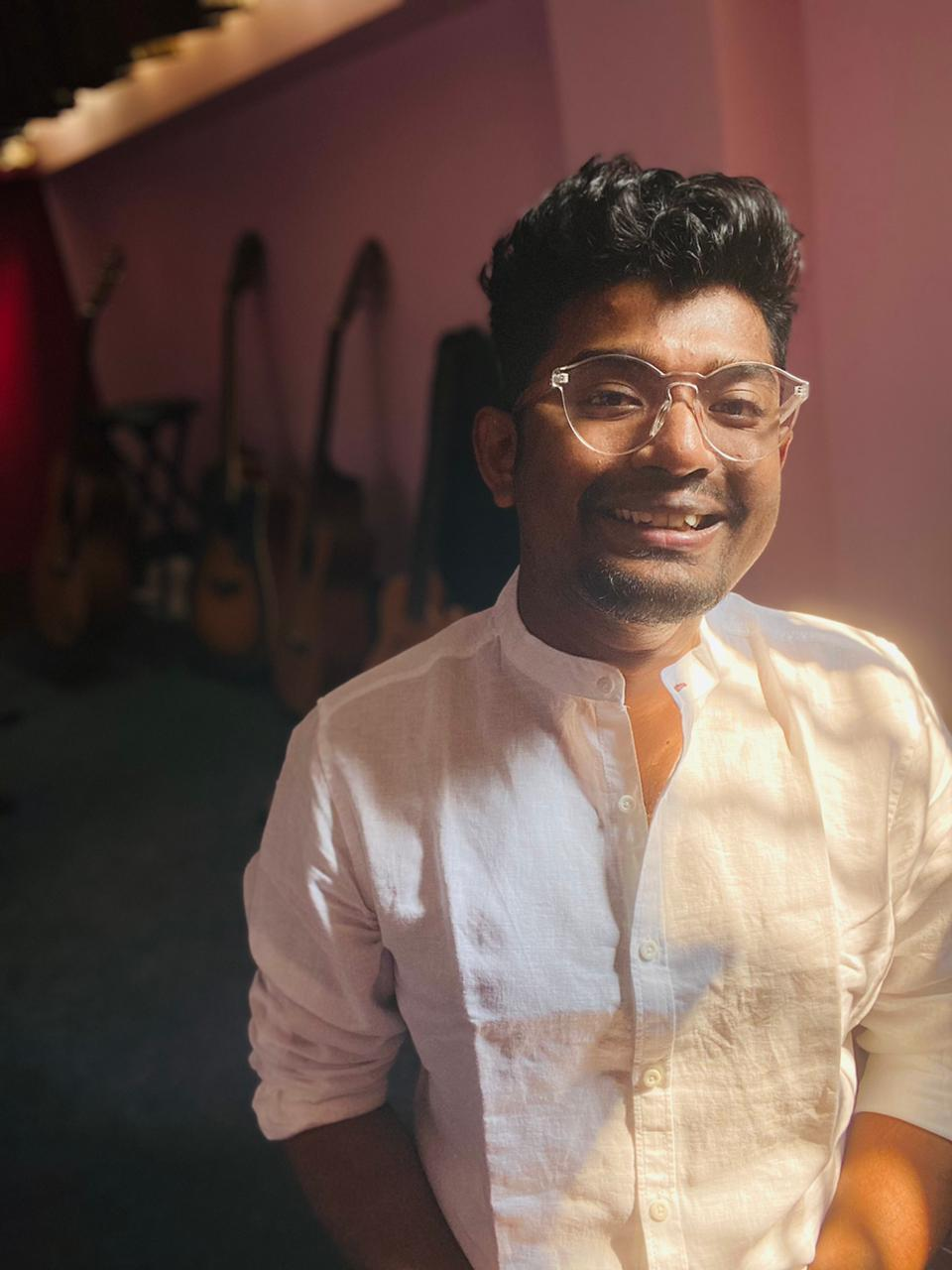
- Ganguly in February 2021

Background information
- Born: Shovan Ganguly
- Origin: Kolkata, West Bengal, India
- Genres: World
- Occupations: Music composer, singer, lyricist
- Instruments: Guitar; Harmonium; Piano
- Years active: 2011–present
- Labels: Asha Audio; Amara Muzik

Shovan Ganguly is a singer from West Bengal. He was the winner of Zee Bangla Sa Re Ga Ma Pa. He also participated in X-Factor in 2011, reaching the top 12. His most recent song is "Daaknaam". The song was released in 2021.

== TV series ==
Year	Title	Role	Channel	Notes
	Didi No 1	Himself	Zee Bangla	
	Dadagiri	Himself	Zee Bangla	

== Reality shows ==
Year	Title	Role	Note
2021	Super Singer season 3	Himself	Mentor

== Discography ==
=== As singer ===
Film	Song	Label	Reference(s)
Asur	Radha	Grassroot Entertainment	
Arshinagar	Jaan Qubool		
