= Timir Biswas =

Indian musician

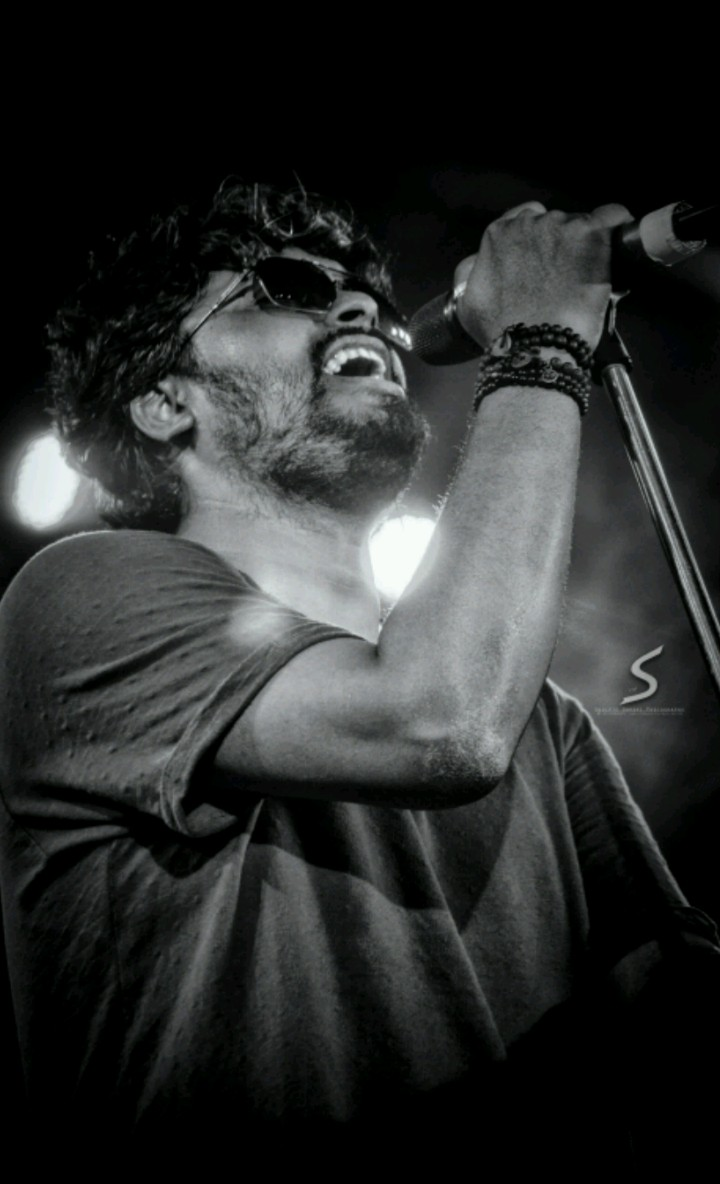
- Timir Biswas live at EIEM College.

Background information
- Also known as: Tublu
- Born: 20 November 1982 (age 43)
- Origin: Asansol, West Bengal, India
- Genres: Folk, folk fusion, rock, experimental, Easy Listening, Sufi Rock, Pop rock, Alternative Rock
- Occupations: Singer; Songwriter; Composer; Music Director; Director; Writer; Film Maker
- Years active: 2007 – present
- Website: timirbiswas.com & fakiramusic.com

Timir Biswas (Bengali: তিমির বিশ্বাস; born 20 November 1982) is an Indian playback singer of both Bengali and Hindi films. He also the lead singer of the band Fakira. He originates from Sreepally, Asansol, West Bengal and belongs to a Bengali family.

== Early life ==
Timir was born on 20 November 1982 to parents Swapan Biswas and Sukla Biswas. His father Swapan Biswas is a theatre actor and a bank employee. Timir completed his education from Subhas Pally Vidya Niketan and then joined Raghunathpur College, Purulia with economics.

Timir has never had any formal training in music. When he was four to five years old he used to sing the ad jingles shown on television. On seeing this his mother took him to her Guruji, but Timir's singing was not encouraged. It was said that he could never sing with such a voice.

Then on the first day of college, he first sang publicly when he was asked to do so by some of his seniors. Everyone liked it. And then this became a daily routine. From then he started singing. He has learnt music by listening to songs. He used to go to many music persons with his compositions and lyrics but no one encouraged him. Then he opened a gig for a concert of Nachiketa Chakraborty. His performance was praised by Nachiketa. Then he formed and joined the band Muzik Street. After few small gigs, they were selected for Band-e-mataram. Chandrabindoo's Anindya and Upal were the mentor of Muzik Street in the event. Later Upal called up Timir to sing for the film 033. Since then, he took up music as a profession.

== Muzik Street ==
Timir was one of the founding members of the Asansol-based band Muzik Street. He initially played the keyboard, and later as a vocalist. Later he left the band and shifted to Kolkata. Muzik Street brought the band revolution in Asansol. Timir, for his unique voice, was noticed by several music directors. It was during this time that he did his first solo playback under the music direction of Chandrabindoo for the song "Onnyo Kothao Chol" of the movie 033. Later he achieved wide fame and popularity when under the music direction of Jeet Ganguly, he along with Rana Mazumdar sang the title track of the movie "Dui Prithibi". Thereafter he received numerous offers for playback.

== Fakira ==
After leaving Muzik Street, Timir shifted to Kolkata owing to the various offers for playback and other solo works as it was difficult for him to continue working from Asansol. There he met with one of his friend from Asansol, guitarist, composer and a member of the band Desh, Chayan Chakraborty. Their alike interest in Folk Music led them into working more with folk songs. Gradually Abhinaba, Kunaal and the famous percussionist, drummer Bunty joined them to form the band Fakira. They are currently working with Bengali folks and has plans to work on root music round the globe.

The current line up is:

Fakira at Air Wick Phono Live Studio Concert at ETV Bangladesh

- Timir Biswas: Vocals and Keyboard
- Chayan Chakraborty: Guitar and Backing Vocals
- Apurba Das: Guitar
- Kunaal Biswas: Bass and Backing Vocals
- Avirup Das (Bunty): Drums and Percussion

After visiting various ashrams and akhras they have started their research in folk songs and have blended them with elements of rock. Some of their folk arrangements has already gained immense popularity online. Some of them are Chander Gaye Chand, Nizamuddin Auliya, Tyangra, Golemale Pirit, Somoy Gele Shadhon, and Bhromor Koyo Giya. They have toured Bangladesh to feature in an Eid Special 4-hour-long episode of Air Wick Phono Live Studio Concert in ETV. Other than this they have performed at various college fests and other notable social events. Timir, Chayan and Abhinaba have also worked for music of the 4th Bell Theaters production 15 Minutes To Fame & Nobel Chor. In 2013 October, Fakira went international and performed at Hartford, Columbus, Tampa and Chicago.

In July 2015, Fakira featured in Caller Gaan in Desh TV, a popular TV channel of Bangladesh.

=== Itorpona ===
Fakira released their debut album Itorpona on 6 September 2014 at Story, Elgin Road, Kolkata marked by the gracious presence of Sayani Datta, Sujoyprasad Chattopadhyay, Satrajit Sen, Aakash Fakir and Armaan Fakir. The album released under the banner of Inreco and Major 7th consists of 8 tracks written by Lalon Fakir, Radharomon, Hasan and others. The song titled Somoy Gele Shadhon is a tribute to Pink Floyd and is a bridge between Lalon and Pink Floyd. Itorpona has won the Special Jury Award in Mirchi Music Awards Bangla, 2015. The album contains the following tracks:

1. Bhromor Koyo Giya
2. Paal Tule De
3. Itorpona
4. Somoy Gele Shadhon
5. Chander Gaye Chand Legeche
6. Nizammuddin Auliya
7. Opaar
8. Sob Loke Koy Lalon

=== Hare Krishno ===
The band has recently announced on social media that they have started working on their second album which is to be titled Hare Krishno. Recordings have reportedly begun for the album at Yash Raj Film Studios Mumbai.

Also, the band is coming up with two singles - Krishno Premer Pora Deho and Ami Shudhu Roinu baki which will be releasing soon. As per the band, the recordings have been done. As of now, the post production works are being carried out.

== Playback & Television ==
Timir with director Raj Chakraborty

Timir because of his unique quality of voice, was noted by music directors quite early. Jeet Ganguly in an interview said that Timir is the Bryan Adams of Bengal. After "onnyo kothao chol" from 033, music by Chandrabindoo and "Dui Prithibi" from Dui Prithibi, Music by Jeet Ganguly, Timir has also sung for music directors like Indradeep Dasgupta, Joy Sarkar. He has recently made his Bollywood debut in the film 'Khajoor Pe Atke' directed by Harsh Chhaya.

Timir Biswas has also been featured in Zee Bangla Cinema Song connection and has been accredited for the maximum number of songs in the show.

== Timir Biswas Live (TBL) ==
On 17 June 2015 Timir for the first time went solo on stage. On the eve of the anniversary celebration of 4th Bell Theaters, the theatre group organized the show Timir Biswas Live (TBL) at Gyan Manch. It was the first time where Timir performed his playback numbers live in a concert. The show witnessed many popular faces of the Bengali film and music industry viz. Chaitali Dasgupta, Ujjaini, Satadal and Gabu. Praises showered in for Timir post the show. Henceforth TBL has been immensely popular and has performed in numerous concerts in college fests etc.

Timir Biswas Live features:

- Timir Biswas - Vocals & Guitar
- Chayan Chakraborty - Lead Guitar
- Sagar Chatterjee - Lead Guitar
- Mohul Chakraborty (Dodo) - Bass Guitar
- Rahul - Keyboard
- Appu - Drums

== Ondho Premik ==
Timir, after posting a series of 17 social media posts containing couplets of lyrics, announced that Ondho Premik his first Solo album would be coming soon to the audience. On 3 August, Timir revealed the details about the album on social media. Ondho Premik as cited by Timir is supposed to contain 6 love stories in form of 6 songs. The lyrics are penned by Rajib Chakraborty. Ashu-Abhishek composed the music for the album.

Ashu-Abhishek (a well known music director duo) and Timir have known each other for four years and have worked on various projects including Zee Bangla Song Connection, but almost all of them were client based. However, all of them had an urge to work on an album independently, with their own understanding and expression of music. However, things kept on getting pushed and nothing was actually taking shape. They had initially arranged many sittings to discuss the same, but little did anything fruitful turn out.

The entire team of Ondho Premik first collaborated for the show Poetry on Celluloid hosted by popular Kolkata RJ Raja Das. They created a song titled Bhalobashar Jawr (penned by Rajib Chakraborty) for that show. With this song, they realized that Bhalobashar Jawr was the kind of songs that they actually wanted to work on. With this, the decision to work on an album together, was taken unanimously. They decided to meet at Rajib's place.

As usual, like the earlier meetings, Ashu and Timir were not aware of what was going to take shape from this meeting. Abhishek was out of town during this meeting. However, at the meeting they learned that Rajib has already written eight songs for the album and all of them were production-ready content. At this point of time, other members of the team became serious and work on the album began.

Yet Ondho Premik was not progressing ahead as Ashu-Abhishek were stuck in their other projects. Finally one fine night, accompanied by heavy downpour, the duo created the first track of the album Bandhobi Mon. Henceforth, after various sittings, planning, etc. the team finally hit the studios on 25 August 2016 and finished recording on 6 September 2016. The Drums have been played by a friend of Ashu, Vinayak Mahadevan and was recorded by Jonathan at The Sound House Studio in California. The album was recorded at Sonic Solutions (vocals) and Post Production (music), Kolkata. The album was mixed by a friend of Timir, Shubhodeep, in Mumbai.

The album released (first time for a Bengali album to pre-release on digital media) on digital platforms on 15 October 2016 through a Facebook live session. The album (released by Inreco) release would be held at Princeton Club on 27 October accompanied by a special performance by Fakira. The album consists of the following six tracks:

1. Chole Bole Koushole
2. Ondho Premik
3. Bandhobimon
4. Niruddesh
5. Bhalobashar Jwor
6. Ekshow Aath

On 19 November 2016 the Music video for Ondho Premik was released on YouTube by Indian Records Video Channel. The video, produced in association with the 4th Bell Theaters, has already garnered more than 50,000 views. The video directed by Aniruddha Dasgupta and edited and colored by Alok Chowdhury, features Timir, Ashu, Abhishek, Rajib, Chayan, Sagar, Prarthita, Mahua, Aritra, Ritwick, Satyaki, Asim, Shreya, Dipanwita and Kallol. The post production activities were carried out by Kolkata Videos.

== YouTube Covers ==
Timir featured in a number of covers which released on YouTube under the banners of Kolkata Videos HD, 12 Keys Studio etc. His first cover of the song Pyar Deewana Hota Hai from film Kati Patang was released in 2014 by Kolkata Videos HD. The video was eventually re-released by Saregama India Ltd. Hindi music channel "Saregama GenY". Other covers include Iktara (12 Keys Studio), O meri Jaan (12 Keys Studio), Ei meghla dine ekla (Kolkata Videos HD), etc.

== Director and Story Teller ==
The knack of story telling lingered within Timir since his childhood days. According to Timir, his inspiration for storytelling is his father. Timir ventured into Direction and Story Telling with the musical short film Kichudin - a song penned by Soumik Das (who also happens to be the DOP for the film) and sung by Timir. Kichudin talks about love and life in old age homes. Timir's father Swapan Biswas plays a pivotal role in the film.

Following the success of Kichudin, Timir directed another music video/ musical short film for a cover version of the Rabinra Sangeet Tumi Robe Nirobe sung by Timir himself with Rahul Sarkar on the Keys. The entire footage for the film was shot on Timir's iPhone while the band was in Jalpaiguri.

Timir's third venture is the Musical Short Film for the song Ami Jani Tumi Thik by the band Bad Trip. Timir has written the story and directed film. The film talks about getting over our mistakes and starting out afresh. Timir's father Swapan Biswas has played the role of the protagonists father in the film.

== Theater ==
Timir's father Swapan Biswas has been associated with theater for more than 35 years. He has performed in numerous shows in Asansol and various parts of West Bengal, Delhi etc. Timir, watching his father perform was intrigued by this form of art and had developed a liking for the art as early as his toddler age. Timir too has been associated with theater and stage plays since his childhood. Timir is associated with one of the most famous theater groups of Kolkata, called 4th Bell Theaters for more than 4 years. For numerous plays viz. Noble Chor, 15 Minutes to Fame, Fan staged by the group, Timir has been an active member in producing the music. Timir has also performed on stage for many of the plays.

== Discography ==
Director

Film	Song Credits
Kichudin	Timir Biswas and Soumik Das
Tumi Robe Nirobe	Timir Biswas and Rahul Sarkar
Chorono Dhorite	Timir Biswas and Rahul Sarkar
Ami Jani Tumi Thik	Bad Trip
Ebhabe Amay	Timir Biswas & Srija Mandal
Sedin Dujone	Timir Biswas
Pushpa: The Rule	Timir Biswas

Muzik Street

Song name	Movie/Band	Music By
Ajo Mon	Muzik Street	Muzik Street
Brishti Bheja	Muzik Street	Muzik Street
Chal Aaj	Muzik Street	Muzik Street
9/11	Muzik Street	Muzik Street
Amar Gaan	Muzik Street	Muzik Street
Moni Da	Muzik Street	Muzik Street

Fakira (Live)

Song name	Movie/Band	Music By
Chander Gaye Chand Legeche	Fakira	Fakira
Bhromor Koyo Giya	Fakira	Fakira
Golemale Pirit	Fakira	Fakira
Nizamuddin Auliya	Fakira	Fakira
Tyangra	Fakira	Fakira
Shomoy Gele Shadhon	Fakira	Fakira
Sob Loke Koy Lalon	Fakira	Fakira
Itorpona	Fakira	Fakira
Bhojibo Tomar Ranga Charan	Fakira	Fakira
Hare Krishna	Fakira	Fakira
Banka Nodi	Fakira	Fakira
Bangla Qawali	Fakira	Fakira

Playback

Films

Year	Song name	Movie	Music director	Co – Singers
2024	Pushpa Pushpa	Pushpa 2: The Rule	Devi Sri Prasad	Solo
2024	Peelings	Pushpa 2: The Rule	Devi Sri Prasad	
2020	"Danpitey"	Love Story	Savvy	Kuntal De
2019	Mriter Shohor	Zombiestaan	Aviraj Sen	Solo
2019	Toke Chai	Teko	Savvy	Savvy
2019	Katha Chilo Kato	Googly	Prasen	Iman Chakraborty
2019	Ashkara	Buro Sadhu	Pranjal Das	Bumpai Chakraborty
2019	Noyono Tomare	Buro Sadhu	Pranjal Das	Solo
2019	Jole Jhapas Na (Reprise)	Buro Sadhu	Pranjal Das	Solo
2019	Amar Bhul Hoye Geche Priyo	Rajlokhi O Srikanto	Anirban Das	Solo
2019	Amar Etuk Sudhu Chaoa	Rajlokhi O Srikanto	Anirban Das	Solo
2019	Kanu Haramzada	Bhokatta	Dolaan Mainnakk	Solo
2018	Bhanga Mon Bhanga Chand	Asche Abar Shabor	Bickram Ghosh	Iman Chakraborty & Ambarish Das
2018	Aao Na Dekha	Khajoor Pe Atke	Bickram Ghosh	Ujjaini Mukherjee
2018	Kichu Kichu Kotha	Flat No 609	Ratul Shankar	Solo
2018	Inge Laare	Reunion	Joy Sarkar	Rupankar Bagchi & Joy Sarkar
2018	Dhire Dhire	Roshogolla	Harish Sagane	Arnab Dutta & Raj Barman
2017	Shey Ekhon Aar	Black Coffee	Anupam Roy	Anupam Roy
2017	Srabone	Meher Aali	Savvy	Solo
2017	Classi - Folk Medly	Durga Sohay	Bickram Ghosh	Iman Chakraborty
2017	Buro Lamp Post	Khoj	Shunopoka (band)	Solo
2017	Ghawre Pherar Gaan	Michael	Indrajit Dey	Shafqat Amanat Ali
2017	Jak Chole Jak	Michael	Indrajit Dey	Lagnajita
2016	Journey Song	Sangabora	Raja Narayan Deb	Neeti Mohan
2016	Qatl-e-Zulfiqar	Zulfiqar	Anupam Roy	Solo
2016	Eka Ekela Mon	Eka Ekela Mon	Amit Mitra	Solo
2016	Raat Jege	Sarook Se Shahrukh Tak	Saikat Chatt	Solo
2016	Eka Eka	Sarook Se Shahrukh Tak	Saikat Chatt	Solo
2016	Mannat	Sarook Se Shahrukh Tak	Saikat Chatt	Solo
2016	Ekhono She Radharani	D Major	Samik & Kunal	Solo
2016	O Jadugar	D Major	Samik & Kunal	Solo
2016	Untitled Track	Gangster	Arindom	Solo
2016	Jabo Chole	Kanamachi Bho Bho	Orin	Solo
2016	Koto Ki Thaklo Baki	Kuheli	Dolan-Mainak	Solo
2016	Life Goes On	Antarleen	Ratul Shankar	Solo
2016	Bole De Na	Haripada Bandwala	Indraadip Dasgupta	Solo
2015	Khojo Nijeke Bojho	Bodhon	Mayukh Mainak	Solo
2015	Asche Sokal	Lorai	Indradeep Dasgupta	Bonnie Chakraborty
2015	Jekhane Shob Sesh	Lorai	Indradeep Dasgupta	Solo
2015	Journey Song	Fakebook	Sandip Kar	Solo
2015	E buker aagune	Fakebook	Dolon - Mainak	June Banerjee
2015	Ami shudhu cheyechi tomay	Professional (ZEE Bangla Cinema Originals)	Cactus (Original Song)	Solo
2015	Me Amor	Chitra	Mohul	Solo
2015	Khunshuti	Chitra	Mohul	Ujjaini Mukherjee, Mohul
2015	Honey Honey	Bosonto Ese Geche	Samidh	Ujjaini Mukherjee, Samidh
2015	Aaj shomoy oshohay	Not a Dirty Film	Dev Sen	Solo
2015	Hoyto Achi Bager Bhitor	Ebhabeo Phire Asha Jay (ZEE Bangla Cinema Originals)	Abhi Ashu	Solo
2014	Bondhu	The Royal Bengal Tiger	Jeet Ganguly	Solo
2014	Jouno Shukh	Pathghat	Suvam Moitra	Solo
2014	Majhe Majhe	Window Connection	Anupam Roy	Solo
2014	Ekta Manush	Hercules	Neel Dutta	Solo
2014	Prem Nokuldana	Janla Diye Bou Palalo	Savvy	Shreenibas
2014	Police	Force	Saptarshi Mukherjee	Ujjaini Mukherjee
2013	Bhogoban Bhogoban	Bojhena Shey Bojhena	Arindom Chatterjee	Somlata Acharyya Chowdhury
2013	Majhe Majhe	Maach Mishti and More	Neel Dutt	Solo
2013	Mann Bawre	Kanamachi	Indradeep Dasgupta & Rishi Chanda	Arijit Singh, Anwesha Datta Gupta, Ujjwal
2013	Keno Pririti Baraila Re	Phoring	Prabuddha Banerjee	Solo
2013	Aaj Jemon Kore	Phoring	Prabuddha Banerjee	Solo
2013	Aschorjo Prodip	Aschorjo Prodip	Raja Narayan Deb	Rishi Chanda Anupam Roy
2013	Ekta Beporoya Din Ashe	The Play	Joy Sarkar	Somchanda Bhattacharya
2013	Aaj Ke Keno Mon Bhijey Jay	Aagun	Anindya Banerjee	Madhuraa Bhattacharya
2013	Eka Ei Mon Eka Jibon	Aagun	Anindya Banerjee	Solo
2013	Kannar Jolchobi	Aagun	Anindya Banerjee	Rupankar Bagchi
2012	O Ochena	Accident	Joy Sarkar	Solo
2012	Kane Kane	Bicycle Kick	Joy Sarkar	Solo
2011	Dheu e Oi	Ghete Ghaw	Indradeep Dasgupta	Solo
2011	Jaliye Puriye	Shatru	Indradeep Dasgupta	June Banerjee
2010	Onnyo Kothao Chal	033	Chandrabindoo	Solo
2010	Dui Prithibi	Dui Prithibi	Jeet Ganguly	Rana Mazumdar

Television and others

Year	Song name	Serial/Album	Music director	Co – Singers
2017	Sada Kalo Cinema	Coffee FM 2 Baba Tomake	Chayan Chakraborty	Solo
2016	Hocche Sokal	Single	Soumik	Solo
2016	Title Track	Sohagi Sindur (Colours Bangla)	Ashu Abhishek	Ujjaini Mukherjee
2016	Title Track	Phire Ashar Gaan (Star Jalsha)	Chandrashish	Solo
2016	Theme Song	Manush Mela	Kunal Biswas	Kaushik Chakraborty, Laxman Das Baul, Ila Maa
2015	Ichchhe	Sargam Sarbajanin	Chayan Chakraborty	Solo
2014	Oo Nodi Re (Episode 1)	Zee Bangla Cinema Song Connection	Mayukh and Mainakh (Original: Hemanta Mukherjee)	Solo
2014	Aar To Noy Besi Din (Episode 2)	Zee Bangla Cinema Song Connection	Abhishek and Ashu (Original: Music- Ajoy Das, Singer- Kishore Kumar)	Solo
2014	Jemon Sree Radha Kande (Episode 2)	Zee Bangla Cinema Song Connection	Abhishek and Ashu (Original: Shyamal Mitra)	Solo
2014	Halla Rajar Sena (Episode 3)	Zee Bangla Cinema Song Connection	Indradeep Dasgupta (Original: Satyajit Ray)	Solo
2014	O Montri Moshay (Episode 3)	Zee Bangla Cinema Song Connection	Indradeep Dasgupta (Original: Satyajit Ray)	Malabika
2014	O Baghare (Episode 3)	Zee Bangla Cinema Song Connection	Indradeep Dasgupta (Original: Satyajit Ray)	Bonnie
2014	Pagla Hawar Badol Dine (Episode 4)	Zee Bangla Cinema Song Connection	Mayukh and Mainakh (Original: Rabindranath Tagore)	Solo
2012	Track Programming of all songs (along with Chayan and Indranil) & Vocals in: 1. Paye Paye Alo; 2. Neel Ghuri; 3. Kuor Byang; 4. Load Shedding; 5. Ishware Bishwas Nei; 6. Din Chale Dhakka Khay; 7. Hath Barao Khuje Nao	15 Minutes Minutes to Fame by 4th Bell Theaters	Indranil Majumdar	Indranil, Amrita
2012	Josh	Josh (Sananda TV Serial)	Arindom Chatterjee	Rupam Islam
2012	Ghure Geche Din	Josh (Sananda TV Serial)	Arindom Chatterjee	Solo
2012	Kache Peethe Tora	Josh (Sananda TV Serial)	Arindom Chatterjee	Solo
2012	Jeet (Title track)	Jeet (Sananda TV serial)	Jeet Ganguly	Monali Thakur

== Awards ==
Special Award for Nabagato Kantho, 91.9 Friends FM Sangeet Samman 2013

Special Jury Award for Itorpona, Mirchi Music Awards Bangla, 2015
