= Vinchi Bharati Academy =

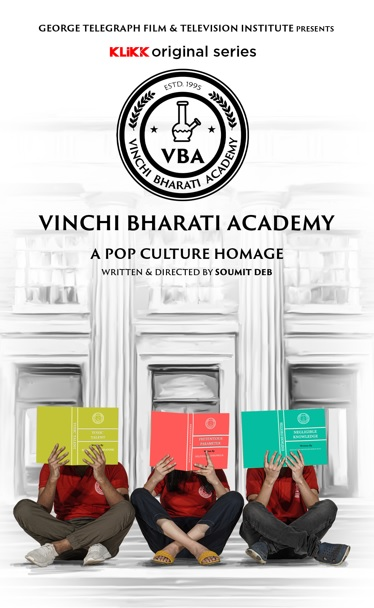
- Genre: Comedy
- Written by: Soumit Deb
- Directed by: Soumit Deb
- Starring: Sreya Bhattacharya, Debraj Bhattacharya, Samadarshi Dutta, Avery Singha Roy, Sabuj Bardhan, Anujoy Chattopadhyay, Deboprasad Halder
- Country of origin: India
- Original language: Bengali
- No. of seasons: 1
- No. of episodes: 6

Production
- Producer: Santanu Chatterjee

Original release
- Release: 24 September 2022

Vinchi Bharati Academy is a 2022 Indian Bengali language comedy drama web series written and directed by Soumit Deb. The main cast in the series are Sreya Bhattacharya, Debraj Bhattacharya, Samadarshi Dutta, Avery Singha Roy, Sabuj Bardhan, Anujoy Chattopadhyay, Deboprasad Halder and Saoli Chattopadhyay. The web series is produced by Santanu Chatterjee under Films and Frames.

== Synopsis ==
Two portions of the story take place in parallel time and space, one in truth and the other in hallucination. Vinchi Bharati Academy is located in delusion, where conventions, culture, way of life, and system are challenged, manipulated, overrated, explained, and symbolised in every manner conceivable.

== Cast ==
- Sreya Bhattacharya as Sreya
- Debraj Bhattacharya as Debraj
- Avery Singha Roy as Avery
- Sabuj Bardhan as Sabuj
- Anujoy Chattopadhyay as Anujoy
- Deboprasad Halder as Deboprasad
- Saoli Chattopadhyay as Saoli
- Samadarshi Dutta as Samadarshi
- Palash Haque as Palash

== Soundtrack ==
The songs in the series are sung by Swaralipi Dasgupta, Soham Dasgupta, Soumit Deb. And music is composed by Pranjal Das, Shamik Guha Roy.

No.	Title	Singer(s)	Length
1	The Macha Song	Pranjal Das/Shamik Guha Roy	2:21
2	Coming Age Song	Alaap Bose	2:49
3	Vinci Rap	Soumit Deb	1:43
4	Tasha Bhashan	N/A	3:13
5	Bhalo Manush Noi	Swaralipi Dasgupta	2:17
		Total Length	12:23

== Episodes ==
No.	Title	Directed by	Original release date
1	"Intro"	Soumit Deb	24 September 2022
Introduction of Vinchi Bharati Academy and its rules, traditions, culture, people, and way of life.
2	"Orientation"	Soumit Deb	24 September 2022
All of the old beliefs are challenged by a new way of life, causing cultural uneasiness.
3	"Assignment"	Soumit Deb	24 September 2022
The second wing of the academy, commanded by Avery, becomes known to the students. The healthy competition has begun.
4	"Uncommon Room"	Soumit Deb	24 September 2022
Students are curious about the unusual room, the reality of which is secret to everybody. At the same time, they are notified that they will be taking classes under Avery.
5	"Healthy Competition"	Soumit Deb	24 September 2022
Two groups compete to the death. Anujoy becomes ill in the middle of this.
6	"Result"	Soumit Deb	24 September 2022
The result was announced in the last episode.
