= Nilacholey Kiriti =

Nilacholey Kiriti is a Bengali, thriller drama film directed by Anindya Bikas Datta and produced by Rupa Datta. The film version is based on Basanta Rajani, the story of Kiriti Roy by Nihar Ranjan Gupta. This film was released on 9 February 2018 with the banner of Camellia Films Private Limited. It is a sequel to 2016 film Kiriti O Kalo Bhromor.

== Plot ==
Newlyweds Kiriti Roy and Krishna go to Puri for their honeymoon. They attend a cultural programme in "Navrang Theatre" where they suddenly meet Kali Sarkar, Kiriti's childhood neighbour. He has taught him to play chess. Kali told that he had met with an accident in Puri. He also invites them on the next day in "Blue View", the hotel where he was staying. Kiriti was astonished why Kali was lying because the accident was happened in Kolkata and not in Puri. They also met a strange Sardarji who had a locket of "Lokenath Baba".

On next day the duo go to "Rainbow view" where they know that Kali had left the hotel on previous night. Kiriti meets the owner of the hotel, Runa Sanyal, from whom he came to know that a room is always booked for him. On the other hand, while waiting for Kriti in the reception, Krishna notices a lady who was keeping a watch on them. They also meet the same sardarji outside the hotel.

The couple visit Konark Moon Temple and Kiriti was narrating the history of the temple to Krishna. They meet a Chemistry professor there who has also an interest in history. He corrects a mistake of him while narrating. While returning, they meet Mr.Patnaik, the B.C. of Puri. Kiriti hears that a dead body is found on the sea beach. He was Mona Ali, a waiter of Rainbow View. He goes through the dead body and gets involved in the case.

At the same night, someone comes to Kali's hotel room and searches something, which was noticed by Runa. Kiriti goes there on the next day and finds a scarf on the balcony. He also finds a diary of Kali where some movements of chess have been noted down. He also meets Harit Sanyal, Runa's husband. He discovers that Kali had a lot of black money and so he used to come in Puri frequently. Kiriti returns to his room and starts analysing the diary. He discovers that there is a wrong movement have been written,"2 RMRJ 4.00". There is also mentioned about Caplablanca . Krishna informs that she had seen the lady of reception and the Sardarji. There is an interesting climax which denotes the complexity of relationships and a dark site of human beings.

== Cast ==
- Indraneil Sengupta as Kiriti Roy
- Rituparna Sengupta as Runa Sanyal
- Arunima Ghosh as Krishna Roy
- Samadarshi Dutta as Subrata
- Shantilal Mukherjee as Harit Sanyal
- Abhishek Chatterjee as Kali Sarkar
- Suchandra Vaniya as Leena
- Rishabh as Ramanuj/Radha

== See also ==
- Kiriti O Kalo Bhromor
- Kiriti Roy (2016 film)
