= Deiva Magan =

1969 film by A. C. Tirulokchandar

- Theatrical release poster
- Directed by: A. C. Tirulokchander
- Screenplay by: A. C. Tirulokchander
- Based on: Ulka by Nihar Ranjan Gupta
- Produced by: Periyanna
- Starring: Sivaji Ganesan; Jayalalithaa
- Cinematography: Thambu
- Edited by: B. Kanthasamy
- Music by: M. S. Viswanathan
- Production company: Shanthi Films
- Release date: 5 September 1969
- Running time: 188 minutes
- Country: India
- Language: Tamil

Deiva Magan (/ðɛɪvə məɡən/ transl. Divine Son) is a 1969 Indian Tamil-language drama film written and directed by A. C. Tirulokchander. An adaptation of the Bengali novel Ulka by Nihar Ranjan Gupta, it stars Sivaji Ganesan in three roles and Jayalalithaa, with Sundarrajan, M. N. Nambiar, Nagesh, V. Nagayya and Pandari Bai in supporting roles. The film is about a scarred man who attempts to reconnect with his estranged family.

Following the 1957 film Ulka, Thayi Karulu (1962), Meri Surat Teri Ankhen (1963) and Thayin Karunai (1965), Deiva Magan was the fifth film adaptation of the novel. Its screenplay was written to be largely different from those earlier films, most of which were poorly received. The film was produced by Periyanna of Shanthi Films, photographed by Thambu, edited by B. Kanthasamy, and Aaroor Dass wrote the dialogues.

Deiva Magan was released on 5 September 1969; it received critical acclaim, primarily for Ganesan's performance, and was a commercial success, running for more than 100 days in theatres. It won the Tamil Nadu State Film Awards for Third Best Film and Best Actor (Ganesan), and was the first South Indian film to be submitted by India in contest for the Academy Award for Best Foreign Language Film.

== Plot ==
Shankar is a successful businessman who has an inferiority complex due to his scarred face. When his wife Parvathi gives birth to a son who is also scarred, Shankar asks the doctor Raju to kill the child to prevent him from experiencing the pain and discrimination Shankar has experienced throughout his life. Rather than kill the baby, Raju takes him to an ashram, where he is raised by its Baba and named Kannan. Shankar and Parvathi are oblivious to Kannan's existence.

Kannan receives little affection growing up at the ashram. Meanwhile, Shankar and Parvathi have another son, Vijay, who is raised with much fondness and pampering. Vijay falls in love with a girl named Nirmala, who rejects him. Vijay's friend Ananth regularly extracts money to construct a hotel, which Vijay manages to get for him. When Baba is dying, he tells Kannan he is not an orphan and to meet Raju to learn more about his past. Nirmala is revealed to be Raju's daughter.

Kannan meets Raju, who is shocked to see his resemblance to Shankar. At first, Raju refuses to tell Kannan about his parents but consents after Kannan guarantees he will only see his parents without revealing his identity. Kannan enthusiastically goes to see his parents at night but Shankar shoots him, thinking he is a thief. Nirmala later reciprocates Vijay's love. Kannan has a chance meeting with Parvathi at a temple, but she does not recognise him.

Parvathi tells Shankar what happened at the temple; Shankar believes it must be his firstborn and meets Raju, who confirms it. Shankar meets Kannan; he offers Kannan a large amount of money so he can live prosperously but does not invite him to live with them. Kannan rejects the money, saying he is content to know his parents. Vijay comes and asks his father for money; Kannan, who is hiding in a cupboard, gestures Shankar to give the rejected money to Vijay.

In the meantime, Ananth wants more money from Vijay, so he kidnaps Vijay and demands a large ransom from Shankar. When Shankar is about to leave with the ransom money, Kannan asks to go instead. Shankar refuses so Kannan knocks him out and goes to the planned meeting disguised as Shankar. Kannan rescues Vijay and kills Ananth but is mortally wounded in the process. Shankar, Parvathi and the police arrive at the scene of the shooting. Kannan dies in the arms of his mother, who accepts him as her son.

== Cast ==
- Sivaji Ganesan as Shankar, Kannan and Vijay
- Jayalalithaa as Nirmala
- Sundarrajan as Raju
- M. N. Nambiar as Ananth
- Nagesh as Boopathy
- V. Nagayya as the Baba
- Pandari Bai as Parvathi
- Vijayasree as Julie

== Production ==
=== Development ===
The Bengali novel Ulka by Nihar Ranjan Gupta had been adapted for the screen four times; a 1957 Bengali film by the same name, a Kannada film Thayi Karulu (1962), a Hindi film Meri Surat Teri Ankhen (1963), and a Tamil film Thayin Karunai (1965). Despite the poor commercial performances of Ulka, Meri Surat Teri Ankhen and Thayin Karunai, director A. C. Tirulokchander was interested in adapting the novel and wrote a screenplay that was largely different from those of the previous films. The film was produced by Periyanna of Shanthi Films, and the dialogues were written by Aaroor Dass. The cinematographer was Thambu, the editor was B. Kanthasamy, and the art director was A. Balu. The film's working title was Uyiroviyam before it was retitled Deiva Magan.

Sivaji Ganesan portrayed three roles; Shankar and his twin sons Kannan and Vijay. This was the second time Ganesan has portrayed three roles in one film; the first occasion was Bale Pandiya (1962). For the characterisation of Kannan, he drew inspiration from Quasimodo, the protagonist of Victor Hugo's novel The Hunchback of Notre-Dame (1831), making Kannan aggressive with "roughness and brute strength", while Vijay's body language was taken from that of filmmaker C. V. Sridhar.

=== Filming ===
Periyanna initially wanted to make the film to be made in colour but it was filmed in black and white at Ganesan's suggestion. The makeup for the scarred characters portrayed by Ganesan was done by R. Rangasamy and his son Jayanth Kumar. Rangasamy gave Ganesan's characters different looks; Shankar's look is sophisticated while Kannan was given a slightly darker skin tone than Vijay's. The original idea was for Kannan to resemble Quasimodo in the 1939 adaptation of The Hunchback of Notre Dame but Ganesan insisted the filmmakers reduce the character's unattractiveness after trying out prosthetics. He wanted viewers to sympathise with Kannan for his shortcomings without feeling repulsed by the character. Kannan is a sitar player but Ganesan did not know how to play the instrument; he pretended to play it instead.

There were difficulties in filming the scene in which Kannan is hiding in a cupboard and gestures to Shankar to give a cheque to Vijay; the scene required Ganesan to change his look between takes because the camera could not be moved, meaning he had to stand in one spot, mouth his lines, quickly change his attire and makeup to play the second character, stand in the same place and act. To ease the process, he asked Tirulokchander to stand in for him. Kanthasamy told Tirulokchander this seven-minute-long scene needed trimming but after re-watching it several times, Tirulokchander refused because he could not find what to cut and liked the way Ganesan performed as the three characters. The final cut of the film was initially 4,700.01 metres (15,420.0 ft); after five cuts by the Censor Board, it was brought down to 4,695.84 metres (15,406.3 ft).

== Music ==
The soundtrack to Deiva Magan was composed by M. S. Viswanathan and the lyrics were written by Kannadasan. The song "Deivame Deivame Nandri Solven" is Ganesan's homage to politician C. N. Annadurai, which is evident when it is played over a scene where Kannan screams "Anna". Kannadasan wrote the pallavi for a song. Tirulokchander and the others liked it, so Kannadasan completed writing the song and had a meeting where they listened to it. When an office boy came to serve them coffee, Kannadasan asked him whether he liked the song. The boy said though the song sounded good, he did not understand the meaning. Immediately, Kannadasan told Viswanathan to compose a different tune so he could write different lyrics. Despite those present objecting, Kannadasan persisted, resulting in the creation of the song "Kettadhum Koduppavane Krishna". The song, like many of Kannadasan's other songs, praises the Hindu god Krishna as "a simple god that responds to a poor man's prayer". The songs "Kaadhal Malar Kootam" and "Kaathalikka Katrukollungal" also became popular.

Track listing
No.	Title	Singers	Length
1.	"Anbulla Nanbare"	T. M. Soundararajan	4:02
2.	"Deivame Deivame Nandri Solven"	T. M. Soundararajan	5:23
3.	"Kangal Pesuthamma"	Sirkazhi Govindarajan	2:42
4.	"Kaadhal Malar Kootam"	T. M. Soundararajan	3:58
5.	"Kaathalikka Katrukollungal"	T. M. Soundararajan, P. Susheela	3:16
6.	"Kettadhum Koduppavane Krishna"	T. M. Soundararajan	4:00
7.	"Kettadhum Koduppavane Krishna" (version 2)	T. M. Soundararajan	3:52
8.	"Koottathileya Yarthan"	P. Susheela	3:45
Total length:			30:58

== Release ==
Deiva Magan was released on 5 September 1969. Despite being released just four weeks after another Ganesan film, Nirai Kudam, it was a critical and commercial success, running for over 100 days in theatres. The release of Ganesan's films Thirudan and Sivandha Mann in the following months also did not affect Deiva Magan's theatrical run.

=== Reception ===
According to the Tamil magazine Ananda Vikatan, most films in which one actor portraying multiple roles often have problems like impersonation and identity confusion, but the lack of these problems in Deiva Magan was an achievement for the director. The reviewer praised Ganesan's triple-role performance, mainly that of Vijay, and also appreciated Jayalalithaa's performance but felt Pandari Bai was under-used. The reviewer concluded the filmmakers had tried to build a hall with only one pillar and that pillar was Ganesan. The Indian Express's reviewer praised Ganesan's performance as Shankar, along with the performances of Pandari Bai and Nagesh, but said the latter had "little to do with the story". The reviewer praised the set designs, Thambu's cinematography, and Viswanathan's music, concluding that Tirulokchander "can relax for having directed a successful commercial melodramatic film". After watching the film, C. V. Sridhar appreciated Ganesan's performance as Vijay, saying only he "could have done it so beautifully".

=== Accolades ===
At the Tamil Nadu State Film Awards, Deiva Magan won the Third Best Film award and Ganesan won the Best Actor award. The film was selected as India's official entry for the Best Foreign Language Film nomination for the 42nd Academy Awards; it was the first South Indian film to be submitted by India in the Best International Feature Film category.

== Legacy ==
Kamal Haasan has acknowledged various films as influences on Michael Madana Kama Rajan (1990), namely Deiva Magan along with Nadodi Mannan (1958) and Yaadon Ki Baaraat (1973).

== See also ==
- List of submissions to the 42nd Academy Awards for Best Foreign Language Film

== Bibliography ==
- Hardgrave, Robert L. (1979). Essays in the political sociology of South India. Usha. ISBN 978-0-8364-0605-4.
