= Maya Mriga =

- Directed by: Chitta Bose
- Screenplay by: Mani Barman
- Story by: Nihar Ranjan Gupta
- Produced by: Sunil Basu Mallick
- Starring: Uttam Kumar; Sandhya Roy; Biswajit Chatterjee; Sunanda Banerjee
- Cinematography: Bhabotosh Bhattachariya, Sukumar Shee
- Edited by: Robin Das
- Music by: Manabendra Mukherjee
- Production company: MKG Productions Private Limited
- Distributed by: Kalika Films Pvt Ltd
- Release date: 1960
- Running time: 135 minutes
- Country: India
- Language: Bengali

Maya Mriga is a 1960 Indian Bengali-language film directed by Chitta Bose. This film was released under the banner of MKG Private Production Limited. The film stars Uttam Kumar, Sandhya Roy and Biswajit Chatterjee. It is based on the play of the same name by Nihar Ranjan Gupta.

== Plot ==
Sabitri and Seeta are the older and younger daughters of a rich man. Sabitri is married to barrister Amiyanath Mukherjee. She is childless. Seeta marries an educated, unemployed person, Bibhuti Chatterjee. Their father is angered and after his death, all the property goes to Sabitri. Seeta gives birth to a male child. Sabitri loves him, and wants the child from Seeta, but she refused. One year later, Bibhuti is imprisoned prison. Seeta takes the money from Sabitri to save her husband and gives her child to Sabitri. She promises that she will not reveal the truth to anybody till her death. The baby, Shuvra grows up and enters a medical college. Amiya and Sabitri, good host and hostess, have many guests in their house. They are poor and have everything needed for living. One of them is Nirupama, a young beautiful college student. One is Mahendra, a gambler but kind. The funny Mani Shurva is in love with Nirupama. Sabitri and Shuvra have a rich bond between them. One day Sabitri receives a letter from Seeta, saying that they are coming. Shocked Sabitri, decides to keep them far from her son. Bibhuti has lost one leg and they have lost their younger son, Rajat. Bibuthi and Seeta get a shelter from Sabitri, in their other house. But destiny sends Shuvra to them. Bibhuti meets in another house. But destiny sends Shuvra takes him to the doctor and comes close to this older couple. Their thirst for a child increases, Seeta starts to visit him secretly. Sabitri, with great fear, insults them. They leave but Mahendra traces them for Sabitri. Sabitri discovers Nirupama and Shuvra's affair. She insults her. Shaken, Bibhuti has a fatal heart attack. Widow Seeta leaves the house with Nirupama. Mahendra tells the story to Shuvra, advises him to reveal the truth. Shuvra asks her mother and learns the truth. He comes to Seeta, and accepts both sister as two mothers. Nirupama returns into his life.

== Cast ==
- Uttam Kumar as Mahim
- Sunanda Banerjee as Sabitri
- Biswajit Chatterjee as Rajatsubhra
- Sandhya Roy as Sudha
- Tulsi Chakraborty
- Chhabi Biswas

== Soundtrack ==
Mayamriga

Soundtrack album by Manabendra Mukherjee
- Released: 1959
- Recorded: 1960
- Studio: MKG Productions Private Limited
- Length: 0:10:02
- Producer: Sunil Basu Mallick

Manabendra Mukherjee chronology
Nader Nimai (1960)	Mayamriga (1959)	Maa (1961)

All lyrics are written by Shyamal Gupta; all music is composed by Manabendra Mukherjee.

Songs
No.	Title	Playback	Length
1.	"Kshati Ki Na Hoy Aaj Porbe"	Manabendra Mukherjee	2:56
2.	"Ore Son Son Gerobaj"	Hemanta Mukherjee	4:06
3.	"O Bak Bak Bak Bakam Bakam"	Sandhya Mukherjee	3:00
Total length:			10:02

== Remakes ==
The film was remade in Tamil as Annai (1962) and in Hindi as Laadla (1966) starred Balraj Sahni and Nirupa Roy and in Malayalam as Amma in (1976).
