= Gangulys Wed Guhas =

Indian web series

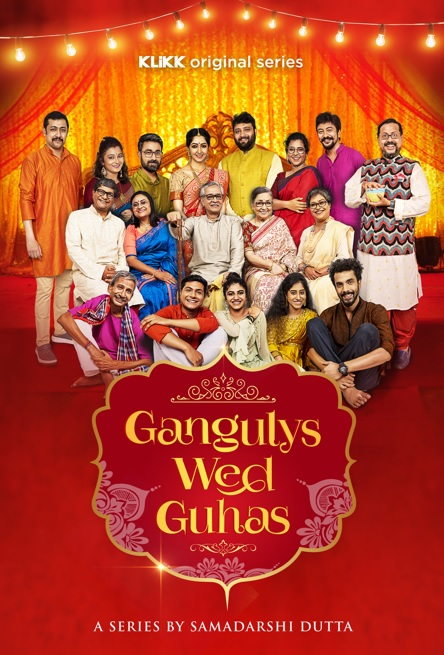
- Genre: Romance Drama
- Written by: Samadarshi Dutta
- Directed by: Samadarshi Dutta
- Starring: Saumya Sengupta, Ebong Ipsita, Romi Choudhuri, Biplab Bandyopadhyay, Sudipa Basu, Samadarshi Dutta, Amrita Chattopadhyay, Subhrajit Dutta, Kaushiki, and Jayati Chakraborty
- Country of origin: India
- Original language: Bengali
- No. of seasons: 1
- No. of episodes: 7

Production
- Executive producer: Amlandeep Chowdhury

Original release
- Release: 20 September 2021

Gangulys Wed Guhas is a 2021 Indian Bengali language romance drama web series written and directed by Samadarshi Dutta.

The main cast in the series are Saumya Sengupta, Ebong Ipsita, Romi Choudhuri, Biplab Bandyopadhyay, Sudipa Basu, Samadarshi Dutta, Amrita Chattopadhyay, Subhrajit Dutta, Kaushiki, and Jayati Chakraborty. The web series is produced under Orange & Yellow Films.

== Synopsis ==
The Gangulys, who reside as a single family in their old Nilmoni Mitra Lane home, are different from the Guhas who now reside at Ballygunge Place. The "artsy" Bengali family the Guhas can practically all dance kathak, sing rabindra sangeet, and watch plays at Tolly club while enjoying wine and cheese. The Ganguly family, on the other hand, is a long-established North Calcutta "Bonedi" family that still takes pride in its collection of antique furniture and ties to the Cooch Behar royal line. They appear to have an air of fake intellectual superiority about them and are a "joint family" of distinguished advocates, physicians, and engineers. Despite how different the two families are from one another, they end up together.

The narrative follows the entire wedding process, from Paka Dekha and Aiburo bhaat through the reception and how these families ultimately reconcile amid rising tension, funny mishaps, rib-tickling secrets, unplanned romantic reunions, and youthful love.

== Cast ==
- Saumya Sengupta
- Ebong Ipsita
- Romi Choudhuri
- Biplab Bandyopadhyay
- Sudipa Basu
- Samadarshi Dutta
- Amrita Chattopadhyay
- Kaushiki
- Jayati Chakraborty
- Subhrajit Dutta

== Episodes ==
No.	Title	Directed by	Original release date
1	"Astonishing Aiburo Bhaat"	Samadarshi Dutta	20 September 2021
The Guhas have arrived at the Gangulys, the wedding preparations are in full swing, and amid the rekindling of old, unfulfilled ties, new ones emerge.
2	"Spicy Sangeet"	Samadarshi Dutta	20 September 2021
The Guhas and the Gangulys arguing about a lavish sangeet feast. What happens when Pranay and Madhura try to play cupid?
3	"Glamorous Gaaye Holud"	Samadarshi Dutta	20 September 2021
Reliving old experiences can either heal the soul or open up fresh wounds—a thousand silent whispers. What kind of thing? Stranger than fiction, truth is.
4	"Magnificent Malabodol"	Samadarshi Dutta	20 September 2021
After the gaye-holud ritual, a drunk Subimal causes chaos. What happens if your own app indicates that you are not suitable before the wedding?
5	"Blissful Basarrat"	Samadarshi Dutta	20 September 2021
Mohini-Ricky, Sneha-Piklu, Shuktara-Antarikkho, and Rita-Pritimoy had a heart-to-heart talk while a little intoxicated by love. Pranay is reluctant to confess, and Snigdha loses it.
6	"Baffling Basi Biye"	Samadarshi Dutta	20 September 2021
Madhura hears Pranay admit to sleeping with Tanya at a school reunion. What follows is what?
7	"A Brilliant Boubhaat"	Samadarshi Dutta	20 September 2021
The Gangulys and the Guhas finally unite for Pranay and Madhura's reception after much fighting.

== Soundtrack ==
Gangulys Wed Guhas (Original Score from the series) The songs in the series are sung by Sravan Bhattacharyya, Jayanti Bhattacharyya, Soumya Murshidabadi, Amrita Singh and Ujjaini Mukherjee. And music is composed by Ritam Sen.

No.	Title	Singer(s)	Length
1	Jodi Hridoy (Duet)	Sravan Bhattacharyya/Jayanti Bhattacharyya	4:00
1	Jodi Hridoy (Male)	Sravan Bhattacharyya	4:18
1	Jodi Hridoy (Female)	Jayanti Bhattacharyya	4:18
1	Jodi Hridoy (Reprise)	Soumya Murshidabadi/Amrita Singh	4:18
1	Du Chokhe Harai	Ujjaini Mukherjee	4:12
		Total Length	21:06
