= Aamar Pratigya =

- Directed by: Swapan Saha
- Written by: Perarasu
- Starring: Priyanshu Chatterjee; Priyanka Trivedi
- Release date: 29 February 2008
- Running time: 142 minutes
- Country: India
- Language: Bengali
- Budget: ₹10 million (US$120,000)

Aamar Pratigya (Bengali: আমার প্রতিজ্ঞা "My Promise") is a 2008 film Indian Bengali film directed by Swapan Saha. The film is an official remake of 2005 Tamil movie Sivakasi.

== Cast ==
- Biswanath Basu
- Priyanshu Chatterjee as Shiba / Bijoy Raj Chowdhury
- Priyanka Trivedi
- Paoli Dam
- Tathoi Deb
- Premjit Chatterjee
- Surajit Sen
- Rajatava Dutta
- Dulal Lahiri
- Subhasish Mukhopadhyay
- Laboni Sarkar
