= Badsha (1963 film) =

- Directed by: Agradoot
- Screenplay by: Agradoot
- Story by: Nihar Ranjan Gupta
- Starring: Kali Banerjee; Bikash Roy; Asit Baran
- Cinematography: Bibhuti Laha
- Edited by: Baidyanath Chatterjee
- Music by: Hemanta mukhopadhyay
- Release date: 14 December 1963
- Running time: 117 minutes
- Country: India
- Language: Bengali

Badsha is an Indian Bengali-language children drama film directed by Agradoot based on a same name novel of Nihar Ranjan Gupta. The film was released on 29 November 1963 under the banner of Sree Bishnu Pictures. The film's music director was Hemanta Mukhopadhyay.

== Plot ==
Badsha is thief having criminal record in police file. His life totally changes when he raises an abandoned child as his own son. He completely gave up all his criminal activities, began leading a simple life and became known in society as the child's father. But the child belongs to a wealthy family and they are searching the baby for years. He struggles to protect the boy as father, leads to a tragic end.

== Cast ==
- Kali Banerjee as Badsha
- Bikash Roy as Doctor
- Asit Baran
- Sandhyarani
- Master Shankar
- Tarun Kumar
- Premangshu Bose
- Suruchi Sengupta
- Shefali Banerjee
- Ardhendu Bhattacharya

== See more ==
- Badshah (1964 film)
- Baadshah (1999 film)
- Baadshah (2013 film)
