= Soumik Sen =

Indian screenwriter and film director

Soumik Sen is an Indian film director, screenwriter, and music composer. He has written the screenplay for films such as Anthony Kaun Hai? (2006), Ru Ba Ru and Meerabai Not Out (2008) and Hum Tum Aur Ghost (2010). In 2014 he directed and wrote the screenplay and composed the songs of the crime film Gulaab Gang. Sen's debut picture was described by Indiatimes as "full of self deprecating humour and quiet confidence that stems from his script and leading lady, Madhuri Dixit-Nene". He directed and composed songs for the 2019 release Why Cheat India. He has also directed a Bengali film, "Mahalaya", the biopic of Birendra Krishna Bhadra, produced by Nideas. Sen also is the creator of Amazon Prime's hugely acclaimed show Jubilee .

In celebration of the 100th anniversary of Indian cinema, Sen was one of the top figures selected by CNN-IBN to draw up The 100 greatest Indian films of all time.

In the year 2024 he received the Pride of Bengal award from the Indian Chamber of Commerce in Kolkata.

== Filmography ==
Denotes films that have not yet been released

Year	Film	Screenplay	Director	Composer	Story	Notes	Ref.
2006	Anthony Kaun Hai?	Yes	No	No	Yes		
2008	Ru Ba Ru	Yes	No	Yes	No		
2008	Meerabai Not Out	Yes	No	No	Yes		
2009	Saluun	No	No	Yes	No		
2010	Hum Tum Aur Ghost	Yes	No	No	No		
2014	Gulaab Gang	Yes	Yes	Yes	Yes		
2016	Badman	Yes	Yes	Yes	Yes		
2019	Why Cheat India	Yes	Yes	Yes	Yes		
2019	Skyfire	No	Yes	No	No		
2019	Mahalaya	Yes	Yes	No	Yes		
2021	Nakaab	Yes	Yes	No	Yes		
2023	Jubilee	Yes	No	No	Yes		
2026	Jazz City	Yes	Yes	No	Yes	Web series on SonyLIV; based on Bangladesh Liberation War	
