= Jayati Chakraborty =

Bengali singer

- জয়তী চক্রবর্তী
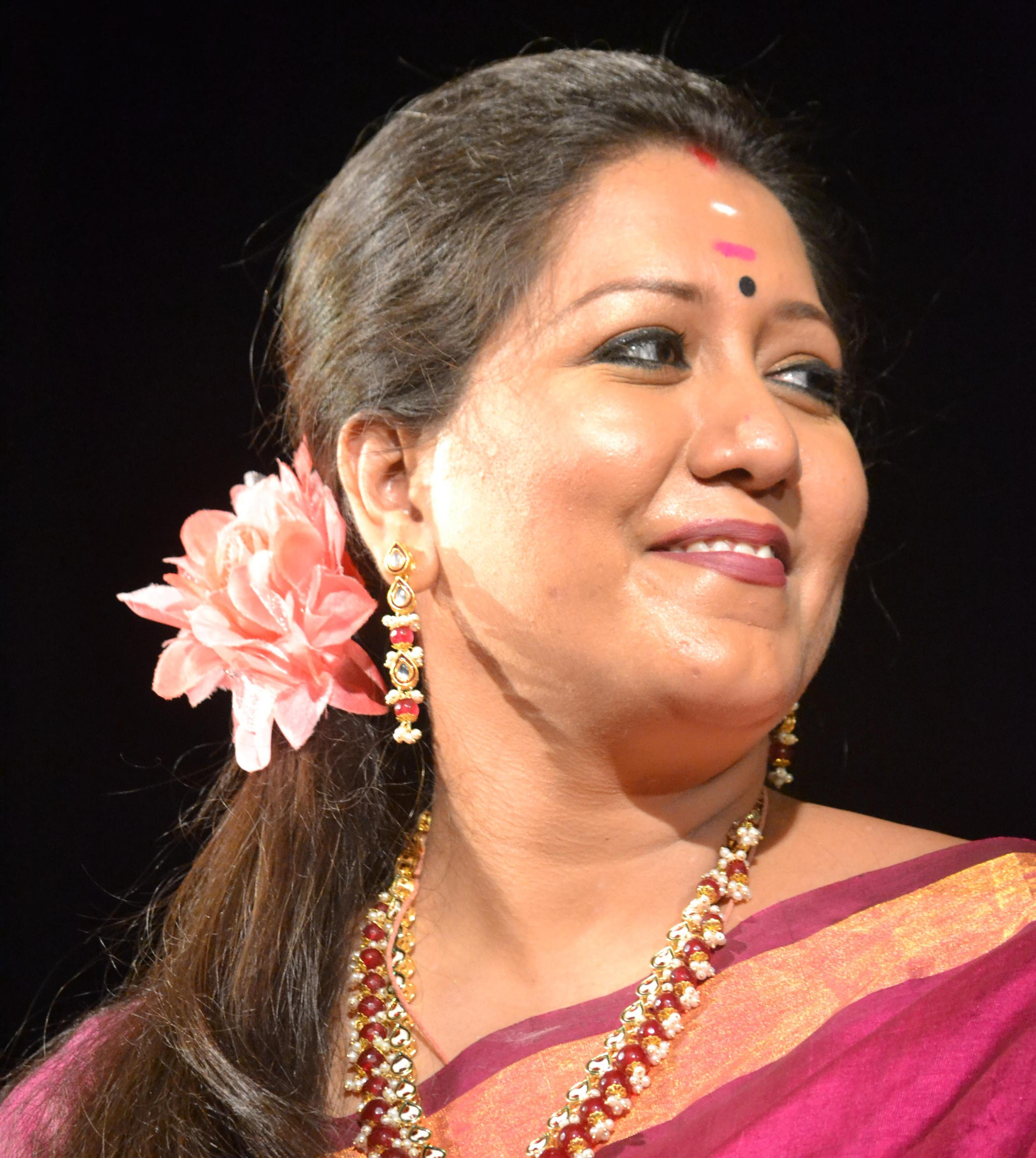
- Born: Kolkata, West Bengal, India
- Citizenship: India
- Occupation: singer
- Years active: 2002–present
- Spouse: Married

Jayati Chakraborty is a Bengali Indian exponent of Rabindra Sangeet and Bengali songs. She has worked as a playback singer in Bengali cinema.

== Partial albums ==
She has released many albums, such as:

- Durer Pari
- Kagojer Nouka
- Tomaro Ashime
- E Hridoy
- Akasher Nir
- Ke Jabi
- Komal Gandhar (2015)
- Folk Lok (2016)
- Ebong Jayati (2018)
- Best of Jayati Chakraborty (2019)

== Partial filmography ==
- Bye Bye Bangkok (2011)
- Mrs. Sen (2013)
- Aamar Aami (2014)
- Bodhon (2015)
- Jogajog (2015)
- Tagore's Natir Puja: The Court Dancer (2016)
- Bilu Rakkhosh (2017)
- Bhootchakra Pvt. Ltd. (2019)
- Jyeshthoputro (2019)
- Gangulys Wed Guhas (2021)

== Awards ==
- WBFJA Awards: Best Female Playback Singer for "Dyakho Dyakho Kanaiye" from Lawho Gouranger Naam Re
- Anandalok Puraskar 2026: Best Female Playback Singer for "Dyakho Dyakho Kanaiye" from Lawho Gouranger Naam Re

== See also ==
- List of Indian playback singers
