= Priyanshu Chatterjee =

Indian actor (born 1973)

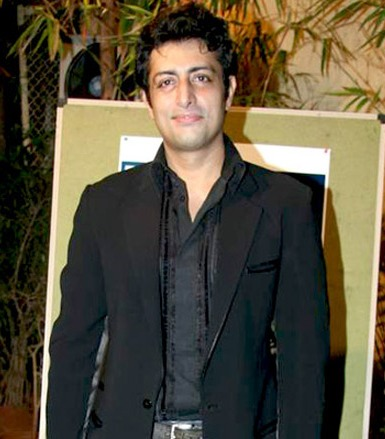
- Born: 20 February 1973 (age 53); New Delhi, India
- Occupations: Actor; model
- Years active: 2001–present
- Spouse: Malini Sharma (m. 1997; div. 2001)

Priyanshu Chatterjee (Bengali pronunciation: [prijaŋʃu t͡ʃaʈard͡ʒi]; born 20 February 1973) is an Indian actor and former model known for his work in Hindi and Bengali cinema.

He made his acting debut with Tum Bin (2001). His other notable films include Aapko Pehle Bhi Kahin Dekha Hai, Dil Ka Rishta, Pinjar, Bhoothnath, Hate Story 3, Baadshaho and Shikara.

== Personal life ==
Priyanshu Chatterjee was born in New Delhi, India, to a Bengali-speaking family. He attended Cambridge Foundation School in Delhi and graduated with a Bachelor of Commerce from Ram Lal Anand College, Delhi University.

Priyanshu married model Malini Sharma in 1997. The couple divorced in 2001.

== Career ==
Chatterjee began his career as a model, appearing in advertising campaigns for brands including Digjam, Wills Cigarettes, Levi's and Four Square. He subsequently appeared in a music video featuring Udit Narayan.

Chatterjee made his acting debut with the romantic drama Tum Bin (2001), directed by Anubhav Sinha. His performance received positive reviews, with Bollywood Hungama noting that he had the "meatier role" and performed it with sincerity. Following the success of Tum Bin, Sinha cast Chatterjee in his next film, Aapko Pehle Bhi Kahin Dekha Hai, alongside Sakshi Shivanand, Om Puri and Farida Jalal.

In 2003, Chatterjee appeared in two further films, Dil Ka Rishta, alongside Aishwarya Rai, and Pinjar, opposite Sandali Sinha. In 2004, he starred in Woh and Madhoshi, both of which were unsuccessful at the box office.

Chatterjee subsequently took on supporting roles, including a small appearance in the 2008 multi-starrer Bhoothnath, in which he portrayed the son of Amitabh Bachchan's titular character. In 2015, he made a cameo appearance in Hate Story 3.

== Filmography ==
=== Film ===
Year	Title	Role	Notes
2001	Tum Bin	Shekhar Malhotra	
2003	Aapko Pehle Bhi Kahin Dekha Hai	Samar Dev	
2003	Dil Ka Rishta	Raj Sharma	
2003	Pinjar	Trilok	
2004	Woh	Shekhar Kapoor	
2004	Julie	Mihir Shandilya	
2004	Madhoshi	Arpit Oberoi / Raj	
2005	Film Star	Adv. Digamber Puri	
2005	Koi Mere Dil Mein Hai	Raj Malhotra	
2006	Utthaan	Prashant Bharti	
2007	Main Rony Aur Jony	Tej Singh	
2007	Bidhatar Lekha	Deepankar	Bengali film
2008	Aamar Pratigya	Shiba / Bijoy Raj Chowdhury	Bengali film
2008	Bhoothnath	Vijay Nath	
2008	Nauka Dubi	Babu Moshai	Bengali film
2009	Chintu Ji	Arun Bakshi / Mohit Baghel	
2010	Gumshuda	Goutam Dutt	
2010	Moner Manush	Jyotirindranath Tagore	Indo-Bangladeshi film
2010	Florida Road	Sanjay	English film
2011	Punorutthan	Siddhartha	Bengali film
2011	Bhorer Allo	Arunabha Mitra	Bengali film
2011	Iti Mrinalini	Imtiaz Chowdhury	Bengali film
2012	Sirphire	Inder	Pakistani Punjabi film
2012	Paanch Adhyay	Arindam Roy Chowdhury	Bengali film
2013	Rajdhani Express	Mr. Banerjee	
2013	Shunyo Awnko	Agni Bose	Bengali film
2013	One Liner		Bengali film
2013	Blue Neptune	Kuldeep	
2013	Calapor	Chiti Pandhar	
2013	Swabhoomi	Ritobrata Mukherjee	Bengali film
2014	Samrat & Co.	S. K. Singh	
2014	Ei Raat Tomar Amar	Arya Chowdhury	Bengali film
2014	Amar Taka Kothay		Bengali film
2015	Barkhaa	Aakash Sabarwal	
2015	Troyee	Sanjay	Bengali film
2015	Hate Story 3	Vikram Dewan	
2015	Un plus une	Himself	Special appearance; French film
2016	Potadar Kirtee	Potol Chandra Das	Bengali film
2016	Sangabora	Anirban	Bengali film
2016	Shankhachil	BSF Officer Ravi Verma	Indo-Bangladeshi film
2016	Dreaded Gangster	Abu Salem	
2017	Majaz- Ae Gham-e-Dil Kya Karun	Majaz	Hindustani-Urdu film
2017	61 Garpar Lane	Supratik	Bengali film
2017	Wedding Anniversary	Nirbhay	
2017	Ebong Kiriti	Kiriti Roy	Bengali film
2017	Mirza Juuliet	Dharamraj	
2017	Baadshaho	Sanjay Kumar	
2018	Billu Ustaad	Ajay Shrivastava IAS	
2018	Colours Of Life	Diwakar Mukherjee	Bengali film
2018	OSKAR	Rudra Chattopadhyay	Bengali film
2018	Lashtam Pashtam	Maj. Vijay Oberoi	
2018	Sundari		Bengali film
2019	Little Baby Film	SSP Dushyant Singh	
2019	Officer Arjun Singh IPS Batch 2000	IPS Arjun Pratap Singh	
2020	Shikara	Dr. Naveen Kumar Dhar / Naveen Zutshi	
2020	Khabar		
2021	Barun Rai and the House on the Cliff	Barun Rai	English film
2022	3 Shyaane		
2022	Achena Uttam	Satyajit Ray	Bengali film
2023	Non Stop Dhamaal	Khatri	
2023	12th Fail	DSP Dushyant Singh	
2023	Sajini Shinde Ka Viral Video		
2024	Sadhu Mehi	Maharshi Mehi Paramhans	
2025	Mayamrigaya	Gurudev Rabindranath Tagore	Bengali film
2025	Rabindra Kabya Rahasya	Gurudev Rabindranath Tagore	Bengali film
2025	The Bengal Files	Justice Banerjee	
2026	Azad Bharath	Shrikant Ranjan Das	

=== Web series ===
Year	Title	Role	Platform	Notes
2019	Coldd Lassi Aur Chicken Masala	Dr. Karan Kapadia	ALTBalaji and ZEE5	
2023	Fireflies: Parth Aur Jugnu	Dr. Arjun Negi	ZEE5	
2024	Dil Dosti Dilemma	Rohan Kariappa	Amazon Prime	
2025	Mrs. Deshpande	Arun Khatri	JioHotstar	

=== Music videos ===
- " Jaanam (Medley) " (1999)

=== Short films ===
- " Jaanam " (2002)
- " Dhal Gaya Din Ho Gayi Sham " (2003)
- " Teri Yaad " (2011)
- " Jaane Kya Tune Kahi..." as Rishabh (2012), launched by FTII, Pune.
