= Kiriti Roy =

Bengali fictional detective character by Nihar Ranjan Gupta

- Kiriti Roy character
- First appearance: Kalo Bhramar (1985)
- Last appearance: Nilacholey Kiriti (2018)
- Created by: Dr. Nihar Ranjan Gupta
- Portrayed by: Chiranjeet Chakraborty; Indraneil Sengupta; Priyanshu Chatterjee

In-universe information
- Gender: Male
- Title: Roy
- Occupation: Private investigator
- Family: Krishna Roy (wife)
- Religion: Hinduism
- Nationality: Indian
- Height: 6 ft 6 in (1.98 m)
- Friend: Subrata

Kiriti Roy is a fictional detective of Bengali literature created by Dr. Nihar Ranjan Gupta. The first story introduces him as follows: "Kiriti Roy is six and a half feet tall, fair and stout. His curled hair is mostly combed back, and the black celluloid spectacles make his clean-shaven face highly attractive." In his own words, "In this universe, virtue and sin reside in parallel. Reward for virtue and scorn for sin is the thumb rule of the universe."

== Personal life ==
After saving her from a difficult situation in the tale "Kalo Bhromor", Kiriti falls in love with Krishna Mehta, a Parsi lady. The courtship ends in marriage (In the tale "Holud Shoitan"). Krishna is intelligent, happens to be a good singer (can sing Rabindrasangeet), can speak Bengali, has a mind of her own and takes keen interest in her husband's work.

== Other characters ==
=== Subrata ===
Subrata Roy is the assistant cum friend of Kiriti. He is also the narrator of some stories.

== Kiriti Series ==
Kiriti Roy's mysteries are available in collected editions and are still popular. As part of the Kiriti series, there are more than 100 novels and stories.

- Kalo Bhramar - Kalo Bhramar is a Robin-hood like character. A highly intelligent adversary, he begins a feud with Subrata and Kiriti. All four parts of the story are included in this archive.
- Rotibilap - This is a novel where the events are explosive.
- Rat Nijhum
- Ghum Nei
- Kolonko Kotha
- Hira Chuni Panna
- Mrityubaan
- Tri-Rahasya
- Teen Kiriti
- Char Kiriti - This book contains four expeditions of Kiriti, namely - "Marich Sanghar", "Samne Samudra Neel", "Golaper Rong Lal", "Rokto Gerua". All are full of suspense and thrill.
- Dui Dojonn Kiriti
- Kiriti Omnibus - This is a collection of the stories of Kiriti Roy, in 15 volumes.
- Kiriti Omnibus (Volume 1) - contents: - 1. Kiriti Tatya (Introduction), 2. Kiritir Abirbhab, 3. Rahasyabhedi, 4. Chokri, 5. Bouranir Bill and 6. Harer Pasha.
- Kiriti Omnibus (Volume 2) - contents: - 1. Introduction, 2. Duti Kotha (Nihar Ranjan Gupta), 3. Holud Shoitan, 4. Dainir Banshi, 5. Dragon, 6. Momer Alo, 7. Basanta Rajani and Kalo Pakhi.
- Kiriti Omnibus (Volume 3) - contents: - 1. Introduction, 2. Bishkumbha, 3. Mrityubaan, 4. Ratri Jokhon Gabhir Hoy and 5. Aloklata.
- Kiriti Omnibus (Volume 4) - contents: - 1. Introduction(Sri. Bijanbihari Bhattacharya), 2. Atal Soikote, 3. Banamorali, 4. Subhadra Haran and 5. Bidyut Bahni.
- Kiriti Omnibus (Volume 5) - contents: - 1. Introduction(Ashutosh Bhattacharya), 2. Mon Paban, 3. Adrishya Shatru, 4. Projapoti Rong, 5. Charer Angka and 6. Adim Ripu.
- Kiriti Omnibus (Volume 6) - contents: - 1. Introduction(Dr. Arun Kumar Mukherjee), 2. Mrigatrishna, 3. Mithun Lagna and 4. Monikundola.
- Kiriti Omnibus (Volume 7) - contents: - 1. Introduction(Sumathnath Ghosh), 2. Krishna Kaberi, 3. Rotibilap and 4. Madan Bhashma.
- Kiriti Omnibus (Volume 8) - contents: - 1. Introduction(Pranoy Kumar Kundu), 2. Ripu Sanghar, 3. Nagpal, 4. Setarer Sur and 5. Ora Tinjon and Chhora.
- Kiriti Omnibus (Volume 9) - contents: - 1. Introduction(Dr. Sri. Nanilal Sen), 2. Kalohaat, 3. Chhaya Kuheli, 4. Mrityubish and 5. Padmini.
- Kiriti Omnibus (Volume 10) - contents: - 1. Introduction (Ajit Kumar Ghosh), 2. Ghum Nei, 3. Kolonka Kotha and 4. Heera Chunni Panna.
- Kiriti Omnibus (Volume 11) - contents: - 1. Aholya Ghum, 2. Heerakangurio, 3. Ghum Bhangar Raat and 4. Neelkuthi.
- Kiriti Omnibus (Volume 12) - contents: - 1. Introduction(Jitendra Nath Chakrabarti), 2. Sarpil, 3. Raktolobhi Nishachor, 4. Batrishh Singhashon, 5. Nirala Prohor and 6. Ratna Monjil.
- Kiriti Omnibus (Volume 13) - contents: - 1. Introduction(Subodh Kumar Majumdar), 2. Aaloke Andhar, 3. Nagar Noti, 4. Rokter Daag, 5. Blue-print, 6. Reshmi Phansh, 7. Padyadoher Pishach and 8. Panchamukhi Heera.
- Kiriti Omnibus (Volume 14) - contents: - 1. Introduction(Sujit Kumar Sengupta), 2. Urbashi Sandhya, 3. Basanter Din Shiter Ratri and 4. Marich Sanghar.
- Kiriti Omnibus (Volume 15) - contents: - 1. Introduction(Barnik Ray), 2. Jugal Bandi, 3. Samne Samudra Neel, 4. Manashi Tumi and 5. Abagunthita.

== Kiriti in Other Media ==
=== Films ===
Though the sleuth's celluloid debut happened late, the timeless appeal of Kiriti has already procreated number of movies. So far, the character of Kiriti has been essayed by Chiranjeet Chakraborty in Kiriti Roy (2016 film), Indraneil Sengupta in Kiriti O Kalo Bhromor (2016) and Nilacholey Kiriti (2018), Priyanshu Chatterjee in Ebong Kiriti (2017).

Year	Title	Actor	Director	Book	Producer	Ref.
2016	Kiriti Roy	Chiranjeet Chakraborty	Aniket Chattopadhyay	Setarer Sur	Eskay Movies	
2016	Kiriti O Kalo Bhromor	Indraneil Sengupta	Anindya Bikas Datta	Kalo Bhramar	Camellia Films Private Ltd	
2017	Ebong Kiriti	Priyanshu Chatterjee	Anirban Paria	Ratibilaap	Dream Light Movie	
2018	Nilacholey Kiriti	Indraneil Sengupta	Anindya Bikas Datta	Basanta Rajani	Camellia Films Private Ltd	

=== Radio ===
The radio adaptations of Kiriti are mainly in the form of Sunday Suspense, an audio story series by Radio Mirchi 98.3 FM. Now another YouTube Channel named Sahitya Samahar creates many audio stories in a series with stories of Kiriti. In and around the nineteen eighties, an attempt was made to create a radio series on Kiriti's tales including Roktomukhi Neela, Bagh Nokh and Reshmi Phaansh.

== See also ==
- Kiriti O Kalo Bhromor, 2016 Bengali film
- Kiriti Roy (2016 film), 2016 Bengali film
- Ebong Kiriti, 2017 Bengali film
- Nilacholey Kiriti, 2018 Bengali film
