= Ankita Chakraborty =

Indian actress

- Born: August 18, 1986 (age 40); Kolkata, West Bengal
- Occupation: Actress
- Years active: 2004–present
- Spouse: Prantik Banerjee (m. 2022)

Ankita Chakraborty is an Indian actress who is known for her work in Bengali cinema and television.

== Career ==
Ankita began her acting career in theatre while still a high school student. Her debut on Bengali television was Agnipariksha (2009). Her appearance in Ishti Kutum (2011) as an Economics professor, Kamalika Mukherjee, gained her recognition.

In 2014, the mystery thriller Byomkesh Phire Elo marked her debut in Bengali films. She went on to appear in successor films of the series with Byomkesh Bakshi (2015), Byomkesh O Chiriyakhana (2016), and Byomkesh O Agnibaan (2017). She appeared in films like Kiriti Roy (2016), Ebong Kiriti (2017), and Shankar Mudi (2019).

She ventured into web series, shuffling between Kolkata and Mumbai, appearing in Bengali and Hindi-language series. She starred in the Hoichoi series Charitraheen (2019), Bou Kenu Psycho (2019), and Pabitra Puppies (2020). She played the role of Bidua in the ZEE5 series Mafia (2020). Her Hindi language series include Hai Tauba (2020), Crimes and Confessions (2020), and Nakaab (2021), alongside Mallika Sherawat and Esha Gupta. She then acted in the Bengali crime thriller series Danny Detective Inc. (2022) and Seven (2023), both directed by Anjan Dutt, marking her sixth collaboration.

She continued to appear in television series like Bhoomikanya (2018), Phagun Bou (2018), Mohor (2019), and Prothoma Kadambin (2020). In 2021, she starred in Golper Mayajaal and The Darling Wife.

In 2022, she was cast in the titular role in the television series Indrani as Indrani Roy. She starred alongside Sabitri Chatterjee in Kadambari Aajo (2022).

== Personal life ==
In 2022, Ankita married her longtime friend and Bengali actor, Prantik Banerjee.

== Filmography ==
| Year | Title | Role | Note | Ref |
|---|---|---|---|---|
| 2014 | Byomkesh Phire Elo | Medini | Debut | |
| 2014 | Aaleya | | | |
| 2015 | Byomkesh Bakshi | Mohini | | |
| 2015 | Room No. 103 | Ankita | | |
| 2016 | Byomkesh O Chiriyakhana | Damayanti | | |
| 2016 | Kiriti Roy | | | |
| 2017 | Ebong Kiriti | | | |
| 2017 | Byomkesh O Agnibaan | Bar dancer | | |
| 2017 | The Handkerchief | | Short | |
| 2018 | Pornomochi | | | |
| 2019 | Shankar Mudi | Ladies' Tailor owner | | |
| 2019 | Bhalobashar Shohor: Shorshe Ilish | Alo | Short | |
| 2021 | Golper Mayajaal | | | |
| 2021 | The Darling Wife | Pari | | |
| 2022 | Kadambari Aajo | | | |
| 2022 | Akash Ongshoto Meghla | Alpana | | |
| 2022 | Flat Theke Paliye | | | |
| 2023 | Dafaan | | | |

== Web series ==
| Year | Title | Role | Language | Platform |
|---|---|---|---|---|
| 2018 | Charitraheen | | Bengali | Hoichoi |
| 2019 | Bou Kenu Psycho | | Bengali | Hoichoi |
| 2019 | Britto | | Bengali | Addatimes |
| 2020 | Pabitra Puppies | | Bengali | Hoichoi |
| 2020 | Mafia | Bidua | Bengali | ZEE5 |
| 2021 | Hai Tauba | | Hindi | ALTBalaji |
| 2021 | Crimes and Confessions | | Hindi | ALTBalaji |
| 2021 | Nakaab | Vibha Dutta | Hindi | MX Player |
| 2022 | Danny Detective Inc. | | Bengali | Klikk |
| 2023 | Seven | Riya | Bengali | ZEE5 |

== Television ==
| Year | Title | Role | Channel | Ref |
|---|---|---|---|---|
| 2009-2014 | Agnipariksha | Madhura | Zee Bangla | |
| 2009-2013 | Binni Dhaner Khoi | Saraswati Mukherjee aka Gini | ETV Bangla | |
| 2011-2015 | Ishti Kutum | Prof. Kamalika Mukherjee (née Majumdar) aka Mun | Star Jalsha | |
| 2016 | Rajbari Rohosso | | Akash Aath | |
| 2018-2019 | Bhoomikanya | Netra | Star Jalsha | |
| 2018-2019 | Phagun Bou | Brishtilekha Mallick aka Brishti | Star Jalsha | |
| 2019 | Mohor | Kamalini | Star Jalsha | |
| 2019 | Kagojer Nouko | | Sananda TV | |
| 2020-2021 | Prothoma Kadambini | Anandibai Gopalrao Joshi | Star Jalsha | |
| 2022-2023 | Indrani | Indrani Roy | Colors Bangla | |
| 2023-2025 | Jhanak | Aparajita "Appu" Bose | StarPlus | |
