= Devara Kannu =

- Directed by: Y. R. Swamy
- Written by: Dr. Nihar Ranjan Gupta (Based on Bengali Novel)
- Starring: Lokesh; Aarathi; Anant Nag; Ambareesh
- Cinematography: R. Chittibabu
- Edited by: P. Bhakthavathsalam
- Music by: T. G. Lingappa
- Production company: Sri Bhagavathi Productions
- Distributed by: Sri Bhagavathi Productions
- Release date: 3 December 1975
- Running time: 129 min
- Country: India
- Language: Kannada

Devara Kannu ( transl. God's eye) is a 1975 Indian Kannada-language film, directed by Y. R. Swamy. The film stars Lokesh and Aarathi, in lead roles with Anant Nag and Ambareesh, who were relative newcomers, in supporting roles. The film has musical score by T. G. Lingappa. The film is based on a Bengali novel by Dr. Nihar Ranjan Gupta. The film was remade in Tamil as Annan Oru Koyil, in Malayalam as Ellaam Ninakku Vendi and in Telugu as Bangaru Chellelu.

== Plot ==
This is a murder mystery where Ramesh (Lokesh) is on the run from the police as he is accused of murdering his sister's rapist (Ambareesh). He runs into Sandhya (Aarathi) who should have been his fiance, at a lonely railway station. His sister (Jayalakshmi) now has amnesia. Together with her doctor husband (Anant Nag) Sandhya sets out to unravel the sequence of events that can save Ramesh. A last minute confession by the sister brings the film to a satisfactory end.

== Cast ==
- Lokesh as Dr. Ramesh
- Aarathi as Sandhya
- Anant Nag as Dr. Anand
- Ambareesh as Sridhar
- Jayalakshmi as Rekha
- Venkatarao Thalageri
- Dheerendra Gopal as Peter
- Shakti Prasad as Sandhya's uncle
- M. N. Lakshmi Devi as Sandhya's aunt
- Rama Prabha
- N. S. Rao as Ranga
- Sharapanjara Iyengar
- Thyagaraj Urs
- Kannada Raju
- Kunigal Ramanath
- Vijayakala
- Baby Shyam
- Leena Das

== Soundtrack ==
The music was composed by T. G. Lingappa.

No.	Song	Singers	Lyrics	Length (m:ss)
1	"Naguvina Aluvina"	K. J. Yesudas	Vijaya Naarasimha	03:36
2	"Ninna Neenu Maretharenu"	S. P. Balasubrahmanyam	Chi. Udaya Shankar	03:19
3	"O Iniya Nee Yelliruve"	P. Susheela	Vijaya Narasimha	03:12
4	"Ninna Neenu Maretharenu"	P. Susheela	Vijaya Narasimha	03:19
5	"Ninne Sanje Alli Nodide"	Vani Jairam	Chi. Udayashankar	03:28
