= Ellaam Ninakku Vendi =

- Directed by: J. Sasikumar
- Written by: Nihar Ranjan Gupta
- Screenplay by: S. L. Puram Sadanandan
- Produced by: T. E. Vasudevan
- Starring: Prem Nazir; Srividya; Sukumaran; Sumalatha
- Cinematography: Rajkumar
- Edited by: B. S. Mani
- Music by: V. Dakshinamoorthy
- Production company: Jaijaya Combines
- Distributed by: Jaijaya Combines
- Release date: 9 May 1981
- Country: India
- Language: Malayalam

Ellaam Ninakku Vendi is a 1981 Indian Malayalam-language film, directed by J. Sasikumar and produced by T. E. Vasudevan. The film stars Prem Nazir, Srividya, Sukumaran and Sumalatha in the lead roles. The film has musical score by V. Dakshinamoorthy. The film was a remake of Kannada film Devara Kannu originally based on a Bengali novel by Nihar Ranjan Gupta.

== Cast ==
- Prem Nazir as Dr.Rajendran
- Srividya as Jayalakshmi
- Sukumaran as Dr. Mohan Kumar
- Sumalatha as Sreedevi
- Jagathy Sreekumar as Kurup
- Adoor Bhasi as Panikkar
- Kottayam Santha as Bharati
- Sankaradi as Ammavan
- Alummoodan as Inspector
- Janardanan as Somarajan
- Lalu Alex as Unnikrishnan
- P. R. Varalakshmi
- Poojappura Ravi as Venu
- Paravoor Bharathan as Panchayath President
- K. P. A. C. Lalitha as Thankamani
- Kozhikode Siddique as Lawyer

== Soundtrack ==
The music was composed by V. Dakshinamoorthy and the lyrics were written by Sreekumaran Thampi and P. A. Sayyed.

No.	Song	Singers	Lyrics	Length (m:ss)
1	"Annante Hridayamallo"	Vani Jairam	Sreekumaran Thampi	
2	"Annante Hridayamallo"	K. J. Yesudas	Sreekumaran Thampi	
3	"Kamukane"			
4	"Kandappol"	K. J. Yesudas, C. O. Anto	P. A. Sayyed	
