= Sangabora =

- Theatrical release poster
- সঙ্গাবোরা
- Directed by: Bulan Bhattacharjee
- Written by: Bulan Bhattacharjee
- Screenplay by: Sushanta Bhattacharjee
- Produced by: Prashantbhai Haradhan Kundu
- Cinematography: Sunirmal Majumdar
- Edited by: Tapas Chakraborty
- Music by: Raja Narayan Deb
- Production company: Shiv Shakti Creation
- Distributed by: A Raa Info and Entertainments
- Release date: 25 March 2016
- Running time: 142 minutes
- Country: India
- Language: Bengali

Sangabora is a 2016 Indian Bengali-language adventure film written and directed by Bulan Bhattacharjee. Starring Soumitra Chatterjee, Samadarshi Dutta and Bidita Bag, the film explores the adventures of a college-goer and his team as they find a mysterious stone which turns out to be a treasure map.

Sangabora premiered at Priya Cinema, Kolkata and opened in limited release on 25 March 2016.

== Plot ==
Following puzzling events involving the disappearance of two documentary filmmakers; Arka, a college-goer, comes across a village where an ancient stone was recently discovered. He finds a primeval inscription on the stone and decides to investigate further with the aid of his maternal uncle and Barsha, a linguist. After a strange turn of events which connects the stone to the missing filmmakers; they set out for a mission to find them, leading them to a remote village named Gorang. They soon realize that they are being hunted by a gang who were after the stone, since it was nothing but a treasure map.

== Cast ==
- Soumitra Chatterjee
- Samadarshi Dutta
- Bidita Bag
- Kaushik Sen
- Kharaj Mukherjee
- Priyanshu Chatterjee as Anirban (Character Role of a Film Maker)
- Sampurna Lahiri

== Production ==
Made with a limited budget Sangabora was filmed at Gujarat, Kolkata, Mumbai and Visakhapatnam for over 32 days and was completed by October 2015.

== Release ==
A logo of the film was released on 18 February 2016, at the Kolkata Press Club. The poster was launched on 9 March 2016, at The Peerless Inn, Kolkata. The film had its theatrical release on 25 March 2016.

== Critical response ==
Professional ratings
Review scores
Source	Rating
NEWSMEN	1.5/5 stars
Dekh News	3/5 stars
Anandalok	4/5 stars

The film received mixed reviews from critics. Anusree Gupta of NEWSMEN wrote– "Sangabora promised a mix of adventure and mystery: it had a strong plot and talented actors, but the execution has been very poor." Applauding Kharaj Mukherjee's acting, Gupta stated that ill-timed shots and forced romance sequences pulled the quality down. Chitra Home Chowdhury of Dekh News found Soumitra Chatterjee's performance "powerful" and wrote that the film was "beautifully picturized".

== Soundtrack ==
The soundtrack album for Sangabora was composed by Raja Narayan Deb, which includes three original songs and a theme song. Shreya Ghoshal, Javed Ali, Neeti Mohan, Timir Biswas, Kaushik Chakraborty and Arko Mukherjee contributed to the vocals.
