= Pushpanjali (1972 film) =

- Directed by: J. Sasikumar
- Written by: Nihar Ranjan Gupta; Sreekumaran Thampi (dialogues)
- Screenplay by: Sreekumaran Thampi
- Produced by: P. V. Sathyam
- Starring: Prem Nazir; Vijayasree
- Cinematography: V. Namas
- Edited by: K. Sankunni
- Music by: M. K. Arjunan
- Production company: Azeem Company
- Distributed by: Azeem Company
- Release date: 18 February 1972
- Country: India
- Language: Malayalam

Pushpanjali is a 1972 Indian Malayalam-language drama film directed by J. Sasikumar and produced by P. V. Sathyam. The film stars Prem Nazir (in triple roles) and Vijayasree in the lead roles. The film has musical score by M. K. Arjunan. The film was a remake of the Bengali film Uttar Falguni based on the story of Dr. Nihar Ranjan Gupta.

== Cast ==
- Prem Nazir as Thampi/Ravi/Chandran
- Vijayasree as Usha
- Kaviyoor Ponnamma as Thampi's Wife
- Adoor Bhasi as Pachupilla
- Jose Prakash as Damu
- Prema as Renuka
- T. S. Muthaiah as Madhava Menon
- Sadhana as Salome

== Soundtrack ==
All lyrics are written by Sreekumaran Thampi; all music is composed by M. K. Arjunan.

| No. | Title | Artist(s) | Length |
|---|---|---|---|
| 1. | "Dukhame Ninakku" | K. J. Yesudas |
| 2. | "Nakshathra Kinnaranmaar" | P. Susheela |
| 3. | "Neelaraavinu Lahari" | K. J. Yesudas |
| 4. | "Pavizham Konduru Kottaaram" | K. J. Yesudas |
| 5. | "Priyathame Prabhathame" | K. J. Yesudas |
