= Aapko Pehle Bhi Kahin Dekha Hai =

- Theatrical Release Poster
- Directed by: Anubhav Sinha
- Written by: Shashank Dabral; Anubhav Sinha
- Produced by: Bhushan Kumar
- Starring: Priyanshu Chatterjee; Sakshi Shivanand; Om Puri
- Cinematography: Vijay Kumar Arora
- Edited by: Anupam Sinha
- Music by: Nikhil–Vinay
- Production company: T-Series Films
- Release date: 10 January 2003 (India)
- Country: India
- Language: Hindi

Aapko Pehle Bhi Kahin Dekha Hai (transl. I have seen you somewhere before) is a 2003 Indian Hindi-language comedy drama film directed and co-written by Anubhav Sinha and produced by Bhushan Kumar. It stars Priyanshu Chatterjee and Sakshi Shivanand in pivotal roles.

== Plot ==
The film is the story of a father, Sam, a successful Indian businessman and an overly protective father, who cannot accept the fact that his daughter Paakhi will get married and go away like other daughters. He believes no other man can love her as much as he does. But the inevitable happens.

Paakhi falls in love with Samar, a suspended cop who ends up in Calgary searching for a criminal, but Sam doesn't approve of him initially and takes a while to accept his future son-in-law. He eventually gives in to his daughter's wish and gets her married to the man she loves.

== Cast ==
- Priyanshu Chatterjee as ACP Samar Dev
- Sakshi Shivanand as Pakhi Shyam/Pakhi Samar Dev
- Om Puri as Shyam 'Sam'
- Farida Jalal as Asha 'Jiji'
- Pummy Brar as Rahim
- Navneet Nishan as Jinni
- Veerendra Saxena as Mohandas
- Manoj Pahwa as Aziz Khan
- Monami as Jinni's assistant
- Arundhati Ganorkar as Saira, Aziz's wife

== Soundtrack ==
Aapko Pehle Bhi Kahin Dekha Hai

Soundtrack album by Nikhil–Vinay
- Released: 2002
- Genre: Feature film soundtrack
- Label: T-Series

The album features 12 original songs composed by the duo Nikhil-Vinay, with lyrics written by Sameer. Harshdeep Kaur made her debut in the Bollywood film industry as a Hindi playback singer in "Sajna Main Haari."

#	Title	Singer(s)	Lyricist(s)
1	"Baba Ki Rani Hoon"	Alka Yagnik	Rajan Raj
2	"Barsaat"	Udit Narayan	Anand Bakshi
3	"Kuch Bhi Na Kaha"	Sonu Nigam, Anuradha Paudwal	Sameer Anjaan
4	"Aisi Aankhen Nahi Dekhin"	Jagjit Singh, Asha Bhosle	Sameer Anjaan
5	"Dil Gaya Kaam Se"	Alisha Chinai	Sameer Anjaan
6	"Kabhie Khan Khan"	Alka Yagnik, Udit Narayan, S. P. Sailaja	Rajan Raj
7	"Sajna Main Haari"	Harshdeep Kaur	Rajan Raj
8	"Ishq To Jaadoo Hai"	Sonu Nigam, Alisha Chinai	Sameer Anjaan
9	"Aapko Pehli Bhi Kahin Dekha Hai"	Alka Yagnik, Udit Narayan	Sameer Anjaan
10	"Aapki Yaad Aaye To" (Happy)	Sonu Nigam, Anuradha Paudwal	Sameer Anjaan
11	"Aapki Yaad Aaye To" (Sad)	Shaan, Anuradha Paudwal	Sameer Anjaan
12	"Chhote"	Sonu Nigam	Nitin Raikwar

== Reception ==
Taran Adarsh of IndiaFM gave the film 2 stars out of 5, writing, "On the whole, AAPKO PEHLE BHI KAHIN DEKHA HAI has a universally acceptable theme (a father's love for his daughter) that has been handled with sincerity. Despite a not-too-convincing screenplay, the film has its share of plusses in the form of competent performances, able direction, rich emotions, rib-tickling comedy and soulful music, besides the breath-taking locales of Canada. At the box-office, the film may find flavour with families. The fantastic promotion by its producers (Super Cassettes Industries Ltd.) will only add to its prospects." Ronjita Kulkarni of Rediff.com wrote, "All the characters, except Om Puri, are half-baked. The film has been shot entirely in Canada, and it must be said that the foreign actors are absolutely atrocious. Nikhil-Vinay's music is poor, except for Jagjit Singh and Asha Bhosle's exceptional ghazal Aisi aakhen nahin dekhi. The Hindi film industry has to wait yet another Friday for that elusive hit this year."
