= Kiriti O Kalo Bhromor =

2016 Bengali film

- Theatrical release poster
- Bengali: কিরিটি ও কালো ভ্রমর
- Directed by: Anindya Bikas Datta
- Screenplay by: Arijit Biswas
- Based on: Kalo Bhromor by Nihar Ranjan Gupta
- Produced by: Rupa Datta
- Starring: Indraneil Sengupta
- Cinematography: Harendra Singh
- Edited by: Sanjib Datta
- Music by: Debojyoti Mishra
- Production company: Camellia Productions Pvt. Ltd.
- Distributed by: Eros International
- Release date: 2016
- Country: India
- Language: Bengali

Kiriti O Kalo Bhromor is a 2016 Bengali language thriller film, directed by Anindya Bikas Datta and produced by Rupa Datta. The film version is based on Kalo Bhramar, the first detective novel introducing Kiriti Roy by Nihar Ranjan Gupta. Indraneil Sengupta played the role of Kiriti in this film. The film was released in 2016 under the banner of Camellia Films Private Limited.The music was released by Amara Muzik.

== Plot ==
This film starts with Dr. Sanyal, playing violin in his house. Mr. Dibraaj Mehta, a great parsee millionaire, visits the house of Kiriti Roy, a famous detective. He informs the later that " Kalo bhromor" is blackmailing him. But he has not received any demand of money from him. Meanwhile, some days ago his business partner, Nirod, died from dengue and his nephew is missing. He has arranged a party for introducing the new generation of their business.

Kiriti goes to the house of Mr. Nirod and discovers a lady with red hair, Farzaana. Then he goes to meet Dr. Sanyal to know the cause of his death.

On that evening, he attends the party to inform Mr. Mehta that he can't take his case as he is hiding so many facts. The later promises that he would tell everything. On that party, he is introduced to Dibraaj's daughter, Krishna. While Krishna was singing, Dibraaj goes to receive a call, but gets stabbed fatally. Kiriti finds a box with a black wasp (Kalo bhromor).

Kiriti meets Krishna and tells that he wants to meet the employees of his father's company. He there reveals that there was an illegal business behind that company and kalo bhromor joined hands with that business. After the meeting, Professor Kalidas Sharma comes to him and tells that he was going to leave that job because his research paper has been sanctioned in America. Kiriti wants to ask him more but he tells that he will talk to him the day after. Kiriti observes his house in disguise and notices the "moonlight killer", killing him. Kiriti tries to catch him red-handed, but gets stabbed in his arms. He shoots him in his leg, but still he manages to escape.

On next day, Police inspector Salil Sen comes to meet him and tells him that he is suspecting him to be moonlight killer due to his mobile tower location.krishna, being worried, comes to meet Kiriti. They both go to have a check-up to Dr. Sanyal. After coming home, he learns from Dinataran Chaterjee by forcing him that Farzaana is involved in kidnapping Subrata, Nirod's nephew. Kiriti shows the doctor's prescription to a handwriting expert from where he discovers that the handwriting has some signs of a criminal mind.

Kiriti goes to meet Farzaana, but is misled by a man who hits him on his head, leading to unconsciousness. But he wakes up, jumps from the car and shoots the goons. Finally he was successful to rescue Subrata. He gets a letter written by "kalo bhromor" and discovers that it is the handwriting of the same person who wrote the prescription. He, along with the police force, reaches Dr. Sanyal's house to arrest him, but he manages to escape. He spreads a poisonous gas, causing them to faint.

On the next morning, Kiriti rushes to the police station, after receiving a call from Dr. Sanyal, from where he discovers that Krishna is missing. Dr. Sanyal has sent some clues to Kiriti and challenges him to rescue her within 24 hours. Kiriti visits Dr. Sanyal's hospital and his house again, from where he becomes sure that "kalo bhromor" and moonlight killer are same person. He finally solves the riddle sent by doctor and reaches Barrackpore.

On the other hand, Krishna tries to escape from Dr. Sanyal, but fails. He tells Krishna that his father was bound to commit suicide for the betrayal of his three friends. Among them, he has punished the two to death. And now, he is going to kill the third one. He pushes an injection to her, leaving her asleep, feats a bomb and escapes. But Kiriti manages to rescue her.

Kiriti somehow realises that the MLA is the third target of Dr. Sanyal, who is now in Bolpur. He rushes there to make him alert. In the meantime, Subroto and Kiriti receives a letter of Dr. Sanyal that both he and Kiriti are very close to their targets. Kiriti rushes to the MLA's room, but finds him dead. He spots Dr. Sanyal and chases him, but doctor shoots him. However, Kiriti is able to shoot him and he fells into the river.

Krishna rushes to the Nursing Home where Kiriti was admitted. She asks him whether he had any problem if Krishna takes his responsibility. Kiriti asked what she meant to say, to which she replies that she hope he will solve this little mystery. At the same time, Inspector Basu informed him that Dr. Sanyal's dead body cannot be found.

Some years later, it is shown that Kiriti and Krishna is living a happy married life. Kiriti surprises Krishna with a jewellery set on the day of their marriage anniversary. While reading newspaper, Kiriti's eyes are stuck to a news and he rushes to an abandoned church, where he meets Dr. Sanyal again, as expected. He tells him that a father of a church rescued him that day and he now takes care of an orphanage. He tried to forget his past, but he was bound to murder the terrorists as they tried to harm the children of the orphanage. Meanwhile, the children come there and say that they will not leave their father. But suddenly the terrorists attack again and Kiriti wants to help Dr. Sanyal. Dr. Sanyal fights till the last, but gets shot by them and breaths his last.

On way back, Subrata asks Kiriti why he did not hand "kalo bhromor" to the police. He replied that,"kalo bhromor" is not a person, it's just a symbol.......a symbol of crime. And this "kalo bhromor" will remain forever in this world.

== Cast ==
- Indraneil Sengupta as Kiriti Roy
- Samadarshi Dutta as Subrata
- Arunima Ghosh as Krishna Roy (née Mehta)
- Kaushik Sen as Dr. Sanyal/Kalo Bhromor/Moonlight Killer
- Ratan Sarkhel as Inspector Salil Sen
- Pradip Mitra as Dibraaj Mehta
- Chandicharan as Minister Dinu Chaterjee/Amar Ray
- Niladri Lahiri as Prof. Kalidas Sharma

== Soundtrack ==
No.	Title	Artist
1	"Maya Rat"	Shalmali Kholgade
2	"Amar Mukti Aloe Aloe"	Anweshaa
3	"Likh Gaye Dastan"	Anweshaa
4	"Kalo Bhromor" Theme Music	

== Sequel ==
A sequel titled Nilacholey Kiriti released on 9 February 2018.
