= Ulka (novel) =

Bengali novel

- Author: Nihar Ranjan Gupta
- Language: Bengali
- Publication date: 1959
- Publication place: India

Ulka (transl. Meteor) is a Bengali novel by Nihar Ranjan Gupta published in 1959. This is one of the most adapted novel in the Indian film Industry and number of films in various languages were featured based on the plot of Ulka.

== Synopsis ==
The story centres on an innocent man who desperately attempts to reunite with his family, who had abandoned him.

== Adaptations ==
- Thayi Karulu (1962)
- Meri Surat Teri Ankhen (1963)
- Thayin Karunai (1965)
- Deiva Magan (1969)
- Raktha Sambandham (1984)
- Thaayi Mamathe (1985)
