= Jhumura =

2015 Indian Bengali film

- Directed by: Anindya Chatterjee
- Written by: Anindya Chatterjee
- Starring: Samadarshi Dutta; Sohini Sarkar; Sabitri Chatterjee; Kuchil Mukherjee; Sourav chakraborty (actor); Tania Kar
- Music by: Pijush Chakrabarty Subrata Das Brahma-Khyapa Ayan Banerjee
- Release date: 2015
- Running time: 113 minutes
- Country: India
- Language: Bengali

Jhumura (2015) is a Bengali film written and directed by debutant director Anindya Chatterjee and produced by Ultimax Productions Private Limited. This film is a lyrical saga that revolves around the life, love and struggles of Jhumur (a folk art form) performers of Bengal. The film features Samadarshi Dutta, Sohini Sarkar, Sabitri Chatterjee, Parthasarathi Chakrabarty and others. The film was released on 24 April 2015.

== Cast ==
- Samadarshi Datta as Riwk/Kanchan
- Sohini Sarkar as Sahana/Kusum
- Sabitri Chatterjee as Fullora
- Parthasarathi Chakrabarty as Guide/Palan
- Sourav Chakrabarty as Sandy/Nuna
- Tania Kar as Riya/Bakul

== Soundtrack ==
The music has been composed by Pijush Chakrabarty, Subrata Das, Brahma-Khyapa and Ayan Banerjee.

No	Title	Performer(s)
1	"Aankhite ki Bhab Jaane"	Nirmala Mishra
2	"Aankhite ki Bhab Jaane"	Somrita Bhattacharyya
3	"Aankhite ki Bhab Jaane"	Sayak Bandyopadhyay
4	"Chandra Soho Bongshidhoro"	Rupam_Islam
5	"Chandra Soho Bongshidhoro"	Somrita Bhattacharyya
6	"Chandra Soho Bongshidhoro"	Nirmala Mishra
7	"Komole Kamini"	Jojo

== Reception ==
Upam Buzarbaruah of The Times of India rated the film three-and-a-half out of five stars and wrote, "Over all, Jhumura is an emotional film, a bit on the slow side, but still engaging. So, for a change, go and watch something that is miles away from mindless violence and item numbers and indulge your finer senses. You won’t regret it."
