= Ebong Kiriti =

- Directed by: Anirban Paria
- Produced by: Babulal Sahoo
- Starring: Priyanshu Chatterjee; Moumita Gupta; Barun Chanda
- Release date: 31 March 2017
- Country: India
- Language: Bengali

Ebong Kiriti is a Bengali thriller drama film directed by Anirban Paria and produced by Babulal Sahoo. This film is based on a Kiriti Roy's story Ratibilaap by Bengali novelist Nihar Ranjan Gupta. It was released on 31 March 2017 under the banner of Dream Light Movie.

== Plot ==
The plot revolves around a murder that happens during a night party. Detective Kiriti Roy is present at the party. He starts investigation in his own way. He realises that everyone is hiding something or not confessing properly. Finally, he is able to track down the real culprit.

== Cast ==
- Priyanshu Chatterjee as Kiriti Roy
- Barun Chanda
- Koushik Kar as Ranjan Bose
- Saugata Bandyopadhyay as Subrata
- Moumita Gupta
- Biswajit Chakraborty
- Anirban Bhattacharya
- Ratan Kumar Panda as Reporter
- Arunava Chakraborty
- Sourav Chakraborty
- Ankita Chakraborty
