= Bhoomikanya =

- Genre: Drama; Comedy; Romance; Crime
- Written by: Rupak Saha
- Screenplay by: Kausik Bhattacharya, Padmanava Dasgupta
- Directed by: Arindam De
- Presented by: Nothing Beyond Cinema
- Starring: Sohini Sarkar; Kaushik Sen; Chiranjeet Chakraborty; Anirban Bhattacharya; Sudipta Chakraborty; Rupanjana Mitra; Ankita Chakraborty
- Theme music composer: Dipyaman Bhattacharya, Ujjaini Mukherjee
- Composer: Bickram Ghosh
- Country of origin: India
- Original language: Bengali
- No. of episodes: 162

Production
- Producer: Arindam Sil
- Production location: Kolkata
- Editors: Swapan Basu, Jishu Nath
- Camera setup: Dipyaman Bhattacharya
- Running time: 22 minutes

Original release
- Network: Star Jalsha
- Release: 30 July 2018 – 20 January 2019

Bhoomikanya is an Indian television drama series that was premiered on 30 July 2018 on Star Jalsha. The show portrays a modern adaptation of Rupak Saha's novel Tarita Puran.

Bhoomikanya is the television directorial debut for Arindam Sil The music was composed by Tabla player Bickram Ghosh. The title track is sung by Ujjaini Mukherjee.

== Plot ==
The story starts off with Tarita, a herpetologist returning home at Sundargarh in Odisha State. This area is the stronghold of Chandrabhanu. He is a local gangster who engages in human trafficking, corruption and illegal abductions. Maheshwar, the chief advisor to Chandrabhanu, prophesies the downfall of Tarita in the beginning of the series. She is assisted in her endeavors by Ankush, a forest ranger who is her love interest. Overall, the unfolding of this gripping tale, delineates the triumph of good over evil.

== Cast ==
- Sohini Sarkar as Tarita
- Kaushik Sen as Chandrabhanu
- Chiranjeet Chakraborty as Maheshwar
- Anirban Bhattacharya as Ankush
- Sudipta Chakraborty as Satima
- Rupanjana Mitra as Sanaka
- Ankita Chakraborty as Netra
- Rimjhim Mitra as Ankush's sister-in-law.
- Shakuntala Barua as Ankush's Grand-Mother
