= Thayi Karulu =

- Songbook cover
- Directed by: G. V. Iyer
- Written by: Nihar Ranjan Gupta
- Screenplay by: G. V. Iyer
- Produced by: G. V. Iyer
- Starring: Kalyan Kumar; Udaykumar; M. V. Rajamma
- Music by: G. K. Venkatesh
- Release date: 1962
- Country: India
- Language: Kannada

Thayi Karulu is a 1962 Indian Kannada-language film directed and produced by G. V. Iyer. The film stars Kalyan Kumar, Udaykumar, and M. V. Rajamma in the lead roles with a musical score composed by G. K. Venkatesh. The film is based on the Bengali novel Ulka by Nihar Ranjan Gupta, which was later adapted in Tamil in 1969 as Deiva Magan. In 1965 G. V. Iyer and Kalyan Kumar remade the Kannada film in Tamil as Thayin Karunai.

== Cast ==
- Kalyan Kumar
- Udaykumar
- M. V. Rajamma
- B.vijayalaxmi

== Soundtrack ==
The music for Thayi Karulu was composed by G. K. Venkatesh. There are claims that the song Baa Thaaye Bharathiye was originally written by TN Balakrishna when he learned of the birth of his daughter, who was named Bharathi. According to these claims, GV Iyer, a friend of Balakrishna asked for permission to use the song in the film, and Balakrishna agreed to let him use it, with Iyer credited as the lyricist.

No.	Song	Singers	Lyrics	Length (m:ss)
1	"Dhooradinda Bandavare"	L. R. Eswari	G. V. Iyer	03:16
2	"Baa Thaaye Bharathiye"	P. B. Srinivas	G. V. Iyer (Originally written by T. N. Balakrishna	
