= Utthaan =

- Directed by: Ujjwal Chatterjee
- Story by: Ujjwal Chatterjee (story); Dilip Shukla (screenplay)
- Produced by: Kumar Sanu
- Starring: Priyanshu Chatterjee; Neha Dhupia
- Cinematography: Vivek Banerjee
- Music by: Kumar Sanu
- Release date: 13 October 2006
- Country: India
- Language: Hindi

Utthaan is a Hindi film was directed by Ujjwal Chatterjee and produced by Kumar Sanu. The film stars Priyanshu Chatterjee, Neha Dhupia in the lead roles. The film's music is also by Kumar Sanu.

Kumar sanu produced the movie

== Cast ==
- Priyanshu Chatterjee as Prashant Bharti
- Neha Dhupia as Kiran Talreja
- Sudesh Berry as Miss Mumbai contest judge
- Kumar Sanu as Beauty contest judge
- Birbal as Farmhouse manager
- Preeti Puri as Neha Chaudhary
- Saroj Khan as Beauty contest judge
- Anang Desai as Chaudhary, Neha's father
- Veena Malik as Mrs. Talreja
- Anjan Srivastav as Shribhavna Prasad (Home Minister)

== Songs ==
1. "Ab Neend Kise Ab Chain Kahan O Jaan-E-Jaan" – Kumar Sanu, Alka Yagnik
2. "Abhi Tum Ho Kamsin" – Kumar Sanu, Sapna Mukherjee
3. "Chheente Hai Chain" – Hema Sardesai
4. "Yeh Kaisa Utthaan Hai" – Asha Bhosle
5. "Yeh Kaisa Utthaan Hai" – Sonu Nigam
