= Annan Oru Koyil =

- Theatrical release poster
- Directed by: K. Vijayan
- Screenplay by: Vietnam Veedu Sundaram
- Story by: Nihar Ranjan Gupta
- Produced by: Santhi Narayanasamy; T. Manohar
- Starring: Sivaji Ganesan; Sujatha; Sumithra; Jai Ganesh
- Cinematography: G. Or. Nathan
- Edited by: B. Kanthasamy
- Music by: M. S. Viswanathan
- Production company: Sivaji Productions
- Release date: 10 November 1977
- Country: India
- Language: Tamil

Annan Oru Koyil (transl. The Elder Brother is a Temple) is a 1977 Indian Tamil-language drama film, directed by K. Vijayan and written by Vietnam Veedu Sundaram. The film stars Sivaji Ganesan, Sujatha, Suruli Rajan and Jai Ganesh. It became a blockbuster at the box-office, running for over 100 days all over Tamil Nadu. The film was a remake of Kannada film Devara Kannu.

== Plot ==
Dr. Ramesh dotes on his sister Lakshmi who practically worships her brother. One time, Basker, her friend, tries to rape her and she kills him in the process of defending herself but going into a catatonic state. Fearing that his sister will have to face the law, he takes the blame and starts to run from the law. He finds help in Janaki, his childhood lover while his colleague/junior Dr. Ananth takes it upon himself to get Lakshmi back from her current state. Will she recover and will the brother & sister reunite forms the rest of the story?

== Cast ==
- Sivaji Ganesan as Dr. Ramesh
- Sujatha as Janaki
- Sumithra as Lakshmi
- Jai Ganesh as Dr. Ananth
- Mohan Babu as Baskar
- Major Sundarrajan as Lawyer
- S. V. Ramadas as Janaki's guardian uncle
- V. R. Thilagam as Janaki's aunt
- Shanthi Williams as patient's mother
- Heron Ramaswamy as public prosecutor
- Thengai Srinivasan as Police Inspector
- Suruli Rajan as Constable Ranga
- A. Karunanidhi as Constable
- Manorama as Jayamuniyamma
- Premanand as Sankar
- ISR as Selvam
- Pushpamala as Police Inspector's wife
- Veeraraghavan as Station Master

== Production ==
The film began production under the title Enga Veettu Thangalakshmi; however, it was later changed to Annan Oru Koyil. The filming was held at Ooty, Coimbatore and Mysore. Ganesan's home, Annai Illam, features in the film.

== Soundtrack ==
The music was composed by M. S. Viswanathan, with lyrics by Kannadasan.

Song	Singers	Length
"Annan Oru Kovil"	P. Susheela	04:03
"Annan Oru Kovil"	S. P. Balasubrahmanyam	04:15
"Kunguma Kolagal"	Vani Jairam	03:04
"Maligai Mullai"	T. M. Soundararajan	04:45
"Naalupakkam Vedarundu"	S. P. Balasubrahmanyam, Vani Jairam	03:33

== Critical reception ==
Ananda Vikatan rated the film 53 out of 100, praising Ganesan's performance. Free India appreciated the photography and cast performances but was critical of a comedy episode involving Srinivasan, Suruli Rajan, Karunanidhi and Manorama, calling it outdated.
