= 61 Garpar Lane =

2017 Bengali film

- Directed by: Rajesh Dutta; Ipsita Roy Sarkar
- Produced by: Abhishek De Sarkar
- Starring: Soumitra Chatterjee; Priyanshu Chatterjee
- Release date: 17 February 2017
- Country: India
- Language: Bengali

61 Garpar Lane is a Bengali social drama film directed by Rajesh Dutta, Ipsita Roy Sarkar and produced by Abhishek De Sarkar. This film was released on 17 February 2017 under the banner of Actor Studio. Nachiketa Chakraborty is the music director of the movie.

== Plot ==
Eight tenants with their families live in an age old house of Jagadish Ghosh in Kolkata. Jagadish's only daughter Jhinuk is married to an engineer, Supratik and lives in Chandannagar. One day Supratik decides to sell the old property to a promoter Mr. Bajoria for a handful of money. Facing the crisis, those families join hands.

== Cast ==
- Soumitra Chatterjee as Late Jagadish
- Priyanshu Chatterjee as Supratik
- Manoj Mitra as Minu's father
- Chandrayee Ghosh as Minu
- Nachiketa Chakraborty in a special appearance
- Kharaj Mukherjee
- Sujan Mukhopadhyay
- Sudipta Chakraborty
- Chitra Sen
- Pushpita Mukhopadhyay
- Rajshree Rajbanshi as Jhinuk
- Anirban Guha as Minu's fiancé
- Ratan Sarkhel
- Sancharee Mukherjee
- Sumit Samaddar
