= Danny Detective Inc. =

Bengali web series

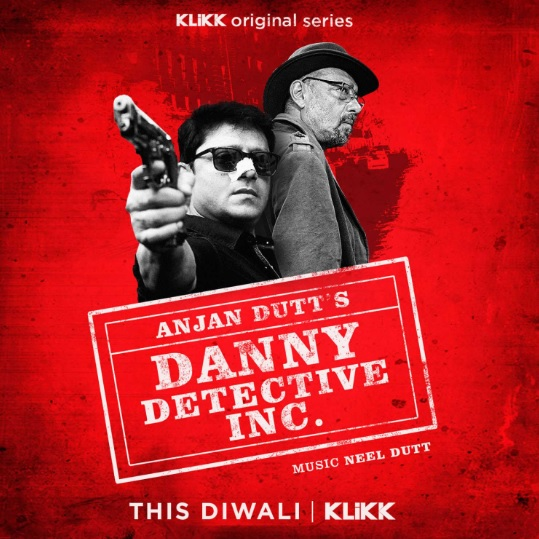
- Genre: Suspense & Thriller
- Directed by: Anjan Dutt
- Starring: Barun Chanda, Ankita Chakraborty, Anjan Dutt, Sudipa Basu, Suprobhat Das, Samadarshi Dutta
- Music by: Neel Dutt
- Country of origin: India
- Original language: Bengali
- No. of seasons: 1
- No. of episodes: 5

Production
- Producer: Santanu Chatterjee
- Cinematography: Pravatendu Mondal

Original release
- Network: Klikk
- Release: 2 November 2021

Danny Detective Inc. is a 2021 Bengali language thriller and suspense web series written and directed by Anjan Dutt.

The series starring Barun Chanda, Ankita Chakraborty, Anjan Dutt, Samadarshi Dutta, Sudipa Basu, and Suprobhat Das are in lead roles.

The whole story of the series is based on the book "Danny Detective Inc" written by Anjan Dutt.

Music of the series is composed by Neel Dutt and cinematography is done by Pravatendu Mondal.

== Cast ==
- Barun Chanda
- Ankita Chakraborty
- Anjan Dutt
- Sudipa Basu
- Suprobhat Das
- Samadarshi Dutta

== Synopsis ==
Reporter Subrata Sharma quits his job to work for Kolkata's Danny Detective Inc., a small-time detective service. His supervisor, Danny, is slain while working on an abduction case. Subrata is compelled to take on the case by circumstances. He goes to Dooars to investigate a major criminal organisation and apprehends the murderer. He assumes control of the organisation.

== Episodes ==
No.	Title	Directed by	Original release date
1	"The Agency"	Anjan Dutt	2 November 2021
A case is given to the unassuming company Danny Detective Inc. Danny passes away. Subrata Sharma, his secretary, is compelled to become involved.
2	"The Plot Thickens"	Anjan Dutt	2 November 2021
Traveling to the Dooars is required of Subrata. He is hired by a well-known tea estate owner to track down his son-in-murderer. law's He's assaulted.
3	"The Kidnap"	Anjan Dutt	2 November 2021
Subrata becomes engaged with the local criminal underworld and marries Pamela, the daughter of the tea estate owner. He is abducted.
4	"The Deadly Game"	Anjan Dutt	2 November 2021
Subrata is abducted by the underworld. Subrata makes them known. Shankar, an elderly local, perishes while attempting to provide Subrata with crucial case information.
5	"The Birth of a Detective"	Anjan Dutt	2 November 2021
Subrata goes back to the owner of the tea estate to tell him the truth, and he also manages to apprehend Danny's killer. He takes over the organisation.

== Soundtrack ==
1. Danny Detective INC (Original Score from the series)

No.	Title	Singer(s)	Length
1	Ek Cup Cha	Anjan Dutt, Neel Dutt	3:56
		Total Length	3:56
