= Biler Diary =

- Poster of Biler Diary
- বিলের ডায়েরী
- Directed by: Biswarup Biswas
- Written by: Biswarup Biswas
- Cinematography: Supriyo Dutta
- Edited by: Susanta Chakraborty
- Music by: Raja Narayan Deb
- Release date: 1 December 2017
- Running time: 152 minutes
- Country: India
- Language: Bengali

Biler Diary (Bile's Diary) is 2017 Indian Bengali drama film written and directed by Biswarup Biswas. Starring Biswanath Basu and Samadarshi Dutta, the film provides a peek into the lives of students of residential school Ramakrishna Mission Vidyalaya, Narendrapur through the eyes of a graduate who reminisces about his time there.

== Plot ==
The film begins with a 'retreat', in which alumni from different batches of a residential school have travelled to their alma mater for a reunion. Anabil, one of the alumnae, is presently working with UNICEF India as a "child protection specialist". He narrates the story of his childhood days. When he was admitted to the residential school by his parents, Anabil was a shy student with below-average abilities. For such a child, time table-specific, demanding hostel life was not easy. A mischievous senior student named Bishey and his gang added to Anabil’s woes. Due to similarity in names, Anabil was nicknamed 'Beelay' (the pet name of Swami Vivekananda) by his seniors. With the passage of time when it was almost certain that Anabil would fail to adapt, a new monk arrives as the hostel-warden. The new monk 'Kanu da', by virtue of his gentle qualities, becomes Anabil's inspiration. The little boy seems to have become enlightened and starts showing signs of development. At about this time, Anabil finds a magical diary that completely changes his life. As the film progresses, the secret of this mysterious diary slowly unfolds.

== Cast ==
- Biswanath Basu as Kanu Maharaj
- Samadarshi Dutta as Anabil
- Sanjib Banerjee as Shantanu Master
- Sanjay Biswas as Bahadur Da
- Palash Adhikari as Doi
- Aditya Pratap Singh as Junior Anabil
- Sumit Samaddar as Senior Bishey
- Avrendu Majumdar as Senior Bheto
