= Kaviya Thalaivi =

1970 film by K. Balachander

- Theatrical release poster
- Directed by: K. Balachander
- Screenplay by: K. Balachandar
- Based on: Uttar Falguni by Nihar Ranjan Gupta
- Produced by: Sowcar Janaki
- Starring: Gemini Ganesan; Sowcar Janaki
- Cinematography: N. Balakrishnan
- Edited by: N. R. Kittu
- Music by: M. S. Viswanathan
- Production company: Selvi Films
- Distributed by: Sree Balaji Movies
- Release date: 29 October 1970
- Running time: 166 minutes
- Country: India
- Language: Tamil

Kaviya Thalaivi (/ˈkɑːviə θəˈlaɪvi/ transl. Epic Heroine or Queen of Arts) is a 1970 Indian Tamil-language film, written and directed by K. Balachander and produced by Sowcar Janaki. It is a remake of the 1963 Bengali film Uttar Falguni. Janaki also stars alongside Gemini Ganesan, Ravichandran and M. R. R. Vasu. The film was released on 29 October 1970, Diwali day, and became a success. For his performance, Ganesan won the Tamil Nadu State Film Award for Best Actor.

== Plot ==
Devi is in love with Suresh, a lawyer, but is forced to marry Paranthaman, an alcoholic gambler. Devi escapes from him, and obtains work as a dancer in Hyderabad where she gives birth to a daughter named Krishna. When Vasu tries to kidnap the child, she has Suresh adopt her. Later, Vasu's blackmail threatens Krishna's marriage and Devi kills him.

== Cast ==
- Gemini Ganesan as Suresh
- Sowcar Janaki as Devi and Krishna
- Ravichandran
- M. R. R. Vasu as Paranthaman
- S. Varalakshmi
- Lakshmi Prabha
- V. Nirmala
- Baby Dolly

== Production ==
Kaviya Thalaivi is a remake of the 1963 Bengali film Uttar Falguni, and was produced by Sowcar Janaki under the banner Selvi Films; she also starred in dual roles. The screenplay for the remake was written by K. Balachander, who also directed. Cinematography was handled by N. Balakrishnan, and the editing by N. R. Kittu.

== Soundtrack ==
The music was composed by M. S. Viswanathan, and the lyrics were written by Kannadasan. The song "Oru Naal Iravu" is set in the Carnatic raga known as Sumanesaranjani.

Song	Singer	Length
"Kaiyodu Kai Serkkum"	P. Susheela	03:50
"Oru Naal Iravu"	P. Susheela	04:24
"Nerana Nedunsalai"	M. S. Viswanathan	03:15
"Kavithaiyil Ezhuthiya"	S. Varalakshmi, P. Susheela	02:39
"Aarambam Indre Agattum"	S. P. Balasubrahmanyam, L. R. Eswari	03:21
"Nalam Ketka" (Penn Partha Mappillai)	P. Susheela	04:22
"En Vaanathil Aayiram"	P. Susheela	05:30

== Release and reception ==
Kaviya Thalaivi was released on 29 October 1970, Diwali day, and distributed by Sree Balaji Movies. The Indian Express wrote, "Sowcar Janaki in the dual role gives a sterling performance. Gemini Ganesh, after a long break, comes into his own and is highly satisfactory. K. Balachander's dialogue has flashes of brilliance." It emerged a commercial success, and Ganesan won the Tamil Nadu State Film Award for Best Actor.

== Legacy ==
Film historian Mohan Raman described Kaviya Thalaivi as one of Janaki's "exceptional performances". Janaki also named the film as among her personal favourites.

== Bibliography ==
- Rajadhyaksha, Ashish; Willemen, Paul (1998) [1994]. Encyclopaedia of Indian Cinema. British Film Institute and Oxford University Press. ISBN 0-19-563579-5.
