= Nakaab (Indian TV series) =

2021 Indian web series

- Genre: Crime, Thriller, Action
- Written by: Pratik Thakare; Saurav Mohapatra
- Directed by: Debarati Gupta; Soumik Sen; Ronty Sheikh
- Starring: Gautam Rode; Ankita Chakraborty; Chandra Shekhar Dutta; Esha Gupta; Mallika Sherawat; Rohini Chatterjee; Rohit Basfore
- Country of origin: India
- Original language: Hindi
- No. of seasons: 1
- No. of episodes: 8

Production
- Producers: Soumya Mukhopadhyay; Shayon Chakraborty
- Camera setup: Multi-camera
- Running time: 30
- Production companies: Cherrypix Movies; MX Player; The Zoom Studios

Original release
- Network: MX Player
- Release: 15 September 2021

Nakaab (2021) is an Indian Hindi language crime, thriller, action web series written by Saurav Mohapatra and directed by Debarati Gupta, Soumik Sen and Ronty Sheikh. It stars Gautam Rode, Mallika Sherawat, Esha Gupta, Ankita Chakraborty, Chandra Shekhar Dutta, Rohini Chatterjee and Rohit Basfore.

== Plot ==
The web series is about the mystery behind murder of an actress. Police officer Aditi Amre, who is appointed the lead investigator, finds shocking information on the actress.

== Cast ==
- Ankita Chakraborty as Vibha Dutta
- Esha Gupta as Aditi Amre
- Mallika Sherawat as Zohra Mehra
- Gautam Rode as Pawan Bisht
- Chandra Shekhar Dutta as Vinod Amre
- Rohini Chatterjee as News 365 Anchor
- Rohit Basfore as Shravan Kumar

== Release ==
Nakab trailer was released on 7 September 2021 and the web series was released on MX Player on 15 September 2021.

== Reception ==
Subhash K. Jha for SKJBollywoodnews rated 1/2 star and wrote "It wouldn’t be right to ask what is wrong with Nakaab. It would be better to ask, what is right with it.The answer is, nothing! Every aspect of this tawdry trashy series deserves to be hooted and booted."

Himesh Mankad for Pinkvilla wrote "The first episode is full of cliches – the powerful using their power to close the case, a junior level cop planning to run a parallel investigation going against the norm, a backstory to the TV star and of course, the dirty world of showbiz."

Scroll.in staff found resemblance to death of Sushant Singh Rajput and wrote "The series clearly intends to resonate with the death by suicide of Sushant Singh Rajput. Nakaab ventures to say something important about the seamy side of showbiz, but ends up being an exercise in cashing in on a tragedy."

Shaheen Irani of OTTplay wrote "Zohra Mehra (Mallika Sherawat) gives a powerful performance. While being sensual, she also looks dangerous and scary."

Shwetank Shekhar of TheLallantop wrote "Nakab has nothing new to offer to the audience, but one should watch the series if it's watchable."
