= Kalo Bhramar =

Indian detective novel

Kalo Bhramar (The Black Wasp) is an epic Bengali detective novel. This is the first detective story introducing detective Kiriti Roy by Nihar Ranjan Gupta. The book was written in the 1930s and divided into 4 volumes when it was published in 1963, Mitra And Ghosh Publishers published the book.

== Synopsis ==
Kalo Bhramar is a pet name of one genius doctor Mr. Sanyal. But he was a serial killer. He became criminal in the eye of law due to the circumstances but he has a Robinhood type image among the poor people. He commits serial killing and each time flees from the hand of British police. Mysterious Kalo Bhramar challenges famous Detective Kriti Roy and his assistant Subrato. They tries to catch him up and move to Burma. A long running cat and mouse game begins.

== Film adaptation ==
In 2016, a Bengali language thriller film Kiriti O Kalo Bhromor was released loosely following this novel. The film was directed by Anindya Bikas Datta. Indraneil Sengupta and Kaushik Sen played the role of Kiriti Roy and Kalo Bhramar respectively.
