= Indrani (TV series) =

Bengali drama television series

- Genre: Drama; Romance
- Created by: Sumeet Hukamchand Mittal; Shashi Mittal
- Starring: Ankita Chakraborty; Rahul Ganguly
- Country of origin: India
- Original language: Bengali
- No. of seasons: 1
- No. of episodes: 265

Production
- Producers: Shashi Mittal; Sumeet Mittal
- Production location: Mumbai
- Camera setup: Multi-camera
- Running time: 21 min approx.
- Production company: Shashi Sumeet Productions

Original release
- Network: Colors Bangla
- Release: 18 July 2022 – 9 April 2023

Indrani is an Indian Bengali television series broadcast on Colors Bangla and digital platform Voot. Produced by Shashi Mittal and Sumeet Mittal under the banner of Shashi Sumeet Productions. It premiered on 18 July 2022. It stars Ankita Chakraborty and Rahul Ganguly in the lead role. It ended on 9 April 2023. The show repeated again on Colors Bangla on 22 July 2024, from Monday at 5.00pm to Sunday at 6.00pm.

== Plot ==
The show is based on Dr. Indrani Roy and a boy, Aditya.

== Cast ==
- Ankita Chakraborty as Indrani Roy – Piklu and Titli's mother -dilip's aka parichad's former wife, aditya's wife
- Rahul Ganguly as Aditya Purkayastha aka Adi - Angshu's son, Shibani's son, Sanchari's stepson, a medical student - indrani's husband
- Sambhabi Mukherjee as Paromita Roy aka Titli - Indrani and Dilip's daughter
- Soma Banerjee as Mitali Roy - Dilip's mother
- Bikash Bhowmik as Nikhil Roy - Dilip's father
- Sumanta Mukherjee as Mayukh Ranjan Purkayastha - Aditya's grandfather
- Deb Chatterjee as Angshuman Purkayastha aka Angshu - Aditya's father, Shibani's first husband, Sanchari's second husband
- Suchandrima as Sanchari Purkayastha - Aditya's stepmother
- Anindita Das as Swagata - Indrani's friend, a hospital employee
- Nayna Palit Bandopadhyay as Chanda Purkayastha - Angshu's sister
- Arijit Chowdhury as Dilip Roy aka Parijaat- Indrani's estranged and first husband, Piklu and Titli's estranged father (deceased)
- Sukanya Basu as Mohini - a hospital staff
- Unknown as Dr. Shibani Purkayastha - Aditya's mother, Angshu's first wife (deceased)
- Sakshi Roy as Dr.Nisha Roy
- Sangrami Rumpa as Shahana
