= Laadla (1966 film) =

- Poster
- Directed by: Krishnan–Panju
- Story by: Nihar Ranjan Gupta
- Produced by: A. V. Meiyappan
- Starring: Balraj Sahni; Nirupa Roy
- Music by: Laxmikant–Pyarelal
- Production company: AVM Productions
- Release date: 1966
- Country: India
- Language: Hindi

Laadla is a 1966 Hindi-language film directed by Krishnan–Panju and produced by AVM Productions. It is a remake of the Bengali film Maya Mriga (1960). Sudhir Kumar Sawant, who played the role in Dosti movie also played the role in this movie. The film is remembered for Balraj Sahni, Nirupa Roy and Sudhir Kumar class act.

== Synopsis ==
Seeta marries a poor man against her family's wishes and becomes pregnant. Savitri, her sister, is childless and yearns to have a baby so Seeta gives away her child to her sister. She names the child Darshan. Now what will be the result when Darshan will know about his real identity?

== Cast ==
- Balraj Sahni as Barrister Brijmohan
- Nirupa Roy as Savitri
- Pandari Bai as Seeta
- Manmohan Krishna as Ratanlal
- Sudhir Kumar as Darshan
- Kumud Chuggani as Varsha
- Jagdeep as Murli
- Mukri as Pandit
- Shammi as Dhanwanti

== Music ==
All songs are written by Rajinder Krishan.

| Song | Singer |
|---|---|
| "Dil Ae Dil Teri Manzil" | Lata Mangeshkar |
| "Meri Dua Le Ja Re" - 1 | Lata Mangeshkar |
| "Meri Dua Le Ja Re" - 2 | Lata Mangeshkar |
| "Kaun Tujhko Maa Kahega" | Lata Mangeshkar |
| "Paas Aakar To Na Yun Sharmaiye, Do Ghadi Ka Saath Hai, Ghul Jaiye" | Mohammed Rafi, Asha Bhosle |
