= A. Nagappa Chettiar =

- Born: 6 August 1915; Melasivapuri, British India
- Died: March 13, 1982 (aged 66)
- Occupation: Industrialist
- Awards: Padma Shri

A. Nagappa Chettiar (1915-1982) was an Indian industrialist and one of the pioneers of the Indian leather industry.

== Early life and career ==
Born on 6 August 1915 at Melasivapuri in Pudukkottai district in the Indian state of Tamil Nadu, Chettiar ventured into leather business which grew into a large trading group with presence in India and abroad. His efforts were reported behind the elimination of middlemen from the leather exports from India and he pioneered the concept of finished leather goods exports during a time when semi finished goods were the main leather export commodity.

Chettiar initiated the organization of an annual leather fair under the aegis of the Central Leather Research Institute which has grown to be the largest fair of its kind in Asia and he was one of the founding members of Leather Export Promotion Council of India. He died on 13 March 1982 at the age of 67.

== Awards ==
He was honoured by the Government of India in 1967, with the award of Padma Shri, the fourth highest Indian civilian award for his contributions to the society.

== See also ==
- Central Leather Research Institute
