= Samadarshi Dutta =

Bengali film actor

- Born: 2 May 1985 (age 40); Kolkata
- Occupation: Actor
- Spouse: Moumita Atarthi

Samadarshi Dutta is a Bengali film actor.

== Career ==
Dutta is a Film and Television Institute of India graduate. In 2011 he debuted in acting with Shiboprosad Mukherjee and Nandita Roy's film.

== Filmography ==
Year	Film	Director	Notes
2009	Saathi Aamar Bondhu Aamar	Anindya Sarkar	
2011	Hing Ting Chot	Anasua Roy Chowdhury	
2011	Ami Aadu	Somnath Gupta	National Film Award for Best Feature Film in Bengali
2011	Icche	Shiboprosad Mukherjee and Nandita Roy	
2012	Bhooter Bhabishyat	Anik Dutta	
2012	Khola Haowa	Anup Das	
2013	Nayika Sangbad	Bappaditya Bandopadhyay	
2013	Dekha, Na-Dekhay	Arnab Ghoshal	
2013	Kidnapper	Rupak Majumdar	
2013	Damadol	Manoj Michigan	
2013	Neel-Lohit	Bishnu Palchaudhuri	
2013	Jeevan Smriti	Rituparno Ghosh	Documentary on Tagore
2014	Roop Nagar Ke Cheeteh	Vipul Amrutlal Shah	
2014	Pendulum	Soukarya Ghosal	
2015	Jhumura	Anindya Chatterjee	
2015	Sesh Anka	Tathagata Banerjee	
2016	Sangabora	Arka	
2016	Kiriti O Kalo Bhromor	Anindya Bikash Dutta	
2017	Biler Diary	Biswarup Biswas	
2017	Chardiker Golpo	Pranabes Chandra	
2018	Nilacholey Kiriti	Anindya Bikash Dutta	
2018	Gobhir Gopan Brishti	Narottam Prasad Shil	
2020	Michhil	Surajit Nag and Ujjwal Basu	
2021	Danny Detective Inc.	Anjan Dutt	

== Web series ==
- Gangulys Wed Guhas (2021)
- Shwetkali (2023)
- Feluda ferot addatimes web series (2020)
