= Nihar Ranjan Gupta =

Indian dermatologist and novelist (1911–1986)

- নীহাররঞ্জন গুপ্ত
- Nihar Ranjan Gupta
- Born: 6 June 1911; Narail, Presidency Division, British India (Now Narail, Bangladesh
- Died: 20 February 1986 (aged 74); Calcutta, West Bengal, India
- Occupations: Physician, novelist, script writer
- Known for: Kiriti Roy

Nihar Ranjan Gupta (Bengali: নীহাররঞ্জন গুপ্ত, pen name: Banbhatta (বানভট্ট); 6 June 1911 – 20 February 1986) was an Indian dermatologist and a popular Bengali novelist. He is the creator of the fictional detective character Kiriti Roy. Some of his writings were made into films of Bengal and Bollywood.

== Early life ==
Gupta came from a Kabiraj family of Itna village under Lohagara police station, in the district of Jessore, presently in the Narail district of Bangladesh. He was born to Satya Ranjan Gupta and Labangalata Devi on 6 June 1911, in Narail district where his father used to work. He spent his childhood in Narail, due to his father's transferable job, he had to attend several schools, including Gaibandha High School. In 1930 he passed Matriculation from Konnagar High School. After completing his I.Sc. from Krishnagar Government College, Krishnanagar, he took admission to Carmichael Medical College. While a student at the college, his elder sister died of scorpion sting. Young Gupta vowed to earn higher degree in the medical sciences to serve the ill.

== Career ==
During the Second World War Gupta served as an army doctor and was posted to various places, including Chittagong, Burma and Egypt. After the war he completed post-graduate studies in the United Kingdom, specialising in dermatology. On his return he joined the Calcutta Medical College. In his career as a physician he was associated with several hospitals in India. After the Partition, his family permanently migrated to Kolkata in 1947.

As a child Gupta always dreamed of becoming a writer. He once went to Shantiniketan to seek the blessings of Rabindranath Tagore and took his autograph. At the age of eighteen he composed his first novel, Rajkumar. After schooling, Gupta took admission in the Calcutta Medical College, then affiliated with the University of Calcutta. During his stay in England he developed a keen interest in detective stories and met Agatha Christie. After coming back to India, he wrote his first detective novel, Kalo Bhramar (meaning The Black Hornet), which launched his detective character Kiriti Roy [কিরীটী রায়]. In his literary career Gupta has composed over two hundred novels, plays, short stories and essays. The most popular among them are Ulka, Badshah, Lalubhulu, Uttarphalguni, Asti Bhagirathi Tire, Mayur Mahal, Devyani, Neeltara, Mayamriga, Komalgandhar and Nishipadma. Forty five of his novels have been made into Bengali and Hindi feature films in Tollywood and Bollywood respectively. He was also the editor of a children's magazine named Sabuj Sahitya.

== Legacy ==
In 1988, SM Sultan founded the Shishuswarga-2 at the ancestral house of Gupta in Itna. It was officially inaugurated on 24 November 1993, by the Mohammad Ali Hossain, the then district magistrate of Narail. However, the activities of the children's organisation ceased after the death of SM Sultan. The house became infested by bats and illegal betting syndicates. In 2003, the archaeological department of Bangladesh notified the acquisition of Gupta's ancestral house. As of 2017, the ancestral house of Nihar Ranjan Gupta lies in a dilapidated condition, and no repairs have been made.

== Adapted works ==
- Ulka (Bengali - 1957)
- Maya Mriga (Bengali - 1960)
- Thayi Karulu (1962) [Remade as Thayin Karunai (Tamil)]- Ulka
- Annai (1962) (Remake of the 1960 Bengali film Maya Mriga) - Story Credit
- Kunkhumam (1963)
- Meri Surat Teri Ankhen (1963) – Ulka
- Uttar Falguni (1963) (Remade as Mamta, Kaaviya Thalaivi and Pushpanjali)
- Badsha (1963 film) (Bengali - 1963)
- Tapashi (Bengali - 1965)
- Laadla (1966) (Remake of 1960 Bengali film Maya Mriga)
- Mere Lal (1966) (Remake of 1963 Bengali film Badsha)
- Nai Roshni (1967) (Remade as Poovum Pottum and Punyavathi)
- Deiva Magan (1969) [Remade as Thaayi Mamathe(Kannada) and Raktha Sambandham(Telugu)] - Ulka
- Devara Kannu (1975) [Remade as Annan Oru Koyil, Ellaam Ninakku Vendi and Bangaru Chellelu(Telugu)]
- Do Anjaane (1976) (Remade as Maavari Manchitanam and Aaseya Bale)– Ratrir Yatri
- Kalankini Kankabati (1981)
- Lalu Bhulu (1983)
- Kiriti O Kalo Bhromor (2016)
- Kiriti Roy (2016)
- Ebong Kiriti (2017)
- Nilacholey Kiriti (2018)
