= Meri Surat Teri Ankhen =

- Poster
- Directed by: R.K. Rakhan
- Based on: Ulka by Nihar Ranjan Gupta
- Starring: Ashok Kumar; Asha Parekh; Pradeep Kumar
- Edited by: Bimal Roy
- Music by: S. D. Burman
- Production company: Gee Pee Films
- Release date: 1963
- Country: India
- Language: Hindi

Meri Surat Teri Ankhen (transl. My Face, Your Eyes) is a 1963 Bollywood drama film directed by R.K. Rakhan, starring Ashok Kumar, Asha Parekh and Pradeep Kumar. The film is a remake of Bengali film Ulka (1957), which itself is based on the eponymous novel by Nihar Ranjan Gupta.

== Plot ==
Raj Kumar, a wealthy businessman, dislikes everything he deems ugly. When his wife Kamla becomes pregnant and gives birth to a darkskinned son, he asks the doctor Mathur to tell Kamla that the child was stillborn. Mathur gives the child to the Muslim couple Rahmat and Naseeban, who raise him as their own son. The child, who is named Pyare, accidentally burns their dwelling down, and Naseeban becomes a casualty. Rahmat relocates to his village when he raises Pyare as a musician. Years later, Rahmat dies, but not before informing Pyare that he is actually a Hindu. Mathur tells Pyare about his true family, and arranges a song and dance play where Pyare will perform, hoping that Raj will overcome his dislike for his now grown-up son. His efforts fail as Raj instead offers to pay compensation so that Pyare can look after himself. Pyare goes to Raj to return the money, at which point Kamla sees him and asks him not to leave and adopts him as her son. Later, Raj's other son Sudhir is kidnapped and held for ₹4 lakh (equivalent to ₹3.6 crore or US$380,000 in 2026) ransom. Sudhir's fiancée Kavita inaccurately believes that Pyare is behind this abduction. Will misfortune and tragedy also follow Pyare to his new-found family?

== Cast ==
- Ashok Kumar as Pyare
- Asha Parekh as Kavita
- Pradeep Kumar as Sudhir
- Kanhaiyalal as Rahmat
- Indira as Bela
- Tarun Bose as Dr. Mathur
- Achala Sachdev as Kamla
- Ishwarlal as Raj Kumar

== Production ==
Meri Surat Teri Ankhen is based on the Bengali novel Ulka.

== Soundtrack ==
Singers: Mohammed Rafi, Manna Dey, Mukesh, S. D. Batish, Suman Kalyanpur, Asha Bhosle, Lata Mangeshkar
Music: S. D. Burman
Lyricist: Shailendra

Track listing
No.	Title	Singer(s)	Length
1.	"Poochho Na Kaise Maine Rain Bitaayi" (Raga Ahir Bhairav)	Manna Dey	3:20
2.	"Puchho Na Kaise Maine Rain Bitayi (Sad)" (Raga Ahir Bhairav)	S. D. Batish and Manna Dey	2:16
3.	"Ye Kisne Geet Chheda" (Raga Kalavati)	Suman Kalyanpur and Mukesh	4:41
4.	"Tere Bin Soone Nain Hamare (Sad)" (Raga Pilu, with Kafi)	Mohammed Rafi	3:49
5.	"Tere Bin Soone Nain Hamare" (Raga Pilu, with Kafi)	Mohammed Rafi and Lata Mangeshkar	5:27
6.	"Naache Man Moraa Magan Dhigadhaa Dhigi Dhigi" (Raga Bhairavi)	Mohammed Rafi	4:40
7.	"Tere Khayalo Me Tere Hi Khawabo Me" (Raga Jaunpuri)	Lata Mangeshkar	4:23
8.	"Tujhse Nazar Milane Me"	Asha Bhosle	4:09
Total length:			32:45
