= Surajit Sen =

Indian physicist

- Born: November 28, 1960 (age 65); Calcutta (now Kolkata), India
- Education: University of Georgia (Ph.D., 1990)
- Known for: Non-equilibrium statistical physics, nonlinear dynamics, solitary waves in granular media
- Awards: Fellow of the American Physical Society (2008), Fellow of the American Association for the Advancement of Science (2012)
- Scientific career
- Fields: Physics
- Workplaces: State University of New York at Buffalo
- Doctoral advisor: M. Howard Lee

Surajit Sen (born November 28, 1960, in Calcutta (modern name Kolkata) in India) is a physicist who works on theoretical and computational problems in non-equilibrium statistical physics and in nonlinear dynamics of many body systems. He holds a Ph.D in physics from The University of Georgia (1990) where he studied with M. Howard Lee. He is also interested in applying physics to study problems of relevance in a societal context. He is a professor of physics at the State University of New York, Buffalo. Much of Sen's recent work can be found in his RUSA lecture at Bharatidasan University.

Sen is credited with developing an exact solution for the Heisenberg equation of motion in a quantum mechanical many body system in 1991. His studies include work on how solitary waves travel in alignments of elastic beads, on how they interact with one another and how these systems tend to reach an equilibrium-like state where equipartitioning of energy is not respected, which he called the quasi-equilibrium state. Suggestion of a similar state was made soon thereafter by Berges et al. Recently, Neyenhuis et al may have found some experimental evidence of this quasi-equilibrium/prethermalization state. Sen's Steel Institute colloquium at the Indian Institute of Technology, Bombay, captures some of his work on strongly nonlinear systems.

Recently, his group has also shown how the energy equipartitioned state may in fact be realized in these systems. In 1997, he investigated the possible use of sound bursts in detecting buried small landmines. In 2001, he introduced the tapered granular chain impact dispersion system, which has since been extensively probed. Sen has recently suggested that nonlinear systems may be used to extract mechanical energy from noisy environments and make them into useful energy. Sen's group has used cellular automata based simulations to model land battles between an insurgent army and an intelligent army and used molecular dynamics based simulations to examine the social structure of chimpanzee colonies. He has also been active in modeling partisan elections.

Sen was elected as a Fellow of the American Physical Society in 2008, for the discovery of how solitary waves break and secondary solitary waves form in granular media, for his leadership in organizing forums to represent and recognize the physicists from India and for raising consciousness about the problems and the importance of rural science education in India and the developing world. He was also elected as a Fellow of the American Association for the Advancement of Science in 2012 for pioneering research on solitary waves and their collisions in granular media and for sustained outstanding service and leadership in international physics.

In 2020-2021 he served as a Senior Science Advisor at the United States Agency for International Development while on leave as a Jefferson Science Fellow of the US National Academies. His work is summarized in a JSF Distinguished Lecture presented at the US National Academies https://vimeo.com/566681948. More recently, Sen served as a Distinguished Visiting Professor of Biosciences and Bioengineering at the Indian Institute of Technology Jodhpur, India, where one of his focus areas included studies on the nature of the urban areas in the east and the west, challenges to developing sustainable urban areas (https://www.youtube.com/watch?v=432db_23lYE&t=6s) and desert ecosystems.

== See also ==
- List of fellows of the American Physical Society (1998–2010)
