= Kiriti Roy (2016 film) =

- Directed by: Aniket Chattopadhyay
- Produced by: Ashok Dhanuka
- Starring: Chiranjeet Chakraborty; Locket Chatterjee; Swastika Mukherjee; Saayoni Ghosh
- Release date: 30 December 2016
- Country: India
- Language: Bengali

Kiriti Roy is a Bengali thriller drama film directed by Aniket Chattopadhyay and produced by Ashok Dhanuka. This film was released on 30 December 2016 in the banner of Eskay Movies. It is based on Nihar Ranjan Gupta's Kiriti Roy series, Setarer Sur.

== Plot ==
The film revolves around a story of love, jealousy and murder mystery. While walking in a street of Kolkata, Detective Kiriti Roy and his assistant Subrata save Sunil, who was administered a lethal dose of morphine. Kiriti thinks that there is a link between this incident and the very recent murder case of Basabi. Basabi was a beautiful young woman who was about to marry Brajesh but, before the wedding, she was found dead. Kiriti suspects Brajesh along with his four friends, including Sunil.

== Cast ==
- Chiranjit as Kiriti Roy
- Locket Chatterjee as Krishna
- Sujan Mukhopadhyay as Subrato
- Swastika Mukherjee as Junifer
- Kaushik Ganguly as Inspector Rathin Sikdar
- Saayoni Ghosh
- Kanchana Moitra
- Joy Badlani
- Krishnokishore Mukherjee
- Ankita Chakraborty
- Joy Badlani
- Debranjan Nag
- Soumyajit Majumdar
