= Aiburo Bhaat =

Bengali pre-wedding ritual

Aiburo Bhaat (Bengali: আইবুড়ো ভাত) is a traditional Bengali pre-wedding ritual where brides and grooms have a farewell meal at their parents homes. This ritual is observed two days before the wedding and is believed to bring good luck to the couple's future together.

== Etymology ==
"Aiburo" translates to young adult male or bachelor, and "Bhaat" means rice in Bengali, so it essentially refers to a pre-wedding rice-eating celebration, highlighting the importance of food in this ritual. The purpose of this ritual is to give the bride and groom a final bachelorette feast before the wedding.

== Culinary preparation ==
The Aiburo Bhaat menu is a Bengali feast, typically featuring:

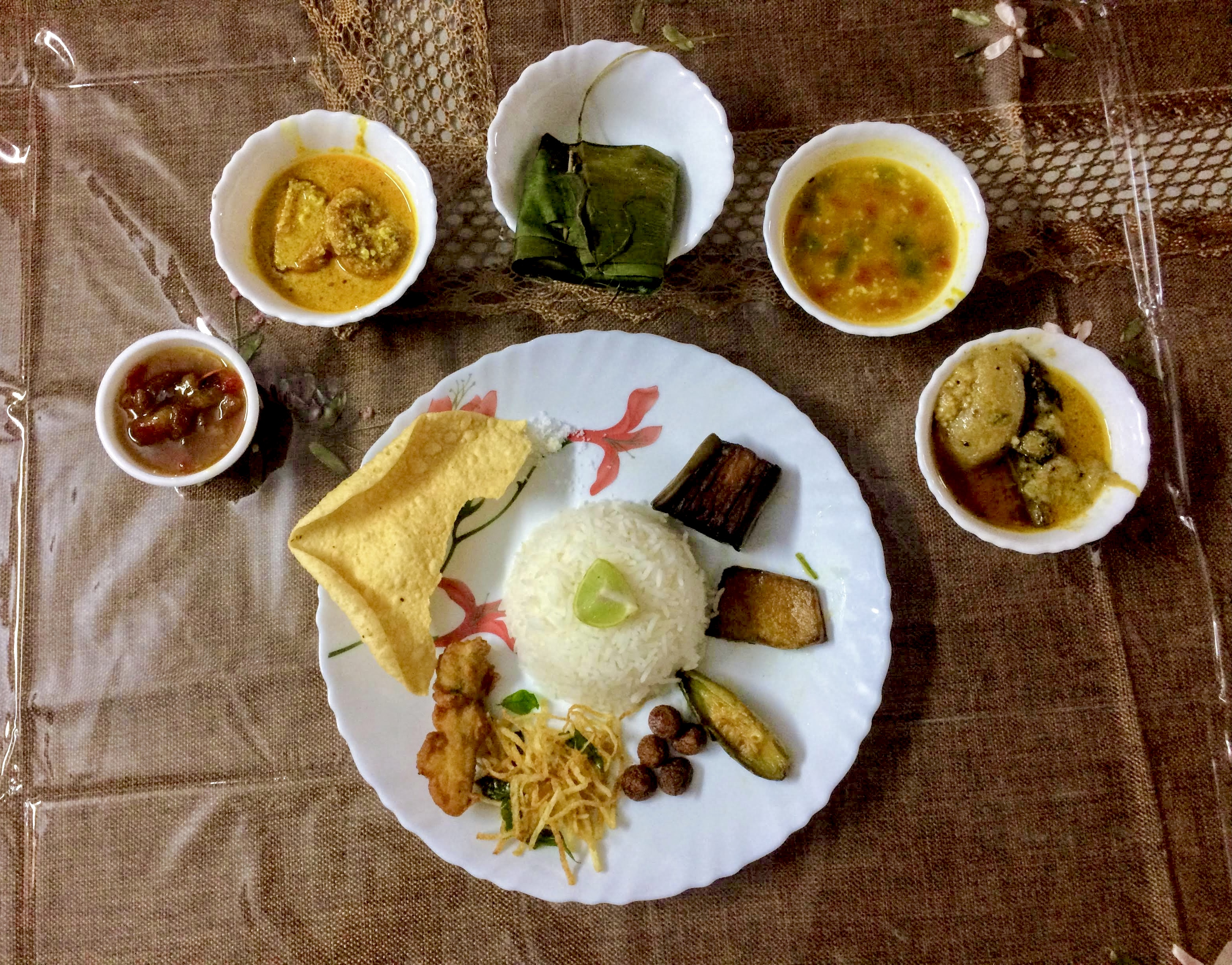

- Steamed Rice (Bhaat): The main dish, Steamed rice is served in a bowl-shaped plate, accompanied by various side dishes. It symbolises purity and prosperity.
- Dal: Lentils prepared in different styles.
- Paanch Rokom Bhaja: Five varieties of fried vegetables, like potatoes and beguni (deep-fried brinjal), etc.
- Sukto: A mixed vegetable dish considered auspicious.
- Fish Dishes: Examples include Shorshe Ilish (Hilsa with mustard) and Chingri Malai Curry (prawns in coconut cream), Mach bhajhi (fried fish) and macher matha (fish head).
- Meat Dishes: Such as Kosha Mangsho (slow-cooked mutton) and chicken dishes.
- Sweets: Desserts like Mishti Doi (sweet yogurt), Payesh and Rasgulla.

== Celebration ==
Aiburo Bhaat usually takes place one to three days before the wedding, mainly in afternoon. It is hosted by the bride's or groom's family for their relatives. Close friends and relatives of the bride and groom gather at their homes to offer gifts and blessings.

Before the meal, elder family members perform a ritual, placing durba grass and rice seeds on the couple's heads to bless them with prosperity and fertility. The female of the house often performs ulu dhwani, a traditional mouth sound, as a blessing during this ritual.

== See also ==
- Gaye Holud
- Bengali Hindu wedding
- Bengali Hindu
