= Indian Literature (journal) =

- cover page (Nov. Dec. 2008 issue)
- Subject: Literature
- Language: English
- Edited by: Antara Dev Sen

Publication details
- Publisher: Sahitya Akademi (India)
- Frequency: bi-monthly

Standard abbreviations
- ISO 4: Indian Lit.

Indexing
- ISSN: 0019-5804
- JSTOR: indilite
- OCLC no.: 1716981

Links
- Website

Indian Literature is an English language literary journal published bi-monthly by the Sahitya Akademi, India's National Academy of Letters. It was first launched in 1957, and is currently edited by British-Indian journalist Antara Dev Sen.

== History ==
The Sahitya Akademi first launched Indian Literature in 1957 as an annual publication in English. In an editorial note published in the first issue, in October 1957, the editors noted that since the inception of the Sahitya Akademi in March 1954, there had been demands at every General Council meeting that a journal should be established to disseminate information about literary developments in India. The purpose of Indian Literature, therefore, was initially established as a platform to help Indian writers and readers to become better acquainted with new literary works, particularly in translating and making accessible works of Indian literature. The editorial note also recorded that Indian Literature would document the work of the Sahitya Akademi. At the time of its launch, an annual subscription to Indian Literature cost Rs. 2.5.

The first editorial board of the journal consisted of three members; S. Radhakrishnan, the first vice-president of India, politician and author, Humayun Kabir, and K.R. Kripalani, with the latter acting as the editor. From 1965 onwards, in addition to the editorial board, the journal had a designated editor, starting with Bengali author and translator, Lokenath Bhattacharya. The current editor of the journal is Antara Dev Sen. Previous editors include A. J. Thomas, K. Satchidanandan, and H.S. Shivaprakash.

Issues of Indian Literature did not initially contain editorials, although from 1973, Keshav Malik began his tenure as editor with a prefatory note to each issue, containing general reflections on the state of Indian literature. In 1974, S. Balu Rao took over as editor from Keshav Malik, and in an editorial note, redefined the scope of Indian Literature, focusing more on translations to and from Indian languages. Editorial notes from S. Balu Rao became a regular feature, introducing the contents of each issue, and all editors since have continued to introduce each issue with an editorial note.

From 1959 Indian Literature was published bi-annually, instead of just annually, and from 1966 onwards, it became a quarterly publication. From 1979 onwards, it has been published on a bi-monthly basis.

The journal completed its 50th year in 2007. On this occasion Sahitya Akademi awarded the Indian Literature Golden Jubilee Translation Awards to the following poets:-

- Rana Nayar, for his translation of the verses of the Sikh saint Baba Farid from Punjabi.
- Dr Tapan Kumar Pradhan, for English translations of his own Odia poem collection, Kalahandi
- Paromita Das, for English translation of Parvati Prasad Baruwa's poems in Assamese.

=== List of editors ===
Members of the editorial board of Indian Literature have included K.R. Kripalani, S. Radhakrishnan, Humayun Kabir, Zakir Hussain, Suniti Kumar Chatterji, K.R. Srinivasa Iyengar, Prabhakar Machwe, R.S. Kelkar, Umashankar Joshi, V. K. Gokak, Birendra Kumar Bhattacharya, Gangadhar Gadgil, Indra Nath Choudhuri, U. R. Ananthamurthy, Ramakanth Rath, Gopi Chand Narang, and Sunil Gangopadhyay. Apart from the editorial board, the journal has also had editors, listed below.

Editor	Volumes and Issues	Date
K.R. Kripalani	Vol. 1(1) to Vol. 8(1)	1957 to 1965
Lokenath Bhattacharya	Vol 8(1) to 15(3)	1965 to 1972
Keshav Malik	Volume 15(4) - 27(2)	1972 - 1984
S. Balu Rao	Volume 27(3) - 31(2)	1984 - 1988
S. P. Jain (Honorary Editor)	Volume 31(3)	1988
D. S. Rao	Volume 31(4) - 34(5)	1988 - 1991
J. M. Mohanty	Volume 34(6) - Volume 35(3)	1991 - 1992
K. Satchidanandan	Volume 35(4) - 41	1992 - 1997
H. S. Shivaprakash	Volume 42(2) - 46(1)	1998 - 2002
Nirmal Kanti Bhattacharjee	Volume 46(2) - 51(2)	2002 - 2007
A. J. Thomas	Volume 51(3) - 52(5)	2007 - 2008
K. Satchidanandan (Guest Editor)	Volume 52(6) - 54(2)	2008 - 2010
Subodh Sarkar	Volume 54(3) - 55(3)	2010 - 2011
A. J. Thomas	Volume 55(4) - 57(1)	2011 - 2013
Yashodhara Mishra	Volume 57(2) - 59(3)	2013 - 2015
Subodh Sarkar	Volume 59(4) - 60(3)	2015 - 2016
A. J. Thomas	Volume 60(4) - present	2016 to present

== Contents and features ==
In addition to documenting the activities and publications of the Sahitya Akademi, Indian Literature also carries original works and translations of short fiction, poetry, plays, as well as literary criticism and reviews. In addition to Indian languages and literature, the journal periodically carries content about literature from other countries, as well as translations from foreign languages. From 1957 onwards, Indian Literature has featured a regular section titled, "A Review of Current Writing" which consisted of individual reports on new publications in multiple Indian languages. In 1965, this was renamed the "Annual Review of Indian Writing".

Sections such as "Bengali Literature" or "Urdu Literature" note new books, poetry, and reviews published in those languages. Frequent features also included similar sections documenting developments in other forms of literature, such as "Indian Drama and Stage Today", which contained a review of plays in Indian languages. Another regular feature is 'Authors on their Books', featuring commentary and notes by authors on recent publications, particularly those that won Sahitya Akademi Awards. From 1985, Indian Literature introduced an annual feature titled, 'Indian Literature in English': a bibliography of translations from Indian languages as well as critical works on Indian literatures, to be published in the first issue of each year.

From 1959 onwards, Indian Literature also began carrying reviews of books that had won Sahitya Akademi Awards in that year and occasionally also carried profiles of Sahitya Akademi Award winners. The Sahitya Akademi also uses the journal to publicize recent books published by the Akademi, which are often listed in the journal's front and back matter.

Indian Literature has also carried occasional special issues, dedicated to specific authors or themes, including an issue dedicated to Rabindranath Tagore in 1960, an issue dedicated to Shakespeare in India in 1964, an issue dedicated to Aurobindo in 1972; an issue dedicated to the Urdu short story in 1976; an issue dedicated to Oriya literature in 1979, etc.

== Notable contributors ==
Indian Literature primarily publishes Indian writers, although it has published works of other writers from other countries, from time to time. The first issue of Indian Literature, for instance, featured an essay by Philip Young on American poetry in the twentieth century, as well as works by Čedomir Minderović and Seijiro Yoshizawa. Notable contributors include:

- Rabindranath Tagore
- S. Radhakrishnan
- K. M. Panikkar
- R. K. Narayan
- Satyajit Ray
- Umashankar Joshi
- Khushwant Singh
- Mulk Raj Anand
- Jawaharlal Nehru
- Umashankar Joshi
- Suniti Kumar Chatterji
- V. K. Narayana Menon
- Jibananda Das
- Krishan Chander
- Balwant Gargi
- Zinda Kaul
- Rahul Sankrityayan
- U. R. Ananthamurthy
- Ruskin Bond
- K. Satchidanandan
- Suryakant Tripathi
- Vijay Tendulkar
- Firaq Gorakhpuri
- Bhisham Sahni
- Makarand Paranjape
- C. Rajagopalachari
- O. N. V. Kurup
- Sundara Ramaswamy
- Kartar Singh Duggal
- Harivansh Rai Bachchan
- Ashokamitran
- Premchand
- Yashpal
- Nissim Ezekiel
- Indira Parthasarthy
- Ashok Vajpeyi
- Premendra Mitra
- Subramania Bharathi
- Saratchandra Chatterjee
- Kedarnath Singh
- Gopinath Mohanty
- Sudhindranath Dutta
- Toru Dutt
- Sudama Panday
- Intizar Hussain
- Shamsur Rahman
- Saadat Hasan Manto
- Manoranjan Das
- Upendranath Ashk
- A.K. Ramanujan
- Agha Shahid Ali
- Amrita Pritam
- Nayantara Sahgal
- Rajam Krishnan
- Qurratulain Hyder
- Nirmal Prabha Bordoloi
- Eunice De Souza
- Ranjit Hoskote
- Mahadevi Varma
- Mahasweta Devi
- Ashapurna Devi
- Indira Goswami
- Krishna Sobti
- Meena Alexander
- Pu La Deshpande
- Vishnu Sakharam Khandekar
- Dattaram Maruti Mirasdar
- Anita Desai
- Indira Devi Chaudhurani
- Agyeya
- Nabakanta Barua
- Jhaverchand Meghani
- Aldous Huxley
- Boris Pasternak
- Halldór Laxness
- Per Hallström
- Sándor Petőfi
- Stanislas Ostroróg
- Victoria Ocampo
- H. D. F. Kitto
- Muriel Clara Bradbrook
- David Daiches
- Robert Rozhdestvensky
- Endre Ady
- Nichita Stănescu
