= 2013 Kamduni gang rape and murder case =

Murder in West Bengal, India

2013 Kamduni Gang Rape and Murder Case
- Date: 7 June 2013
- Time: 2:30 pm IST (UTC+05:30)
- Location: Kamduni, North 24 Parganas, West Bengal, India
- Deaths: 1 (female victim)
- Accused: Ansar Ali; Saiful Ali; Aminoor Ali; Bhutto Molla; Enamul Molla; Amin Ali; Gopal Naskar; Bholanath Naskar

On 7 June 2013, a 20-year-old college student was abducted, gang-raped and murdered in Kamduni village, 16 km from Barasat, North 24 Parganas district about 20 km from main Kolkata. In January 2016 three accused were sentenced to death and another three to life imprisonment.

== Incident ==
The victim, Shipra Ghosh, a second year BA student of Derozio Memorial College was walking home along the Kamduni BDO Office Road in the afternoon, when she was abducted and taken inside a factory where she was gang-raped by eight men. After raping her, the perpetrators tore apart her legs up to the navel, slit her throat and dumped her body into a nearby field.

At around 8:30 PM local time, the brothers of the victim discovered the body of their sister alongside a bheri in the At Bigha region of Kharibari in Rajarhat. At around 9:45 PM, an altercation and subsequent skirmish occurred between the villagers and the police when the latter tried to recover the body of the victim. The crowd damaged three police vehicles. At around 2 AM, a large police contingent recovered the victim's body from the villagers and sent it to Barasat for postmortem.

On the evening of June 15, a contingent of the Indian Reserve Battalion started flag march in Kamduni. In spite of the paramilitary vigil a team of Citizen's Forum visited Kamduni. Several women's organizations, including Matangini Mahila Samiti, Maitri, Manabi, Ahalya and Chetana, visited Kamduni.

On 17 June, Mamata Banerjee, the Chief Minister of West Bengal visited Kamduni. She promised that charge sheet would be produced against the arrested within 15 days of the incident and that her government would plead for the capital punishment of the culprits.

== Arrest and prosecution ==
The residents of Kamduni caught hold of Ansar Ali, the prime accused, and handed him over to the police. After interrogation, he confessed to having committed the crime along with four others. Five persons were named in the FIR (First information report). Based on that, the district police arrested three persons in the early hours of 8 June.

The case was investigated by the CID, West Bengal. On 16 June, the CID officers took the eight accused to Kamduni to reconstruct the incident amid tight security by the police and Indian Reserve Battalion. For 45 minutes, the accused recounted how they had gang raped and then murdered the victim, throwing her body over the set wall afterwards. Even fifteen days after the incident, no charge sheet was filed. On 22 June, Ansar Ali was remanded in judicial custody for 14 days. The accused and State Govt. wanted the legal proceedings shifted from Barasat court.

Finally, in January 2016, the accused were sentenced - some were sentenced to death and others to life imprisonment. Additional Sessions Judge Sanchita Sarkar handed out a death sentence to Ansar Ali, Saiful Ali and Aminul Ali, while Emanul Islam, Aminur Islam and Bhola Naskar were sentenced to life imprisonment for the gang-rape and murder of Shipra Ghosh on 7 June 2013.

However, on 6 October 2023, a divisional bench of the Calcutta High Court, comprising Justices Joymalya Bagchi and Ajay Kumar Gupta acquitted Imanul Islam, Aminul Islam and Bhola Naskar of the charge of gangrape, while convicting them for criminal conspiracy and causing disappearance of evidence. The high court acquitted Amin Ali and commuted the death sentence of Saiful Ali and Ansar Ali to imprisonment till the end of their natural life. The HC also directed the release from custody of another three convicts, whose sentence to life imprisonment was reduced to 7 years, and they already served 10 years, upon payment of a fine of Rs 10,000 each.

On 9 October 2023, at 4 am, the Bengal government filed a special leave petition in the Supreme Court against the HC judgement. In the SLP, the government alleged that there were glaring discrepancies in the impugned judgement and sought its suspension on the grounds that the accused would be released very soon. The Supreme Court didn't order a stay on the judgement but ordered all parties to submit affidavits within a week.

== Protests ==
From the early morning of 8 June 2013, the Kamduni residents protested afor exemplary punishment for the culprits. Jyotipriya Mallick, the Minister for Food and Supplies met the villagers and promised job for the victim's elder brother, which was promptly rejected by the villagers. The protesters were also visited by Haji Nurul Islam, the M.P. from Bashirhat and Nirmal Ghosh, the President of North 24 Parganas District Trinamool Congress. When the former blamed the CPI(M) for this crime, his car was damaged by the protesters. Protests continued until July 4, demanding capital punishment for the perpetrators.

Several human rights groups participated in the protests as well, submitting memoranda to the police and demanding access to political decisionmakers. The lawyers of Barasat Bar took out a procession in protest against the crime. The body declared that no lawyer in Barasat would stand for the accused. In the evening hundreds of residents brought out a candlelight procession in Baguiati, Kolkata. On 18 June, around 400 government employees of the Writers' Building marched around the Writers' Building in protest against the Kamduni gang rape and murder. Eminent intellectuals including, filmmaker Aparna Sen, Shankha Ghosh, Nabaneeta Dev Sen, Mrinal Sen, Mahashweta Devi and Tarun Majumder also showed their support for the victim and demanded justice.

== See also ==
- 1990 Bantala rape case
- 2012 Delhi gang rape case
