= Nabarun Bhattacharya =

Indian writer and poet (1948–2014)

- Born: 23 June 1948; Berhampore, West Bengal, India
- Died: 31 July 2014 (aged 66); Kolkata, West Bengal, India
- Education: Calcutta University
- Occupation: Writer
- Spouse: Pranati Bhattacharya
- Parents: Bijon Bhattacharya; Mahashweta Devi
- Relatives: Manish Ghatak (maternal grandfather); Ritwik Ghatak (great uncle); Sabyasachi Chakraborty
- Writing career
- Language: Bengali
- Notable works: Herbert (1994); Andho Biral; Fyataru
- Notable awards: Sahitya Akademi Award (1993)

Nabarun Bhattacharya (23 June 1948 – 31 July 2014) was an Indian writer who wrote in the Bengali language. He was born at Berhampore, West Bengal. He was the only child of actor and playwright Bijon Bhattacharya and writer and activist Mahashweta Devi. His maternal grandfather was a writer from the Kallol era Manish Ghatak. Visionary filmmaker Ritwik Ghatak was his great-uncle.

His novel, Herbert (1993), was awarded the Sahitya Akademi Award and adapted into a film of the same name by Suman Mukhopadhyay in 2005. Bhattacharya regularly edited a literary magazine Bhashabandhan. He was secretary of Ganasanskriti Parisad, the cultural organization of CPIML Liberation.

== Personal life ==
Bhattacharya studied in Kolkata, first Geology, then English, from Calcutta University. Nabarun married Pranati Bhattacharya, who was a professor of political science. Their son is the journalist Tathagata Bhattacharya.

== Works ==
=== The characters called Fyataru ===
His magic realist writings introduced a strange set of human beings to Bengali readers, called Fyataru (fyat: the sound created by kites while they are flown; otherwise, fyat has also a hint of someone worthless, deriving from the words foto, faaltu; uru: related to flying), who are an anarchic underclass fond of sabotage who are also capable of flying whenever they utter the mantra 'fyat fyat sh(n)aai sh(n)aai' (this mantra was later made into a song by the popular bangla band Chandrabindoo in one of its albums). They appear in his books Mausoleum, Kaangaal Maalshaat, Fatarur Bombachaak, Fyatarur Kumbhipaak and Mobloge Novel. Suman Mukhopadhyay, who was basically from a theatrical background, dramatized Kaangaal Maalshaat in a movie of the same name.

In 2019, a new English translation of Harbart was published by New Directions, reviewed for Words Without Borders by Arka Chattopadhyay. In 2020, Sourit Bhattacharya, Arka Chattopadhyay and Samrat Sengupta co-edited a Bloomsbury volume of Nabarun's short stories, poems, interviews and a set of critical articles on his works: Nabarun Bhattacharya: Aesthetics and Politics in a World after Ethics.

== Major works ==
- Kangal Malshat (কাঙাল মালসাট) (Hooghly: Saptarshi Prakashan, 2003)
- Herbert (হারবার্ট) (Kolkata: Deys, 1994)
- Lubdhak (লুব্ধক) (Barasat: Abhijan Publishers, 2006)
- Ei Mrityu Upotyoka Aamaar Desh Na (এই মৃত্যু উপত্যকা আমার দেশ না) (Hooghly: Saptarshi, 2004)
- Halaljhanda o Onyanyo (Hooghly: Saptarshi, 2009)
- Mahajaaner Aayna (Kolkata: Bhashabandhan, 2010)
- Fyaturur Kumbhipak (Kolkata: Bhashabandhan)
- Raater Circus (রাতের সার্কাস) (Kolkata: Bhashabandhan)
- Anarir Naarigyan (Kolkata: Bhashabandhan)
- Joratali (জোড়াতালি) (Kolkata: Bhashabandhan, Posthumous)
- Mablage Novel(Kolkata:Bhashabandhan, Posthumous)
- Andho Biral (অন্ধ বিড়াল)

== Death ==
Nabarun Bhattacharya died of intestinal cancer at Thakurpukur cancer hospital, Kolkata on 31 July 2014.
