= Sujan Mukherjee (actor) =

Indian actor

- Other name: Neel Mukherjee
- Occupations: Actor, Director
- Spouse: Nibedita Mukherjee (m. 1998)
- Father: Arun Mukherjee
- Relatives: Suman Mukhopadhyay (brother)

Sujan Mukherjee (also known as Neel Mukherjee) is an Indian actor who works in Bengali language films, television, and theatre. In 2012, he made his directorial debut with the film Ghete Gho. He is an active Member of the renowned theatre Group Chetana. On 22 February 2016, his directorial debut in theatre, Ghashiram Kotwalan—adaptation on Marathi play, was premiered. In 2018, he directed Don: Taake Bhalo Laage, an adaptation of Dale Wasserman's Don Quixote, which was translated into Bengali by his father, Arun Mukhopadhyay many years back. This play marked the re-entry of his brother and noted director Suman Mukhopadhyay, as an actor after 25 years.

== Filmography ==
=== As Film director ===
- Ghete Gho (unreleased)
- Chocolate (2016)

=== As Film actor ===
- Ekti Nadir Naam (2003)
- Nagardola (2005)
- Teen Yaari Katha (2005)
- Herbert (2006)
- Agnibalaka (2006)
- Chalo Let's Go (2008)
- Target (2010)
- Tokhon Teish (2011)
- Bye Bye Bangkok (2011)
- Chaplin (2011)
- Abar Byomkesh (2012)
- A Political Murder (2013)
- Mishar Rahasya (2013)
- Obhishopto Nighty (2014)
- Amoler Cabin (2016)
- Byomkesh O Chiriyakhana (2016)
- Zulfiqar (2016)
- Kiriti Roy (2016)
- Haami (2018)
- Uma (2018)
- Tonic (2021)
- Kuler Achaar (2022)
- Baro Babu (2022) - unreleased
- Shibpur (2023)
- Jete Nahi Dibo (2023)
- Pradhan (2023)
- Padatik (2024)
- Bohurupi (2024)
- Tekka (2024)
- Khadaan (2024)
- Bhaggyolokkhi (2025)
- Rappa Roy & Full Stop Dot Com (2025) under production
- Lawho Gouranger Naam Re (2025)
- Boro Babu ( 2027 )

=== As a playback singer ===
- Chaturanga (2008)

== Theatre ==
=== As theatre director ===
- Don Taake Bhalo Laage
- Rani Creusa
- Ghashiram Kotwal
- Mahatma Banam Gandhi
- Hibijibi Bahini
- Meghe Dhaka Ghatak

=== As a Theatre actor ===
- Don Taake Bhalo Laage as Sancho Panza
- Ghashiram Kotwal
- C/O Eklati
- Kaurubasana
- Brain
- Natoktar Nam Ki
- Jagannath
- Marich Sambad
- Mephisto
- Binodini Opera
- Hijibiji Bahini
- Meghe Dhaka Ghatak

== Television ==
- P I Meena
- Devi Chaudhurani
- Byomkesh (2014 TV series) as Nandadulal Babu
- Chokher Bali as Binodini's husband
- Sokhi as Manojit
- Ichche Nodee as Abir Banerjee aka Pagla Ghora
- Jol Nupur as Surya Panigrahi
- Lokkhi Chhana as Capt Neel as host of the children's show
- Jibon Saathi as Rick Sen
- Gangaram as Bablu Chatterjee
- Mon Phagun as Somraj
- Mou-Er-Bari as Mahitosh Sen
- Nabab Nandini as SRK
- Parashuram – Ajker Nayok as Karna Chatterjee
- Advocate Anjali Awasthi as Damodar Majumder
- Besh Korechi Prem Korechi

== Others ==
- Two Months (2017) (Hindi short film)

== See also ==
- Debesh Chattopadhyay
- Arpita Ghosh
- Suman Mukhopadhyay
- Kaushik Sen
- Bratya Basu
