= List of works by Manik Bandyopadhyay =

This is a list of Manik Bandyopadhyay's (19 May 1908 - 3 December 1956) works.

== Novels ==
- Janani (1935)
- Dibaratrir Kabya (1935)
- Putulnacher Itikatha (1936)
- Padma Nadir Majhi (1936)
- Jibaner Jotilata (1936)
- Amritasya Putrah (1938)
- Sahartali - Pratham Parva (1940)
- Ahimsa (1941)
- Sahartali - Dwitiya Parva (1941)
- Chatushkon (1942)
- Dhorabandha Jiban (1942)
- Pratibimba (1944)
- Darpan (1945)
- Sahar Baser Itikatha (1946)
- Chintamoni (1946)
- Chinho (1947)
- Aadaayer Itihaas (1947)
- Jiyanta (1950)
- Pesha (1951–52)
- Sonar Cheye Dami (Part I - Bekar) (1951)
- Swadhinatar Swad (1951)
- Chhandapatan (1951)
- Sonar Cheye Dami (Part II - Aaposh) (1952)
- Itikathar Porer Katha (1952)
- Pashapashi (1952)
- Sarbajanin (1952)
- Naagpaash (1953)
- Arogyo (1953)
- Chalchalan (1953)
- Teish Bochhor Age Pore (1953)
- Haraf (1954)
- Shubhashubho (1954)
- Paradhin Prem (1955)
- Holud Nodi Sabuj Bon (1956)
- Mashul (1956)
- Praneshwarer Upakhyan (1956, posthumous)
- Mati-Ghensha Manush (1957, posthumous)
- Majhir Chhele (1959, posthumous)
- Shantilata (1960, posthumous)

== Short-story collection ==
- Atasimami (1935)
- Atmahatmar adhikar
- Duhshashonio
- Haraner natjamai
- Shilpi
- Pragoitihasik (1937)
- Mihi o Mota Kahini (1938)
- Sarisrip (1939)
- Bou (1940)
- Samudrer Swad (1943)
- Bhejal (1944)
- Holud Pora (1945)
- Aj Kal Porshur Golpo (1946)
- Paristhiti (1946)
- Khatiyan (1947)
- Chhoto Boro (1948)
- Matir Mashul (1948)
- Chhotobokulpurer Jatri (1949)
- Feriwala (1953)
- Lajuklata (1953)
- Osohojogi (1948)

== Drama ==
- Bhitemati (1946)

== Prose collections ==
- Lekhaker Katha (Essays, 1957, posthumous)
- Aprakashito Manik Bandyopadhyay (journals and letters, 1976, posthumous)

== Poems ==
- Manik Bandyopadhyayer Kabita (1970, posthumous)

== Collections of works ==
- Manik Bandyopadhyayer Sheshtho Galpo (stories, 1950)
- Manik Granthabali: Pratham Bhag (selected works, 1950–51)
- Manik Granthabali: Dwitiyo Bhag (selected works, 1951–52)
- Manik Bandyopadhyayer Swanirbachito Galpo (stories, 1956)
- Manik Bandyopadhyay Kishor Rachana Sambhar (juvenile literature, 2006)
