= Radharani Devi =

- Born: 13 November 1903; Calcutta, Bengal Presidency, British India
- Died: 9 September 1989 (aged 85); Calcutta, West Bengal, India
- Occupations: Writer, poet
- Spouse(s): Satyendranath Dutta (first marriage); Narendra Deb (second marriage)
- Children: Nabaneeta Dev Sen
- Writing career
- Period: Twentieth Century

Radharani Devi (Bengali: রাধারাণী দেবী; 13 November 1903 – 9 September 1989) was one of the prominent Bengali women poets of the twentieth century.

== Literary career ==
Her first published work was the short story Bimata (Step-Mother) which was published in Basumati in 1924. Her first essay was Purush (The Male) which was published in Kallol. Her first book of collected poems, Lilakamal was published in 1929.

She wrote her second book Buker Beena under the penname of Aparajita Devi. After that she penned her third book of poem collections Bono Bohogi and the forth one, Bichitra Rupini both under her real name.

Devi was famous for her debate with Pramatha Chodhury in the Bengal writer's circuit Rabi Basar, where her enrolment as the first ever women member was initially opposed by Sarat Chandra Chattapadhyay but later was welcomed in the mediation of Jaladhar Sen. She was known to be fighting for women's rights in the Bengali literary arena during the twentieth century which was heavily dominated by males.

== Personal life ==
At the age of 13, she married Satendranath Dutta. However, Dutta died from Asiatic Flu the year of their marriage, leaving Devi a widow at a very early age. She started her literary career as a widow and later met the poet Narendra Deb, whom she married in 1931. Their first child, a son. died of pneumonia after just a few days of birth. Their second child was Nabaneeta Dev Sen, who later became an avid Bengali female poet and married Amartya Sen. Devi and Deb were very close to Rabindranath Tagore and Sarat Chandra Chattapadhyay. Devi's daughter's name Nabaneeta, was given by Tagore while Chattapadhyay gave her the name Anuradha. Chattapadhyay died after a few days of the birth of Dev Sen.

== Sources ==
- Sansad Bangali charitabhidhan. (1998). India: Sahitya Samsad. Second Part, Page 349–350.
- Radharani Devi: Life and Literature - Basanti Deb (Mazumdar), North Bengal University.
- History of Indian Literature: 1911–1956, struggle for freedom : triumph and tragedy
