= Putul Nacher Itikatha (1949 film) =

1949 film

Putul Nacher Itikatha is a Bengali drama film directed by Asit Bandopadhyay based on the Manik Bandyopadhyay's legendary novel Putul Nacher Itikatha. This film was the first celluloid adaptation of the novel, released under the banner of K K Production on 29 May 1949.

== Plot ==
The film revolves with the life of rural Bengal. Shashi, an atheist doctor lives in a village. His life based on the complex social relationships between his father, a housewife Kusum and other people of the village.

== Cast ==
- Goutam Mukhopadhyay
- Kali Banerjee
- Nilima Das
- Amiyo Bandopadhyay
- Amita Bose
