= Fyataru =

Fictitious character by Nabarun Bhattacharya

Fyataru is a fictional character of Bengali novelist and poet Nabarun Bhattacharya. Fyatarus are lower class flying human beings who like to make chaos in the so-called civil society. These characters are the part of creation of Bhattacharya's Magic realism.

== Origin ==
Nabarun Bhattacharya introduced Fyataru as a magical set of human beings to Bengali readers. It is believed that Fyataru was the most outstanding creations of his literary life. The Fyataru first appears in a short story published in Proma magazine in 1995. The word fyat means the sound created by kites while they are flow and uru relates with flying. Further in Bengali language 'fyat' also implies something worthless. Fyatarus belong to marginal section of society, who unsettle diabolical political structures and evil interests through pinpointed mayhem. They are anarchist, underclass in nature, fond of sabotage and are capable of flying whenever they utter the fyataru's anthem "fyat fyat sh(n)aai sh(n)aai". This anthem was made into a song by a Bangla band Chandrabindu in one of its albums. They appear in his books Mausoleum, Kaangaal Maalshaat, Fatarur Bombachaak, Fyatarur Kumbhipaak and Mobloge Novel. Fyatarus can easily use slangs and sub-altern language.

== Adaptations ==
Many Kolkata based theatre group adapted the stories of Fyataru and performed. Director Suman Mukhopadhyay picturised a fyataru based novel into a movie, Kangal Malsat in 2013.

In 2013, a graphic novel named Kangal Malsat, created by Madhuja Mukherjee based on the same name novel by Nabarun Bhattacharya. Both the film and the graphic novel released alongside.
