= Putulnacher Itikatha (film) =

Bengali drama film

- Theatrical release poster
- Directed by: Sumon Mukhopadhyay
- Screenplay by: Sumon Mukhopadhyay
- Based on: Putulnacher Itikatha by Manik Bandyopadhyay
- Produced by: Samiran Das
- Starring: Abir Chatterjee; Jaya Ahsan
- Cinematography: Sayak Bhattacharya
- Edited by: Tinni Mitra
- Music by: Prabuddha Banerjee
- Production company: Kaleidoscope Entertainment
- Distributed by: Kaleidoscope Entertainment
- Release date: 1 August 2025
- Running time: 136 minutes
- Country: India
- Language: Bengali

Putulnacher Itikatha (transl. The Puppet's Tale) is a 2025 Indian Bengali drama film directed by Sumon Mukhopadhyay. Produced under the banner of Kaleidoscope Entertainment, the film is based on the eponymous novel Putul Nacher Itikatha by Manik Bandopadhyay. Jaya Ahsan and Abir Chatterjee are in the lead roles while Parambrata Chatterjee and Dhritiman Chatterjee play other pivotal roles.

The music and background score of the film has been composed by Prabuddha Banerjee. Sayak Bhattacharya did the cinematography while the editing was handled by Tinni Mitra. The film was screened as an official selection under the competition section at the International Film Festival Rotterdam in 2025. The film was released in the theatres in India on 1 August 2025.

== Cast ==
- Parambrata Chatterjee as Kumud
- Abir Chatterjee as Shasi
- Jaya Ahsan as Kusum
- Dhritiman Chatterjee as Jadab
- Ananya Chatterjee as Sendidi
- Santilal Mukherjee as Gopal
- Surangana Banerjee as Moti

== Production ==
=== Development ===
Sumon Mukhopadhyay had written the script for the film many years back, in 2008, when he conceived the idea of making a film adaptation of Putul Nacher Itikatha by Manik Bandopadhyay. Due to budget issues and the difficulties in adapting the novel into an appropriate screenplay, he couldn't start the filming. The director mentioned in an interview that all throughout these years, he had recced multiple locations and videographed the ones he felt suitable for filming Putulnacher Itikatha. Jaya Ahsan's first look as Kusum was revealed in February 2022.

=== Announcement and filming ===
The film was announced in January 2022. The filming was started on 13 February 2022. The filming was scheduled to be completed within a short schedule of 25 days. But the filming stopped due to certain circumstances after 50% of the shooting was completed. The remaining filming was completed in January 2023.

Ananya Chatterjee shared her experience regarding the filming, when she used to spend fourteen hours day with only one eye opened. Her character in the film had suffered from smallpox and had a lost an eye owing to its side effects. So, she had to use prosthetics to make her one eye look damaged, which led her to suffer from immense headache and teary eyes syndrome for multiple days. She added that all day throughout the sets, she had to walk with the help of a someone or any support, since it was difficult for her to have a clear vision through a single eye.

== Marketing ==
The trailer of the film was released on 19 December 2024. For the theatrical release marketing, two trailers of the film were released in July 2025. The first one was released on 16 July 2025 and the second one on 27 July 2025. The special screening Putulnacher Itikatha was held at the PVR INOX at South City Mall in Kolkata on 1 August 2025.

== Reception ==
=== Critical reception ===
Devarsi Ghosh of Frontline reviewed the film and opined "Mukhopadhyay’s film is a downbeat and near-dystopic take on the psychologically complex story of a man of science clashing against a den of superstitions and conservatism." Tatsam Mukherjee of The Wire reviewed the film and applauded the performances of Abir Chatterjee and Jaya Ahsan, the line between cynicism and dogmatism and the luminous cinematography by Satyam Bhattacharya.

Debarati Gupta of Outlook reviewed the film and wrote "Ideated by Suman Mukhopadhyay, the film stirs thoughts that wander beyond Manik Bandyopadhyay’s original story, yet stay faithful to its essence." She praised the slow simmering cinematography that captures the natural elements in a rustic background, multiple memorable frames, the editing, acting mettle of every actor of the cast, the poetic tune maintained throughout the film and the poignant metaphorical end.

Poorna Banerjee of The Times of India rated the film 3.5/5 stars and wrote "Putulnacher Itikotha is a poignant reminder of how people become puppets—trapped by fate, tradition, and their own unrealised desires." She termed the film as a "visually lyrical portrayal of a village caught in the grip of superstition and inertia, as the world quietly moves past it." She applauded the rustic cinematography, the crisp editing, the haunting background score, the melancholic pace, the poetic precision used by the director and the performances of the whole cast, particularly Abir's "layered" performance and Jaya, Parambrata and Surangana in their respective roles.

Arani Bhattachrya of Sangbad Pratidin reviewed the film and highlighted "The director has aptly woven a simple narrative with half a dozen characters, interconnected in the rustic background of a rural village." She praised the display of the mother nature, the performances of all the actors, their interactions and the background score. Agnivo Niyogi of The Telegraph reviewed the film and wrote "the film takes a measured approach to explore the perennial conundrum surrounding traditionalism vs modernity" He praised the balance between Jadab Pandit's traditional view and Shashi's Western education, Ananya's restrained performance, Jaya's apt portrayal of the complex character of Kusum, the calm pace of the narrative, the breathing cinematography, editing and the music.

Subhash K Jha rated the film 3.5/5 stars and penned "The film adaptation is soaked in socio-historical ramifications, though never at the cost of a fluid storytelling." He praised the director for his display of female sexuality taboo in colonial era, the uncluttered narrative, the lush cinematography, the performances of the cast but mentioned that the subplot about the Sun scientist remained the "most unfilmable part of the original novel." Shoma A. Chatterji of Mathrubhumi reviewed the film and wrote "Suman Mukhopadhyay`s film adaptation of Manik Bandopadhyay`s Putul Nacher Itikatha explores destiny, hypocrisy, and social reform in rural Bengal." She applauded the cinematography, music, editing and the performance of the actors and the direction.

== Accolades ==
- Official Selection - 2025 International Film Festival Rotterdam (Competition Section)
- Won the Award for Humanism in Cinema Arts at Kazan International Film Festival, 2025
- German Premiere at Filmkunstfest Mecklenburg-Vorpommern, 2025
