= Chetana (theatre group) =

Indian theatre group

- Formation: November 22, 1972
- Type: Theatre group
- Location: Kolkata, West Bengal, India
- Artistic director(s): Arun Mukherjee, Suman Mukhopadhyay, Sujan Mukhopadhyay

Chetana (Bengali: চেতনা) is an Indian theatre group based on Kolkata, West Bengal. It was founded on November 22, 1972 by Arun Mukherjee.

== History ==
On November 22, 1972, Arun Mukherjee, along with his colleagues, formed Chetana. It has produced approximately 30 full length plays and 15 short plays. Its major productions include: Mareech Sambad, Jagannath, Tista Parer brittanta, Mephisto.

Chetana has performed in Europe, North America, Bangladesh, and many major cities in India. On its European tours in 2004, it participated in the Ibsen Stage Festival in Oslo; it has also performed in London.

== Plays ==
List Of Plays Produced by Chetana
Year of Production	Plays	Director	Actor(s)/Actress(es)
2025	MEGHE DHAKA GHATAK (written by Jeet Satragni ) To celebrate the centenary of the filmmaker-philosopher Ritwik Kumar Ghatak	Sujan Mukhopadhyay	Sujan Mukhopadhyay (RITWIK GHATAK) Nibedita Mukhopadhyay (SUROMA GHATAK) and Others
2024	HIJIBIJI BAHINI (written by Sujan Mukhopadhyay )	Sujan Mukhopadhyay	Sujan Mukhopadhyay Nibedita Mukhopadhyay and young talents of CHETANA
2023	MAHATMA BONAAM GANDHI (written by Ajit Dalvi . translated by Arun Mukhopadhyay )	Sujan Mukhopadhyay	Sujan Mukhopadhyay(Harilal Gandhi) Nibedita Mukhopadhyay (Kasurba)Anirban Chakrabarti (Gandhiji) and Others
2022	GOPAL URE and Co. (written by Ujjwal Chattopadhyay)	Sujan Mukhopadhyay	Sujan Mukhopadhyay Nibedita Mukhopadhyay and Others
2020	Kusum Kusum		
2020	Girgiti		
2019	RANI CREUSA(written by Bratya Basu)	Sujan Mukhopadhyay	Nibedita Mukhopadhyay, Saheb Chatterjee
2018	Don — Taake Bhalo Laage modified version of Dukhi Mukhi Joddha	Sujan Mukhopadhyay	Suman Mukhopadhyay(Don),Nibedita Mukhopadhyay (Dulcinea)
2017	Magan rajar pala		
2016	Ghashiram Kotwal		
2012	Marich Sambad (Revived)		
2012	Jagannath (Revived)		
2012	Ela Ebong Bimala		
2011	Apni Kondike (Revived)		
2010	Mrityu Sambad		
2009	Chirakumar sabha		
2009	Manush kimba Kolbalish		
2007	Putul Nacher Itikotha		
2005	Apni Kondike		
2004	Chalachitto Chanchari (Revived)		
2005	Kangal Malsat		
2004	Ganashatru		
2004	Falguni, Suchana Parba		
2003	Nirnoye		
2003	Samay Asamayer Britanto		
2002	Jagannath (Revived)		
2002	Wrong Number		
2002	KhotaKhot		
2002	Mephisto		
2002	Kalantak Lal Fita		
2000	Chalachitto Chanchari		
2000	Tista Parer Brittanto		
2000	Jaysa ka Taysa		
1999	Maa		
1998	Haraner Natjamai		
1997	Gantobyo		
1977	Ulki		
1996	Bagh		
1996	Jagannath (Hindi)		
1995	Vul Rasta		
1994	Dukhi Mukhi Joddha		
1993	End Game		
1992	Notir Kotha		
1992	Coriolanus		
1990	Horipodo Horibol		
1990	Daain		
1989	Kabeer (based on Kabira Khada Bazaar Mein)		
1988	Jeshtho Putra		
1986	Valo Manusher Pala (Revived)		
1985	Roshan		
1984	Vuter Bore		
1982	Maa		
1982	Tomader Juddho Tomra Koro		
1982	Kshetu Bagdi O Gopal Kahar		
1980	Somadhan		
1977	Oppenheimer		
1977	Ulki		
1977	Jagannath		
1975	Ramjatra		
1974	Spartacus		
1974	Valo Manusher Pala		
1973	Marich Sambad		
