= Manish Ghatak =

Indian poet and writer

- Born: 9 February 1902; Berhampore, Bengal Presidency, British India
- Died: 27 December 1979 (aged 77); Berhampore, West Bengal, India
- Other name: Jubanashwa
- Known for: Writer
- Spouse: Dharitri Devi
- Children: Mahasweta Devi

Manish Ghatak (9 February 1902– 27 December 1979) was an Indian poet and novelist writing in Bengali.

== Personal life ==
Manish Ghatak's parents were Suresh Chandra Ghatak and Indubala Devi. Noted Bengali film director Ritwik Ghatak was his youngest brother. Ghatak married Dharitri Devi, who was from the well known Chaudhuri family in Dhaka, in undivided Bengal, with Sankho Chaudhuri, the noted sculptor and Sachin Chaudhuri, the founder-editor of the Economic and Political Weekly of India, being her siblings. Mahasweta Devi is their eldest daughter. His eldest grandson, Mahasweta Devi's son, Nabarun Bhattacharya was also a very well-known writer.

== Books ==
- Pataldangar Panchali (a book of short stories)
- Kankhal (novel)
- Shilalipi (book of poem)
- Jadio Sandhya (book of poem)
- Bidusi Bak(book of poem)
- Ekchakra(collection of poems)
- Mandhatar Babar Amol(Autobiography)
