= Social Network for Assistance to People =

West Bengali non-profit organization

- Nickname: Association SNAP
- Formation: April 2008
- Type: Not for profit
- Location: Durgapur, Kolkata
- Website: www.snapbengal.org

Social Network for Assistance to People (informally Association SNAP) is a non-profit, registered organization to provide required services to all minorities in West Bengal. It is a non-profitable, non-political, non-governmental organization to arrest division in society and to propagate harmony in the society. The organization became notable for the most comprehensive field-level survey on the socio-economic status of Muslims living in West Bengal which was released on 31 May 2014 by Bengali poet Sankha Ghosh and writer Nabanita Dev Sen.

== History ==
Association SNAP was formed in April 2008 under West Bengal Societies Registration act XXVI of 1961.

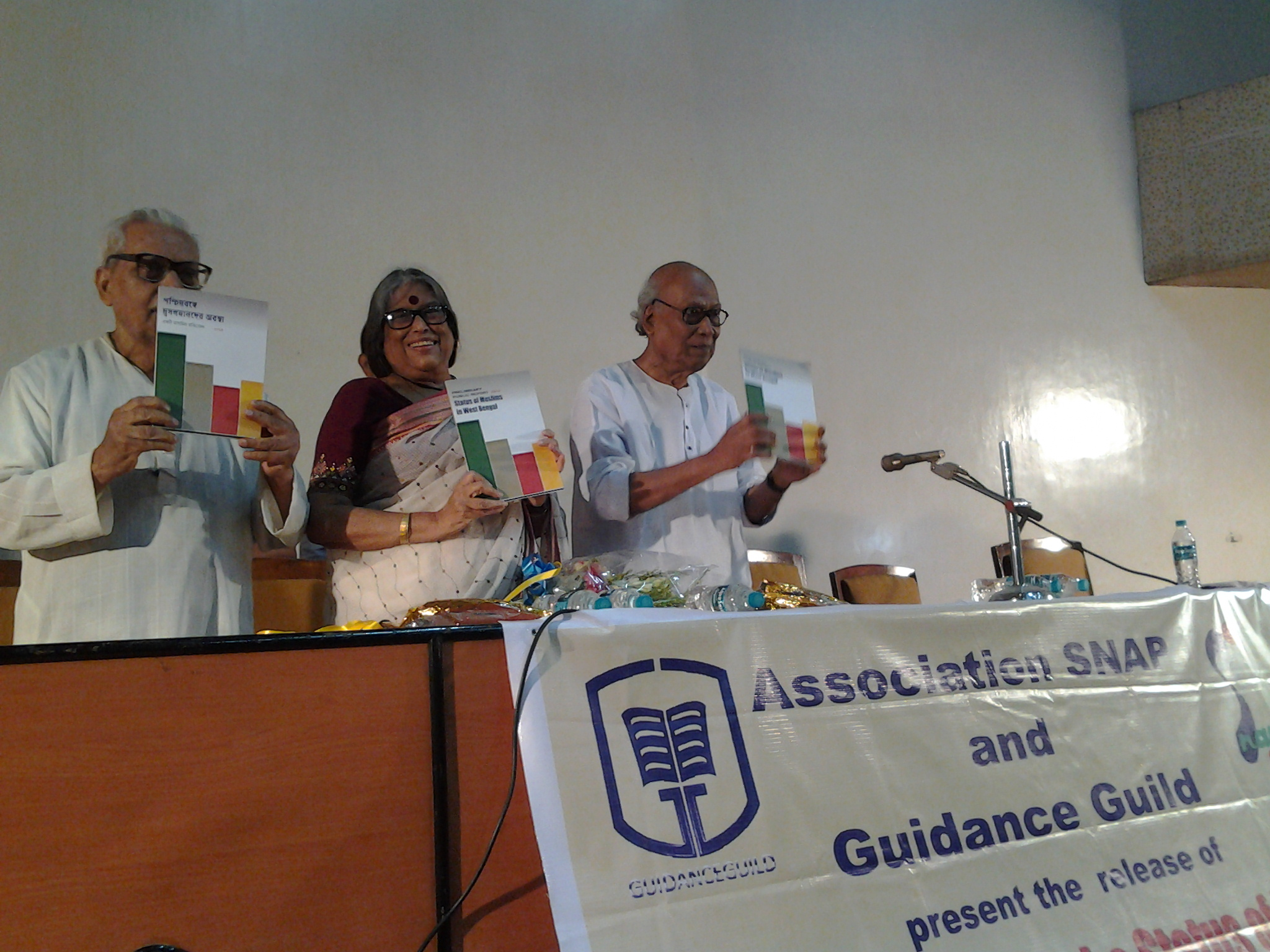
Poet Sankha Ghosh and litterateur Nabaneeta Dev Sen releasing the report.

== Objectives ==
The objectives of Association SNAP is to provide required services to all minorities in the state of West Bengal which includes providing information to minority community regarding different Central Govt. and State Govt. schemes and many other educational, training and job-oriented schemes. They are also planning to take more proactive steps to uplift the minority condition in the state in association with both Government and private agencies and larger section of people from minority society.

According to SNAP, they offer detail assistance with information including required details about the scholarships, education loans, available hostels, dormitories, boarding to the students desperately seeking to overcome the hurdles on their educational journey in West Bengal.

== Vision ==
To assist the minority community with economic and educational development, and support its members in contributing to national development.
