= Antara Dev Sen =

Indian journalist

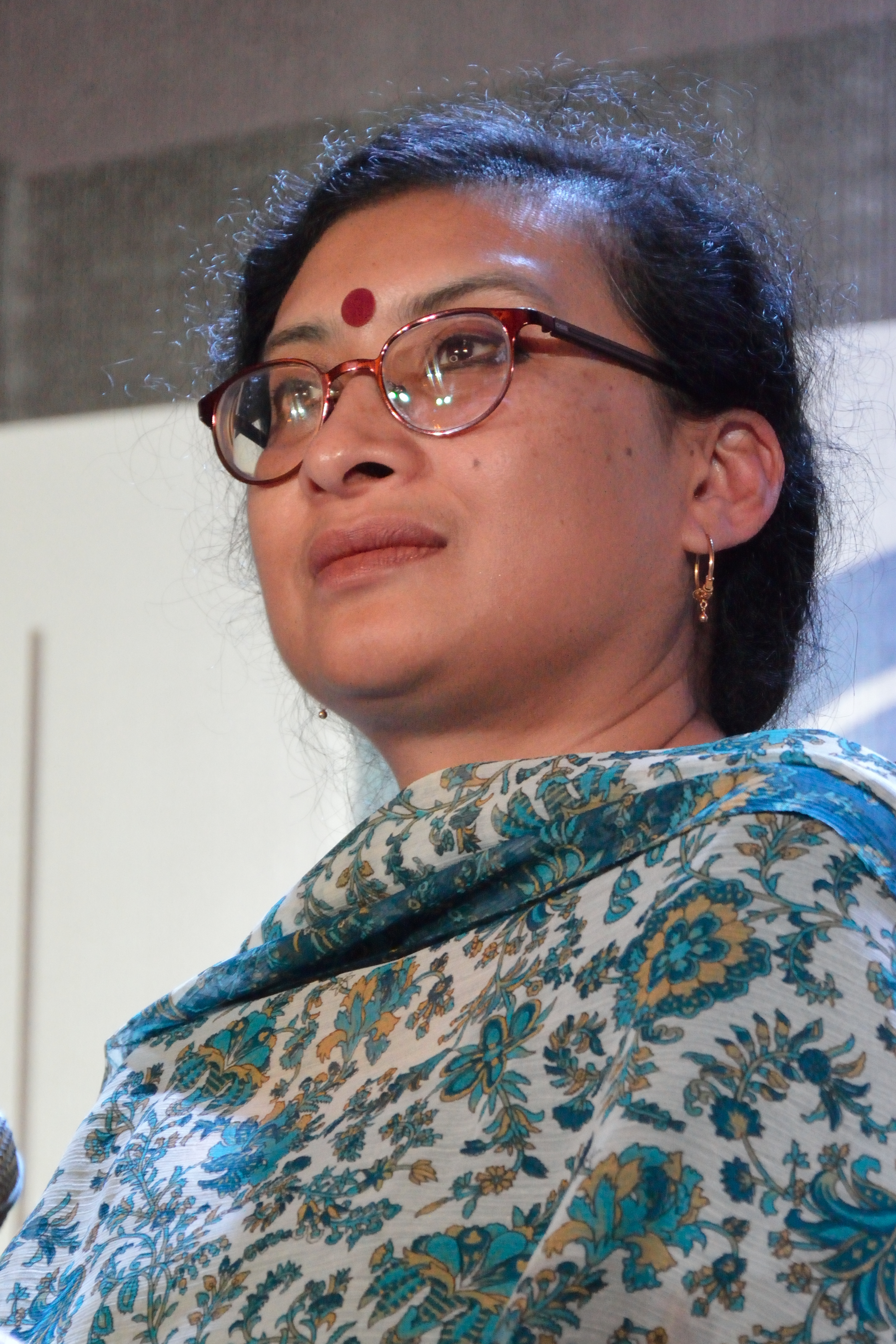
- Sen at the Kolkata Literary Meet 2013
- Born: 1963 (age 62–63)
- Occupations: Writer, journalist
- Spouse: Pratik Kanjilal
- Parent(s): Amartya Sen; Nabaneeta Dev Sen
- Family: Sen family

Antara Dev Sen (born 1963) is a British-born Indian journalist based in Delhi.

== Early life and education ==
Antara was born in Cambridge, England to Nobel Laureate and Bharat Ratna economist Amartya Sen and Padma Shri awardee Nabanita Dev Sen. Her younger sister Nandana Sen is an Indian-born American actress, screenwriter, children's author, and child-rights activist. After her parents separated, she and her sister moved to Kolkata with their mother Nabanita.

Antara did her schooling in Delhi and later in Kolkata and higher education in India (Kolkata) and United States. Sen studied at Jadavpur University, Calcutta, Smith College in Massachusetts, U.S. and at Harvard University.

== Career ==
She then joined the Hindustan Times. As a senior editor of the Hindustan Times, she went to Oxford University on a fellowship from the Reuters Foundation. She has also worked with the Ananda Bazaar Patrika Group in Calcutta and with The Indian Express in Delhi, where she was senior assistant editor.

On her return to Delhi, she started The Little Magazine and was its founding editor. The magazine predominantly publishes articles on literary themes relating to South Asia. She is also a literary critic and translator, a newspaper columnist and commentator on the media, society, politics, culture and development. She has edited several books including the TLM Short Stories from South Asia series.

Sen is also managing trustee of Pratichi, a trust working on education and health. Further, she is a Guest Editor at Indian Literature, Sahitya Akademi's bimonthly English journal.
