= Aranyer Adhikar =

1977 novel by Mahasweta Devi

- Author: Mahasweta Devi
- Original title: অরণ্যের অধিকার
- Language: Bengali
- Genre: Novel
- Published: 1977
- Publication place: India

Aranyer Adhikar (Rights over the Forest, first published 1977) is a Bengali novel written by Mahasweta Devi. For this novel Mahasweta Devi received Sahitya Akademi Award in 1979. The novel narrates the life and fight of Indian tribal freedom fighter Birsa Munda.
