= Hazaar Chaurasi Ki Maa =

- Hazaar Chaurasi Ki Maa DVD cover
- Directed by: Govind Nihalani
- Written by: Mahasweta Devi (novel); Govind Nihalani (screenplay); Tripurari Sharma (dialogues)
- Based on: Hajar Churashir Maa (novel)
- Produced by: Manmohan Shetty, Govind Nihalani
- Starring: Jaya Bachchan; Anupam Kher; Joy Sengupta; Nandita Das; Seema Biswas; Milind Gunaji; Aditya Srivastava
- Cinematography: Govind Nihalani
- Edited by: Deepa Bhatia
- Music by: Debajyoti Mishra
- Release date: 20 March 1998 (India)
- Running time: 152 min
- Country: India
- Language: Hindi

Hazaar Chaurasi Ki Maa (English: The Mother of 1084) is a 1998 Indian feature film that deals with the life of a woman who loses her son, a Naxalite, to the violence that is a result of his adopted ideology.

The film is directed produced by Govind Nihalani and is based on Magsaysay and Jnanpith award recipient Mahasweta Devi's Bengali 1974 novel Hajar Churashir Maa. The screenplay is written by Nihalani and the dialogues by Tripurari Sharma. The film stars Jaya Bachchan, Anupam Kher, Milind Gunaji, Seema Biswas, Joy Sengupta and Nandita Das. It marks Jaya Bachchan's return to acting after a gap of 18 years.

In 1998, Hazaar Chaurasi Ki Maa won the National Film Award for Best Feature Film in Hindi.

== Plot ==
Dibyanath Chatterji, his bank-employed wife, Sujata, and youngest son, Brati, live an affluent existence in Calcutta, West Bengal, India, circa early 1970s. Sujata is a quiet, devout Hindu, religious, and compassionate woman, and Brati has finished his school and is now attending college. His parents are proud of him, and keep track of his progress. Then their world is shattered during the early hours, when they are informed by the police that Brati has been killed. Dibyanath and Sujata go to identify Brati's body, mourn, lament inconsolably. They know now that their lives will never be the same again - for by the police they will be called the mother and father of corpse No. 1084. Sujata struggles to understand Brati's passing, meets his friends one by one, learns that Brati had a girlfriend, Nandini Mitra (played by Nandita Das), and that's when she finds out that Brati was part of a revolutionary communist group often referred to as "Naxalite". As she delves deeper and deeper into Brati's former life, she begins to understand her son's struggle, and decides to continue to further this.

== Cast ==
- Jaya Bachchan as Sujata Chatterjee
- Anupam Kher as Dibyanath Chatterjee
- Joy Sengupta as Brati Chatterjee
- Seema Biswas as Somu's mother
- Rajesh Tailang as Somu's Father
- Nandita Das as Nandini Mitra
- Milind Gunaji as Inspector Saroj Pal
- Mona Ambegaonkar as Bini
- Sandeep Kulkarni as Nitu Paul
- Yashpal Sharma as Laltu
