= Gokulchandra Nag =

Bengali writer and editor

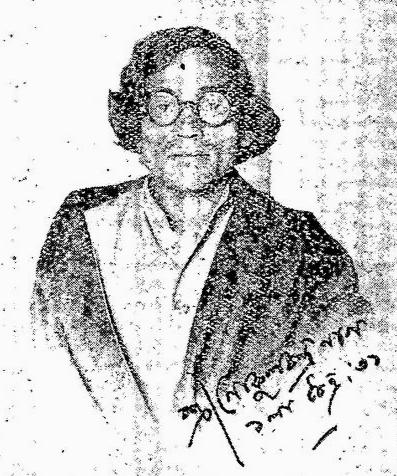
- Gokulchandra Nag
- Born: 28 June 1894; Shibpur, Howrah, Bengal Presidency, British Indian (now in Howrah district, West Bengal, India)
- Died: 24 September 1925 (aged 31); Darjeeling, West Bengal, India
- Occupations: Writer and editor
- Movement: Kallol
- Parent(s): Motilal Nag (Father), Kamala Devi (Mother)

Gokulchandra Nag (Bengali: গোকুলচন্দ্র নাগ; 28 June 1894 – 24 September 1925) was a Bengali writer and artist, best known as one of the founding members of the Kallol literary group and circle during early twentieth century Bengal' His elder brother Kalidas Nag was a distinguished historian and academic.

== Career ==
In 1921 along with Dineshranjan Das, Sunita Debi and Manindralal Basu he formed the predecessor of Kallol, "The Four Arts Club". He was adept at all of the four arts that the club propagated, namely, writing, painting, music, and drama. Along with his cultural practices he ran a florist's shop in New Market, Calcutta. He published stories in Jhorer Dola (The Sway of the Storm) published in 1922. The volume was an anthology of the stories of the four founding members of the club.

In 1923, Nag and Das founded the Kallol group. The literary discussions of the group would be held at Das' house at Patuatola Lane.
