= Kangal Malsat =

- Directed by: Suman Mukhopadhyay
- Based on: Kangal Malsat by Nabarun Bhattacharya
- Produced by: Pawan Kanodia
- Cinematography: Avik Mukhopadhyay
- Edited by: Arghyakamal Mitra
- Release date: 2 August 2013
- Country: India
- Language: Bengali

Kangal Malsat ("War Cry of the Have-Nots") is a 2013 Indian Bengali-language political satire film directed by Suman Mukhopadhyay and based on the novel of the same name written by Nabarun Bhattacharya. As of February 2013, the Central Board of Film Certification denied approval of the film, citing distortion of history, excessive use of abusive language, sexuality, and the portrayal of social movements in a harmful way. The film got clearance in the Film Certification Appellate Tribunal in the first week of March 2013. Finally the film was set to be released on 2 August 2013.

== Plot ==
In the Bengali language, the name of the film literally translates to "War cry of the Beggars". The film shows two imaginary groups of contemporary Bengal: The fyataru, flying human beings, and the Choktor, a black magic Bhodi sect. The head of the Choktors, initiates a total war against the ruling political party of West Bengal, India. Fyatarus join hands with Choktors. Advised by Calcutta's progenitors, the Dandabayash (ageless primordial talking crow) and an Indo-colonial half-breed Begum Johnson initiate a historic insurrection. Jointly, they launch guerrilla attacks against the Government. Skulls dance in crematoria and flying-discs flutter in the skies, crying anarchy. Resident ghosts gossip and prattle, and the police is in total confusion. Government is forced to surrender and offer a peace proposal to the joint force. This anarchic film dissects almost everything wrong in the city with a cinematic knife that was sharpened on trenchant farce and fantasy.

== Cast ==
- Kabir Suman as Dandabayosh (The crow)
- Kaushik Ganguly as Marshal Bhodi
- Shantilal Mukherjee as Madan
- Kamalika Banerjee as Bhodi's wife
- Ushasie Chakraborty as Kali
- Joyraj Bhattacharjee as Purandar Bhat
- Dibyendu Bhattacharya as D S
- Dwijen Bandopadhyay as Anadi Pramanik
- Disha Mishra as Mohini

== Controversies ==
In February 2013, the Central Board of Film Certification refused to pass the film. The letter of denial cited excessive use of abusive language, sexuality, frivolous approach in portraying of social movements and negative portrayal of the character Joseph Stalin.

Mukhopadhyay, the director of the film, was angry that the censor board blocked the film and he said in an interview: "It is frightening because it is interference of an artist's work and it is happening again and again in West Bengal. It is not the first time. There was the Ambikesh Mahapatra cartoon case, there was the segregation of newspapers and TV channels as friendly and not friendly, there was the student who was called a Maoist because she asked a question. All these small events are symptomatic of a mindset of what I will say are fascist tendencies."

In March 2013, the film was cleared by the tribunal and most objections raised by the Censor Board were rejected by the Film Certification Appellate Tribunal headed by chairman Lalit Bhasin. But, they did not allow to portray the full oath of Mamata Banerjee as West Bengal's Chief Minister, since they felt it was not a biopic of Banerjee and the filmmakers were asked to cut the 76 swear words by fifty percent.

A particular scene of the movie involving Disha Mishra was controversial due to nudity and graphic depiction of Sex.

== See also ==
- Herbert (film)
- Fyataru
