= Hajar Churashir Maa =

1974 Bengali novel

- Hajar Churashir Maa front cover
- Author: Mahasweta Devi
- Cover artist: Khaled Chaudhury
- Language: Bengali
- Publisher: Karuna Prakashani, Kolkata
- Publication date: 1974
- Media type: Print (Hardcover)
- ISBN: 978-81-8437-055-3

Hajar Churashir Maa (No. 1084's Mother) is a 1974 Bengali novel written by Ramon Magsaysay Award winner Mahasweta Devi. It was written in 1974 on the backdrop of the Naxalite revolution in the Seventies.

== Overview ==
Hajar Churashir Maa (means Mother of 1084) is story of a mother (Sujata) whose son (Brati), corpse number 1084 in the morgue, was brutally killed by the state because of his ideology of advocating of class war against the Indian and struggle against its collaborators. The story starts on the eve of Brati's death anniversary when Sujata recollects her son starting from his birth. She meets Brati's close accomplice and tries to justify Brati's actions and his revolutionary mentalities. Throughout the story she is portrayed as a strong woman who fought against the odds. She is advised to forget her son, as people like her son are what are often called "cancerous growth on the body of democracy". It's a story of a mother as she relives, years later, the death of her son in the political upheaval that left almost no home untouched. Hajar Churashir Maa also portrays the other faces of the human stories that emanated from the restless political adventure of the vibrant Bengali youth, which was ruthlessly cowed by the then Congress government until the CPI(M) displaced them and who then again themselves ruthlessly cowed their opponents, the same Bengali youth.

== Characters ==
- Sujata: Main protagonist and a modern strong mother.
- Brati: Rebel and son of Sujata.
- Dibyanath: Husband of Sujata and seen as same type of people against whom Brati fought.
- Nandini : girlfriend of Brati

== Film adaptation ==
Govind Nihalani made this novel to a film called Hazaar Chaurasi Ki Maa in 1998.Hazaar Chaurasi Ki Maa won the National Film Award for Best Feature Film in Hindi.

== Award ==
Mahasweta Devi got the Jnanpith Award in 1996 for this book, which she received from South African freedom fighter and president Nelson Mandela.

- ISBN 8184370555 (Karuna Prakashani, Kolkata-9)
- ISBN 978-81-8437-055-3 (Karuna Prakashani, Kolkata-9)
