= Bisarjan =

2012 Bengali drama

Bisarjan is a 2012 Bengali drama directed by Suman Mukhopadhyay. The play is based on Rabindranath Tagore's Bisarjan (1890).

== Plot ==
Tagore's work was on how humans lost out their paradise trying to satisfy a god who wanted for animal sacrifice. Mukhopadhyay, in this play, has interpreted the theme of sacrifice at various levels. It is a story based around goddess Kali and how the King believes she does not want animal sacrifice. The priest, on the other hand, believes he is considering the goddess a subject of his court that he can control.

== Cast ==
- Goutam Halder as Raghupati
- Kaushik Sen as Jaisingh– Raghupati's foster son and disciple
- Biplab Bandopadhyay as King Gobindamanikya
- Turna Das as Aparna
- Mishka Halim as Rani Gunabati
