= Rana Nayar =

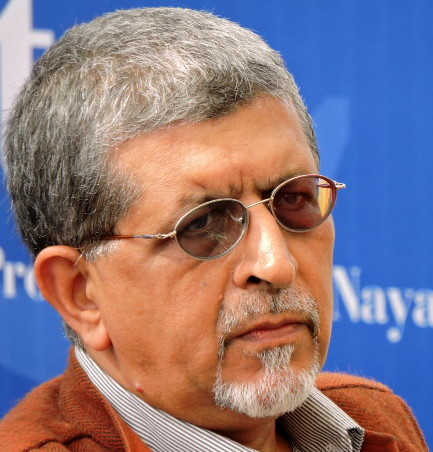
- Nayar in 2016.
- Born: 1957 (age 68–69)
- Occupation: Translator

Rana Nayar (born 1957) is a translator of poetry and short fiction from Punjabi to English. He has more than forty volumes of poetry and translation works to his credit. He is also a theatre artist and has participated in a number of major full-length productions. He won Sahitya Akademi Golden Jubilee prize for his English translation of the Punjabi devotional poetry of Saint Baba Farid.

== Education and career ==
Nayar taught English literature at St Bede's College in Shimla from 1980 to 1990. In 1990 he joined Panjab University, Chandigarh, where he became Professor and Head of the Department of English and Cultural Studies. He has also served as visiting professor with Peter Wall Institute for Advanced Studies.

== Major works ==
A critic, scholar and translator, Rana Nayar has been a pioneer in bringing into Punjabi translation a great number of classics from Punjabi literature. Among the prominent Punjabi authors he has translated are included such literary giants as Gurdial Singh, Raghubir Dhand, Mohan Bhandari and Beeba Balwant inter alia. He has translated three of Gurdial's novels, Night of the Half-moon, Parsa and Alms in the Name of a Blind Horse. He has also translated 14 short stories by Gurdial under the title Earthy Tones.

Besides translating the works of such prominent women writers from Punjab such as Amrita Pritam, Ajit Caur and Dalip Kaur Tiwana, he has helped in bringing to public notice such lesser known writers as Chandan Negi, who writes in both Punjabi and Dogri. Rana Nayar was instrumental in revival of interest in Gurdial Singh's novels and short stories.

His first collection of poems (composed by himself) is titled Breathing Spaces, which has received critical review and appreciation in Indian literary circle.

== Critical and analytical writing ==
Rana Nayar's critical works on poetry include "Edward Albee: Towards a Typology of Relationships" published in 2003 by Prestige Publishers. His other critical works which are forthcoming include "Mediations: Self & Society", which is a collection of essays on Indian history, society and culture, and "Third World Narrative : Theory & Practice". He has made seminal contribution to historical analysis of Indian literary translation.

== Awards and recognition ==
Rana Nayar has been a Charles Wallace (India) Trust Awardee, besides having won commendation awards for translation from British Council and Katha. In 2007 he won Sahitya Akademi's Indian Literature Golden Jubilee Literary Translation Prize for Poetry. Rana Nayar is also on the editorial board of the prestigious Lakeview International Journal of Literature & Arts.

== Bibliography ==
- Night of the Half Moon, (1996), Macmillan Publishers
- Parsa (2000), National Book Trust
- From Across the Shores: Punjabi Short Stories by Asians in Britain (2002), Sterling Publishers, ISBN 978-81-207241-4-3
- Earthly Tones (2002), Fiction House
- The Eye of a Doe and Other Stories (2003), Sahitya Akademi
- Melting Moments (2004), Unistar
- Tale of a Cursed Tree (2004), Ravi Sahitya Prakashan
- The Survivors (2005), Katha
- Slice of Life (2005), Unistar
- Shivoham (2007), Rupa Publications, ISBN 978-81-207241-4-3
- Gurdial Singh - A Reader (2012), Sahitya Akademi, ISBN 978-81-260339-7-3
- Alms in the Name of a Blind Horse (2016), Rupa Publications, ISBN 978-81-291373-1-9

== See also ==
- Sahitya Akademi Golden Jubilee Award
- Indian poetry
- Indian Literature
