= Nabaneeta Dev Sen =

Indian writer and academic (1938–2019)

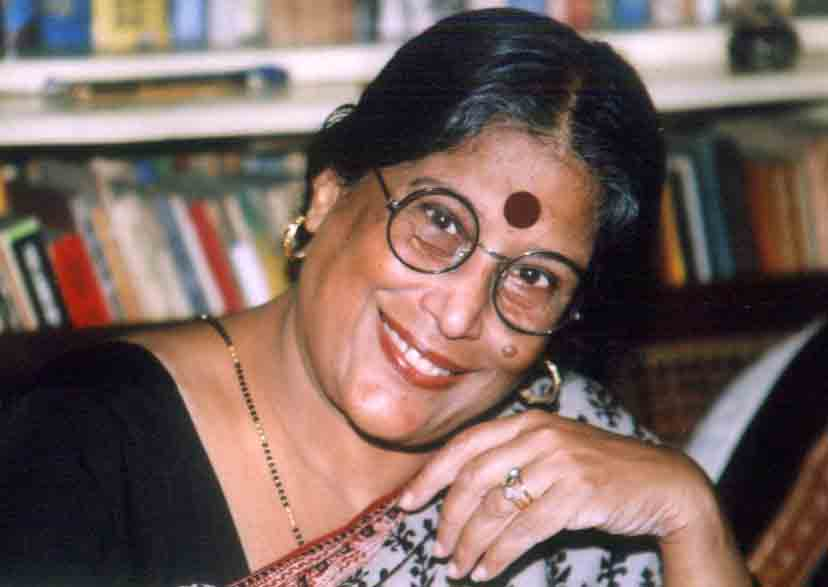
- Born: 13 January 1938; Calcutta, British India
- Died: 7 November 2019 (aged 81); Kolkata, India
- Education: Presidency College, Kolkata (BA); Jadavpur University (MA); Harvard University (MA); Indiana University Bloomington (PhD)
- Occupations: Novelist, children's author, poet, academic
- Spouse: Amartya Sen (m. 1958; div. 1976)
- Children: Antara and Nandana
- Writing career
- Notable awards: Padma Shri (2000); Sahitya Akademi Award (1999); Kamal Kumari National Award (2004)

Nabaneeta Dev Sen (Nôbonita Deb Sen; 13 January 1938 – 7 November 2019) was an Indian writer and academic. After studying arts and comparative literature, she moved to the United States where she studied further. She returned to India and taught at several universities and institutes as well as serving in various positions in literary institutes. She published more than 80 books in Bengali: poetry, novels, short stories, plays, literary criticism, personal essays, travelogues, humour writing, translations and children's literature. She was awarded the Padma Shri in 2000 and the Sahitya Akademi Award in 1999.

== Early life and education ==
Dev Sen was born in Calcutta (now Kolkata) into a Bengali family on 13 January 1938. She was the only child of the poet-couple Narendra Dev (Narendra Deb 1888–1971, son of Nagendra Chandra Deb) and Radharani Devi (1903–1989), who wrote under the pen name Aparajita Devi. She was given her name by Rabindranath Tagore.

Her childhood experiences included World War II air raids, seeing people starving in the Bengal famine of 1943, and the impact of large numbers of refugees arriving in Calcutta after the partition of India. She attended Gokhale Memorial Girls' School and Presidency College, Kolkata.

She received her BA in English from Presidency College, Kolkata, and was a student of inaugural batch of the Department of Comparative Literature at Jadavpur University, from where she obtained her MA in 1958. She obtained another MA (with distinction) in comparative literature from Harvard University in 1961 and went on to receive a doctorate from Indiana University Bloomington in 1964. She then completed her post-doctoral research at the University of California at Berkeley and Newnham College, Cambridge.

== Career ==
=== Academic ===
Dev Sen was a writer in residence at several international artists' colonies, including Yaddo and MacDowell Colony in the United States; Bellaggio in Italy; and the Mishkenot Sha'ananim in Jerusalem.

She held the Maytag Chair of Creative Writing and Comparative Literature at Colorado College, 1988–1989. She was a visiting professor and a visiting creative writer at several universities including Harvard, Cornell, Columbia, Chicago (USA), Humboldt (Germany), Universities of Toronto, British Columbia (Canada), Melbourne, New South Wales (Australia), and El Collegio de Mexico. She delivered the Radhakrishnan Memorial Lecture series (1996–1997) at Oxford University on epic poetry.

In 2002, Dev Sen retired as Professor of Comparative Literature at Jadavpur University, Calcutta.

She was a University Grants Commission Senior Fellow at University of Delhi. From 2003 to 2005, Dev Sen was the J. P. Naik Distinguished Fellow at the Centre of Women's Development Studies in New Delhi.

She represented herself and India in many international conferences, both academic and literary, and at the Festival of India USA in 1986.

Dev Sen was a member of the Social Network for Assistance to People (informally Association SNAP) that published a ground-breaking survey in 2014 that revealed the extent of poverty among the Muslim community of West Bengal.

=== Associations ===
She held executive positions in the International Comparative Literature Association (1973–1979), and the International Association of Semiotic and Structural Studies (1989–1994). Dev Sen was the vice-president of the Bangiya Sahitya Parishad, an academy for Bengali literature. She was the founder and president of West Bengal Women Writers' Association. She was the founder secretary and later vice-president of the Indian National Comparative Literature Association. She was a Fellow of the Royal Asiatic Society of Great Britain. She was a member of the advisory board for Bengali, Sahitya Akademi from 1978 to 1982, as well as the Member and Convenor, Bharatiya Jnanpith Award Language Advisory Committee from 1975 to 1990.

She also served as Member of the Jury of important literary awards including the Jnanpith Award, Saraswati Samman, Kabir Samman, and Rabindra Puraskar.

=== Literary career ===
Dev Sen published more than 80 books in Bengali: poetry, novels, short stories, plays, literary criticism, personal essays, travelogues, humour writing, translations and children's literature. She worked with the treatment of women in world epics; she wrote several short stories presenting Sita in a different way from how she appears in the Ramayana.

Her first collection of poems Pratham Pratyay (First Confidence) was published in 1959. Her second poetry collection Swagato Debdoot was published 12 years later.

Her first novel Ami Anupam (I, Anupam) was published in 1976 in the Puja Issue of the Ananda Bazar Patrika. It is about urban middle class intellectuals who lead the youth in revolution and later contradict them during the Naxalite movement.

Dev Sen dealt with a wide variety of social, political, psychological problems like the role of the intellectuals in the Naxalite movement (Ami Anupam, 1976), the identity crisis of Indian writing in English (1977), that of second generation non-resident Indians (1985), breakdown of the joint family, life in old age homes (1988), homosexuality (1995), facing AIDS (1999, 2002), child abuse, obsession, and uprootedness.

Her first short story collection was Monsieur Hulor Holiday (Monsieur Hulo's Holiday, 1980). Her essays, such as Nati Nabanita (Nabaneeta the Actress, 1983), are considered the best of her prose writing by critic Sanjukta Gupta.

Her best-selling Karuna Tomar Kon Path Diye (The Path of Thy Grace, 1978) has an account of a solo woman on pilgrimage to Kumbh Mela. Her travelogue Truck Bahoney Mac Mahoney depicts her ride on a ration truck across northeast India and Tibet in 1977. Her other notable works included Bama-bodhini, Srestha kabita, and Sita theke suru.

She was a well-known children's author in Bengali for her fairy tales and adventure stories, with girls as protagonist, having first written for children in 1979.

She was the chief editor of Bengali in the Macmillan's Modern Indian Novels in English Translation series.

== Recognition ==
Dev Sen received many national and international awards and honours, including: Gouridevi Memorial Award, Mahadevi Verma Award (1992), Celli Award from Rockefeller Foundation (1993), Sarat Award from Bhagalpur University of Bihar (1994), Prasad Puraskar, Sahitya Akademi Award (1999). She has also received Rabindra Puraskar, Kabir Samman, Samskriti Award, Kamal Kumari National Award (2004), Mystic Kalinga Literary Award (2017), and the Big Little Book Award for children's literature in 2017, when the award focused on Bengali writing. She was awarded the Padma Shri (2000), the fourth highest civilian award by the Government of India.

== Personal life and death ==
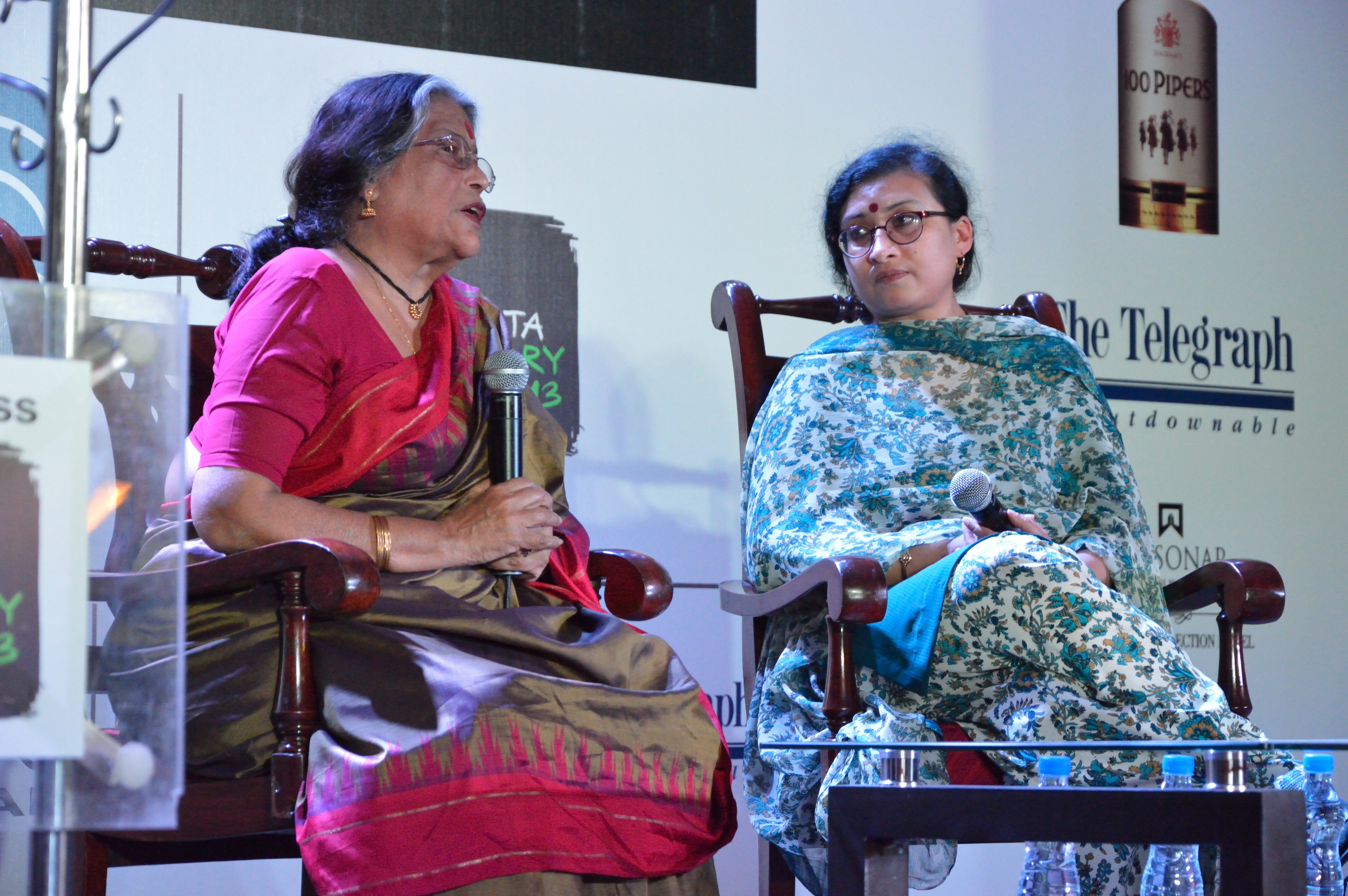
Nabaneeta Dev Sen with her daughter Antara (right) in 2013 in Kolkata

In 1958, she married Amartya Sen, an economist and academician and then a lecturer of economics at the Jadavpur University, who would be awarded the Nobel Prize four decades later.

She moved to Britain with Sen and they became the parents of two daughters, Antara Dev Sen and Nandana Sen.

After her divorce in 1976, she returned to Calcutta with her daughters. She had one adopted daughter Srabasti Basu.

Her hobbies included reading, records, and travelling. In addition to Bengali and English, she could read Hindi, Oriya, Assamese, French, German, Greek, Sanskrit, and Hebrew.

She died on 7 November 2019 in Kolkata following cancer.

== See also ==
- Bengali literature
- List of Bengali-language authors (alphabetical)
- Amartya Sen
