= Herbert (film) =

2005 Indian Bengali-language film

- Herbert film poster
- Directed by: Suman Mukhopadhyay
- Based on: Herbert by Nabarun Bhattacharya
- Starring: Subhasish Mukhopadhyay; Lily Chakravarty; Sabyasachi Chakraborty; Biswanath Basu; Kabir Suman
- Edited by: Arghyakamal Mitra
- Release date: 2005
- Country: India
- Language: Bengali

Herbert is a 2005 Bengali-language drama film directed by veteran theater director Suman Mukhopadhyay. It was based on Nabarun Bhattacharya's 1997 Sahitya Akademi Award winning novel of the same name.

== Plot ==
The story starts with one Herbert Sarkar cursing a group of people who just left his house. Herbert Sarkar is a forty-year-old crank, a self-proclaimed mystic who can speak with the dead and that is how he earns his living. Later that day after a heavy drinking spree with his friends, Herbert slits his wrist and commits suicide. The very next day he becomes the center of Police investigation as a posthumous bomber. Through a non-linear story telling and Nabarun's typical magic reality, the quixotic life story of Herbert is revealed.

Herbert Sarkar was the son of a wealthy Bengali film director. His family included his simpleton mother, film director father, and the family of his uncle, aunt and their two sons, Dhanna and Krishna. His father dies shortly after one of Herbert's birthday during a shooting with his mistress, Miss Lily. Tragedy strikes again, and his mother also dies due to accidental electrocution.

With all his property being enjoyed by his uncle's family, Herbert becomes the errand boy of the family who is ridiculed by everyone and is the butt of jokes of the neighbors due to his eccentric and unusual behavior. While his cousin Dhanna uses him to write the cheats for him to pass the exam, his elder cousin Krishna loves Herbert and his son Binu too, who is fond of "Haru Uncle". Krishna slowly introduced Herbert and Binu both, to the world of communism and ideology of Lenin, Mao, Stalin, Ho Chi Minh etc. and takes them to the screening of movies based on revolution stories. But soon, they leave as Krishna gets a job in a college as professor and leaves with his family. While leaving he hands him a copy of "Ten days that shook the world" and tells him he has left his books in one of the house's rooms, for him to read.

A few days later, a new family moved in the neighborhood. Herbert soon befriends the Banalata (Buki) and eventually they develop feelings for each other. But true to his tragic luck, Buki also moves out as her father again receives a job transfer. During this time he finds a trunk full of occult books and a human skull in the house, which belonged to one of his ancestors. Herbert starts reading all the books and soon take interest in the subject. The film moves a few years in future and Binu comes back to Kolkata with his father to get admitted in Presidency College during the 70's. While studying, Binu becomes a part of the Naxalite movement against the then Congress Government in West Bengal. Binu spends a good amount of time hiding from the police force while the police kill the rebels mercilessly. One such night, Binu visits Herbert with one of his friends. When Binu is about to leave, Herbert urges him to stay the night since it was the latter's birthday. But citing an urgent work at hand, Binu leaves and is shot at night by a police informer.

On his deathbed, Binu tells Herbert of his diary and where he has hidden it, behind the photo of goddess Kali in the prayer room. After a dream including Binu, Herbert claims that Binu has revealed the location of the diary to him in his dream and that, he, Herbert is able to communicate with the dead people. Herbert becomes a local sensation. He sets up a roaring business called "Dialogues with the Dead" for three years and for the first time in his life, earns money and the respect of others. However, his luck runs out when the International Rationalist Society declares him a fraud and threatens to turn him over to the law unless he closes shop. They soon visit Herbert, revealing that to be the very first scene from the movie. Unable to find any clues or motives behind the blast, Police Department declares this a fool's act by reading lines from the suicide note of Herbert.

At the end, it was revealed that Binu, during his last visit with Herbert, hid a few hand grenades, smuggled from Albania, inside Herbert's sleeping mattress and though he planned to return and take those out, he was shot on that very night. After Herbert died, to get rid of everything related to him, Dhanna sends the mattress along with the dead body for cremation. Once inside the cremation chamber, the grenades catch fire and explode, killing many people, an incident that turned him into a posthumous bomber.

== Cast ==
- Subhasish Mukherjee as Herbert Sarkar
- Neel Mukherjee as Binoy Sarkar (Binu)
- Lily Chakraborty as Jyathaima
- Sabyasachi Chakraborty as Police Officer
- Bratya Basu as Dhanna
- Kabir Suman as Interrogating Officer at Hospital
- Shyamal Chakraborty as Rationalist Society Member
- Debshankar Haldar as Herbert's father, Lalit Kumar
- Chandan Sen as Koton
- Supriyo Dutta as Surapati Marik
- Kanchan Mullick as Gyanban
- Biswanath Basu as Gobindo
- Joyraj Bhattacharjee as Young Herbert
- Anindita Das as Buki
- Shankar Debnath as Somnath
- Taranga Sarkar as Koka
- Bimal Chakraborty as Binu's father
- Subratanath Mukherjee as Herbert's Uncle
- Senjuti Roy Mukherjee as Herbert's Mother
- Kalyan Chakraborty as Police Commissioner
- Anindya Banerjee as Rationalist Society Member

== Critical reception ==
- New York Times: "And now for something completely different. "Herbert," a mad, messy and frequently amazing epic from India, features many of the qualities you expect from Bollywood: garish verve, dizzy excess, punishing duration, wild leaps in narrative tone and structure ... Movies are very much the point of this film: allusions to classic Hollywood and Indian cinema abound, and the energy of the French New Wave courses through the madcap plot. This is, rather incredibly, Mr. Mukhopadhyay’s first film, and it exhibits the passionate, more-is-more abandon of an artist bursting with welcome (if exhausting) enthusiasm onto the scene."
- MOMA: "Rife with allusions to classic Hollywood and to directors from Satyajit Ray to Jean-Luc Godard, Mukhopadhyay's debut feature is an astounding, encyclopedic parable: part magical-realist fable, part allegory of cultural imperialism. Shot in flashy reds and twilight blues that recall the Technicolor of MGM musicals, this wittily self-reflexive film features a remarkable lead performance by Mukherjee as the film's visionary madman."
- The Hindu: "Suman Mukhopadhyay, in his complex narrative style, uses Herbert brilliantly as the pendulum, which moves back and forth in time, capturing a period and juxtaposing it with its ideology and social ethos. Thus, the film not just covers the life of the protagonist, but also the city which has travelled through the times, governed by different ideologies. In this highly stylistic film, Suman Mukhopadhyay uses some brilliant techniques which gel amazingly well with the narrative."
- The Telegraph: "Mukherjee employs a range of cinematic, dramatic devices in the film. Flash-forward-flashbacks (parents, childhood) to Brechtian alienation (father behind movie camera). And strong influences of several European masters, especially Fellini is clearly evident. But despite such 'educated' references, somehow he never lets his ideas or storytelling become 'alien' or elitist. Maybe because he manages to keep his film grounded, rooted to our own culture-specific milieu, utilizing all its banal characteristics, colloquialism and linguistic slang (profanities bit too excessive though) with passion and flamboyance."
- The Statesman: "In Herbert, the film, literature meets theatre meets cinema to lead to a form that's a delicious carnival - a never-ending series of snapshots that continually push and threaten to rummage the fragile membrane that separates the world we know from what remains unknowable."

== Censorship ==
In spite of bagging utmost praise from a number of film critics, Herbert faced a strong censorship in terms of its screening in Nandan, the government-sponsored film and cultural centre in Kolkata. After Nandan withheld its screening in 2005, a signature campaign was organized for 'Herbert', as a protest against the censorship order." Suman Mukhopadhay, the director of Herbert said "Nandan’s preview committee had objected to the film, saying it will send out wrong signals to audiences. But they didn’t explain their position in writing." After a barrage of protests, it was eventually screened and ran for three weeks. The film has since gone on to achieve cult status, as much for its aesthetic merits.

== Awards ==
This film won the following awards:

- Silver Lotus for the National Film Award for Best Feature Film in Bengali, 2005.
- Audience Award at the Dhaka International Film Festival, 2006
- Lankesh Award for Best Debut Director in Bangalore, 2006.
