= Jete Nahi Dibo =

Poem by Rabindranath Tagore

- by Rabindranath Tagore
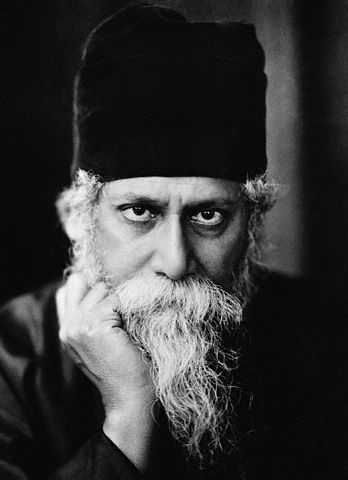
- Original title: যেতে নাহি দিব
- Language: Bengali

"Jete Nahi Dibo" (IPA: [d͡ʒet̪e nɑːhi d̪ibo], Bengali: যেতে নাহি দিব, English: "I Will Not Let You Go") is a poem written by Rabindranath Tagore in Bengali. It is included in the collection Sonar Tori (IPA:/ʃonar t̪ori/) and has 176 lines. An English translation was edited to 16 lines.

== Synopsis ==
The poet must return to his distant place of work after vacation at home. His little daughter declares she will not let him go. The poet contemplates her words after departing.
