= Putul Nacher Itikatha =

Bengali-language novel by Manik Bandopadhyay

The Puppets Tale
- Author: Manik Bandopadhyay
- Original title: Putul Nacher Itikatha
- Language: Bengali
- Genre: Sociological novels
- Published: 1935 (Magazine Series); 1936 (Printed Book)
- Publication place: India
- ISBN: 9788172016555

Putul Nacher Itikatha (eng The puppet's tale) is the third novel and the fourth printed book written by Bengali writer Manik Bandyopadhyay published in book form in 1936. It is one of the outstanding works of Manik Bandopadhyay. In one of his letters he wrote that this novel was a humble protest against those who tend to play with the lives of humans as if they were puppets. It introduces writer 's socialist mentality.

== History ==
The novel was published continuously in Bharatvarsha Patrika from Poush 1341 BS to Agrahayan 1342 BS. It was later published in book form in 1936.

== Summary ==
The central character of the novel is village doctor Shashi. He has no faith in God. The story and setting of the novel is based on the complex social relationships that exist between the other characters including Shashi, Shashi's father, and Kusum in the village background. Written on the premise of love, estrangement, envy and mutual sympathy of a decaying society, this novel is one of the best resources of Bengali literature .

== Characters ==
=== Main characters ===
Shashi is the main character in this novel. Having just passed his doctorate, he came to the village to say goodbye to his father in order to find a better life in a different culture or language. But in the end he can no longer go beyond the ordinary life.

The diversity of the environment of rural life and the stalks of reality grip him in a way that is beyond the capacity of Shashibabud to come out.

Kusum is the heroine of this novel. Her identity is that of a twenty-three-year-old barren girl, the wife of Paran ( one of the characters in the novel), a mysterious and variegated woman. Her whimsical, unconventional nature has made her mysterious.

Her ‘insane love’ for Shashi is the educational beauty of this novel. Kusum's unrequited love eventually takes on another form, another dimension. 'A lively mysterious woman, full of vitality, indomitable perseverance, Kusum is the messenger of mystery of life. When Shashi calls her, Kusum says, “Who are you calling, chotobabu?

=== Other characters ===
In addition, the author has brought various real characters like Bindu, Nanda, Kumud, Moti, Jaya, Banabihari, Nandalal, Jamini Kabiraj and Sendidi from different levels of life.

== Adaptation ==
=== Film ===
- In 1949, a Bengali drama film Putul Nacher Itikatha was released under the banner of K K Production. The film was directed by Asit Bandyopadhyay, starring Goutam Mukhopadhyay, Kali Banerjee and Nilima Das.
- Based on the same novel, the film Putulnacher Itikatha was directed by Sumon Mukhopadhyaya and produced by Samiran Das under the banner of Kaleidoscope Entertainment. Jaya Ahsan played the role of Kusum and other characters include Abir Chatterjee, Parambrata Chatterjee, Dhritiman Chatterjee and Ananya Chatterjee. This film was released on 1 August 2025.
