= Suman Mukherjee =

Indian film director (born 1966)

Suman Mukhopadhyay
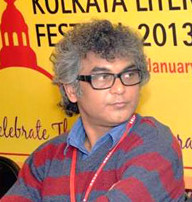
- Mukhopadhyay at the Apeejay Kolkata Literary Festival in 2013
- Born: 20 November 1966 (age 59); Howrah, West Bengal, India
- Occupation: Director
- Father: Arun Mukhopadhyay
- Relatives: Sujan Mukhopadhyay (brother)

Suman Mukhopadhyay (Bengali: সুমন মুখোপাধ্যায়), or Suman Mukherjee (born 20 November 1966) is an Indian film director. His popular films are Herbert, Kangal Malsat, Shesher Kobita (2014).

== Career ==
Suman was a George A. Miller Visiting Artist at University of Illinois at Urbana-Champaign to work for Tagore Festival. In 2022 he was on a Fulbright Fellowship with Columbia University, New York.

His first cinematic directorial debut film was Herbert which was released in 2005 and won the National Award for Best Bengali film. His feature film "Nazarband" (2020) premiered at Busan International Film Festival. His earlier film "Asamapta"(Incomplete), premiered in IFFLA, USA. Before that "Shesher Kabita" (The Last Poem) with Rahul Bose and Konkona Sen Sharma premiered at the Dubai International Film Festival and was released on 7 August 2015. "Kangal Malsat"(The War Cry of the Beggars) his 4th feature film released in August 2013. Mahanagar@Kolkata was completed in 2009. The film was screened in Munich, Kerala and New York film festivals. His second film Chaturanga, based on Tagore's novel, was completed in 2008 and premiered at the Montreal World Film Festival. Chaturanga was screened in 36 national and international festivals. The film received a Gran Prix award at Bridgefest, Sarajevo; the Best Director award at the Philadelphia Independent Film Festival and the Golden Palm at Mexico International Film Festival.

Recently Mukhopadhyay has done a Zee5 original feature film Posham Pa and directed five episodes of Parchhayee based on Ruskin Bond stories.

Suman's latest theatre productions are "Tiner Tolowar" (Utpal Dutt), "Bechara B.B" (based on Brecht's works), "Aajker Sajahan" (Utpal Dutt) and an adaptation of Chekhov's "Uncle Vanya". In 2022, he directed "Shikhandi", a solo act, which opened in New Jersey. (June 2022). Mukhopadhyay has done theatre productions ranging from European drama to major adaptations of Bengali works. He used to be a part of the Bengali theatre Group Chetana. Among his many works some are The Cherry Orchard (Anton Chekhov) with National School of Drama, Raja Lear (Soumitra Chatterjee as King Lear) with Minerva Repertory Theatre, Sunyo Sudhu Sunyo Noy, Bisarjan (Rabindranath Tagore), Teesta Paarer Brittanto and Samay Asamayer Brittanto, adapted from the novels by Debesh Roy and Mephisto, based on Klaus Mann's German novel. He has also staged Rabindranath Tagore's Raktakarabi; Falguni-Prelude, Shakespeare/Brecht's Coriolanus and Śūdraka's The Little Clay Cart. He directed The Man of the Heart (Life and Times of Lalon Fokir) at the University of California, Berkeley and Girish Karnad's Nagamandala at the Department of Theatre, Kalamazoo College, Michigan. Man of the Heart was also invited to Barbican Centre, London.

Suman Mukhopadhyay's feature film "Putulnacher Itikatha" (The Puppet's Tale), based on the novel by Manik Bandyopadhyay, was selected for the Big Screen Competition in the 54th International Film Festival Rotterdam, 2025.

== Filmography ==
=== Feature films ===
- Herbert (2005)
- Chaturanga (2008)
- Mahanagar@Kolkata (2009)
- Kangal Malsat (2013)
- Shesher Kobita (2014)
- Asamapta (2017)
- Posham Pa (2019) - Hindi
- Nazarband (2020)
- Putulnacher Itikatha (2025)

== Awards ==
"Nazarband" - Audience Award at River to River Indian Film Festival, Florence

"Posham Pa" - Kali Film Award at Female Filmmakers Festival, Berlin

Recipient of MPA/APSA Script Development Award at Asia Pacific Screen Awards, Brisbane

- His film Chaturanga received the Gran Prix at Bridge Fest, Sarajevo; Best Director at Philadelphia Independent Film Festival and the Golden Palm at Mexico International Film Festival.
- His film Herbert for Silver Lotus for the National Film Award for Best Feature Film in Bengali, 2005.Audience Award at the Dhaka International Film Festival, 2006.

== Others ==
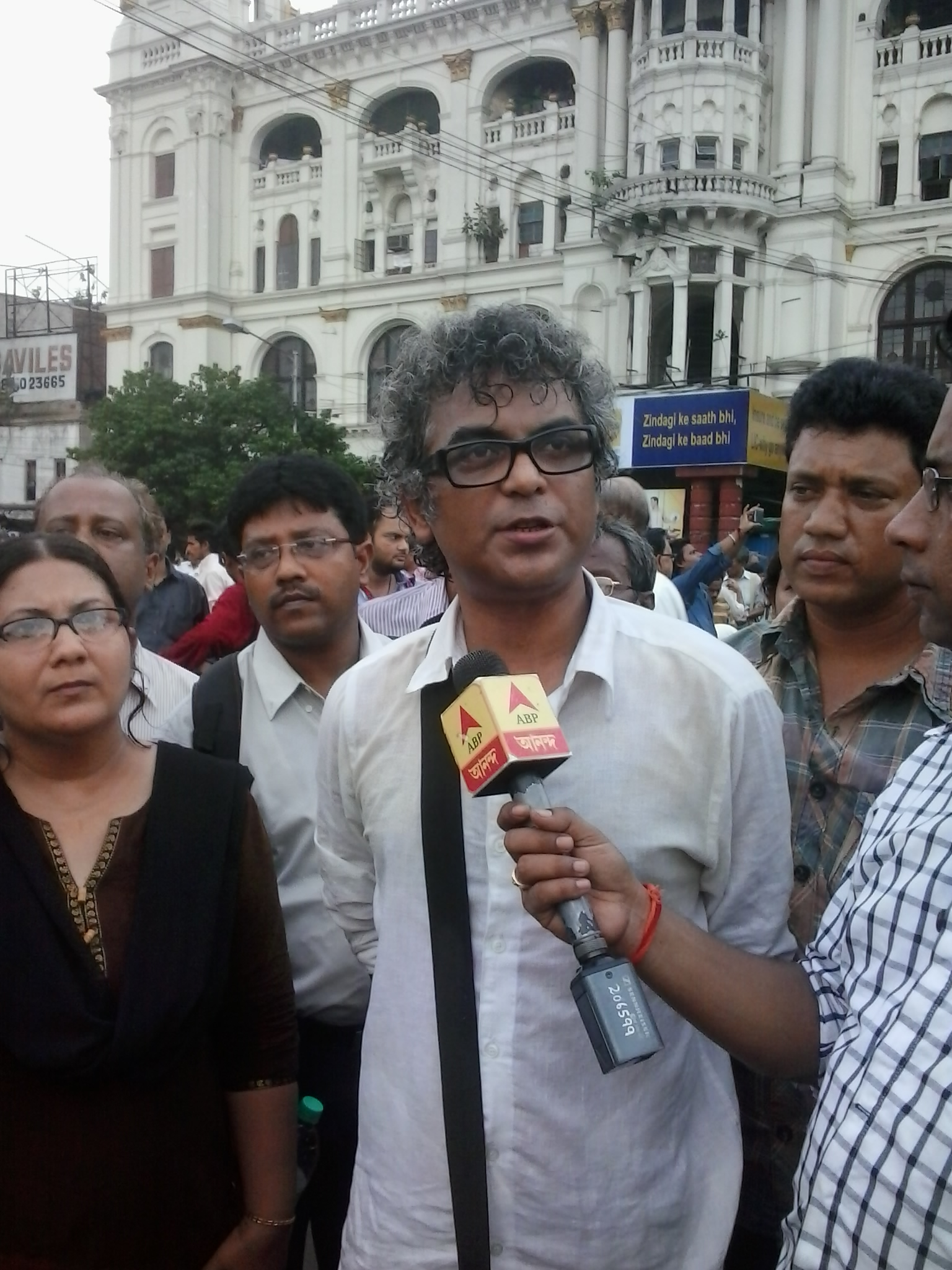
Suman Mukhopadhyay in a rally of intellectuals against Kamduni Murder Case

Mukhopadhyay is a known face of Civil Society Movement in West Bengal from the tenure of Left Front Government. He also participated in rallies or talk shows against political violence by all the parties. On 21 June he joined in a protest march in Metro Channel with other intellectuals of Kolkata led by poet Shankha Ghosh in protest against the growing crimes against women in the state and the 2013 Kamduni gang rape and murder case.
