= Mahasweta Devi =

Indian writer and activist

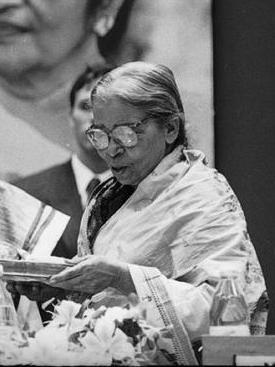
- Devi at the Ramon Magsaysay Award ceremony (1997)
- Born: 14 January 1926; Dacca, Bengal Presidency, British India
- Died: 28 July 2016 (aged 90); Kolkata, West Bengal, India
- Education: Visva-Bharati University; University of Calcutta
- Occupations: Writer, activist
- Notable work: Hajar Churashir Maa (Mother of 1084); Aranyer Adhikar (The Right of the Forest); Titu Mir
- Spouse(s): Bijon Bhattacharya (1947–1962); Asit Gupta (1965–1976)
- Children: Nabarun Bhattacharya
- Relatives: Manish Ghatak (father); Ritwik Ghatak (uncle)
- Awards: Padma Vibhushan; Padma Shri; Sahitya Akademi Award; Ramon Magsaysay Award; Jnanpith Award

Mahasweta Devi (Bengali pronunciation: [mɔhaʃːeta debi]; 14 January 1926 – 28 July 2016) was an Indian Bengali language writer and activist. Her notable literary works include Hajar Churashir Maa, Rudali, and Aranyer Adhikar. She was a leftist who worked for the rights and empowerment of the tribal people (Lodha and Shabar) of West Bengal, Bihar, Madhya Pradesh and Chhattisgarh states of India. She was honoured with various literary awards such as the Sahitya Akademi Award (in Bengali), Jnanpith Award and Ramon Magsaysay Award along with India's civilian awards Padma Shri and Padma Vibhushan.

== Early life and education ==
Mahasweta Devi was born in a Bengali Brahmin family on 14 January 1926 in Dacca, British India (now Dhaka, Bangladesh). Her father, Manish Ghatak, was a poet and novelist of the Kallol movement, who used the pseudonym Jubanashwa (Bengali: যুবনাশ্ব). Ghatak's brother was filmmaker Ritwik Ghatak. Devi's mother, Dharitri Devi, was also a writer and a social worker whose brothers include sculptor Sankha Chaudhury and the founder-editor of Economic and Political Weekly of India, Sachin Chaudhury.

Devi's first schooling was in Dhaka, Eden Montessori School (1930). After that, she moved to West Bengal (now in India). Then she studied in Mission Girls' High School, Midnapore (1935), following which she was admitted to Santiniketan (1936 to 1938). Then she studied at Beltala Girls' School (1939-1941) where she finished her matriculation. In 1944, she got I.A. from Ashutosh College. She attended Rabindranath Tagore-founded Visva-Bharati University and completed a B.A. (Hons) in English, and then finished an M.A. in English at Calcutta University.

== Career ==
=== Literary works ===
Devi wrote over 100 novels and over 20 collections of short stories primarily written in Bengali but often translated them to other languages. Her first novel, titled Jhansir Rani, based on a biography of the Rani of Jhansi was published in 1956. She had toured the Jhansi region to record information and folk songs from the local people for the novel.

Mahasweta Devi's specialisation lay in the studies of Adivasi, Dalit and Marginalized citizens with a focus on their women. They were associated as protestor in the face of British colonialism, the Mahajanas and upper class corruption and injustice. She lived in the Adivasi villages in West Bengal, Bihar, Madhya Pradesh, Chhattisgarh years after years, befriending them and learning from them. She has embodied their struggles and sacrifices in her words and characters. She had claimed that her stories aren't her creation, they are the stories of the people of her country. Such an example is her work "Chotti Mundi Ebong Tar Tir".

In 1964, she began teaching at Vijaygarh Jyotish Ray College (an affiliated college of the University of Calcutta system). In those days Vijaygarh Jyotish Ray College was an institution for working-class women students. During that period she also worked—as a journalist and as a creative writer. She studied the Lodhas and Shabars, the tribal communities of West Bengal, women and dalits. In her elaborate Bengali fiction, she often depicted the brutal oppression on the tribal people and untouchables by the powerful authoritarian upper-caste landlords, money-lenders, and venal government officials. She wrote of the source of her inspiration:

I have always believed that the real history is made by ordinary people. I constantly come across the reappearance, in various forms, of folklore, ballads, myths and legends, carried by ordinary people across generations. ... The reason and inspiration for my writing are those people who are exploited and used, and yet do not accept defeat. For me, the endless source of ingredients for writing is in these amazingly noble, suffering human beings. Why should I look for my raw material elsewhere, once I have started knowing them? Sometimes it seems to me that my writing is really their doing.

Postcolonial scholar Gayatri Chakravorty Spivak has translated Devi's short stories into English and published three books Imaginary Maps (1995, Routledge), Old Woman (1997, Seagull), The Breast Stories (1997, Seagull).

=== Social activity ===
Mahasweta Devi raised her voice several times against the discrimination suffered by tribal people in India. Devi's 1977 novel Aranyer Adhikar (Right to the Forest) was about the life of Birsa Munda. And in June 2016, consequent to Devi's activism, the Jharkhand State Government finally saw to the removal of the manacles from the figure of Munda, which had been part of the commemorative sculpture of the notable young tribal leader due to its having been based on a photograph dating from the era of British rule.

Devi spearheaded the movement against the industrial policy of the earlier Communist Party of India (Marxist) government of West Bengal. Specifically, she stridently criticised confiscation from farmers of large tracts of fertile agricultural land by the government which then ceded it to industrial houses at throwaway prices. She supported the candidature of Mamata Banarjee in the 2011 West Bengal Legislative Assembly election which resulted in the end of the 34-year long rule of CPI(M). She had connected the policy to the commercialisation of Santiniketan of Rabindranath Tagore, where she spent her formative years. Her lead in the Nandigram agitation resulted in a number of intellectuals, artists, writers and theatre workers joining in protest of the controversial policy and particularly its implementation in Singur and Nandigram.

She is known to have helped the noted writer Manoranjan Bypari to come into prominence as his initial writings were published in her journal and as prompted by her.

At the Frankfurt Book Fair 2006, when India was the first country to be the Fair's second time guest nation, she made an impassioned inaugural speech wherein she moved the audience to tears with her lines taken from the famous film song "Mera Joota Hai Japani" by Raj Kapoor.

This is truly the age where the Joota (shoe) is Japani (Japanese), Patloon (pants) is Englistani (British), the Topi (hat) is Roosi (Russian), But the Dil... Dil (heart) is always Hindustani (Indian)... My country, Torn, Tattered, Proud, Beautiful, Hot, Humid, Cold, Sandy, Shining India. My country.

In 1997, president Shankar Dayal Sharma commuted two death sentences after Devi led a petition campaign. In 2012, she was one of more than 215 signatories, along with Nandita Das, Aamir Bashir, and Anusha Rizvi, to a petition delivered to president Pranab Mukherjee that opposed the death penalty after the conviction of Ajmal Kasab following the 2008 Mumbai attacks and instead favoured life imprisonment. The letter stated, "In the land of Buddha, Mahavira and Gandhiji, let it not be said there is no place in our hearts for mercy."

== Personal life ==
On 27 February 1947, she married renowned playwright Bijon Bhattacharya, who was one of the founding fathers of the Indian People's Theatre Association movement. In 1948, she gave birth to Nabarun Bhattacharya, who became a novelist and political critic. She worked in a post office but was fired for her communist leaning. She went on to do various jobs, such as selling soaps and writing letters in English for illiterate people. In 1962, she married author Asit Gupta after divorcing Bhattacharya. In 1976, the relationship with Gupta ended.

== Death ==
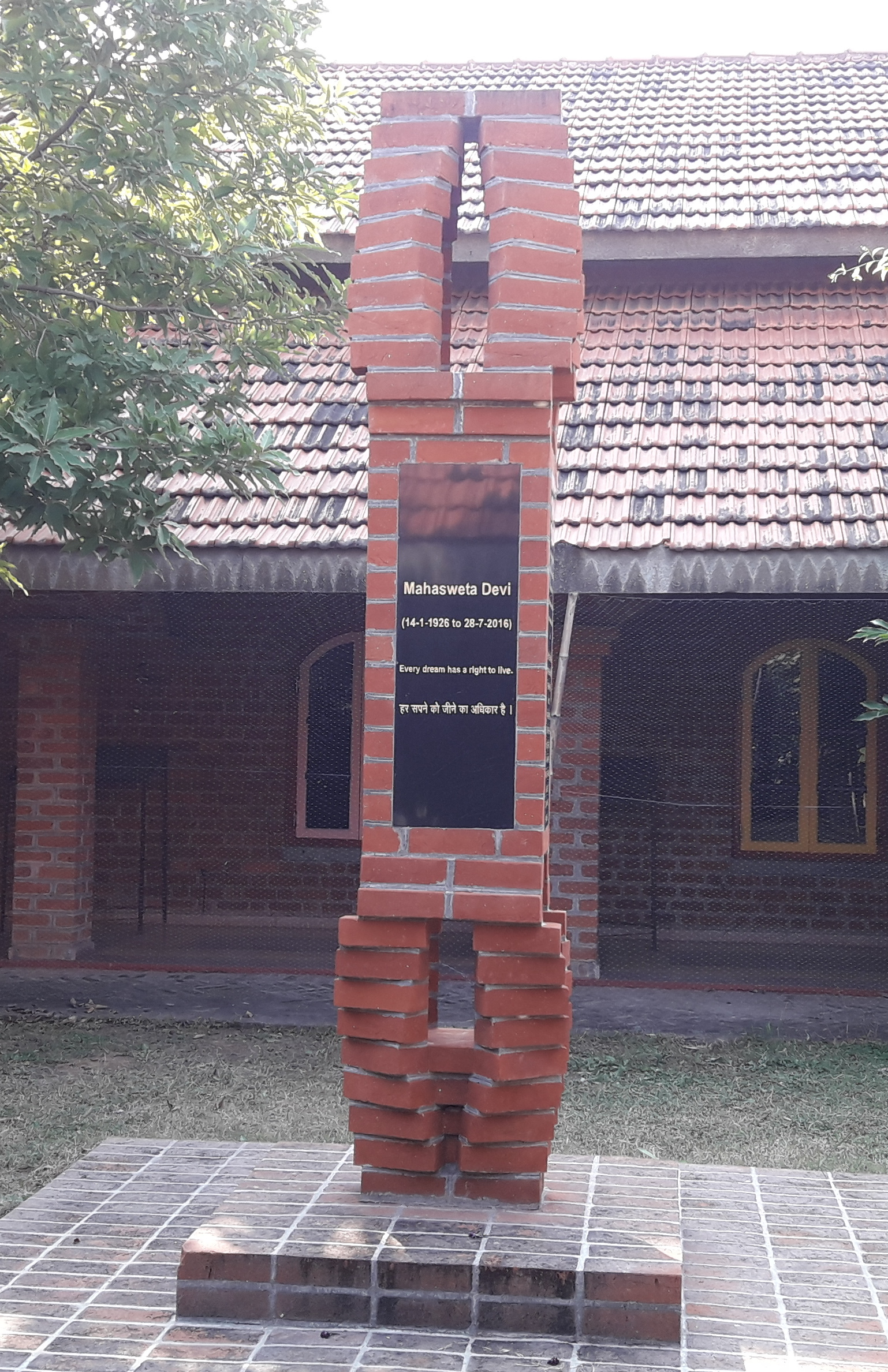
Mahasweta Devi Memorial unveiled at Adivasi Academy of Tejgadh, Gujarat

On 23 July 2016, Devi suffered a major heart attack and was admitted to Belle Vue Clinic, Kolkata. Devi died of multiple organ failure on 28 July 2016, aged 90. She had suffered from diabetes, sepsis and urinary infection.

On her death, Mamata Banerjee, Chief Minister of West Bengal tweeted "India has lost a great writer. Bengal has lost a glorious mother. I have lost a personal guide. Mahasweta Di rest in peace." Prime Minister Narendra Modi tweeted "Mahashweta Devi wonderfully illustrated the might of the pen. A voice of compassion, equality & justice, she leaves us deeply saddened. RIP."

== Awards and recognition ==
- 1979: Sahitya Akademi Award (Bengali): – Aranyer Adhikar (novel)
- 1986: Padma Shri for Social Work
- 1996: Jnanpith Award – the highest literary award from the Bharatiya Jnanpith
- 1997: Ramon Magsaysay Award – Journalism, Literature, and the Creative Communication Arts for "compassionate crusade through art and activism to claim for tribal peoples a just and honorable place in India's national life."
- 2003: Officier de l'Ordre des Arts et des Lettres
- 2006: Padma Vibhushan – the second highest civilian award from the Government of India
- 2007: SAARC Literary Award
- 2009: Shortlisted for the Man Booker International Prize
- 2010: Yashwantrao Chavan National Award
- 2011: Banga Bibhushan – the highest civilian award from the Government of West Bengal
- 2014 : Mamoni Raisom Goswami National Award for Literature constituted by Asam Sahitya Sabha and sponsored by Numaligarh Refinery Ltd., Assam
- On 14 January 2018, Google honoured Mahasweta Devi on her 92nd birth anniversary, celebrating her work by creating a doodle on her.

== Major works ==
Devi's major works include:

- Jhansi Rani (1956, biography)
  - The Queen of Jhansi, by Mahasweta Devi (translated by Sagaree and Mandira Sengupta). This book is a reconstruction of the life of Rani Lakshmi Bai from extensive research of both historical documents (collected mostly by G. C. Tambe, grandson of the Queen) and folk tales, poetry and oral tradition; the original in Bengali was published in 1956; the English translation by Seagull Books, Calcutta, 2000, ISBN 8170461758
- Master Saab also known as Massaheb (The School Teacher), which is based on Bihar's communist led armed revolution for land reforms. This novel is said to be based on life of naxal leader Jagdish Mahto, who became a well known figure in Bhojpur for his contribution to armed struggle of the poor against the landlords.
- Hajar Churashir Maa (1974, novel, Mother of 1084)
- Aranyer Adhikar (1979, novel, Right to the Forest)
- Agnigarbha (1978, short stories collection)
- Murti (1979, short stories collection)
- Neerete Megh (1979, short stories collection)
- Stanyadayani (1980, short stories collection)
- Chotti Munda Ebong Tar Tir (1980, novel, Chotti Munda and His Arrow)

=== Film adaptations ===
- Sunghursh (1968), Hindi film based on short story Layli Asmaner Ayna
- Rudaali (1993)
- Bayen (Hindi) (1993) a film based on short story directed by Gul Bahar Singh
- Hazaar Chaurasi Ki Maa (1998)
- Maati Maay (2006), Marathi film based on short story Baayen
- Gangor (2010), Italian film based on short story Choli Ke Peeche
- Ullas (Bengali film based on three short stories— Daur, Mahadu Ekti Rupkatha and Anna Aranya) directed by Ishwar Chakraborty, released in 2012.

== In popular culture ==
Mahananda, a Bengali film based on her life and works, directed by acclaimed director Arindam Sil was released in 2022. Gargi Roychowdhury essayed the titular role in the film.

Mahasweta Devi Memorial Academy (2018), Jangipur, Murshidabad.

== See also ==
- List of Indian writers
