= Sudama Panday 'Dhoomil' =

Indian poet (1936–1975)

Sudama Pandey "Dhoomil" (9 November 1936 – 10 February 1975) was an Indian poet who wrote in Hindi. He is known for his revolutionary writings and his "protest-poetry" along with Gajanan Madhav Muktibodh.

Known as the angry young man of Hindi poetry because of his rebellious writings, during his lifetime he published just one collection of poems, Sansad se Sarak Tak ("From the Parliament to the Street"), but another collection of his work entitled Kal Sunna Mujhe was released posthumously, and in 1979 went on to win the Sahitya Akademi Award in Hindi literature. Sudama Pandey Ka Prajatantra, in 1984.[8] and Dhoomil Samagra in 2021 (in 3 Vol.) was published by his son Dr. Ratnashankar Pandey.

== Biography ==
What I inherited were citizenship

in the neighbourhood of a jail
and gentlemanliness

in front of a slaughter house.
- "The City, Evening, and an Old Man: Me": ‘Dhoomil’

Pandey was born on 9 November 1936 in Khewali, Varanasi district, Uttar Pradesh. After successfully passing out of secondary education at the tenth-grade level, he joined the Industrial Training Institute (ITI), Varanasi where he passed out with a Diploma in Electrics, and later he joined the same institution as an instructor in the Electricals Department.

He died on 10 February 1975, aged 38.

In 2006, the Bharatiya Janata Party (BJP), a nationalist party, raised an objection in the Indian parliament over the inclusion of one of his radical poems "Mochiram" in the NCERT Hindi textbooks which subsequently was replaced by one of his other poems – "Ghar Main Wapsi".

The last book of Dhoomil, Sudama Pandey Ka Prajatantra, was published by his son Ratnashankar Pandey.

== Works ==
=== Poetry collections ===
- Sansad Se Sadak Tak - 1972
- Kal Sunana Mujhe - 1976
- Sudaama Paande Ka Prajaatantr - 1984
- Srikrishna Singh biography1988
- Dhoomil Samagra (In set of 3 Vol.) - 2021
