= Shankha Ghosh =

Indian poet (1932–2021)

Sankha Ghosh
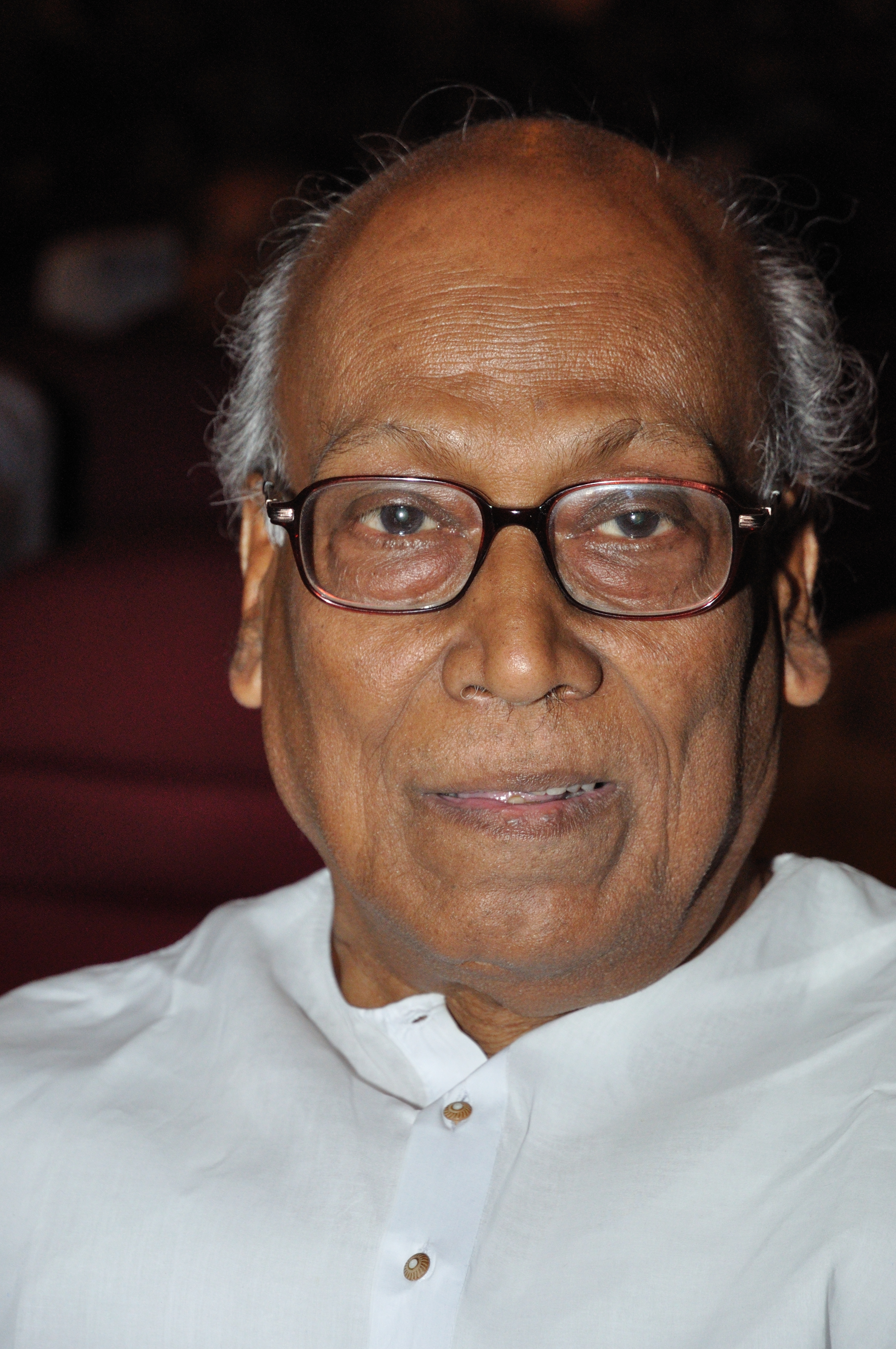
- Ghosh in 2011
- Born: Chittapriya Ghosh; 5 February 1932; Chandpur, Bengal Presidency, British India
- Died: 21 April 2021 (aged 89); Kolkata, West Bengal, India
- Education: University of Calcutta
- Known for: Bengali literature
- Title: Poet
- Spouse: Pratima Ghosh (née Biswas)
- Awards: Padma Bhushan (2011); Jnanpith Award (2016); Sahitya Akademi Award (1977)

Sankha Ghosh (born Chittapriya Ghosh; 5 February 1932 – 21 April 2021) was an Indian poet and literary critic. He was born in Chandpur District of the then Bengal Presidency, present day Bangladesh. His ancestral home was at Banaripara Upazila in Barisal District. He spent his childhood and adolescence in Ishwardi Upazila of Pabna District, which was his father's workplace.

Ghosh passed matriculation from Chandraprabha Vidyapitha, Pabna. He got his undergraduate degree in Arts in Bengali from Presidency College, Kolkata in 1951 and subsequently his master's degree from the University of Calcutta in the year 1954.

Acclaimed in India, his work lacks global recognition due to poor English translations.

== Career ==
Ghosh taught at many educational institutions, including Bangabasi College, City College (all affiliated to the University of Calcutta) and at Jadavpur University, Jangipur College, Berhampore Girls' College all in Kolkata and West Bengal. He retired from Jadavpur University in 1992. In 1967, he participated in the International Writing Program's Fall Residency at the University of Iowa in Iowa City, IA. He also taught at Delhi University, the Indian Institute of Advanced Studies at Shimla, and at the Visva-Bharati University. He won many awards including Jnanpith Award in 2016. His pen name was Kuntak. Among the most respected names in contemporary Bengali literature, Ghosh was one of the 'Pancha Pandavas' — along with Shakti Chattopadhyay, Sunil Gangopadhyay, Binoy Majumdar and Utpal Kumar Basu — who gave a new identity to the Bengali literary world.

Ghosh was a member of the Social Network for Assistance to People (informally Association SNAP) that published a ground-breaking survey in 2014 that revealed the extent of poverty among the Muslim community of West Bengal.

== Death ==
Ghosh and his wife tested positive for COVID-19 on 14 April 2021. Later he suffered from several complications and died on 21 April 2021, at his home in Kolkata. 8 days after poet's death, his wife Pratima Ghosh also died from COVID-19 complications.

== Literary contributions ==
Shankha Ghosh made contribution to the world of Bengali poetry. 'Days and Nights', 'Babar's Prayer', 'Face Covered in Advertisement', 'Gandharva Poems' are his notable books of poetry. Although Shankha Ghosh was initially known as a 'poet', his prose works are numerous. He has combined poetry and prose. He was an eminent Rabindra expert, noting Rabindranath Tagore's 'Ocampore Rabindranath', 'A Amir Awaran', 'Kaler Matra O Rabindra Natak', 'Chhander Baranda' and 'Damini's Song'. 'Words and Truth', 'Urvashir Hasi', and 'Ahan Sab Alik' are his other notable prose works. His writings have been studied and popular in Bengali for years. Ghosh's poetic self had a twofold trajectory. On one hand, that self is always aware of the repercussions of all the socio-political events of the day. Ghosh's sensitive poetry roared against any social injustice. The people of the deprived classes, the underprivileged poor can access the poetry of Shankha Ghosh as a companion for their daily suffering. Ghosh's work delineates social inequality and the lack of justice in late twentieth - early twenty first century Bengal.

== Works ==
Poetics

1. Dinguli rātaguli (Bengali: দিনগুলি রাতগুলি) (1956)

2. Ekhan samaẏa naẏ (Bengali: এখন সময় নয়) (1967)

3. Nihita pātālachāẏā (Bengali: নিহিত পাতালছায়া) (1967)

4. Saṅkha ghōṣēr śrēṣṭha kabitā (Bengali: শঙ্খ ঘোষের শ্রেষ্ঠ কবিতা) (1970)

5. Adima latāgulmamaẏ (Bengali: আদিম লতাগুল্মময়) (1972)

6. Mūrkha baṛa sāmājika naẏa (Bengali: মূর্খ বড় সামাজিক নয়) (1974)

7. Baburēr prārthanā (Bengali: বাবরের প্রার্থনা) (1976)

8. Minibook[ মিনিবুক] (1978)

9. Tumi to temon gaurī na'ō [তুমি তেমন গৌরী নও ](1978)

10. Panjarē dāṛēr Shabda [পাঁজরে দাঁড়ের শব্দ ](1980)

11. Kabitāsangraha -1[ কবিতাসংগ্রহ -১ ] (1980)

12. Praharajōṛā tritāla [ প্রহরজোড়া ত্রিতাল](1982)

13. Mukh ḍhēkē jay Bigyapanē[মুখ ঢেকে যায় বিজ্ঞাপনে ] (1984)

14. Bandhurā māti tarajāẏa [বন্ধুরা মাতি তরজায় ](1984)

15. Dhuma lēgēchē hr̥idakamalē [ধুম লেগেছে হৃদকমলে ](1984)

16. Kabitāsaṅgraha - 2[ কবিতাসংগ্রহ - ২ ] (1991)

17.Lainei chilāma bābā [ লাইনেই ছিলাম বাবা](1993)

18. Gāndharva kabitāguccha[ গান্ধর্ব কবিতাগুচ্ছ ] (1994)

19.Saṅkha ghōṣēr nirbācita prēmēr kabitā[ শঙ্খ ঘোষের নির্বাচিত প্রেমের কবিতা] (1994)

20. Mini kabitār boi[মিনি কবিতার বই ] (1994)

21. Saber uparē śāmiẏānā [ শবের উপরে শামিয়ানা](1996)

22.Chhandēr bhitarē ēto andhakār [ ছন্দের ভিতরে এত অন্ধকার](1999)

23. Jol'i pāṣāṇ hoẏē āchē [ জলই পাষাণ হয়ে আছে ](2004)

24. Samasta khatēr mukhē pali [ সমস্ত ক্ষতের মুখে পলি ](2007)

25. Māṭikhōm̐ṛā purōnō karōṭi[ মাটিখোঁড়া পুরোনো করোটি] (2009)

26. Gōṭādēśajōṛā ja'ughara [ গোটাদেশজোড়া জউঘর ](2010)

27. Hāsikhuśi mukhē sarbanāś[ হাসিখুশি মুখে সর্বনাশ] (2011)

28. Prati praśnē jēgē ōṭhē bhiṭē [ প্রতি প্রশ্নে জেগে ওঠে ভিটে](2012)

29.Bahus Various stabdha paṛē āchē[বহুস্বর স্তব্ধ পড়ে আছে ] (2014)

30.prēmēra kabitā [প্রেমের কবিতা ](2014)

31 . śaṅkha ghōṣēra kabitāsaṅgraha[শঙ্খ ঘোষের কবিতাসংগ্রহ ] (2015)

32. śuni nīraba ciṯkāra[ শুনি নীরব চিৎকার ] (2015)

33. ē'ō ēka byathā upaśama [এও এক ব্যথা উপশম ](2017)

Prose

1. kālēra mātrā ō rabīndranāṭak [ কালের মাত্রা ও রবীন্দ্রনাটকএ](1969)

2. niḥśabdēra tarjanī[ নিঃশব্দের তর্জনী ] ,1972

2. Chhonder Baranda (ছন্দের বারান্দা) 1972

3. E Amir Aboron (এ আমির আবরণ) 1980

4. Urbashir Hasi (উর্বশীর হাসি) 1981

5. Shobdo Ar Satya (শব্দ আর সত্য) 1982

6. Nirmhan Ar Srishti (নির্মাণ আর সৃষ্টি) 1982

7. Kalpanar Historia (কল্পনার হিস্টোরিয়া) 1984

8. Journal (জার্নাল) 1985

9. Ghumiye Pora Album (ঘুমিয়ে পড়া এলবাম) 1986

10. Kobitar Muhurto (কবিতার মুহূর্ত) 1987

11. Kobitalekha Kobitapora (কবিতালেখা কবিতাপড়া) 1988

12. Aitihyer Bistar (ঐতিহ্যের বিস্তার) 1989

13. Chhandamoy Jibon (ছন্দময় জীবন) 1993

14. Kobir Abhipray (কবির অভিপ্রায়) 1994

15. Ekhono Shob Alik K (এখন সব অলীক ক) 1994

16. Boiyer Ghor (বইয়ের ঘর) 1996

17. Somoyer Jolchhobi (সময়ের জলছবি) 1998

18. Kobir Barmā (কবির বর্ম) 1998

19. Ishara Abirat (ইশারা অবিরত) 1999

20. Ei Shahar Rakhal (এই শহর রাখাল) 2000

21. Ichhamatir Mosha: Bhraman (ইচ্ছামতির মশা : ভ্রমণ) 2002

22. Daminir Gan (দামিনির গান) 2002

23. Gadyasangraha 1-6 (গদ্যসংগ্রহ ১-৬) 2002

24. Abishwase’r Bastab (অবিশ্বাসের বাস্তব) 2003

25. Gadyasangraha - 7 (গদ্যসংগ্রহ - ৭) 2003

26. Saman’yo Asaman’yo (সামান্য অসামান্য) 2006

27. Prem Padabali (প্রেম পদাবলী) 2006

28. Chhera Kambiser Bag (ছেঁড়া ক্যামবিসের ব্যাগ) 2007

29. Somaypote Shankha Ghosh: Kobita Sonkolon (সময়পটে শঙ্খ ঘোষ : কবিতা সংকলন) 2008

30. Bhinna Rucir Adhikar (ভিন্ন রুচির অধিকার) 2009

31. Aroop Ar Udbhavon (আরোপ আর উদ্ভাবন) 2011

32. Bot Pakur Er Phena (বট পাকুড়ের ফেনা) 2011

33. Gadyasangraha - 8 (গদ্যসংগ্রহ - ৮) 2013

34. Dekhar Drishti (দেখার দৃষ্টি) 2014

35. Ayowar Diary (আয়ওয়ার ডায়েরি) 2014

36. Nirbachito Prabandha: Rabindranath (নির্বাচিত প্রবন্ধ : রবীন্দ্রনাথ) 2014

37. Nirbachito Prabandha: Nana Prasanga (নির্বাচিত প্রবন্ধ : নানা প্রসঙ্গ) 2014

38. Nirbachito Gadyalekha (নির্বাচিত গদ্যলেখা) 2015

39. Gadyasangraha - 9 (গদ্যসংগ্রহ - ৯) 2015

40. He Mahajiban: Rabindra Prasanga (হে মহাজীবন : রবীন্দ্র প্রসঙ্গ) 2016

41. Berate Jabar Sinri (বেড়াতে যাবার সিঁড়ি) 2016

42. Alpo Swalpo Katha (অল্প স্বল্প কথা) 2016

43. Nirahang Shilpi (নিরহং শিল্পী) 2017

44. Gadyasangraha-10 (গদ্যসংগ্রহ-১০) 2018

45. Lekha Jakhan Hoy Na (লেখা যখন হয় না) 2019

46. Param Bandhu Pradyumna (পরম বন্ধু প্রদ্যুমন) 2019

47. Sandhyandir Jole: Bangladesh Sonkolon (সন্ধ্যানদীর জলে :বাংলাদেশ সংকলন) 2019

48. Chhere Rekhei Dhore Rakha (ছেড়ে রেখেই ধরে রাখা) 2021

== Awards ==
- Narsingh Das Puraskar (1977, for Murkha baro, samajik nay)
- Sahitya Akademi Award (1977, for Baabarer praarthanaa)
- Rabindra Puraskar (1989, for Dhum legechhe hrit kamale)
- Saraswati Samman for his anthology Gandharba Kabitaguccha
- Sahitya Akademi Translation Prize for translation of Taledanda (Kannada) Play into Bengali named Raktakalyan (1999)
- Desikottam by Visva-Bharati (1999)
- D.Litt. by Vidyasagar University (2010)
- Padma Bhushan by the Government of India (2011)
- Hall of Fame Lifetime Achievement "Sahityabrahma" Award by the World Forum for Journalists and Writers (WFJW) (2015)
- D.Litt. by Indian Institute of Engineering Science and Technology, Shibpur, India (2015)
- Jnanpith Award by the Government of India (2016)
