= Manik Bandopadhyay =

Indian writer and poet

Manik Bandyopadhyay
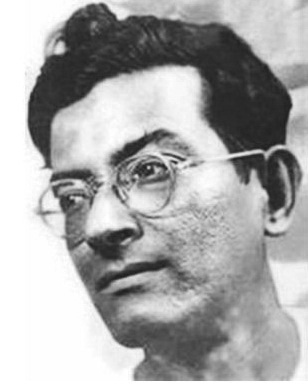
- Born: Prabodhkumar Bandyopadhyay; 19 May 1908; Dumka, Bengal Presidency, British India
- Died: 3 December 1956 (aged 48); Kolkata, West Bengal, India
- Occupation: Writer
- Spouse: Kamala Bandyopadhyay
- Children: Shipra Chakraborty Banerjee

Manik Bandyopadhyay [alias Banerjee] (Manik Bandyopadhyay; 19 May 1908 – 3 December 1956) was an Indian author regarded as one of the major figures of 20th century Bengali literature. His birth name was Prabodhkumar Bandyopadhyay. During the 28 years of his literary career, battling with epilepsy from the age of around 28 and financial strains all along, he produced some masterpieces of novels and short stories, as well as poems and essays. One of the early neo-realist film shot in Pakistan, The Day Shall Dawn, is based on his story.

== Early life ==
Manik was born on 19 May 1908 in Dumka, a small town of Santhal Parganas district in the state of the then Bihar (now under Jharkhand) in British India in a Bengali Brahmin family of Harihar Bandyopadhyay and Niroda Devi. He was named Prabodh Kumar, but was known mostly by his nickname Manik. His parents had fourteen children (ultimately ten survived) and Manik was fourth of the six sons with all four elder sisters. His family had its ancestral home in Malapadiya village of Bikrampur in Dacca district (present day Bangladesh). His father, who joined in government service as surveyor and finally retired as sub-deputy collector, had to work in different parts of undivided Bengal like Calcutta, Midnapore, Barasat, Dacca, Dumka, Cumilla, Brahmanbaria, Mymensingh, Tangail and in some parts of Orissa and Bihar. This gave Manik an opportunity to experience the misery and sorrows of the rural and urban people as growing up, which was reflected sympathetically in his works throughout. Romantic in nature, Manik could sing well and play flutes from early in his life almost till death. They had a total of 14 siblings, Manik was the fifth child among them.

== Literary life ==
Manik was much inclined to literature and had read some Bengali masterpieces at an early age. While in Class VII in Bindubasini School at Tangail, the Bengali teacher would be pleased with Manik's way of writing essays and would often advise classmates to follow him. Manik wrote poetry at the age of sixteen. A brilliant student, Manik studied in the prestigious Presidency College in Calcutta (now Kolkata) with Bachelor of Science (B.Sc.) Honors course in mathematics. One day, some classmates argued that leading periodicals publish stories only of eminent authors. Manik differed and took the challenge with a bet and replied that his first story would be good enough for the purpose. He wrote his first story "Atasimami" (Aunt Atasi), a romantic love story based on his early life experience of an older couple, a clarionet player and his wife, and went straight to the office of the then renowned monthly Bichitra. Manik handed over the story to the deputy editor present there without even asking when to come next to know the fate of the story. After anxiously waiting for around four months, one fine morning, the famous writer and editor of the monthly himself came to his home with a copy of Poush 1335 issue (Dec-Jan 1928–29) and honorarium and requested for another story. "Atasimami" created sensation in the literary circle of Bengal and Manik became casual in his studies and could not succeed twice in B.Sc. final terms and devoted himself wholeheartedly to literature.

== Social and political views ==
Manik Bandyopadhyay carefully read Freud, Marx, Engels, Lenin, Stalin and socialist philosophers and participated in cultural activities and mass movements of the toiling people. He finally joined the Communist Party of India in 1944 and remained a member until his death.

== Works ==
In 28 years of literary career, he wrote 38 novels, 306 short stories (includes 32 juvenile stories), one book of drama, one book of poems and one book of essays on literature.

Manik wrote his first novel Dibaratrir Kavya (Poetry of the Day and Night) at the age of 21. His notable novels include first published one, Janani (Mother), 1935, Dibaratrir Kavya, 1935, Putul Nacher Itikatha (The Puppets' Tale), 1936, Padma Nadir Majhi (Boatman of the River Padma), 1936, Shahartoli (Suburbia in 2 vols.), 1940, 1941, Chatushkone (Quadrangle), 1942, Chinha (Signs), 1947, and Halud Nadi Sabuj Bon (Yellow River Green Forest), 1956.

Manik had 16 books of short stories published during his lifetime. Some of his famous stories include: "Sailaja Shila" ("Rocky Rocks"), "Pragoitihasik" ("Primeval"), "Sarishrip" ("Reptiles"), "Atmahatyar Adhikar" ("Right to Suicide"), "Haludpora" ("Burnt Turmeric"), "Namuna" ("A Sample"), "Aaj Kal Porshur Galpo" ("Today, Tomorrow and Day After"), "Shilpi" ("Craftsman"), "Haraner Natjamai" ("Haran's Grandson-in-Law"), "Chhotobokulpurer Jatri" ("Travelers to Chhotobokulpur"), "Upay" ("The Way-out").

His two other works (edited) are Manik Bandyopadhyayer Kavita (Poems of Manik Bandyopadhyay), 1970, edited by Jugantar Chakravarty, and Samagra Prabandha Ebong (Complete Essays), 2015, edited by Subhamoy Mandal and Sukanta Bandyopadhyay.

=== Adaptations ===
Drama

- vitamati(1946)

==== Movies ====
- The Day Shall Dawn 1959, Pakistani movie shot in East Pakistan
- Dibratrir Kabya 1970, Indian film
- Calcutta 71 (1972)
- Chhoto Bakulpurer Jatri (1987)
- Jake Ghoosh Dite Hoy
- Padma Nadir Majhi (1992)
- Sarisreep (1987)
- Shilpi (1994)
- Mayar Jonjal (2023)
- Putul Nacher Itikatha (2025)

=== Translations ===
Manik Bandyopadhyay (Banerjee) 's works have been translated into Indian, English, and other languages abroad. His novel Padma Nadir Majhi (Boatman of The Padma) has been translated into 7/8 Indian languages, thrice in English and in Swedish, Czech, Hungarian, Chinese, Bulgarian, Russian, Slovak, Dutch, German, French, and latest into Italian in 2014. Other distinctive novel Putul Nacher Itikatha (The Puppets' Tale) has translations into 11/12 Indian languages and in English, Czech and in Hungarian language. The novel Chinnha (Signs) is translated into Assamese (Indian, 2006), English (2021), and into Czech language (1956). Another novel Darpan (Mirror) was translated into Hindi in 1986. Besides, two other novels have also been translated into two Indian languages, English and into Czech language.

Following are the five books of translation of Manik Bandyopadhyay's stories:

- Primeval And Other Stories, People's Publishing House, New Delhi, 1958. 11 stories by 9 translators – edited by Debiprasad Chattopadhyaya with an introduction by Atulchandra Gupta.
- Selected Stories: Manik Bandyopadhyay, THEMA, Kolkata, 1988. 16 stories by 13 translators, Introduced and edited by Malini Bhattacharya with a translation.
- Wives & Others, Penguin Books India (P) Ltd., New Delhi, 1994. 24 stories and a novel (Amritasya Putra) – translated with elaborate introduction by Kalpana Bardhan.
- Opium A Jiné Povídky (Opium & Other Short Stories) [in Czech language], Svobodné Slovo – Melantrich, Prague, Czechoslovakia, 1956. 16 stories with a novel Chinha (Signs) – translated by Ajit Majumder.
- Selected Short Stories, Shan Shi Peoples' Publishing House, Taiyuan, China, 1984. 14 stories translated by Mrs. Srieve Chen.

Nearly 70 short stories of Manik Bandyopadhyay are known to have been translated into Indian and international languages.

== See also ==
- Syed Mustafa Siraj
