= Kallol =

Literary movement in Bengali literature

Kallol (Bengali: কল্লোল) refers to one of the most influential literary movements in Bengali literature, which can be placed approximately between 1923 and 1935. The name Kallol of the Kallol group derives from a magazine of the same name (which translates as 'the sound of waves' in Bengali). Kallol was the main mouthpiece for a group of young writers starting their careers around that time including Premendra Mitra, Kazi Nazrul Islam, and Buddhadeb Basu. A number of other magazines that followed Kallol can also be placed as part of the general movement. These include Uttara (1925), Pragati (1926), Kalikolom (1926), and Purbasha (1932).

== History ==
In 1921, Gokulchandra Nag, Dineshranjan Das, Sunita Debi, and Manindralal Basu set up the "Four Arts Club" at Hazra Road in Kolkata to discuss and practice literature, painting, music, and drama. The four members published an anthology of short stories in 1922 named Jhorer Dola (lit. 'The Sway of the Storm').

The Four Arts Club did not last, but Dineshranjan Das and Gokulchandra Nag established a magazine and a literary circle in 1923, which they named Kallol. The regular adda, or literary discussion, would be held at Dineshranjan's house at Patuatola Lane, Kolkata. The magazine folded in 1935.

== Influence ==
The Kallol circle was perhaps the first conscious literary movement to embrace modernism in Bengali literature. However, the general literary atmosphere was not entirely receptive of such a radical break from the critically and popularly acclaimed humanism of Tagore. Another major literary establishment of the day, Shanibarer Chithi, began a famous literary feud with the young Kallol members which lasted for years. Tagore himself joined the debate and published an essay in Kallol where he mentioned that he appreciated the literary effort, but found that the demand for realistic literature was just "the flaunting of poverty" combined with the "unrestraint of lust". He described the literary squabbles of the day in Shesher Kabita, where the protagonist Amit Ray is a modernist who abhors Tagore's humanism but espouses it later. The Kallol members, on the other hand, heavily influenced by Sigmund Freud and Karl Marx, did not deny that they loathed an idealist's version of a "higher" individual. The discussions of the Kallol circle provided ideas for many of the progressive writers of the age.

Perhaps, one of the greatest achievements of the Kallol group was in establishing a new generation of writers and thinkers in Bengal. When writing for Kallol, Kazi Nazrul Islam was only twenty-five, Premendra Mitra under twenty, and Buddhadeb Basu fifteen. Nazrul would establish a rebellious streak in Bengali poetry, Mitra, a Chekhovian grasp of the short story and Basu would inspire a generation of poets with his little magazine group Kabita.
