= List of Indian Bengali films of 2013 =

This is a list of films produced by the Tollywood (Indian Bengali language film industry) based in Kolkata in 2013.

== January–March ==
Opening		Title	Director	Cast	Genre
J A N U A R Y	4	Maach Mishti & More	Mainak Bhaumik	Soumitra Chatterjee, Parambrata Chattopadhyay, Raima Sen, Swastika Mukherjee, Parno Mittra, Anubrata Basu	Comedy, drama
J A N U A R Y	4	Misti Cheler Dustu Buddhi	Partha Sarathi Manna	Abhishek Chatterjee, Bhola Tamang, Prasun Gain, Master Ankit Seth, Raju Majumder, Indranil Sen, Nupur	Children
J A N U A R Y	11	Honeymoon	Arup Bhanja	Arav, Vikram, Soumitra Chatterjee, Sagar, Rupa Bhattacharya, Biplab Ghosh, Sangeeta Nandi	Drama, romance
J A N U A R Y	11	Target Kolkata	Kartick Singh	Rishi, Bidita Bag, Subrata Dutta, Suparna Malakar, Sreela Majumdar, Suhasini Mulay, Bodhisattwa Majumdar, Prasun Gain, Jagannath Guha, Arindam Sil	Drama, action
J A N U A R Y	18	Deewana	Rabi Kinagi	Jeet, Srabanti, Bharat Kaul, Biswajit Chakraborty, Supriyo Dutta, Tulika Basu, Mausumi Das	Romance
J A N U A R Y	18	Shunyo Awnko	Goutam Ghose	Soumitra Chatterjee, Konkona Sen Sharma, Priyanshu Chatterjee, Lolita Chatterjee, Priyanka Bose	Drama
J A N U A R Y	18	Kagojer Nouka	Parthasarathi Joardar	Soumitra Chatterjee, Victor Banerjee, Rajesh Sharma, Bidita Bag, Priyam, Kritika Mitra, Anusuya Majumdar	Drama
J A N U A R Y	25	Black Mail	Surya Saha	Rohan, Arunima Ghosh, Nimisha Dey Sarkar	Drama
J A N U A R Y	25	Ajana Dweep	Prasun Banerjee		Drama
F E B R U A R Y	1	The Light: Swami Vivekananda	Utpal (Tutu) Sinha	Deep Bhattacharya, Gargi Roy Choudhury, Premankur Chattopadhyay, Courtney Stephens Brook, Biswajit Chakraborty, Piyali Mitra	Drama
F E B R U A R Y	1	Porir Swapno	Shyamal Bose		Drama
F E B R U A R Y	8	Namte Namte	Rana Basu	Roopa Ganguly, Saswata Chatterjee, Rajatava Dutta, Bhaswar Chattopadhyay	Drama
F E B R U A R Y	8	Golemale Pirit Koro Na	Anindya Banerjee	Jisshu Sengupta, Payel Sarkar, Ritwik Chakraborty, Sumita, Kanchan Mullick	Comedy
F E B R U A R Y	14	Simanaheen	Kevin Dalvi, Ria Mahtab	Rahsaan Noor, Ismat	Romance
F E B R U A R Y	15	Loveria	Raja Chanda	Soham Chakraborty, Pooja Bose, Rajatava Dutta	Romance
F E B R U A R Y	15	Megh Roddur	Surajit Dhar, Sudarshan Basu	Subhashree Ganguly, Palash Ganguly, Kumar, Debolina Dutta, Rupsa, Biplab Dasgupta, Biswajit Chakraborty, Anindya Banerjee, Bishwanath Basu, Parthasarathi Chakraborty	Romance
F E B R U A R Y	15	Aajker Sangsar	Srikanta Ghosh		Action, drama
F E B R U A R Y	22	Bicycle Kick	Debashis Sen Sharma, Sumit Das	Sourav Bandyopadhyay, Ritwick Chakraborty, Ridhima Ghosh	Drama, romance
F E B R U A R Y	22	Rupe Tomay Bholabo Na	Raj Mukherjee	Swastika Mukherjee, Soumitra Chatterjee, Kaushik Sen, Shaan Roy, Ananya Sarkar	Romance, drama
F E B R U A R Y	22	Damadol	Manoj Michigan	Saswata Chatterjee, Saheb Bhattacharya, Ritabhari Chakraborty, Samadarshi Dutta, Anindita Banerjee, Rajdeep Gupta, Gunjan	Comedy
M A R C H	1	From Headquarters	Debabrata Roy	Abhishek Chatterjee, Locket Chatterjee, Chandan Sen, Anindya Banerjee, Sourav	Drama
M A R C H	1	Aborto	Arindam Sil	Joya Ahsan, Tota Roy Chowdhury, Reshmi Ghosh, Abir Chatterjee, Kaushik Ganguly, Saswata Chatterjee, Ritwick Chakraborty, Barun Chanda, Locket Chatterjee, Biplab Chatterjee, Saswati Guha Thakurata, Pallabi Chatterjee, Puja Gupta, Devang Gandhi, Sambaran Banerjee, Ranadeb Bose, Arindam Sil	Drama
M A R C H	1	Final Mission	Sudipto Sengupta	Ferdous Ahmed, Rimjhim Mitra, Shankar Chakraborty, Raja Chattopadhyay, Shyamal Dutta, Irani Mukherjee, Rajat Ganguly, Bhola Tamang, Sanjay Banerjee	Drama
M A R C H	1	Antardaho	Sushanta Pal Choudhury	Jisshu Sengupta, Rimjhim Gupta, Sabitri Chatterjee, Anuradha Ray, Gourishankar Panda, Parthasarathi Deb, Soumitra Chatterjee, Jnanesh Mukherjee, Pratim Chatterjee	Drama
M A R C H	8	Kidnapper	Rupak Majumdar	Samadarshi Dutta, Ridhima Ghosh, Paran Bandopadhyay, Biswajit Chakraborty, Sourav Chatterjee, Apurbo Roy, Shantilal Mukherjee, Sumit Samaddar	Drama
M A R C H	15	Kanamachi	Raj Chakraborty	Ankush Hazra, Abir Chatterjee, Srabanti Chatterjee, Sayani Ghosh, Rajatava Dutta, Aritra Dutta Banik	Romance, action
M A R C H	15	Panga Nibi Na Sala	Prince	Arko, Neha, Asish Samal, Anamika Saha, Debraj Ray, Ramen Roychowdhury, Sumit Gangopadhyay, Bhola Tamang	Drama
M A R C H	22	Chhayamoy	Haranath Chakrabarty	Gaurav Chakrabarty, Sabyasachi Chakrabarty, Paran Bandopadhyay, Deepankar De	Fantasy drama
M A R C H	22	Hawa Bodol	Parambrata Chatterjee	Parambrata Chatterjee, Raima Sen, Rudranil Ghosh	Comedy
M A R C H	29	Basanta Utsav	Ritabrata Bhattacharya	Parambrata Chatterjee, Rudranil Ghosh, Swastika Mukherjee	Drama
M A R C H	29	Amar Bodyguard	Haranath Chakraborty	Ridhima Ghosh, Pratik	Drama

== April–June ==
Opening		Title	Director	Cast	Genre	Ref.
A P R I L	1	Shunyo	Rudranil Ghosh	Anjan Dutt, Rudrani Ghosh	Mystery	
A P R I L	5	Jigyasa	Subharanjan Roy	Mrinal Mukherjee, Sumit Samaddar, Arnab Banerjee, Debaparna Chakraborty	Crime, drama	
A P R I L	12	Goynar Baksho	Aparna Sen	Moushumi Chatterjee, Konkona Sen Sharma, Srabanti Chatterjee, Saswata Chatterjee, Ranjit Mallick, Gargi Roychowdhury, Pijush Ganguly, Manasi Sinha	Drama	
A P R I L	12	Shabdo	Kaushik Ganguly	Ritwick Chakraborty, Raima Sen, Churni Ganguly, Victor Banerjee, Srijit Mukherji	Social	
A P R I L	12	Holud Pakhir Dana	Kanoj Das	Dibyendu Mukherjee, Rimjhim Gupta, Sabyasachi Chakraborty, Anuradha Ray, Kalyani Mondal, Ramen Raychowdhury, Monu Mukhopadhyay, Nimai Ghosh, Bidyut Das, Sangeeta Sanyal	Drama	
A P R I L	19	Dekha, Na-Dekhay	Arnab Ghoshal	Samadarshi Dutta, Debosmita Saha, Laboni Sarkar, Manoj Mitra, Prasun Gayen, Koushik Bandyopadhyay, Mrinal Mukherjee, Pradip Chakraborty	Drama	
A P R I L	26	Rocky	Sujit Mondal	Mahaakshay Chakraborty, Pooja Bose, Mithun Chakraborty, Somnath Panja, Bharat Kaul	Action	
A P R I L	26	Chupi Chupi	Abir Bose	Ritojit, Priyanka Halder, Laboni Sarkar, Koushik Bandyopadhyay, Kharaj Mukherjee, Manasi Sinha	Romance	
M A Y	3	Baro Eka Lage	Gobinda Sil	Hiran Chatterjee, Tuya, Srabanti Bhattacharya, Manasi Sinha, Mousumi Saha, Bodhisattva Majumdar, Papia Debrajan	Drama	
M A Y	3	Arjun: Kalimpong E Sitaharan	Prem Modi	Om, Sabyasachi Chakraborty, Dipankar De, Manoj Mitra, Churni Ganguly, Biswajit Chakraborty,	Detective	
M A Y	3	Lattu	Asish Ro	Sabyasachi Chakraborty, Debashree Roy, Subrat Dutt, Megha Burman, Biswajit Chakraborty, Kharaj Mukherjee, Partha Sarathi Deb	Drama	
M A Y	10	Ami Aar Amar Girlfriends	Mainak Bhaumik	Swastika Mukherjee, Raima Sen, Parno Mittra	Drama	
M A Y	17	Mahapurush O Kapurush	Aniket Chattopadhyay	Bratya Basu, Dipankar De, Locket Chatterjee, Bhola Tamang, Tanima Sen, Ritwick Chakraborty, Biswanath Basu, Sujoy Prosad Chatterjee, Lama Haldar	Comedy	
M A Y	17	Classmate	Asish Roy	Aksat, Sagar, Prantik, Jhilik, Sankalita, Anuradha Ray, Bodhisattwa Majumdar, Biswajit Chakraborty, Arpita Becker, Kharaj Mukherjee, Joyjit Banerjee, Shakti Dey, Tanima Sen	Romance, drama	
M A Y	17	E Juger Bhalobasha	Rishi Debasish	Dipankar De, Mainak Banerjea, Jasmine Chatterjee, Mrinal Mukherjee, Dulal Lahiri, Anamika	Romance, drama	
M A Y	17	Blackmail	Surjo Saha	Rohaan Bhattarcharjee, Arunima Ghosh, Nimisha, Tirthankar Roy, Rajatava Dutta	Romance, drama	
M A Y	17	Har Mana Har	Kankan Bhattacharya	Som Roy Chowdhury, Priyanka Haldar, Trisha, Debanshu Roy, Debjani Banerjee, Debosmita, Barsha, Rituparna Sengupta, Deepankar De, Soma Chakraborty, Kharaj Mukherjee, Biswajit Chakraborty, Arun Mukhopadhyay, Raju Thakkar	Romance, drama	
M A Y	24	Sweetheart	Prodip Saha	Indraneil Sengupta, Paoli Dam, Tapas Paul, Santu Mukhopadhyay, Rajatava Dutta, Satabdi Roy, Raja Chattopadhyay	Romance, drama	
M A Y	24	Goyenda Gogol	Arindam Dey	Arijit Ghosh, Indraneil Sengupta, Rachana Banerjee, Ankita, Mosumi, Saheb Chatterjee, Debdut Ghosh	Detective	
M A Y	31	Adbhoot	Sayantan Mukherjee	Soumitra Chatterjee, Biswanath Basu, Anjana Basu, Subhasish Mukherjee, Paran Bandyopadhyay, Kharaj Mukherjee, Sankar Chakraborty	Comedy	
M A Y	31	Mistake	S. K.	Vikram Chatterjee, Preeti Jhangiani, Sourav Chatterjee, Malabika, Dulal Lahiri, Biswajit Chakraborty, Kunal Padhi	Romance, drama	
J U N E	7	Mrs. Sen	Agnidev Chatterjee	Rituparna Sengupta, Hrishitaa Bhatt, Rohit Roy, Biplab Chatterjee, Anushua Majumdar, Subhasish Mukherjee, Shankar Chakraborty, Priyangshu Chowdhury, Rupsha Guha, Usashi Chakraborty	Drama	
J U N E	7	Prem Juddho	Apurba Banerjee	Sudip Mukherjee, Pallavi Chatterjee, Vishal, Shampa, Shankar Chakraborty, Arjun Chakraborty, Premjit, Krishno Kishore Mukherjee, Amitava Bhattacharya	Drama	
J U N E	14	Meghe Dhaka Tara	Kamaleswar Mukherjee	Saswata Chatterjee, Ananya Chatterjee, Abir Chatterjee, Rahul, Joydeep Mukherjee, Abhijit Guha, Ritwik Chakrabarty, Anindya Bose, Mumtaz Sorcar, Bidipta Chakrabarty, Subhasish Mukhopadhyay, Biswajit Chakraborty, Debpratim Dasgupta	Drama	
J U N E	14	Oh! Henry	Animesh Roy	Locket Chatterjee, Dibyendu Mukherjee, Pooja Bose	Suspense, thriller	
J U N E	14	Khoka 420	Rajib Biswas	Dev, Subhashree Ganguly, Nusrat Jahan, Tapas Paul, Rajatava Dutta	Romance	
J U N E	21	Ganesh Talkies	Anjan Dutt	Chandan Roy Sanyal, Raima Sen, Rajesh Sharma, Biswajit Chakraborty, Konineeca Bannerjee, Taranga Sarkar, Pallavi Chatterjee, Rita Koiral	Romance, comedy	
J U N E	28	C/O Sir	Kaushik Ganguly	Saswata Chatterjee, Raima Sen, Sabyasachi Chakraborty, Indraneil Sengupta, Sudipta Chakraborty	Drama	

== July–September ==
Opening		Title	Director	Cast	Genre	Ref.
J U L Y	5	A Political Murder	Agnidev Chatterjee	Rituparna Sengupta, Rahul Banerjee, Priyanka Sarkar	Thriller	
J U L Y	12	Hoi Choi	Debarati Gupta	Rahul Banerjee, Priyanka Sarkar, Paoli Dam, Vikram Chatterjee, Sekhar Das	Drama	
J U L Y	12	Nodi Re Tui	Kingshuk Dey	Soumitra Chatterjee, Abhiraj, Moubani Sorcar, Ashoke Viswanathan	Drama	
J U L Y	19	Alik Sukh	Nandita Roy & Shiboprosad Mukherjee	Rituparna Sengupta, Sohini Sengupta, Soumitra Chatterjee, Debshankar Haldar, Kharaj Mukherjee	Drama	
J U L Y	21	Porichoi	Rupali Guha	Prosenjit Chatterjee, Mishti	Drama	
J U L Y	26	Half Serious	Utsav Mukherjee	Roopa Ganguly, Silajit Majumder, Saheb Bhattacharya, Mumtaz Sorcar, Ridhima Ghosh, Sudipta Chakraborty.	Comedy, drama	
J U L Y	26	Ek Fota Bhaalobasha	Angshuman Pratyush	Indraneil Sengupta, Tathoi, Rajesh Sharma	Romance, drama	
A U G U S T	2	Kangal Malsat	Suman Mukhopadhyay	Kaushik Ganguly, Kabir Suman, Kamalika, Dibyendu	Drama, political	
A U G U S T	9	Proloy	Raj Chakraborty	Parambrata Chatterjee, Mimi Chakraborty, Rudranil Ghosh, Saswata Chatterjee, Paran Bandopadhyay	Drama	
A U G U S T	9	Boss	Baba Yadav	Jeet, Subhashree Ganguly	Action, Romance	
A U G U S T	23	Bangla Naache Bhangra	Nandini	Sayan, Pallabi	Romance	
A U G U S T	23	Tasher Desh	Qaushiq Mukherjee	Tillotama Shome, Imaad Shah, Anubrata Basu, Rii Sen, Maya Tideman, Soumyak Kanti De Biswas, Joyraj Bhattacharjee, Tinu Verghese	Fantasy, musical	
S E P T E M B E R	6	Rupkatha Noy	Atanu Ghosh	Soumitra Chatterjee, Radhika Apte, Gaurav Chakrabarty, Kaushik Sen, Indraneil Sengupta, Arindam Sil, Rahul Banerjee		
S E P T E M B E R	6	Satyanweshi	Rituparno Ghosh	Sujoy Ghosh, Anindya Chatterjee, Arpita Pal, Indraneil Sengupta		
S E P T E M B E R	6	Promotion	Snehasish Chakraborty	Paoli Dam, Indraneil Sengupta, Mamata Shankar, Abhishek Chatterjee, Subhasish Mukhopadhyay, Kanchan Mullick, Milind Gunaji		
S E P T E M B E R	13	Encounter	Suman Mukhopadhyay	Ferdous Ahmed, Rajesh Sharma, Shantilal Mukherjee, Biswajit Chakraborty	Action, thriller	
S E P T E M B E R	13	Kaal Madhumas	Prabir Roy	Arindam Sil, Sudip Sarkar, Rimjhim Gupta, Saptarshi Ray, Ranjini Chatterjee		
S E P T E M B E R	13	Swabhoomi	Ujjwal Chatterjee	Jackie Shroff, Tapas Paul, Debashree Roy		
S E P T E M B E R	20	Tiyasha	Animesh Roy	Saswata Chatterjee, Chandrayee Ghosh, Soham Basu Roychowdhury	Romance, drama	
S E P T E M B E R	20	Bakita Byaktigato	Pradipta Bhattacharya	Ritwick Chakraborty, Aparajita Ghosh Das, Madhabi Mukherjee, Debesh Raychowdhury, Supriyo Dutta, Churni Ganguly, Monu Mukherjee, Sudipa Basu	Drama	
S E P T E M B E R	20	Shantiniketaney	Ashok Biswanathan	Roopa Ganguly, Neel Mukherjee, Victor Banerjee, Rajesh Sharma, Shruti Bandyopadhyay, Paoli Dam	Drama	
S E P T E M B E R	20	Aaleyar Aalo	Debabrata Mukhopadhyay	Satabdi Roy, Madhabi Mukherjee, Minakshi Goswami, Shantilal Mukherjee, Rajatava Dutta, Biswajit Chakraborty	Drama	
S E P T E M B E R	27	Phoring	Indranil Raychowdhury	Sohini Sarkar, Ritwick Chakraborty, Dwijen Bandyopadhyay, Shankar Debnath, Senjuti Roy Mukherjee, Akash	Drama	
S E P T E M B E R	27	Nayika Sangbad	Bappaditya Bandopadhyay	Indraneil Sengupta, Arunima Ghosh, Mumtaz Sorcar	Drama	
S E P T E M B E R	27	Strugglers: The Reality Behind	Anil Bajoria, Balai Biswas	Kamalika, Juhi Sengupta, Vishal, Meghna Halder	Horror	
S E P T E M B E R	27	Ami Aaj Nasto Hoye Jai	Srikanta	Piyali, Swaraj, Anamika Saha, Mrinal Mukherjee, Bodhisatya Majumder	Drama	

== October–December ==
Opening		Title	Director	Cast	Genre	Ref.
O C T O B E R	4	Khomaprarthi	Sanddy	Saikat Das, Payel, Saniya, Sanat Das, Sahil Hassan, Madhu Mitra Ghosh, Shome Mitra, Amit Sengupta, Mantu, Soumen Shil	Drama	
O C T O B E R	4	Mukti	Reshmi Mitra	Rituparna Sengupta, Rajdeep Gupta, Monami Ghosh, Silajit Majumder, Sreela Majumdar	Drama	
O C T O B E R	5	Villain	Tota Roy Chowdhury	Tota Roy Chowdhury, Rituparna Sengupta	Drama	
O C T O B E R	11	Rangbaaz	Raja Chanda	Dev, Koel Mallick, Rajatava Dutta	Action	
O C T O B E R	11	Mishawr Rawhoshyo	Srijit Mukherji	Prosenjit Chatterjee, Indraneil Sengupta, Swastika Mukherjee, Kamaleshwar Mukherjee, Devdaan Bhowmik, Rajit Kapur, Barun Chanda, Neel Mukherjee, Rajesh Sharma	Adventure, Thriller	
O C T O B E R	11	Khiladi	Ashok Pati	Ankush Hazra, Nusrat Jahan, Rajatava Dutta, Laboni Sarkar, Tapas Paul, Kharaj Mukherjee, Kanchan Mullick	Drama, romance, action	
O C T O B E R	25	Anya Na	Parthasarathi Joarddar	Nigel Akkara, Ananya Chatterjee, Krishnakishore Mukherjee, Ratna Ghoshal, Koneenica Banerjee, Arijit Guha	Drama	
O C T O B E R	25	Aashbo Aar Ek Din	Abhijit Dasgupta	Abir Chatterjee, Swastika Mukherjee, Roopa Ganguly, Ridhima Ghosh, Gaurav Chakrabarty, Arindam Sil	Drama	
N O V E M B E R	10	Sunglass	Rituparno Ghosh	Tota Roy Chowdhury, Konkona Sen Sharma	Comedy, Thriller	
N O V E M B E R	15	Ashchorjyo Prodeep	Anik Dutta	Saswata Chatterjee, Sreelekha Mitra	Fantasy	
D E C E M B E R	6	Hanuman.com	Gaurabh Pandey	Prosenjit Chatterjee, Mousumi Bhattacharya	Thriller	
D E C E M B E R	6	The Play	Ranjay Ray Choudhury	Indrasish Roy, Mumtaz Sorcar	Thriller	
D E C E M B E R	20	Chander Pahar	Kamaleshwar Mukherjee	Dev, Gerard Rudolf	Action, adventure	
D E C E M B E R	27	Sudhu Tomari	Rajkumar Patra	Rajkumar Patra, Priyanka Shah	Romantic, Drama	
