= Prodyut Mukherjee =

Indian Tabla Player

Prodyut Mukherjee (Bengali: প্রদ্যুত মুখার্জি), born on 5 June 1975, is a tabla (Indian percussion) player. He was awarded the Global India Music Academy Award (GiMA Award) in 2016 for his album Rhythm Express-Moods with Padma Bhushan Pt. Vishwa Mohan Bhatt. Prodyut is a composer, soloist, fusion, and classical musician, with a wide range of musical albums to his credit. Prodyut Mukherjee is known for Roshni Ho Sarhadon Mein (2022).

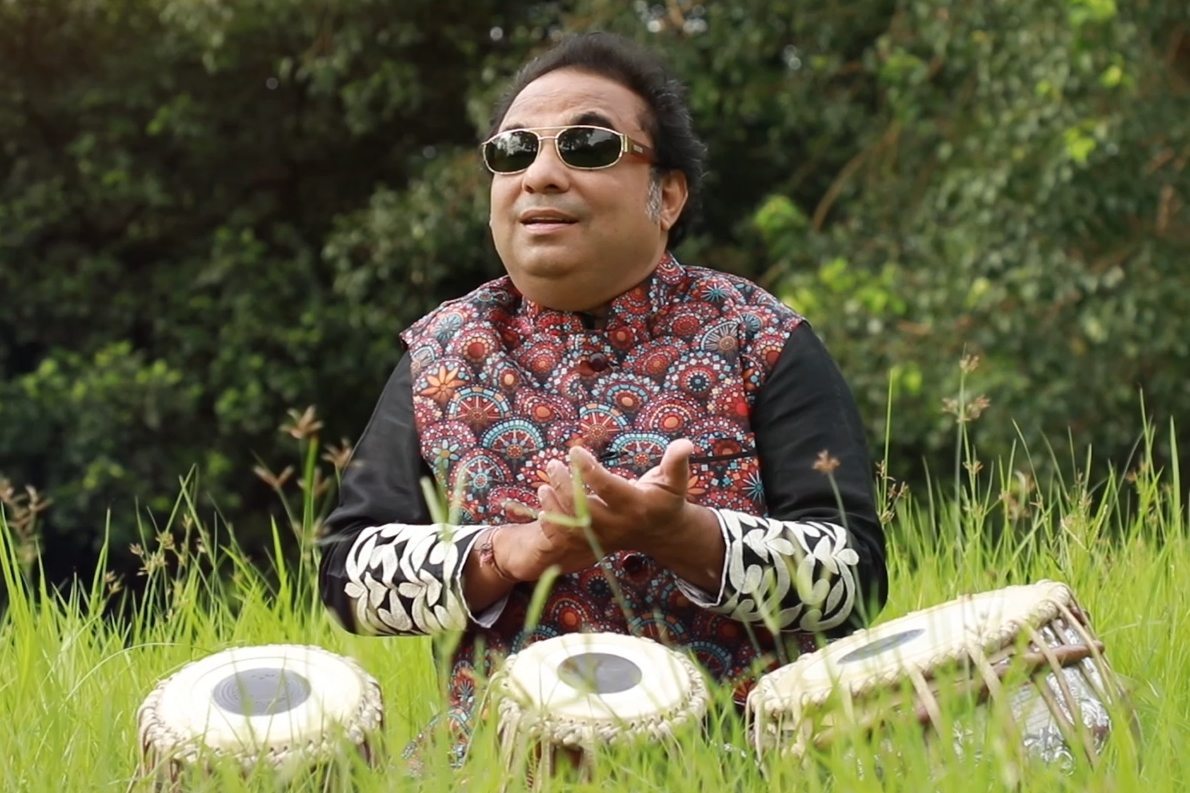
Pandit Prodyut Mukherjee

== Music ==
The Rhythm Express set-up is Prodyut Mukherjee's contribution towards a new form of fusion with depth and soul. Rhythm Express, encompasses a vast spectrum of musical genres, ranging from traditional Hindustani classical to South Indian classical notes and extending beyond the boundaries of India.

Mukherjee uses his tabla & chic drum (mouth percussion) to simulate the sound of thunderstorms, rain drops, movement of two trains on side by side track, the noise made by the hooves of horses on the move, Shiva Tandava and many more, aiming to evoke specific imagery.

== Performances ==
=== National Performances ===
- Hand-shake concert at Kohima Raj Bhawan and organized by NEZCC, Govt. of India.
- Jai Jawan (A musical tribute to the Indian Army). The musical program was held at Indian Museum Kolkata.
- Swami Haridas Sangeet Sammelan Kolkata in collaboration with EZCC, Ministry of Culture, Govt. of India.
- Airport Authority of India musical concert in collaboration with Spicmacay.
- Maha Shivratri concert at Kashi Vishwanath Temple Varanasi.
- Sankat Mochan Music Festival Varanasi.
- West Bengal State Academy Music Conference.
- Dover Lane Music Conference Kolkata.
- Uttarpara Sangeet Chakra Music Conference.
- Pandit Nikhil Banerjee Memorial Music Conference, Barrackpore, West Bengal.
- Swami Vivekananda Music Festival, The Ramakrishna Mission Institute of Culture, Golpark, Kolkata.
- Lal Mati Utsav(Gaan Mela), Mumbai.
- Banga Sanskriti Utsav, Mumbai.
- One World Fusion musical concert organised by Sangitanjaly Foundation in association with Telangana Tourism Department, Hyderabad.
- Music for World Peace concert supported by Kalyani Roy Memorial Trust and ICCR Kolkata.
- Pancham Beats, Musical Tribute to legendary R.D.Burman on his 80th birth anniversary at Calcutta Club, Kolkata.
- Spirit of Dance Festival, Delhi.
- Mountain Music Festival, The Dreamers, Sikkim.
- Bishnupur Utsav organised by Department of Tourism, Govt. of West Bengal.
- Rajarani Music Festival at Bhubaneswar, organised by Department of Tourism, Govt. Of Odhisha.
- Shani Sangeet Jayanti Festival at Indore.
- Spicmacay State Convention at Rourkela.
- 200 Foundation Day celebration of Hindu School, Kolkata. This event was inaugurated by the former president of India Late Pranab Mukherjee.
- Bharatiya Vidya Bhawan, Kochi.
- VIRASAT Festival by Spicmacay, National Institute of Technology Durgapur & MHRD, Govt. of India.

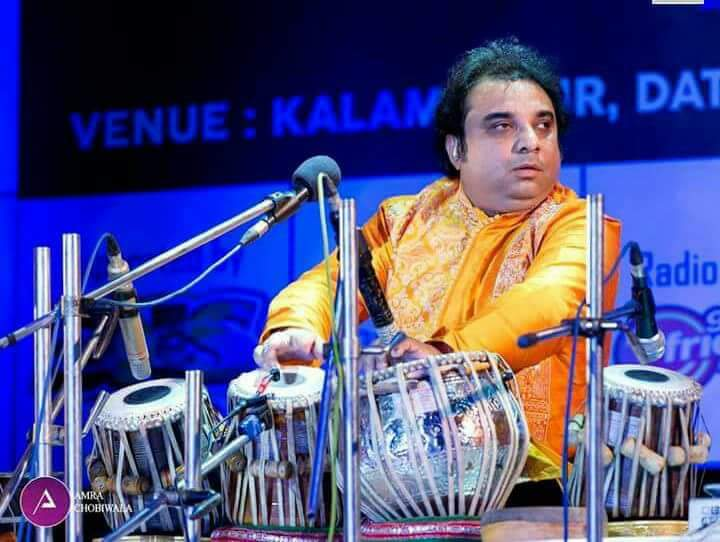
Maestro Prodyut Mukherjee Performing at Kalamandir Kolkata, 2017

=== International Performances ===
- Celebrate Nashville Cultural Festival, USA.
- Indian Cultural Center in Memphis, hosted by Sai Baba Temple Tennessee, USA.
- India Fest Milwaukee, USA.
- Tookhar Tamasha Art's music festival (JHOOM CANADA JHOOM) held in Mississauga, Ontario, Canada.
- Bharat Sevasharam, Toronto, Canada.
- China National Orchestra, National Centre for the Performing Arts, China.
- Fes Festival in the Medina, Morocco.
- World Music Concert, Paris.
- International Art Festival, London.

== Recognition ==
He was recognized by the former Indian cricket captain & current BCCI President Mr. Sourav Ganguly for his Rhythm Express Fusion project and Indian actor Mr. Anil Kapoor after receiving the GiMA award 2016 at Reliance Film City Mumbai. Mukherjee took part in the COVID-19 awareness program initiated by the Govt. of India(Ministry of Culture) for spreading positive harmonies among the people. This message was published on a social site maintained by Govt. of India.

He was conferred with the "Governor's Award of Excellence" in 2025 for contributions to Indian classical and fusion music, as well as his efforts in bringing Indian rhythms to the global stage.

== Awards ==
- GIMA AWARDS in the year 2016 for his album MOODS in collaboration with the legendary maestro Padma Shri & Padma Bhushan Pandit Vishwa Mohan Bhatt.
- Pandit Manmohan Bhatt Memorial Award in 2019 at Jaipur for outstanding contribution in the field of Indian classical music and fusion music.
- Governor's Award of Excellence by Governor of West Bengal at Raj Bhavan, Kolkata on 17 September 2025.

== Collaborators ==
- Pandit Vishwa Mohan Bhatt
- Dona Ganguly
- Anup Jalota
- Suresh Wadker
- Kishore Sodha
- Shaan

and other musicians around the world.
