= Nasto =

Nasto is a surname. Notable people with the name include:

== People with the surname ==
- Markelo Nasto, an Albanian football player
- Vangelis Nastos, a Greek football player
- Anestis Nastos, a Greek football player

== See also ==
- Ami Aaj Nasto Hoye Jai, a 2013 Bengali film
