= A Century Is Not Enough =

- Author: Sourav Ganguly
- Language: English
- Publisher: Juggernaut Books
- Publication place: India
- Pages: 296
- ISBN: 978-93-86228-56-7

A Century Is Not Enough: My Roller-coaster Ride to Success (2018) is an English autobiography written by former Indian cricketer and captain Sourav Ganguly with Gautam Bhattacharya. The book was first published by Juggernaut on 24 February 2018.

== Plot ==
In this book Ganguly discussed his cricketing career in details. He has discussed different phases of his cricketing career including several foreign tours, World Cups, and IPL.
