= Final Mission (2013 film) =

- Directed by: Sudipto Sengupta
- Screenplay by: Sudipto Sengupta
- Story by: Sudipto Sengupta; Gita Podder
- Based on: Family rivalry
- Starring: Ferdous Ahmed; Rimjhim Mitra; Shankar Chakraborty
- Cinematography: Sudipto Sengupta
- Edited by: Snehasish Ganguly
- Music by: Hriju Roy Chowdhury
- Distributed by: Calcutta Talkies
- Release date: 1 March 2013 (Kolkata)
- Country: India
- Language: Bengali

Final Mission is a 2013 Bengali film. The film was directed by Sudipto Sengupta and produced by Calcutta Talkies. Music of the film had been composed by Hriju Roy Chowdhury. The film was released on 1 March 2013.

== Plot ==
The film starts with the murder of an honest industrialist, Jayabrata Chakraborty (Rajat Ganguly), as the result of a terrible plan made by three criminals - Ranabir Hazra (Shyamal Dutta), Binod Pandey (Shankar Chakraborty), and Manmohan Sawant (Raja Chattopadhyay). Formerly, Jayabrata was a close friend of Ranabir Hazra. Their relationship was strengthened by an unassailable companionship. Apart from that, Jayabrata’s wife (Irani Mukherjee) shared an extremely sympathetic relationship with Ranabir’s wife, Jui (Santana Bose). However, the harmony between the two families got spoiled as the greedy and cruel thoughts of Ranabir Hazra came to the forefront, with fumes of retaliation harboured by Jui against her own husband. Jui had thought of a deadly mission of avenging her husband. As a demonstration of her canny strategy, Jui deploys her own son, Rana (Ferdous Ahmed) along with Jayabrata’s son, Raja (Sanjay Banerjee) in the ferocious dynamic encounter against her own husband Ranabir. Emboldened by the momentum of Jui, Rana initiated the courageous campaign of exercising penal measures against the three conspirers - Ranabir, Binod and Manmohan.

== Cast ==
- Ferdous Ahmed as Rana Hazra
- Shankar Chakraborty as Binod Pandey
- Rimjhim Mitra Sumana Pandey, daughter of Binod Pandey, Rana's love interest
- Raja Chattopadhyay as Manmohan Sawant
- Shyamal Dutta as Ranabir Hazra
- Santana Bose as Jui Hazra
- Rajat Ganguly as Jayabrata Chakraborty
- Irani Mukherjee as Malabika Chakraborty, wife of Jayabrata Chakraborty
- Sanjay Banerjee as Raja Chakraborty
- Bhola Tamang

== Soundtrack ==
Final Mission

Soundtrack album by Hriju Roy Chowdhury
- Released: 30 December 2012
- Genre: Feature film soundtrack
- Label: Sagarika
- Producer: Calcutta Talkies

The soundtrack of Final Mission is composed by Hriju Roy Chowdhury. The film has 7 original songs which are sung by single singers as well as in duets. The soundtrack was released on 30 December 2012.

Track listing
No.	Title	Lyrics	Singer(s)	Length
1.	"Ure Ure Bohudure"	Swarajit Banerjee	Abhijeet Bhattacharya, Rima Nathaniel	2:37
2.	"Ekhane Swapno Ore"	Swarajit Banerjee	Mahalakshmi Iyer, Sai Sandeep	3:27
3.	"Tumi Amar Sei Nandini"	Rajaram Chowdhury	Ravi Chakraborty	1:43
4.	"Chhai Hoye Ure Gelo"	Swarajit Banerjee	Udit Narayan	4:36
5.	"Shudhu Tumi Ei Sandhay"	Swarajit Banerjee	Mahalakshmi Iyer, Rima Nathaniel	2:29
6.	"Andho Samaje Tufaan Aante"	Rajaram Chowdhury	Javed Ali	2:43
Total length:				17:35

== Critical reception ==
Final Mission received average reviews from critics. The soundtrack was not well received. The acting of the cast was praised. As a whole, the director got compliments for his directorial debut.

Critics said, "Though Final Mission might seem to be the name of a 'war' film, it is neither a war film and is in fact a Bengali film. Well, it is a sort of a 'war' film, but not in the true sense. It is the war between different people and a war between members of the same family. Imagine a name like Final Mission being sort of a revenge tale." Another quote included: "The film is about a businessman, Jayabrata Chakrabarty who is murdered by three conniving men Ranabir Hazra, Binod Pandey and Manmohan Sawant. Out of them, Jayabrata’s family is very close to Ranabir’s family as their wives are very close. The relationship is spoilt - thanks to Ranabir Hazra who destroys the happiness of Jayabrata’s family."

== See also ==
- Aborto
