= List of presidents of the Cricket Association of Bengal =

President of Cricket Association of Bengal
- Incumbent; Sourav Ganguly since 22 September 2025
- Inaugural holder: H. G. Pearson
- Formation: 1928; 98 years ago

The president of the Cricket Association of Bengal is the highest post at the Cricket Association of Bengal (CAB). Sourav Ganguly is the current president of CAB.

== List ==
No.	Name	Took office	Left office	Remarks
1	H. G. Pearson	1928	1930	
2	F. M. Garnett	1931	1932	
3	R. B. Lagden	1932	1934	
4	J. H. Farquharson	1935	1935	
(3)	R. B. Lagden	1936	1939	
5	M. Robertson	1940	1941	
6	A. L. Hosie	1941	1941	
(5)	M. Robertson	1942	1942	
7	J. C. Mukherjee	1943	1949	
8	Bhupati Majumder	1950	1954	
9	Tushar Kanti Ghosh	1955	1963	Eminent Indian journalist
10	A. N. Ghosh	1963	1978	
11	S. K. Acharyya	1978	1981	
12	Siddhartha Shankar Ray	1982	1986	former Chief Minister of West Bengal (1972–1977)
13	B. N. Dutt	1986	1991	
14	Jagmohan Dalmiya	1992	2006	
15	Prasun Mukherjee	2006	2008	Police Commissioner of Kolkata (2004–2007)
(14)	Jagmohan Dalmiya	2008	2015	also served as BCCI President
16	Sourav Ganguly	2015	2019	
17	Avishek Dalmiya	2020	2022	
18	Snehasish Ganguly	2022	2025	
(16)	Sourav Ganguly	2025	Incumbent	former BCCI President

== See also ==
- Cricket Association of Bengal
- Bengal cricket team
- List of International Cricket Council presidents
- List of Board of Control for Cricket in India presidents
