= List of international cricket centuries by Sourav Ganguly =

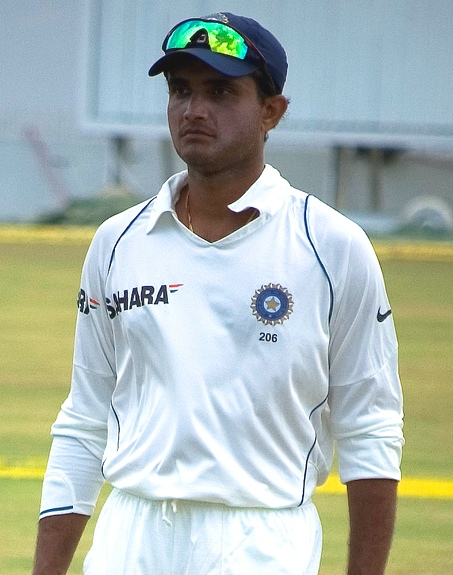
Sourav Ganguly scored 16 centuries in Test matches and 22 in ODIs.

Sourav Ganguly is a former Indian cricketer and captain of the India national cricket team. From his international debut in 1992 to his retirement in 2008, he scored centuries (100 or more runs) on 16 occasions in Test cricket and in 22 One Day International (ODI) matches.

Ganguly scored a century on Test debut, against England in Lord's in June 1996. He became the 10th Indian player to perform the feat, and the third player to score a century on debut at the ground. In the next match at Trent Bridge, he made 136 and became the third batsman to make a century in each of his first two innings. He is eighth in the list of leading Test century makers for India. His highest score of 239—his only double century—was made against Pakistan in 2007 at the M. Chinnaswamy Stadium, Bangalore. He made centuries against all Test-cricket playing nations except South Africa and West Indies. His centuries have been scored in fourteen cricket grounds, including eight outside India. He ended up in the nineties on four occasions—including two scores of 99.

In ODIs, Ganguly scored centuries against ten opponents—against all the cricketing nations that have permanent One Day International status except the West Indies. His first ODI century came against Sri Lanka at the R. Premadasa Stadium, Colombo in August 1997. He made his highest score in the format when he scored 183 against the same team during the 1999 World Cup. As of January 2019, he is joint-eighth in the list of leading century makers in ODIs. (Note: He is tied with Tillakaratne Dilshan, and is behind Virat Kohli (55); Sachin Tendulkar (49); Rohit Sharma (35); Ricky Ponting (30); Sanath Jayasuriya (28); Hashim Amla (27); and Kumar Sangakkara, AB de Villiers and Chris Gayle (25 each).) Along with Shikhar Dhawan, Herschelle Gibbs, and Chris Gayle, Ganguly holds the record for the most centuries in the ICC Champions Trophy, with three. Four out of his 22 centuries were scored at home grounds and eighteen were at away (opposition's home) or neutral venues. He was dismissed six times between 90 and 100.

== Key ==
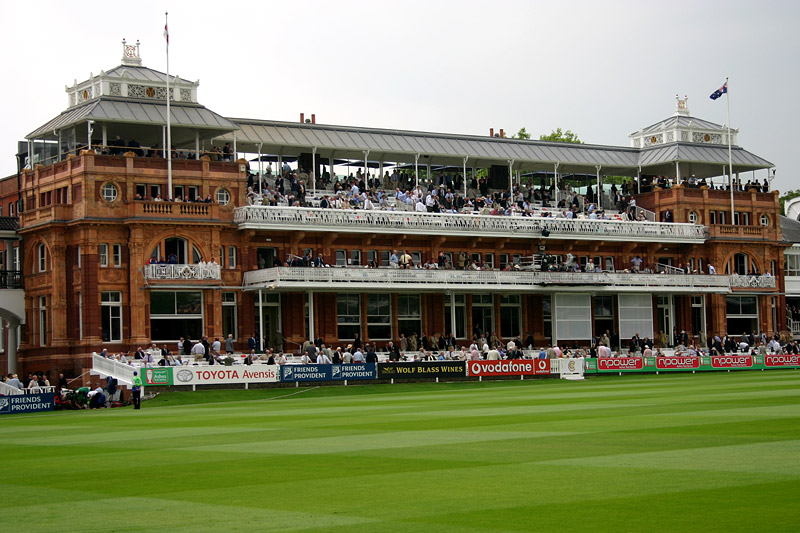
The pavilion at Lord's Cricket Ground, where Ganguly scored a century on debut

Symbol	Meaning
*	Remained not out
†	Captained the team
‡	Man of the match
Test	The number of the Test matches played in that series
Pos.	Position in the batting order
Inn.	The innings of the match
S/R	Strike rate during the innings
H/A/N	The venue was at home (India), away or neutral.
Lost	The match was lost by India.
Won	The match was won by India.
Drawn	The match was drawn.

== Test centuries ==
Centuries in Test cricket
No.	Score	Against	Pos.	Inn.	Test	Venue	H/A	Date	Result	Ref
1	131	England	3	2	2/3	Lord's Cricket Ground, London	Away	20 June 1996	Drawn	
2	136 ‡	England	3	1	3/3	Trent Bridge, Nottingham	Away	4 July 1996	Drawn	
3	147	Sri Lanka	6	2	2/2	Sinhalese Sports Club, Colombo	Away	9 August 1997	Drawn	
4	109	Sri Lanka	6	2	1/3	Punjab Cricket Association Stadium, Mohali	Home	19 November 1997	Drawn	
5	173 ‡	Sri Lanka	4	1	3/3	Wankhede Stadium, Mumbai	Home	3 December 1997	Drawn	
6	101*	New Zealand	4	4	3/3	Seddon Park, Hamilton	Away	2 January 1999	Drawn	
7	125	New Zealand	5	1	3/3	Sardar Patel Stadium, Ahmedabad	Home	29 October 1999	Drawn	
8	136 †	Zimbabwe	3	2	2/2	Feroz Shah Kotla, New Delhi	Home	28 February 2002	Won	
9	128 †	England	5	1	3/4	Headingley, Leeds	Away	22 August 2002	Won	
10	100* †	New Zealand	6	1	1/2	Sardar Patel Stadium, Ahmedabad	Home	8 October 2003	Drawn	
11	144 † ‡	Australia	5	2	1/4	Brisbane Cricket Ground, Brisbane	Away	4 December 2003	Drawn	
12	101 †	Zimbabwe	5	2	1/2	Queens Sports Club, Bulawayo	Away	13 September 2005	Won	
13	100	Bangladesh	5	1	1/2	Bir Shrestha Shahid Ruhul Amin Stadium, Chittagong	Away	18 May 2007	Drawn	
14	102	Pakistan	5	1	2/3	Eden Gardens, Kolkata	Home	30 November 2007	Drawn	
15	239 ‡	Pakistan	4	1	3/3	M. Chinnaswamy Stadium, Bangalore	Home	8 December 2007	Drawn	
16	102	Australia	6	1	2/4	Punjab Cricket Association Stadium, Mohali	Home	17 October 2008	Won	

== ODI centuries ==
Centuries in One Day Internationals
No.	Score	Against	Pos.	Inn.	S/R	Venue	H/A/N	Date	Result	Ref
1	113	Sri Lanka	2	1	89.68	R. Premadasa Stadium, Colombo	Away	20 August 1997	Lost	
2	124 ‡	Pakistan	1	2	89.85	Bangabandhu Stadium, Dhaka	Neutral	18 January 1998	Won	
3	105	New Zealand	2	1	75.00	Sharjah Cricket Association Stadium, Sharjah	Neutral	17 April 1998	Won	
4	109	Sri Lanka	1	1	80.14	R. Premadasa Stadium, Colombo	Away	7 July 1998	Won	
5	107* ‡	Zimbabwe	2	2	82.94	Queens Sports Club, Bulawayo	Away	27 September 1998	Won	
6	130* ‡	Sri Lanka	1	1	81.25	Vidarbha Cricket Association Ground, Nagpur	Home	22 March 1999	Won	
7	183 ‡	Sri Lanka	2	1	115.82	County Ground, Taunton	Neutral	26 May 1999	Won	
8	139 ‡	Zimbabwe	2	1	94.55	Gymkhana Club Ground, Nairobi	Neutral	1 October 1999	Won	
9	153* ‡	New Zealand	1	1	102.00	Captain Roop Singh Stadium, Gwalior	Home	11 November 1999	Won	
10	100	Australia	2	2	78.74	Melbourne Cricket Ground, Melbourne	Away	12 January 2000	Lost	
11	141 ‡	Pakistan	2	1	97.91	Adelaide Oval, Adelaide	Neutral	25 January 2000	Won	
12	105* † ‡	South Africa	1	2	75.53	Keenan Stadium, Jamshedpur	Home	12 March 2000	Won	
13	135* † ‡	Bangladesh	1	2	108.87	Bangabandhu Stadium, Dhaka	Away	30 May 2000	Won	
14	141* † ‡	South Africa	1	1	99.29	Gymkhana Club Ground, Nairobi	Neutral	13 October 2000	Won	
15	117 †	New Zealand	1	1	90.00	Gymkhana Club Ground, Nairobi	Neutral	15 October 2000	Lost	
16	144 † ‡	Zimbabwe	2	1	94.73	Sardar Patel Stadium, Ahmedabad	Home	5 December 2000	Won	
17	127 †	South Africa	1	1	100.79	New Wanderers Stadium, Johannesburg	Away	5 October 2001	Lost	
18	111 †	Kenya	1	1	89.51	Boland Park, Paarl	Neutral	24 October 2001	Won	
19	117* †	England	2	2	107.33	R. Premadasa Stadium, Colombo	Neutral	22 September 2002	Won	
20	112* †	Namibia	3	1	94.11	City Oval, Pietermaritzburg	Neutral	23 February 2003	Won	
21	107* † ‡	Kenya	3	2	89.16	Newlands Cricket Ground, Cape Town	Neutral	7 March 2003	Won	
22	111* † ‡	Kenya	3	1	97.36	Sahara Stadium Kingsmead, Durban	Neutral	20 March 2003	Won	
