= Cricket Association of Bengal =

Governing body for Cricket in West Bengal, India

- Sport: Cricket
- Jurisdiction: West Bengal
- Abbreviation: CAB
- Founded: 1928; 97 years ago
- Affiliation: BCCI
- Affiliation date: 2008
- Regional affiliation: East Zone
- Headquarters: Dr. Bidhan Chandra Roy Club House, Eden Gardens, Kolkata, West Bengal 700021
- President: Sourav Ganguly

Official website
- www.cricketassociationofbengal.com
- (India)

The Cricket Association of Bengal (CAB) is the governing body for cricket in the Indian state of West Bengal. It owns the Eden Gardens stadium in Kolkata, where its headquarters are located. CAB is a full member of the Board of Control for Cricket in India (BCCI) and organises various events in West Bengal. It manages the Bengal cricket team, which has competed in domestic tournaments since 1935 and plays its home matches at Eden Gardens.

== History ==
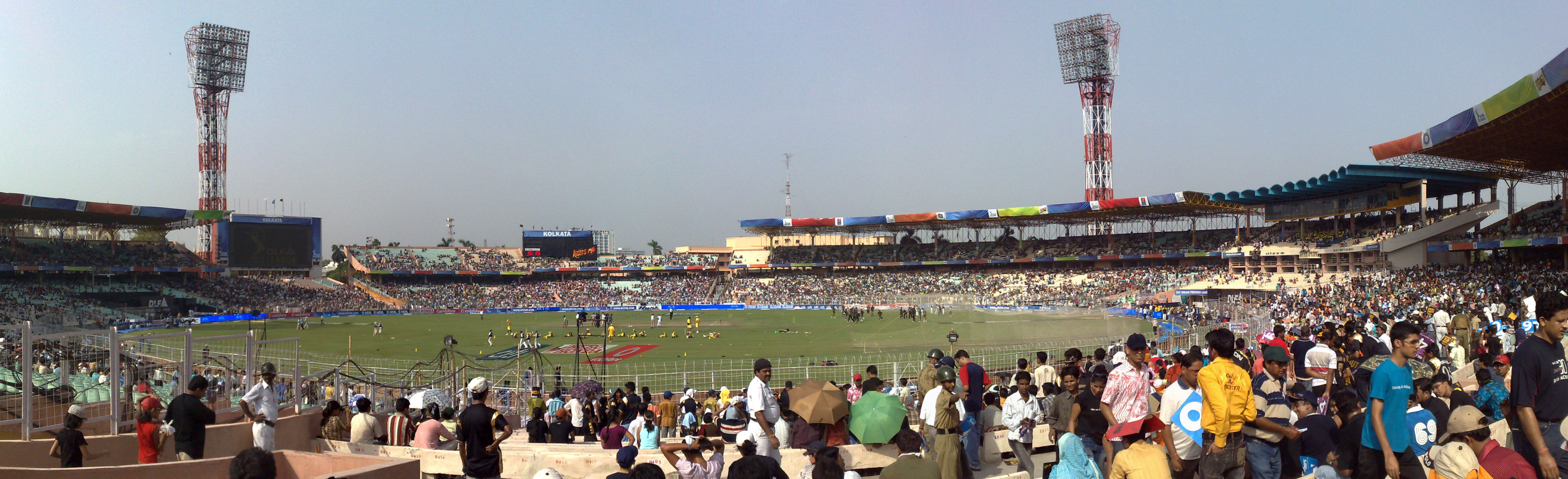
Panoramic View of the Eden Gardens during IPL 2008

Founded in 1928, the CAB has its headquarters in Kolkata and, its jurisdiction extends over the entire West Bengal. The Association has an Honorary President, many of whom have been well-known cricketers. Former Bengal and India captain Sourav Ganguly was in office from 2015 to 2019. He was succeeded by Avishek Dalmiya, the son of former BCCI president Jagmohan Dalmiya, until 2022. Snehasish Ganguly, brother of Sourav, has held office since October 2022.

CAB's most prominent role is management of the state team in national tournaments. Bengal had twice won the prestigious Ranji Trophy, in 1939 and 1990. The team has been runners-up 13 times and only Mumbai have appeared in more finals. CAB also organises international matches, especially at Eden Gardens which has hosted Test cricket since 1934.

Internally, the CAB organises various league and knockout district tournaments. These include age group competitions. Among the more noted tournaments are:

- CAB Superleague
- CAB First Division League
- CAB Senior Knockout
- CAB One Day League
- CAB Two Day League
- A. N. Ghosh Memorial Trophy
- P. Sen Trophy
- J. C. Mukherjee Trophy
