= Jete Nahi Dibo (film) =

Bengali romantic-drama film directed by Raj Chakraborty

- Directed by: Prabir Roy
- Screenplay by: Ashok Roy
- Produced by: Royz Media and Entertainment
- Starring: Sujan Mukherjee, Dulal Lahiri, Sudip Sarkar, Swastika Dutta, Mallika Sinha Roy, Debraj Roy, Rahul Burman, Anindo Sarkar
- Cinematography: Arindam Bhattacharjee
- Edited by: Joydeep Mukherjee
- Music by: Diptesh Pradipta
- Release date: September 1, 2023
- Running time: 116 Minutes
- Country: India
- Language: Bengali

Jete Nahi Dibo is an Indian Bengali docu-feature directed by Prabir Roy under the banner Royz Media and Entertainment.

== Synopsis ==
The “Docu-Feature” is narrated from Abir (played by Sudip Sarkar) and Ushahi's (played by Swastika Dutta) perspective, who are portrayed in the film to be very close to Uttam Kumar throughout 70's era until his death. They spent several hours with Uttam Kumar and others associated with the actor's family and friends. The actor's philosophy of life, his acting and struggle are showcased in this docu-feature.

== Controversy ==
The film became controversial during its proposed release. Family members of the actor opposed its release and moved to court. The film received an injunction and was barred from its scheduled release of 22 November 2019.

== Release ==
The film was released in Indian theaters on September 1, 2023.
