= Kaal Madhumas =

- Directed by: Prabir Roy
- Written by: Sunil Das
- Produced by: K.N Sharma
- Starring: Rimjhim Gupta, Sudip Sarkar, Arindam Sil, Saptarshi Ray, Ranjini Chatterjee, Debraj Roy and Neil Roy
- Cinematography: Sakti Banerjee
- Edited by: Dipak Mandal
- Music by: Biplab Chakraborty
- Release date: 13 September 2013
- Running time: 138 minutes
- Country: India
- Language: Bengali
- Budget: 92 Lacs

Kaal Madhumas is a 2013 Bengali film. The film was directed by Prabir Roy and produced by Adwik Entertainments. The music of the film was composed by Biplab Chakraborty. Kaal Madhumas had its all India Release on 13 September 2013. The film comprises 4 songs sung by Sreeradha Bandopadhay, Probal Mallick, Dr. Sandip Chakraborty and Reshmi Chakraborty. Kaal Madhumas has been voted the top internet publicized film. Kaal Madhumas was also the first Bengali Film to release its Android and IOS mobile app for the film where the cast and crew could directly interact with the audience in an interactive section of the app. Television actor Sudip Sarkar makes his debut in this film.

== Plot ==
The story of the film revolves around a Bengali homemaker Swati (Rimjhim Gupta) and her abusive advocate husband Kunal (Arindam Sil). Swati elopes with her neighbour Sarit (Sudip Sarkar) and embark on a journey of uncertainty. Swati meets her college friend Keya (Ranjini Chatterjee) and her husband Aninda (Saptarshi Ray) and spends some unforgettable days of their life in the hills while their prolonged honeymoon continues.

== Cast ==
- Sudip Sarkar
- Rimjhim Gupta
- Saptarshi Ray
- Ranjini Chatterjee
- Arindam Sil
- Debraj Roy
- Neil Roy
