= Snehasish Ganguly =

Indian cricketer (born 1968)

Personal information
- Full name: Snehasish Chandidas Ganguly
- Born: 11 June 1968 (age 58); Behala, Calcutta, West Bengal, India
- Batting: Left-handed
- Bowling: Right-arm off break
- Relatives: Sourav Ganguly (brother)

18th President of the Cricket Association of Bengal
- In office 2 November 2022 – 15 September 2025
- Preceded by: Avishek Dalmiya
- Succeeded by: Sourav Ganguly

Domestic team information
- Years: Team
- 1987–1997: Bengal

Career statistics
Competition	First-class	List A
Matches	59	18
Runs scored	2,534	275
Batting average	39.59	18.33
100s/50s	6/11	0/1
Top score	158	59
Balls bowled	576	12
Wickets	2	0
Bowling average	156.50	–
5 wickets in innings	0	–
10 wickets in match	0	–
Best bowling	1/48	–
Catches/stumpings	26/–	3/–
- Source: ESPNcricinfo

Snehasish Chandidas Ganguly (born 11 June 1968) is a former Indian first-class cricketer and president of the Cricket Association of Bengal. Snehasish had a career with Bengal which spanned ten years, however, he did not play internationally like his younger brother Sourav Ganguly. After retiring from cricket, he focused on his family's printing business. Over the past 15 years, Ganguly has taken NK Gossain Printers and grown it into one of the best-known printing companies in the region. He is also a member of the Board of Directors of Lux. In 1995, Ganguly married Mohiniyattam dancer Momm Ganguly. The couple had a daughter, Sneha, in 1998. He became the president of the Cricket Association of Bengal in October 2022.
