= Markelo Nasto =

Greek footballer

Personal information
- Date of birth: 23 July 2001 (age 25)
- Place of birth: Athens, Greece
- Position: Midfielder

Team information
- Current team: Trikala
- Number: 27

Youth career
- KF Albpetrol

Senior career*
Years	Team	Apps	(Gls)
2019–2020	Proodeftiki		
2020	Apollon Pontus	3	(0)
2020–	Trikala	0	(0)
- * Club domestic league appearances and goals as of 8 May 2021

Markelo Nasto (born 23 July 2001) is a Greek professional footballer who plays as a midfielder for Greek Super League 2 club Trikala.
