= Gautam Bhattacharya =

Indian sports journalist

- Born: Kolkata, West Bengal, India
- Occupation: Journalist
- Years active: 1983—present
- Spouse: Raya Bhattacharya
- Children: Lahoma Bhattacharya (Note: She is an Indian actress of Bengali cinema. She made her debut opposite Jeet in Raavan.)
- Website: Personal website

Gautam Bhattacharya is an Indian journalist and author. He began his career as a sports journalist. Subsequently, he expanded his field of work to become a published author, a cricket commentator on Star Sports, host of online shows, and anchor of national and international shows. He was the associate editor of Ananda Bazar Patrika in India. He handled both sports and entertainment for the publication. He joined Ananda Bazar Patrika in January 1983 as a trainee journalist with The Telegraph (Kolkata). From February 2017 to March 2022, Bhattacharya was the joint editor of the Bengali-language daily Sangbad Pratidin. From April 2022, for a brief period of 7 months, Bhattacharya was the editor of Zee 24 Ghanta, one of eastern India's most renowned TV channels. Since early 2023 he is working as the Joint Editor of Kolkata TV, a distinguished News Television channel of the state of West Bengal.

== Early life ==
Gautam Bhattacharya was born in South Kolkata and brought up in Chennai. His father was the Chief Accounts officer and Financial Advisor working with the Central Govt. He and his forefathers hailed from Sylhet, a city that even today is called the 'Tea Capital 'of Bangladesh.

== Education ==
Gautam Bhattacharya completed his schooling at the Ballygunge Government High School. He later graduated from St. Xavier's College, Kolkata. Seven days before the Indian Institute of Social Welfare and Business Management entrance examination in January 1983, he gave an interview to the editor of The Telegraph (Kolkata), M J Akbar. He was asked to join The Telegraph the same day.

== Books ==
Year of publication	Title	Language	Note	Ref.
	Sach		Biography of Sachin Tendulkar	
	Jaya He	Bengali		
	Wiki	Bengali		
	Barpujo	Bengali		
	Cupmohola			

== Awards and recognition ==
His efforts in journalism and skill of writing has fetched him many awards which include:

- Sports Editor of the year-2006 August, by Bengal Young Sports Journalists' Association
- Story of the year-2006 October, by Sports Journalists' Federation of India
- Excellence in Sports Journalism- 2008 September, by Shyam Steel Industries
- Sports Editor of the year- 2008 December, by Bengal Young Sports Journalists' Association.
- KKN Journalism Award
- Co-Author of book on cricket legend Sourav Ganguly (due in stands mid-2017)
- Author of Pankaj, the only authorized biography of legendary Indian Cricketer Pankaj Roy.
- Only Asian journalist to have exclusive interviews with the "Big Three" - Pelé, Don Bradman and Diego Maradona

== See also ==
- Ravi Chaturvedi
- Mayanti Langer
