= Bhola Tamang =

Bengali actor

Bhola Tamang is a Bengali film actor. He mainly plays side role characters in films.

== Filmography ==
- Hoichoi Unlimited (2018)
- Loafer (Upcoming)
- Final Mission (2013)
- Panga Nibi Na Sala (2013)
- Misti Cheler Dustu Buddhi (2013)
- Antore Shudhu Tumi (2012)
- Buddhuram Dhol Duniya Gol (2012)
- Mahakash Kando (2012)
- Haatchhani (2012)
- Hridoye Lekho Naam (2012)
- Chaal - The Games Begins (2012)
- Mone Pore Aajo Seidin (2011)
- Hello Memsaheb (2011)
- Keloda in Kashmir (2011)
- Love Birds (2011)
- Ek Tukro Chand (2010)
- Preyashi (2010)
- Shudhu Tomar Jonyo (2007)
- Samayer Chhayaguli (2006)
- Nishachar (2005)
- Rakhe Hari Mare Ke (2003)
- Sangee (2003)
- Sajoni Aamar Sohag (2000)
- Dadabhai (1999)
- Shatru Mitra (1999)

== Externarnal links ==
- Bhola Tamang at IMDb
