= Dona Ganguly =

Indian dancer (born 1976)

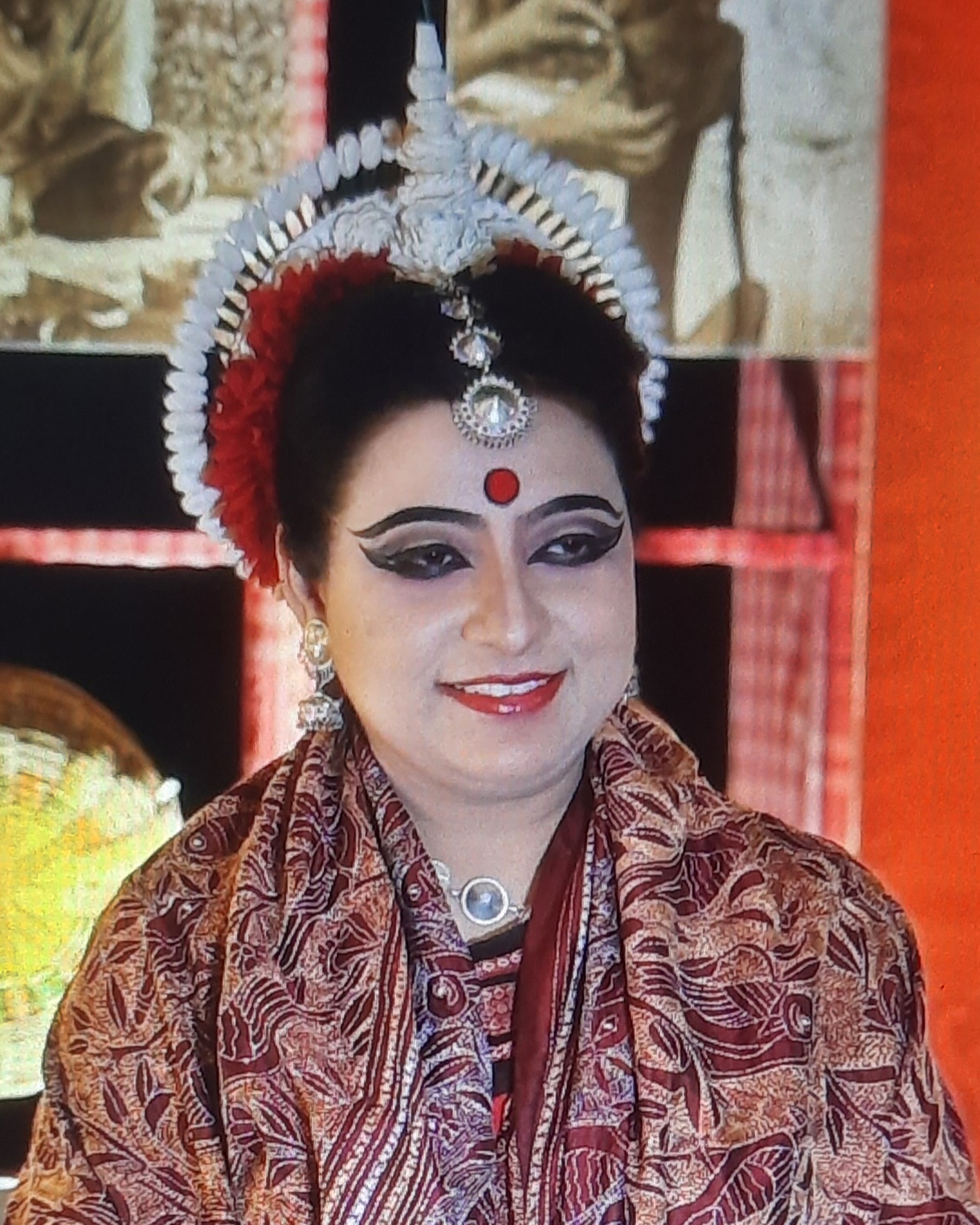
- Ganguly in 2024
- Born: Dona Roy; 22 August 1975 (age 51); Behala, Calcutta, India
- Occupation: Odissi dancer
- Organization: Diksha Manjari
- Spouse: Sourav Ganguly (m. 1997)
- Children: 1
- Parents: Sanjeev Roy; Swapna Roy
- Website: www.donaganguly.com

Dona Ganguly (née Roy; born 22 August 1975) is an Indian Odissi dancer. She took her dancing lessons from guru Kelucharan Mohapatra. She has a dance troupe Diksha Manjari.

== Personal life ==
Dona Ganguly was born on 22 August 1976 in an affluent business family in Behala, Kolkata. Her parents were Sanjeev Roy (father) and Swapna Roy (mother). She was a student of Loreto Convent School.

She eloped with her childhood friend Sourav Ganguly because their families were sworn enemies at that time. Later their families accepted the marriage and a formal wedding took place in February 1997. The couple have a daughter Sana Ganguly.

On 5 October 2022, she was infected with mosquito-borne disease Chikungunya and was admitted to Woodlands Hospital, Kolkata.

== Dancing career ==
Dona Ganguly started learning dance from Amala Shankar when she was only 3 years old. Later she shifted to Odissi under the guidance of Guru Giridhari Nayek. Dona considers the most significant development took place when she met Kelucharan Mohapatra and started taking dancing lessons from him. At early stage of her career, in different programs, Mohapatra accompanied her many times with Pakhavaj.

=== Performances ===
- Dover Lane Music Conference, Kolkata
- Konarak Festival, Konarak
- River Festival, Kolkata
- Uday Shankar Dance Festival, Kolkata
- Barak Utsov, Silchar, Assam
- Dakshin Mukambi National Festival, Kottayam, Kerala
- Baba Alauddin Khan Sangeet Samaraho (Maihar), M.P.
- Bali Yatra Cuttack
- Kumar Utsov, Bhubaneswar
- Bharat Bhavan, Bhopal
- Haridas Samaraho, Brindavhan
- Samudra Maha Utsov, Puri
- Beach Festival, Digha
- Haldia Utsov, Haldia
- Sankat Mochan Festival Varanasi
- Ganga Maha Utsov, Varanasi
- Antiquity Festival, Kolkata
- Muktashwar Festival, Bhubaneswar
- Mirtunjay Utsov, Varanasi
- Bhojpur Festival, Bhopal
- Kalidas Samoraho, Ujjain
- Taj Mohotsav, Agra
- World Expo, China, 2010
- Chaitrakut Mohotsav, Chitrakut
- Narmada Mohotsav, Jabalpur

=== Diksha Manjari ===
Dona Ganguly has a dance school named Diksha Manjari. This institution was inaugurated by Lata Mangeshkar. It has capacity of more than 2000 students. Other than dancing, this institution has other departments like Yoga, Drawing, Karate and Swimming.

In October 2012, Dona Ganguly choreographed Rabindranath Tagore's Shapmochan which she called a sombre dance drama.
