= Panga Nibi Na Sala =

2013 film

- Directed by: Prince
- Produced by: S.P. Series
- Starring: Arko; Neha; Ashish Samal; Anamika Saha
- Edited by: Kalyan Mitra
- Music by: Sujata Mascharak
- Release date: 15 March 2013 (Kolkata)
- Country: India
- Language: Bengali

Panga Nibi Na Sala (or sometimes Panga Nibi Na Shala) is a 2013 Bengali action film directed by Prince and presented by Dr. Shaktidhar Mukherjee under the banner of S.P. Series. The film stars actors Arko and Neha in the lead roles.

== Plot ==
The story of the film revolves around a goon, Kali, who terrorizes the residents of a locality and is hand on hand with the Officer in Charge of the local police station, Pritam who fully ignores all his activities. He carries out all illegal activities and goes around killing people with impunity. Anyone who messes with Kali is murdered. Rohit’s younger sister is killed by Kali's goons when she witnesses a murder. His father is later arrested on false charges and is later killed by the Officer in Charge-pritam . His mother protested at this and even she was killed afterwards by Officer n Charge Pritam at their residence. All this transforms Rohit into a different person. In pursuit of his revenge, he starts killing everyone who has directly or indirectly harmed the family.

== Cast ==
- Arko
- Neha
- Asish Sasmal
- Anamika Saha
- Debraj Ray
- Ramen Roychowdhury
- Sumit Gangopadhyay
- Bhola Tamang

== Soundtrack ==
Panga Nibi Na Sala

Soundtrack album by Sujata Mascharak
- Released: 11 September 2012
- Genre: Feature film soundtrack
- Label: S.P. Series

The soundtrack of Panga Nibi Na Sala has been composed by Sujata Macharak, who is the director's wife. The playback singers include Sujoy Bhowmik, Rima Mukherjee, Sujata Mascharak and Baby Anwesha. The soundtrack was released on 11 September 2012 at the Press Club, Kolkata.

== Critical reception ==
Professional ratings
Review scores
| Source | Rating |
|---|---|
| "in.com". | 0.5/5 stars |
| "Gomolo.com". | 1.5/5 stars |

Panga Nibi Na Sala received very bad remarks from critics. From dialogues to acting to soundtrack, nothing was well accepted by the audience. Only Asish Sasmal, actor (o.c.-pritam), as new villain in Indian film industry appear & accepted by audience /critics, have done gd job .

== See also ==
- Challenge
- Challenge 2
- Kanamachi
