= Prabir Roy =

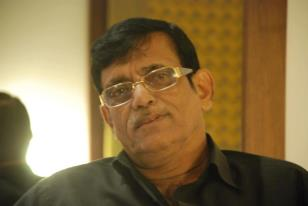
- Roy in January 2013
- Born: 31 August 1948 (age 77); Calcutta, India
- Occupations: Producer, Director and Actor
- Spouse: Somasree Roy
- Children: Piyali Roy Singh and Neil Roy
- Awards: Pramathesh Barua Award and Uttam Kumar Award

Prabir Roy (born 31 August 1948) is an Indian producer, director and actor in Bengali cinema. He made his debut as a feature film maker with the film Kaal Madhumas. He also served as the Sheriff of Kolkata in 2003.

== Early life ==
Roy is a commerce graduate from the University of Calcutta. He was a national level swimmer in his younger days. Grew up in a posh locality in South Kolkata. He has the distinction of introducing colour T.V. coverage in India in Feb-March, 1982 during the 1st Nehru Gold Cup. This was held at Eden Gardens, Kolkata in February 1982. The programme was covered with 5 on-line camera operation, long before Doordarshan started the same during the Delhi Asian Games in November 1982. This was inaugurated by Late Prime Minister Mrs Indira Gandhi. He also produced "Ravishankar-A Legend of Glory". This programme represented Doordarshan in International T.V. Network Festival which was held in Miami, U.S.A. in September 1984. It was Pt. Ravishankar's first Indian TV appearance.

== Production and direction ==
=== T.V serials and feature films ===
- Ravishankar-A Legend of Glory (3 episodes) – directed by Prabir Roy
- Soviet Circus (4 episodes) – directed by Prabir Roy
- Bichitra Tadanta (13 episodes) – directed by Inder Sen
- Grihadaha (13 episodes) – directed by Inder Sen
- Anya Galpo (DDK Commissioned) (4 episodes) – directed by Prabir Roy
- Bahiri (11 episodes) – directed by Bratati Chowdhury
- Harano Sur (DDK Commissioned) (4 episodes) – directed by Prabir Roy
- Sabdo Jabdo (6 episodes) – directed by Debraj Roy
- Ananda Bahar (12 episodes) – directed by Prabir Roy
- Panch Dashaker Romantic Juti (13 episodes) – directed by Bijon Chatterjee
- Nirjan Dupurer Premer Gaan (13 episodes) – directed by Bijon Chatterjee
- Jatak Kanya (13 episodes) – directed by Amal Sur
- Nrityer Tale Tale (53 episodes) – directed by Bratati Chowdhury
- Manik (586 episodes) – directed by Saibal Banerjee
- Kaal Madhumas (feature film) produced by K.N Sharma
- Jete Nahi Dibo (feature film) – produced by Royz Media and Entertainment

=== Adfilms and commercials ===
- Calcutta Chemical
- Chesmi Glycerine Soap
- Bijoli Grill Nice Cream
- Bijoli Grill Ice Cream Soda
- Peerless Bazar
- Plus Phenyle
- Everest Phenyle

=== Corporate, telefilm and documentary ===
- Kitply
- Rabindranath O Tripura
- Samsan Chapa – Directed by Bratati Chowdhury & Prabir Roy (For Etv-Bangla)
- Mahamaya- Directed by Prabir Roy (For Aakash Bangla)
- Tyag- Directed by Rana Bannerjee (For Aakash Bangla)

== Acting ==
- Ajker Nayak
- Ek Din Surja
- Rabibar
- Nayan Shyama
- IF
- Ajkal Porshur Golpo
- Notun Surja
- Janmabhoomi (T.V Serial)
- Samparka(T.V Serial)
- Abhinetri (T.V Serial)
- Harano Sur (T.V Serial)
- Bichitra Tadanta (T.V Serial)
- Sabdo Jabdo (T.V Serial)

== Awards and recognition ==
- Pramathesh Barua Award
- Uttam Kumar Award
- Bijitra Tadanta was judged the best TV Serial in Eastern India in 1987
- Grihadaha was judged the best TV Serial in Eastern India in 1988
- Prabir Roy, the lead actor in film Nayan Shyama, went to British Film Institute (BFI)
