= Sukumar Ray (film) =

1987 documentary by Satyajit Ray

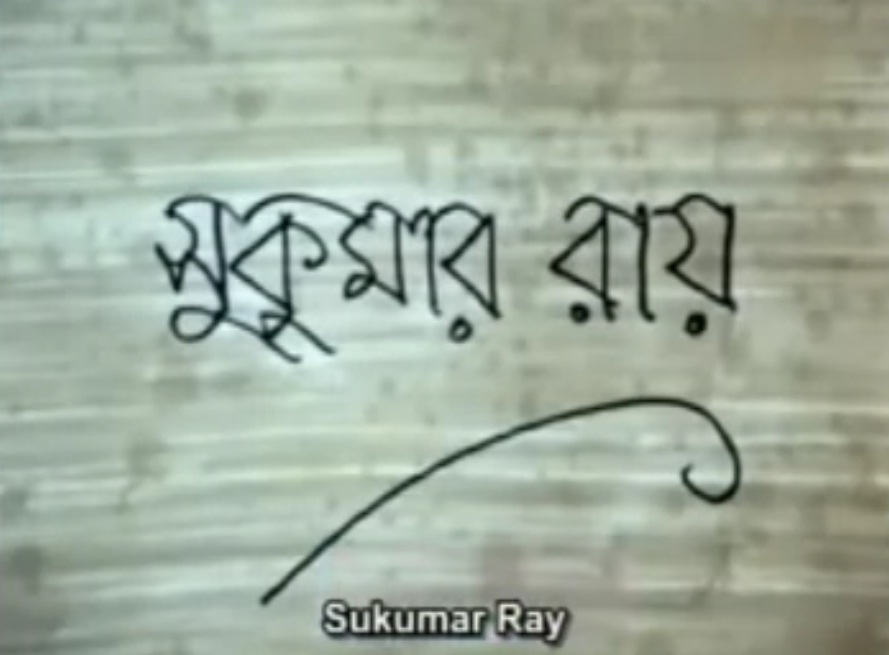
- Title card of the film
- Directed by: Satyajit Ray
- Screenplay by: Satyajit Ray
- Based on: Life and works of Sukumar Ray
- Produced by: Government of West Bengal
- Starring: Utpal Dutt; Soumitra Chatterjee; Tapen Chatterjee; Santosh Dutta
- Narrated by: Soumitra Chatterjee
- Cinematography: Barun Raha
- Edited by: Dulal Dutta
- Music by: Satyajit Ray
- Production company: Indrapuri Studio
- Release date: 1987
- Running time: 30 minutes
- Country: India
- Language: Bengali

Sukumar Ray is a 1987 Bengali short documentary film made by Satyajit Ray on his father, Sukumar Ray. It was released during the birth centenary year of Sukumar Ray, who was born on 30 October 1887. The thirty minutes documentary features the life and some of the works by Sukumar Ray in the form of paintings, photographs and readings.

This is the last documentary made by Satyajit Ray as a tribute to his father, before he died in 1992. The documentary used Sukumar Ray's photographs and paintings than video recording as the film was considerably a new medium in India when Sukumar Ray died in 1923.

== Background ==
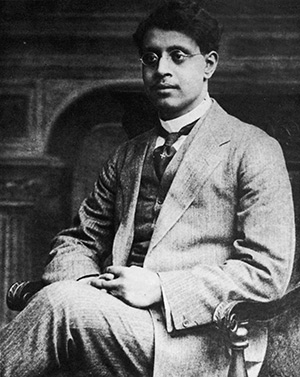
Sukumar Ray

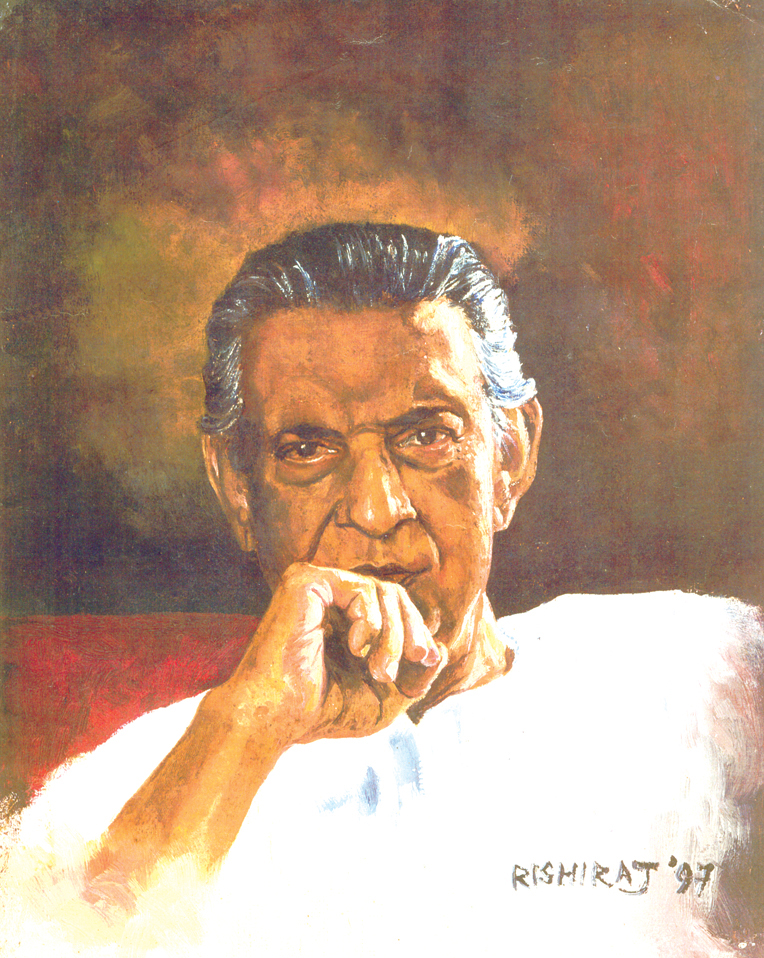
Satyajit Ray

Sukumar Ray was a Bengali humorous poet, story writer and playwright who mainly wrote for children. Born in a Bengali family on 30 October 1887 to Bidhumukhi and Upendrakishore Ray, Sukumar Ray is a second children of six and illustrator of literary nonsense and nonsense rhyme in Bengali literature. Graduated with Honours degree in Physics and Chemistry from the Presidency College, Kolkata, Sukumar Ray got training in photography and printing technology in England at the School of Photo-Engraving and Lithography, London. He formed the "Nonsense Club" and the "Monday Club", the members of which included some of the young artists, writers, scholars and critics of that time. Ray was also associated with Brahmo Samaj and wrote a poem called "Atiter Katha" for young readers. His works such as the collection of poems Abol Tabol (Gibberish), novella HaJaBaRaLa (The Absurdity), short story collection Pagla Dashu (Crazy Dashu) and play Chalachitta Chanchari are considered nonsense masterpieces. Father of film-maker Satyajit Ray, Sukumar Ray died of severe infectious fever, Leishmaniasis on 10 September 1923.

== Synopsis ==
With Soumitra Chatterjee as a narrator, the documentary begins by showcasing some of the drawings by Sukumar Ray, drawn for the children books Abol Tabol, HaJaBaRaLa and a short story, Heshoram Hushiarer Diary (The Diary of Heshoram: The Clever). Explaining the lineage of Ray family starting from Hari Krishna Roy Chowdhury and Upendrakishore Ray, the documentary describes initial days of Sukumar Ray, his formation of the "Nonsense Group" in the college and publication of handwritten humorous magazine, "Thirty Two and a Half Fries".

Utpal Dutt enacts as a teacher from Ray's first published poetical "nonsense"-play Jhala Pala (The Cacophony) and provides humorous explanation/translation of the sentence "I go up, we go down" in Bengali. Soumitra Chatterjee appears as Rama, the avatar of the Hindu god Vishnu, in a spoof based on an Indian epic Ramayana, Lakshmaner Shaktishel (The magical spear of Lakshmana). The spoof is based on Rama's dream about the central antagonist of the Ramayana, the demon-king Ravana and the spy (Tapen Chatterjee) providing further information about it. The documentary also focusses on Ray's college days in London while studying photography, lithography and his meeting with Nobel Prize–winning littérateur, Rabindranath Tagore. While narrating his first poem Khichudi (The mixture) published in children's magazine, Sandesh, launched by his father, the documentary explains how entire Ray family worked together for the growth of the magazine after the death of Upendrakishore Ray.

Mentioning his association with Brahmo Samaj, the documentary ends with Sukumar Ray's terminal disease and his death on 10 September 1923.

== Credits ==
=== Cast ===
- Utpal Dutt as Village teacher (character of the play Jhala Pala)
- Soumitra Chatterjee as Rama (from the play Lakshmaner Shaktishel (The magical spear of Lakshmana))
- Tapen Chatterjee as informer (from the play Lakshmaner Shaktishel)
- Chiranjeet as Lakshmana (from the play Lakshmaner Shaktishel)
- Santosh Dutta
- Nirmal Ghosh
- Bimal Deb
- Ramesh Mukhopadhyay
- Sambarta Sarkar
- Soumya Patra
- Chinmay Chatterjee
- Utpal Roy
- Shamik Banerjee
- Sougata Banerjee
- Ankur Chatterjee
- Soumendranath Das

=== Crew ===
- Narration: Soumitra Chatterjee
- Editor: Dulal Dutta
- Art direction: Ashoke Bose
- Sound designer: Sujit Sarkar
- Cinematographer: Barun Raha
- Still photographer: Nemai Ghosh, Hirak Sen, Satyaki
- Make up: Ananta Das

=== Music ===
- Music direction: Satyajit Ray
- Assistant music director: Aloknath Dey
- Singer: Anup Ghoshal
- Chorus: Biswajeet Gupta, Debashish Roy Chowdhury, Arup Majumder, Prabuddha Raha, Shekhar Gupta, Aditya Narayan Biswas
- Song recording: Sushanta Banerjee
- Re-recording: Jyoti Chatterjee, Anup Mukhopadhyay
