= Abol Tabol =

Nonsense verse by Sukumar Ray

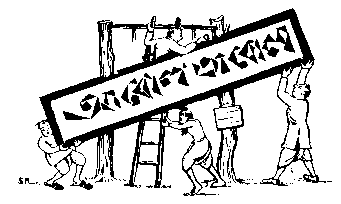
- Author: Sukumar Ray
- Language: Bengali
- Genre: Poetry
- Publisher: U. Ray and Sons
- Publication date: September 19, 1923
- Publication place: India
- Text: Abol Tabol at Wikisource

Abol tabol (Bengali: আবোল তাবোল;; lit. 'The Weird and the Absurd') is a collection of Bengali children's poems and rhymes composed by Sukumar Ray, first published on 19 September 1923 by U. Ray and Sons publishers. It consists of 46 titled and seven untitled short rhymes (quatrains), all considered to be in the genre of nonsense literature.

== Significance ==
Bengali readers were exposed to a new nonsense fantasy world by the poems in Abol Tabol. This selection offers the best of Sukumar Ray's world of pun-riddled poetry.

Although it was not understood at the time of its publication, many poems in Abol Tabol contain hidden satire on the state of society and administration of early 20th-century colonial India - mostly Bengal. Embedding implied hidden meanings of a subversive nature in nonsense rhymes for children, was Ray's way of subverting press censorship by the then British administration in India, which was paranoid about seditious and subversive literature.

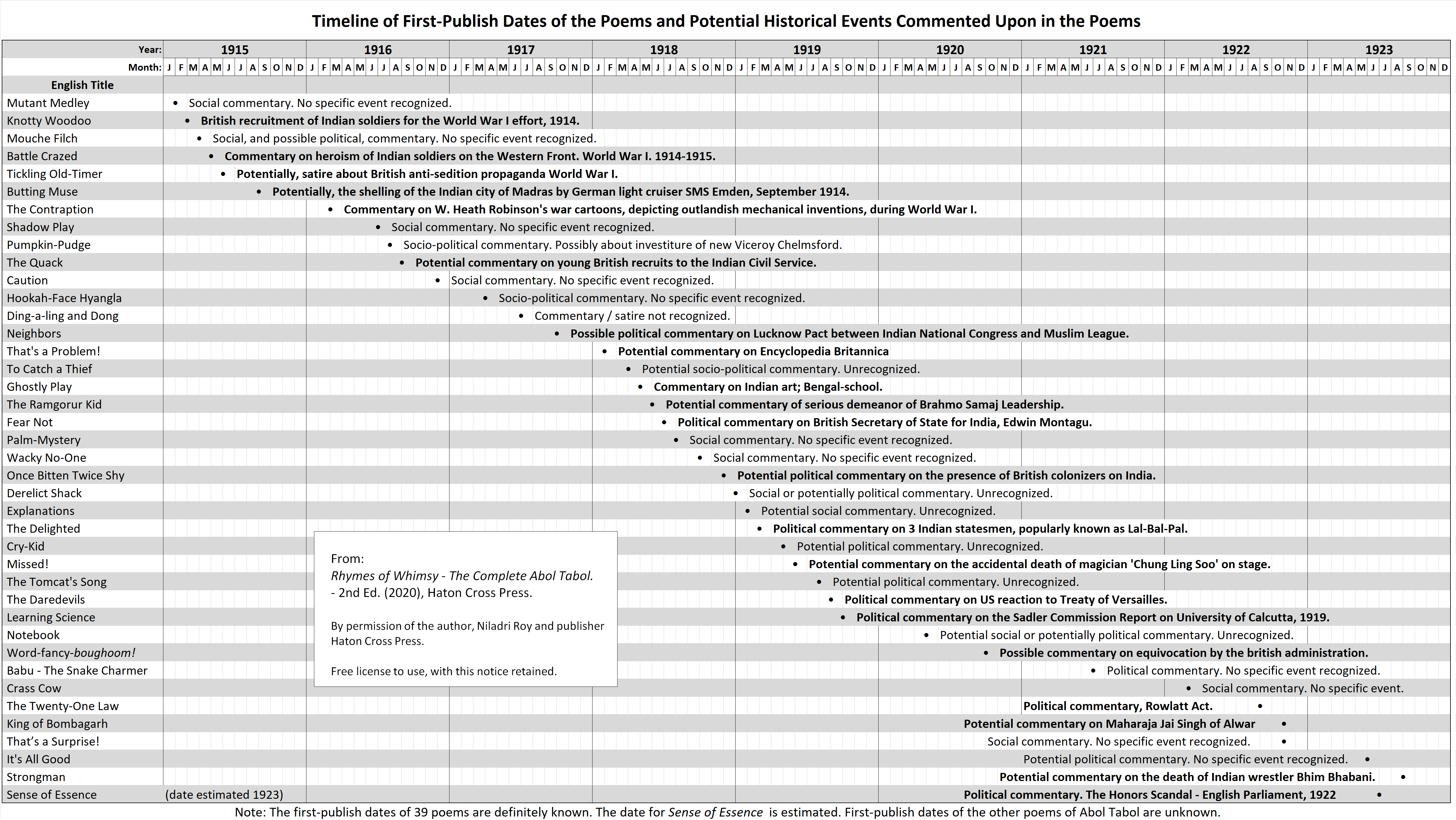
Timeline and brief explanations of historical events commented upon in the poems of Abol Tabol.

In analytical literature since 2017, the poems in Abol Tabol have been plotted on a timeline and compared with contemporaneous events, research having yielded plausible connections between historical events and the commentary and satire hidden in many of the poems. A significant perspective on Ray's Abol Tabol has been explored by Hirak Bhattacharya in his article entitled, "Rethinking Sukumar Ray's Abol Tabol as a Multimodal Text". Bhattacharya contends that, Ray's visionary mind accompanied the poems of Abol Tabol with illustrations. Such sketches invited unschooled learners to have a comprehensive understanding of the text without delving deep into the dynamics of alphabetical logarithms. The illustrations accompanying Ray's poems appeal to the aesthetic sense of the readers, which creates perceptual understanding of the poems by appealing to their sensory perceptions. In this way, Bhattacharya, explores the multimodal aspects of the text, that transcends the liminality of a text-centred approach.

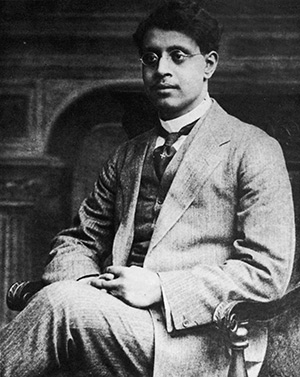
Sukumar Ray

== Publication history ==
Sukumar Ray wrote for Sandesh, a children's magazine started by his father Upendrakishore Ray Chowdhury in Calcutta. The poems in Abol Tabol, most of which first appeared in Sandesh, were composed between 1915 and 1923. Abol Tabol was originally the name designating a section within Sandesh where many of these poems were first published. Thirty-nine poems and seven untitled quatrains can be traced back to having first appeared in Sandesh. Seven other poems making up the balance of the collection were selected by Ray possibly from previously unpublished manuscripts. The first and the last poems, both titled Abol Tabol were written by Ray specifically for the collection possibly in 1923.

== Characters ==
His collection had several characters which became legendary in Bengali literature and culture. Some characters even have found idiomatic usage in the language.

Some of the most famous characters in "Abol tabol" are:

- Kaathburo (Poem: Kaathburo)

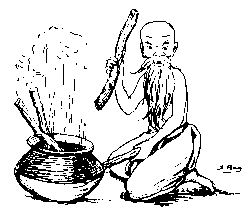
Kathburo

- Head Officer Boro Babu (Poem: Gnof Churi)

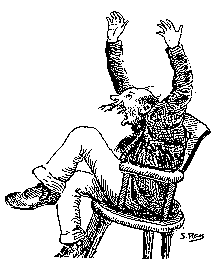
Gnofchuri

- Kumro Potash (Poem: Kumro Potash)
- Gangaram (Poem: Sat Patro)
- Chandidaser Khuro (Poem: Khuror Kal)
- Bombagoder Raja (Poem: Bombagorer Raja)

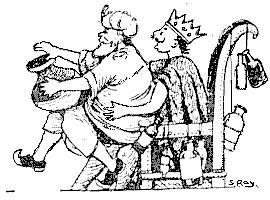
Bombagoder Raja

- Hnukumukho Hyangla (Poem: Hnukumukho Hyangla)
- Ramgoruder Chhana (Poem: Ramgorurer Chhana)

Ramgaruder Chhana

- Tnyash Goru (Poem: Tnyash Goru)

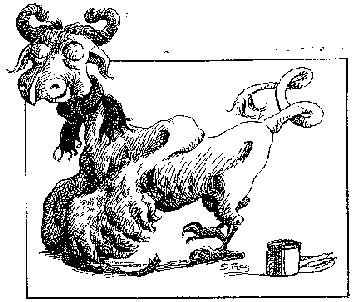
Tnyashgoru

- Shashthi Charan (Poem: Palowan)

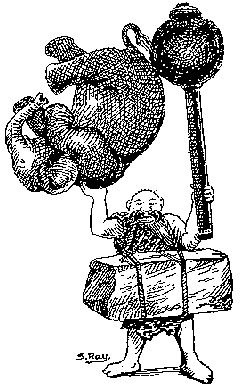
Shashthi Charan

- Jagmohan (Poem: Thikana)
- Panta Bhoot (Poem: Bhooture Khela)
- Nera (Poem: Nera Beltolay Jay Kobar?)

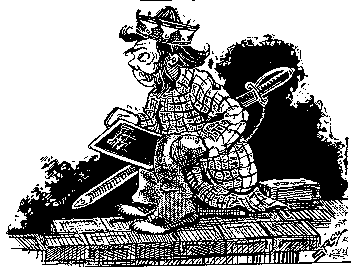
Nera Beltolay Jay Kobar?

- Katukutu Buro (Poem: Katukutu Buro)
- Bhisman Lochan Sharma (Poem : Ganer Gunto)

== English Translations ==
A complete translation of all 53 poems appears in Rhymes of Whimsy - The Complete Abol Tabol, trans. Niladri Roy (Haton Cross Press, 2017). A dual-language edition (Haton Cross Press, 2017) includes the Bengali originals; the second edition (Haton Cross Press, 2020) includes the original illustrations by Sukumar Ray.

The Tenth Rasa: An Anthology of Indian Nonsense, ed. Michael Heyman, Sumanyu Satpathy and Anushka Ravishankar (Penguin, 2007) includes several translations of poems from Abol Tabol by Sampurna Chattarji.

Abol Tabol: The Nonsense World of Sukumar Ray trans. Sampurna Chattarji (Puffin, 2004) includes a partial translation and additionally includes translations of Khapchhada, Bohurupee, Other Stories, Haw-Jaw-Baw-Raw-Law, Khai-Khai, and Pagla Dashu.

The Select Nonsense of Sukumar Ray trans. Sukanta Chaudhuri (Oxford University Press, 1987) is a partial translation and contains an introduction by Satyajit Ray.

Nonsense Rhymes trans. Satyajit Ray (Calcutta Writer's Workshop, 1970) is a partial translation.
