= Akhil Niyogi =

Bengali writer

- অখিল নিয়োগী
- Born: 25 October 1902; Sankrail-Tangail, Bengal Presidency, British India
- Died: 21 February 1993 (aged 90); Kolkata, India
- Other name: Swapanburo (স্বপনবুড়ো)
- Education: Scottish Church Collegiate School
- Known for: Bengali Literature
- Awards: Vidyasagar Puraskar (1988)

Akhil Niyogi also known as Swapanburo (25 October 1902 — 21 February 1993) was a Bengali children's writer and editor. He is better known by the pseudonym Swapnaburo.

== Early life ==
He was born as Akhilbandhu Niyogi in 1902 at Sankrail-Tangail village of Mymensingh district, now Bangladesh. Niyogi's father's name is Govinda Chandra Niyogi and mother is Bhavatarini Devi. His father was a headmaster of Bindubasini High School at Tangail. He Passed Matriculation from Scottish Church Collegiate School and ISC from City College. Later he got admission in Government College of Art & Craft.

== Career ==
While studying at Government Art College his novel 'Beporoya' was published serially in Shisusathi magazine. While a student at the Art College, he was the founder-editor of the Artist Welfare Society. A magazine called Chitra was published on behalf of the society. Niyogi started his career as a commercial artist later he was seen in the roles of lyricist, director, actor etc. He was the screenwriter of the documentary on Sriniketan produced by the West Bengal government during Rabindranath's lifetime. He directed the film Muktir Bandhan. Since 1945 onward, he was a regular contributor of the Jugantar magazine. He used to write songs for children under the pseudonym 'Swapnaburo' and gradually became popular by this name. He went to Vienna in 1952 at the invitation of the International Committee of the Red Cross. Netaji's wife and daughter were first mentioned in his book Sat Samudra Tero Nadir Pare. In 1988, the Government of West Bengal honored him with the Vidyasagar Award.

== Published books ==
- Babuibasa Boarding
- Banpalashir Khude Dakat
- Bastuhara
- Panka Theke Padma Jage
- Dhanni Chele
- Kishore Abhijan
- Pala Parban Chara-chanda
- Bhuture Desh
- Khelar Sathi

== Death ==
Akhil Niyogi died on 21 February 1993 in Calcutta.

== See also ==
- Ashapoorna Devi
- Premendra Mitra
- Leela Majumdar
- Khagendranath Mitra
- Dhirendralal Dhar
