= Nalini Das =

Bengali writer (1916–1993)

- Born: 5 August 1916; Calcutta, Bengal Presidency, British India
- Died: 26 March 1993 (aged 76); Calcutta, West Bengal, India
- Occupations: Educationist, writer, editor
- Known for: Notable Bengali writer of mid 20th century
- Notable work: Goyenda Gondalu, Editor of Sandesh Children's magazine

Nalini Das ( 5 August 1916 – 26 March 1993) was a Bengali educationist, writer and editor. She was one of the editors of the Bengali children's magazine Sandesh.

== Early life ==
Nalini Das was born to Arunnath Chakraborty and Punyalata (Ray Chowdhury). Her father was a deputy magistrate posted in Bihar, and her mother was the daughter of Bengali writer, technologist and entrepreneur Upendrakishore Ray Chowdhury. Bengali writer Sukumar Ray was her maternal uncle, and Oscar-winning filmmaker Satyajit Ray her cousin. She completed her matriculation from the Brahmo Balika Shikshalaya and IA from St. John's Diocesan Girls' Higher Secondary School in Calcutta.

She studied philosophy at Scottish Church College, Calcutta. She studied for the master's degree in philosophy at the University of Calcutta. She was a brilliant scholar and came first class first in both B.A. and M.A. examinations. In B.A. she scored highest marks among arts examinees in all subjects.

== Professional career ==
Das was a member of the faculty of the Department of Philosophy in the Victoria Institution immediately after her education. Later on she joined the Educational Service of the Bengal Government. In 1945, she was sent to England on a government scholarship for learning about school teachers' training. On return, she joined the newly established David Hare Training College. When a separate teachers' training college for women, the Institute of Education for Women, was set up, she became a senior member of its faculty. Later she became the principal of that Institute.

Later she was the principal (1968–1974) of Bethune College. An award honouring her is given for best all-round performance in the college.

== Writer and editor ==
Along with her elder sister, Kalyani Karlekar, in the 1930s and 1940s she edited a Bengali a women's magazine Meyeder Katha.

Das created the first schoolgirl female detectives of Bengali literature. The Goenda Gondalu (translated into English as the Lu Quartet by Swapna Dutta), are four young schoolgirls who solve mysteries.

From 1964 till her death in 1993, she was one of the three editors of the Bengali children's magazine Sandesh, which operated out of her home. She wrote a book about the childhood days of her cousin Satyajit Ray, Shaat Rajar Dhon Ek Manik. She edited children's books along with Lila Majumdar and Ray.

== Personal life ==
Nalini Das married Ashokananda Das, brother of Bengali poet Jibanananda Das. Writer and publisher Amitananda Das is their son.

== Awards ==
Nalini Das was awarded the Vidyasagar Memorial Award in 1990 by West Bengal Govt.

== Published works ==
Title	Publisher	Year
Ra-Ka-Je-Te-Na-Pa	New Script	1958
Rangangarer Rahashya	Granthaprakash	1978
Madhyarater Ghorshoyar	Ananda	1980
Oshoririr Ashor - Edited by Lila Majumdar, Nalini Das and Satyajit Ray	New Script	1988
Hatighishar Hanabari	New Script	
Saras Rahashya - Edited by Lila Majumdar, Nalini Das and Satyajit Ray	New Script	1989
Shaat Rajar Dhon Ek Manik	New Script	1993
Upendra Kishore Rochona Samagra	Annapurna Prakashani	
Moruprasader Rahashya	Ananda Publishers	1993
Goyenda Gondalu Samagra - I	New Script	2009
Goyenda Gondalu Samagra - II	New Script	2012
The Lu Quartet - Super sleuth and other stories	Hachette India	2012
Galpa O Upanyas Samagra - III	New Script	2014
Europer Chithi	New Script	2016
