= U. Ray and Sons =

U. Ray and Sons was a privately held blockmaking, printing and publishing firm in Calcutta, India founded by Upendrakishore Ray in 1895. At its inception the firm was named U. Ray after its owner; and Sons was added in 1900 when his son Sukumar Ray joined the firm. It was notable for internationally pioneering work in halftone process work. The firm became bankrupt in 1926, but the business was revived under a new owner in 1929. The Successor of this printing press is Ayan Banerjee.

== Blockmaking Business ==
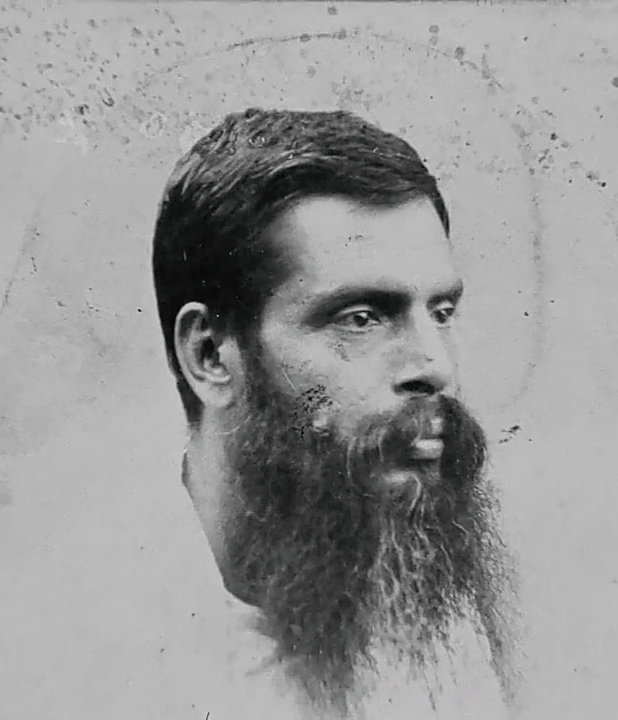
Upendra kishore Ray chowdhury, Founder

U. Ray and Sons was primarily set up as an initiative to remedy the lack of cost-effective metal blocks for the printing of illustrations in Calcutta in spite of the existence of good printing presses in the early 1890s. Upendrakishore, a versatile genius, excelling in the fields of children's literature, music, painting and printing technology could not therefore have first grade illustrations published for his Children’s Ramayan. A lack of skill in graphic arts and photo-processes resulted in ruined print illustrations. 'At that time, only a few local firms like Thacker and Spincks (of Thacker's Indian Directory) took commercial orders for halftone blocks but they were very costly. Being of an inventive and mechanical turn of mind, Upendrakishore ordered the necessary equipment from A.W. Penrose & Co., of 109 Farringdon Street, London, and began to study the technical nature of the subject.

'A camera and various pieces of half-tone equipment [arrived] from Britain [...] by bullock cart; soon after that, they moved out of 13 Cornwallis Street to a house not far away at Shibnarain Dass Lane, which Upendrakisore had made into a residence-cum-business premises, including a studio.

The firm first advertised in 1895 that they were undertaking bromide enlargements and half-tone printmaking. Within two years of the establishment of the firm, advertisements appeared in the Amrita Bazar Patrika on 25 November 1896 (the leading daily newspaper of its time) stating the undertaking of 'half-tone block bromide enlargements of the highest quality only' and 'half-tone block from photograph etc. at Rupee One.' Another advertisement appeared in the same newspaper on 2 July 1897 and provides more details-

HALF-TONE BLOCKS :

U. Ray begs leave to state that by his new method of half-tone engraving he is prepared to give result as very few persons in the world have hitherto produced. He can now undertake to make half-tone blocks of the following degrees of fineness of grain : 75, 85, 120, 133, 170, 240 and 266 lines to the inch. The patterns he can produce are simply innumerable. Price for the ordinary kind of grains up to 133 lines— Zinc blocks at Re 1 per sq. inch. Copper blocks at Re 1-8 per sq. inch. Price for more artistic work on application to: U. Ray, B.A., Artist. 38-1 Shibnarain Dass Lane, Calcutta.

== Technical Innovation ==
The studies on block-making technology led him to investigate the theoretical basis of the process camera and arrive at conclusions which standardises the hitherto empirical practices at process work.’

Experimentations began immediately and the firm's reputation was aided by its owners contribution to his chosen field. Starting in 1897, Upendrakishore wrote a number of articles in the best-known British printing journal of the time, Penrose Annual, based on his researches. Their titles, though technical, are self-explanatory: 'Focussing the Screen' (1897), 'The Theory of the Half-Tone Dot' (1898),'The Half-Tone Theory Graphically Explained' (1899), 'Automatic Adjustment of the Half-Tone Screen' (1901), 'Diffraction in Half-Tone' (1902–3), 'More About the Half-Tone Theory' (1903–4), 'The 60° Cross-Line Screen' (1905–6), 'Multiple Stops' (1911–12). Upendrakishore's papers about the diaphragm systems, his invention of the sixty-degree screen, his original methods of colour reproduction, his studies in diffraction and his contributions towards standardising half-tone camera work were all intimately connected with the progress of the photographic method of reproducing illustrations. While Siddhartha Ghosh in his essay on Sukumar Ray's Abol Tabol tells us that Upendrakishore patented a gadget known as the 'automatic screen adjustment indicator' which was sold as an optional accessory to the Penrose company's process camera, Andrew Robinson quotes a Penrose Annual issue in which its London editor explains a lack of articles by Mr. U. Ray as an outcome of ill health and further informs the printing trade that U. Ray had anticipated by some years the important screen just patented by someone in Britain' and that 'unable to prove his theory in Calcutta for lack of resources, Upendrakisore had appealed to his colleagues in Britain for help and one of them had plagiarised his ideas.

By 1910, the firm was undertaking 'original designs in black and white in colours for tables, books, magazines and catalogue illustrations, show cards, letterheads etc.'

== Sukumar Ray Going Abroad ==
The growth of the firm coincided to Upendrakishore's son Sukumar Ray going abroad on the Guruprasanna Ghosh Scholarship at Presidency College, Calcutta in 1911 to study at the London County Council School of Photoengraving and Lithography. An integral part of the firm, Sukumar was to take over the running of the press when his father fell ill and his knowledge and technical expertise regarding latest printing techniques, half-tones and multiple stops picked up at LCC and later at the School of Technology at the University of Manchester (where he took the City and Guilds of London Institute Examination and was awarded the first prize) stood him in good stead. Letters exchanged between father and son during this period explore the possibility of producing and patenting a colour camera. His return to Calcutta saw the firm advertising, stressing, among other things, 'the unique results of twenty years' experience and research and two years' intimate study of European methods'.

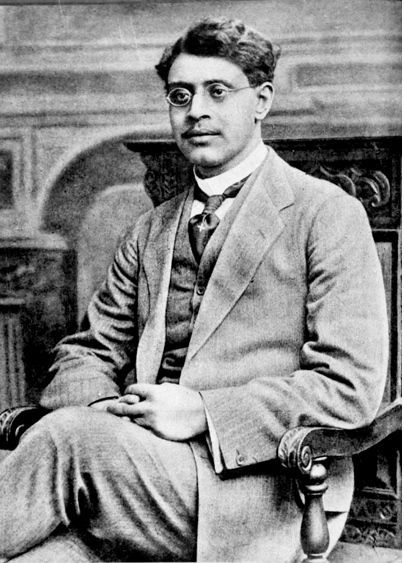
Sukumar Ray in London

Around the same time, when Ramananda Chatterjee's Prabasi (sister to the Modern Review) became the first ever periodical in Bengali to feature a reproduction of a photograph on its cover purely for the sake of illustration, the block was turned out by U. Ray and Sons and the photograph taken by Sukumar Ray.

== Publications ==
=== Tuntunir Boi or The Tailor Bird's Book ===
Although U. Ray and Sons started initially as a half-tone process firm and did not have a printing press of its own till 1913, it moved onto publishing in 1910 with its first book, written by Upendrakishore himself, a subsequent all-time Bengali classic Tuntunir Boi or The Tailor Bird's Book. Published by Sukumar Ray from Sukia Street it was printed by Haricharan Manna at the Kantik Press on Cornwallis Street and priced at 8 annas. Illustrated by line drawing sketches by the author it is a collection of twenty-seven folk tales for children. 'In his brief preface to the volume, Raychaudhuri writes of a story-telling habit prevalent among household women in certain parts of eastern Bengal [the author probably refers to Mymensingh which had been his desh or native region and a province particularly rich in folklore]. At the end of the day, when little children tend to drop off to sleep before having their suppers, affectionate nurses, mothers, aunts or grandmothers try to keep their sleepy-eyed wards amused with pleasing stories. The enchantment of the tales help keep the children diverted while the women feed them playfully. The tales of the book are drawn from that treasury of oral nursery lore, from a tradition steeped in the tenderness of motherly affection. The stories are short and entertaining – as would suit the patience and understanding of little folks - and peopled with a stock of native characters: the sprightly tailor-bird, the stupid tiger, the little sparrow, the wily fox, the clever cat, the hunch-back woman or the foolish weaver.'

Samples of the Title Page and Page 8 of the text show us how its form was.

=== Abol Tabol ===
Abol Tabol, an anthology of poems by Sukumar Ray, was first published in Sandesh magazine in parts. The book was first published on 10 September 1923, 9 days after the author's death. The book had a unique design – the book was bound at the top like a letter-writing pad.

== Illustrations ==
Here are some illustrations from the book Abol Tabol.

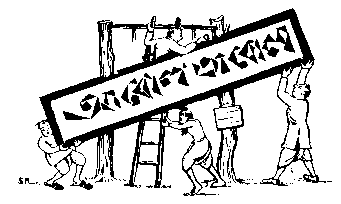
Aboltabol

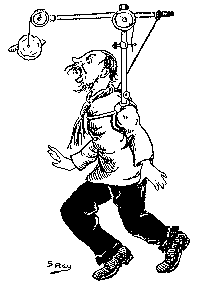
Khurorkal

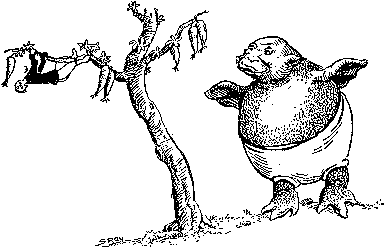
Kumropatash

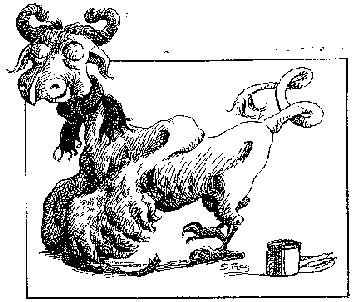
Tashgoru

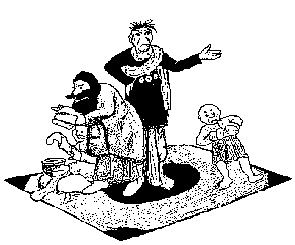
Daredaredroom

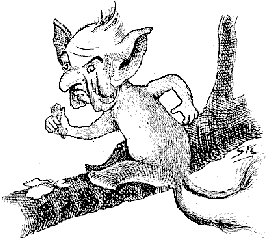
Hukomukhohangla

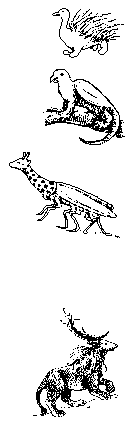
Khichuri 1

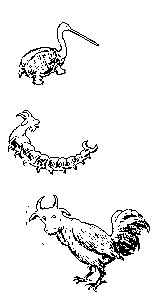
Khichuri 3

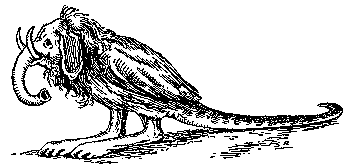
Kimbhut

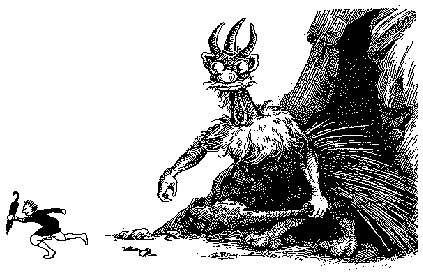
Bhoypeyona

=== Others ===
Besides the publications mentioned above, other works published include storybooks written by Kuladaranjan (Satyajit's uncle) and published by U. Ray and Sons who retold the Iliad and the Odyssey in Bengali, and a great many Indian legends and folk-tales; also corresponding with Arthur Conan Doyle's widow and obtaining the rights to translate his works into Bengali gratis. An early advertisement by the firm of such work can be seen here.

== Sandesh ==
Sandesh, first printed in 1913, was a monthly magazine published by Upendrakishore. Sukumar Ray was its editor. After Sukumar's death, the magazine was managed by a number of family members, chief among them Sukumar's brother, Subinay. The publication of Sandesh ended with when the firm collapsed. It was revived by Satyajit Ray in 1961.

== Relocation ==
A new chapter in the history of the firm began in 1913 when the family residence as well as the workshop and office of the firm were constructed at 100 Garpar Road according to Upendrakishore's design. The money for this came from selling most of his share in the zamindari at his ancestral home in Mymensingh to his foster brother Narendrakisore, who was in charge of it following his father Harikisore's death,’ records Andrew Robinson

This promoted the status of the firm from printers to publishers as well, with the printing of the first Sandesh. Much information can be got from grandson Satyajit Ray's recollections of this new press as recorded in Andrew Robinson's The Inner Eye.

‘[ Satyajit Ray's ] main memories of those earliest years revolved around his grandfather’s house-cum-press, U. Ray and Sons at 100 Garpar Road, and the relatives who occupied it. It stood in a peaceful road in north Calcutta with a deaf-and-dumb school on one side and a private school on the other which was no doubt typical of the crammers that Rabindranath Tagore tells us he spent his childhood years trying to escape in the 1860s and 70s. In the heat of midday, when Calcutta traffic of all kinds came to a stop, Satyajit would hear the chant of multiplication tables, of reading out loud and, sometimes, the shouts of angry masters. The building had three storeys and a fine flat roof, which Upendrakishore had used for his astronomy. The printing machinery was housed at the front of the building on the ground floor and directly above that were the block-making and typesetting rooms. The Ray family lived at the back on all three floors. To reach them, a visitor entered a small lane to one side of the house. A door gave on to stairs to the right which led to the family apartments; those turning left were on press business. Satyajit was fascinated from the beginning by the whole paraphernalia of printing, particularly as one of its end products was Sandesh with its three-colour cover. He became a frequent visitor to the first floor. As he entered, the compositors, sitting side by side in front of their multisectioned Type cases, would glance up at him and smile. He would make his way past them to the back of the room – to the block-making section with its enormous imported process camera, and its distinctive smells. 'Even today,’ wrote Ray in 1981, 'if I catch a whiff of turpentine, a picture of U. Ray and Sons' block-making department floats before my eyes.' The main operator of the camera, Ramdohin, was his friend. He had had no formal education; Upendrakisore had trained him from scratch and he was like one of the family. Presenting Ramdohin with a piece of paper with some squiggles on it, Satyajit would announce: 'This is for Sandesh.' Ramdohin would solemnly wag his head in agreement, 'Of course, Khoka Babu, of course' and lift Satyajit up to show him the upside-down image of his drawing in the screen of the camera. But somehow it would never appear in Sandesh.’

== Print Samples ==
Expertise in photo processes meant that U. Ray and Sons produced the best colour plates in Calcutta during its existence. Examples to be found include the colour plates in Ramananda Chatterjee's Picture Albums - The Mendicant, Ahalya, Gandhari.

== Liquidation ==
After Sukumar Ray's death the control of the firm passed into the hands of his brother Subinay Ray. The collapse of U. Ray and Sons in 1926 was the result of impracticality on the part of Sukumar's brother Subinay who had been managing it, combined with disloyalty by some of the staff Upendrakisore had trained. No one now quite knows. Sound business planning was never one of the priorities of Upendrakisore and his direct descendants, though each demonstrated an ability to combine quality with commercial viability. In the case of Satyajit, he was emphatically not interested in business for its own sake. The firm was finally wound up in January 1927 and the family house built by Upendrakisore passed into the hands of the more reasonable of the creditors.
