= Khagendranath Mitra =

- Born: 2 January 1896; Shyampukur, Calcutta, Bengal Presidency, British India
- Died: 12 February 1978 (Age 82); Calcutta, West Bengal, India
- Occupation: Children's writer

Khagendranath Mitra (1896–1978) was an Indian writer known for his Bengali language children's literature.

== Early life ==
Mitra was born in Calcutta (now Kolkata). He hailed from the Mitra family of Nilmani Mitra Street, Kolkata (West Bengal, India). His father Shailendranath Mitra was a Mukhtar of Tagore family estate in Shilaidaha, Bengal Presidency (now in Bangladesh). In school life at Kushtia District he became attracted with revolutionary politics and attached with Bagha Jatin. Mitra also joined in Non-cooperation movement in his youth and became imprisoned before the independence.

== Overview ==
He was the first Indian children's writer whose books were translated into foreign languages. The Russian translation of Bhombol Sardar was of immense popularity. Bhombol Sardar was one of the Rapid Text in Russian junior classes.

Mitra, besides writing more than 100 books, was an editor as well. Kishor [কিশোর] (The Preteens), the first child periodical in Asia was the brain child of his, though it was not published for a year. Notun Manush [নতুন মানুষ] (New Man), Chhotoder Mohol [ছোটদের মহল] (The Gallery for Children), Banshory [বাঁশরী] (The Flute), Sonar Kathi [সোনার কাঠি] (The Golden Stick), Shishusathi [শিশুসাথী] (The Children's Friend; Annual) were among the periodicals he edited.

== List of works ==
=== Stories ===
- Moutuski [মৌটুসকি]
- Sei Chhokrata [সেই ছোকরাটা] (That Lad)
- Kopaler Lekha [কপালের লেখা] (The Fate)
- Swapne Paoya Golpo [স্বপ্নে পাওয়া গল্প] (The Story Obtained in a Dream)
- Kortababur Petni Dekha [কর্তাবাবুর পেত্নী দেখা] (The Female-Ghost Kortababu Saw)
- Mintur Chhobi [মিন্টুর ছবি] (Mintu's Picture)
- GoneshChandrer Ashubho Jatra [গণেশচন্দ্রের অশুভ যাত্রা] (The Unholy Journey of GaneshChandra)
- Parghater Alapeer Pallay [পারঘাটের আলাপীর পাল্লায়] (The Gossiping Man of Parghat)
- Chorer-o Adhom [চোরেরও অধম] (Even Inferior Than a Thief)
- Badanpur Bungalowr Sei Rat [বদনপুর বাংলোর সেই রাত] (That Night At Badanpur Bungalow)

=== Novels ===
- Bagdi Dakat [বাগদী ডাকাত] (The Bagdi Bandits)
- Africar Jongole [আফ্রিকার জঙ্গলে] (In the Forests of Africa. Inspired by R.M Ballantyne's novel The Gorilla Hunters)
- Sundarbaner Pothe [সুন্দরবনের পথে] (On the Way to Sundarban)
- Black Arrow [ব্ল্যাক অ্যারো]
- Bhombol Sardar [ভোম্বোল সর্দার] (Bhombol the Leader), in 4 volumes- This is a fascinating account of life of a preteen village boy, Bhombol. Perhaps, this is a nostalgic memory of his own childhood.
- Pujoneeyo Dosyu [পূজনীয় দস্যু] (Adorable Dacoit)- Prohelika Series [প্রহেলিকা সিরিজ] of Deb Sahitya Kutir
- Dakait Omnibus - Stories of Bishe Dakait (Biswanath Sardar) and other decoits of rural Bengal

== Adaptation ==
Bhombol Sardar was turned into a verbal drama conducted by Akashbani, the governmental radio network in India. It was also adapted to a Bengali movie.

== Awards ==
Khagendranath Mitra received many awards such as Bhubaneshwasi Padak (Medal) and Mouchak Sahitya Purashkar from University of Calcutta for his works. He also awarded Girish Silver Medal. In 1975 his name was nominated for National award in literature but since the authority showed dishoner to the child literutre, he refused to receive it.

== See also ==
- Sukumar Ray
- Ashapoorna Devi
- Premendra Mitra
- Leela Majumdar
- Satyajit Ray
- Narayan Gangopadhyay
- Shibram Chakraborty
- Narayan Sanyal
- Dhirendralal Dhar
- Dinesh Chandra Chattopadhyay
