= Natyoshala =

Drama-related non-profit org in India

Natyoshala, is a unique Indian drama related non-profit organisation. It is the brain child of some Bengali drama enthusiasts. It is supported by many people from all the parts of the world including North America, Asia, and Europe. It is a collective initiative, which provides the unique setting to share one's act(s) either as a solo artist or in a group with other drama enthusiasts. It aims to bring together people who share enthusiasm in drama either as a playwright, actor, director, producer, music composer or in any other role, regardless of any geographical or language barrier.

== Web portal ==
It is associated to a web portal whose goal is to provide a platform to practice and develop modern plays for everyone. The significance of such a web portal lies in the fact that while there are quite a few online resources about Bengali Theatre or Bengali drama, there are hardly any resources for amateur/non-professional drama enthusiasts. The preliminary goal of Natyoshala is to cater to the need of that group of people apart from spreading the message of Bengali drama to a wider audience.

=== Features ===
The prominent features of Natyoshala portal are

- The most popular feature is an open source drama script repository. It contains mostly Indian drama scripts which are not under copyright protection. These include Rabindranath Tagore play collection and Sukumar Ray play collections. Some of the scripts that are under copyright protection are presented there with the permission of the copyright owner. Anyone can download any of these free drama scripts for performing in an upcoming event.
- Kolkata Corner where one can get the information about the recent plays being performed in Kolkata. Anybody, who wants the performance of a drama group to be posted here, may contact Natyoshala directly. Recently, it is announced that Natyoshala will have an international drama news section also. In this section one will get the recent news of theaters around the world.
- One can submit the drama performance report or one can write original review of a play
- One can listen to or post one's own creative audio plays. Recently, Natyoshala has started allowing registered users to download selected audio plays in MP3 format.

== Productions ==
- Mukhosh (2010)
- Adbhuture (2009)
- Majhipurer Itikotha (2008)
- Ekti Avastob Golpo (2008)
- Patale Papokhoi (2007)

Natyoshala produces both original dramas and plays based on adapted scripts from existing literature. These scripts can be used by anybody for non-commercial purpose. Dramas of Natyoshala have been staged in Chicago, Ontario, Ireland, and New Delhi.
