= Biswanath Sardar =

Bengali revolt leader

Biswanath Sardar (? – 1808) was a leader of the Indigo revolt in the Bengal. He was popularly known as Bishe Dakaat.

== Revolt ==
The first phase of revolts in Eastern British India started in the early part of the nineteenth century. Biswanath Sardar led the rebellion in Jessore, Nadia and 24 Parganas. The indigo planters forced the peasants to plant indigo instead of food crops. They provided loans, called dadon, at a very high interest. Subsequently, the farmer remained in debt for his whole life before passing it to his successors. The price paid by the planters was meager, only 2.5% of the market price. Sardar organized the Peasant movement, made first notable resistance against the treatment of Nil Kar (Indigo planters) and started looting the estate of planters one by one. He did not even spare the residence and factory of Indigo planters. First he attacked in Santipur Nilkuthi, afterwards robbed numbers of Kuthis in Khalboalia, Shikarpore, Banshberia, Nischintapur villages. At midnight on 27 September 1808 the peasant rebels surrounded the estate of Samuel Faddy, a planter. Sardar set fire and destroyed the estate but freed Faddy. This incident terrorized all the indigo planters and police sought to arrest Sardar.

== Death ==
A few months after the attack on Faddy's residence, Police head Mr. Eliot and Mr. Blaquiere, the District Magistrate of Nadia arrested Sardar. He was hanged in Assannagar village after a show trial. The police declared him an outlaw but he had a Robin Hood like heroic image to the poor farmers. Sardar was known as Babu Biswanath as well as the first martyr of Indigo revolt in India.

== Popular culture ==
There are numerous tales of his actions. Bengali writer Khagendranath Mitra wrote series stories of Bishe Dakait (Decoit). Dhirendralal Dhar portrayed him as great revolutionary in his book Nilkar Elo Deshe.
