= Dhirendralal Dhar =

Bengali writer

Dhirendralal Dhar (12 January 1913 – 20 September 1991) was a Bengali writer. In 1979, he received the Indian National Award for his contributions to Children's literature. His pen name was Shridhar Munshi.

== Early life ==
Dhar was born in Kolkata in British India. He studied in Ariya Mission Institution and then in Vidyasagar College. He worked as a part-time journalist and teacher. In 1928, Dhar joined the Non Co-Operation movement and the Indian National Congress. After that he joined the youth organisation of Hindu Mahasabha.

== Literary career ==
Dhar's first published work is Mrityur Poschate in 1934. He was popular for historical, adventure, horror and detective stories or novels specially for children. He edited child magazines like Shishu Pratibha (1955), Ahoroni (1957), Anondo Pujabarshiki (1964–69) and Kishore Granthabali. Apert from these works, he also wrote some novels for adults. Nalanda Theke Lumbini, Kasmira, Pannagarh were his well known novels in Bengali literature. He wrote serious biographies on Subhaschandra Bose, Vidyasagar and Dr. B.R. Ambdekar.

== Works ==
- Adventure Omnibus
- Amar Desher Manush
- Asi Baje Jhan Jhan
- Desh Bidesher Rupkotha
- Durbine Duniya
- Ei Desheri Meye
- Galpo Holeo Satyi
- Joydev
- Juddher Golpo
- Maha Chine Mahasamar
- Mandire Mandire
- Mohakal
- Mohakaler Pujari
- Nalonda Theke Lumbini
- Nilkar Elo Deshe
- Paschim Digante
- Priyadarshi Ashok
- Rongmohol
- Sipahi Juddher Golpo

== See also ==
- Akhil Niyogi
- Ashapoorna Devi
- Khagendranath Mitra
- Leela Majumdar
- Narayan Gangopadhyay
- Premendra Mitra
- Shibram Chakraborty
- Sukumar Ray
