= Baba Saheb Ambedkar Education University =

University in West Bengal, India

- Former names: West Bengal University of Teachers' Training, Education Planning and Administration (WBUTTEPA)
- Motto: Excellence in Teacher Education
- Type: Public
- Established: 2015 (11 years ago)
- Academic affiliations: UGC
- Budget: ₹1.0332 crore (US$110,000) (2021–22 est.)
- Chancellor: Governor of West Bengal
- Vice-Chancellor: Arunasis Goswami
- Location: Kolkata, West Bengal, India; 22°31′49″N 88°21′22″E
- Campus: Urban
- Website: bsaeu.in

Baba Saheb Ambedkar Education University, formerly known as West Bengal University of Teachers' Training, Education Planning and Administration (WBUTTEP&A), was established by an Act of the West Bengal legislature published in the Kolkata Gazette, Extraordinary, 16 January 2015. This is the first university in India set up by any State Government exclusively for training teachers. The university was established in 2015 and Prof. Mita Bandhopadhyay became the first Vice Chancellor. It offers different teacher's training courses (B.Ed. and M.Ed.) at the undergraduate and postgraduate level. The courses are approved by National Council for Teacher Education. It has 200 teachers' training colleges affiliated to its jurisdiction and its horizon encompasses the entire state of West Bengal.

On 27 June 2022, Govt of West Bengal changed the present name of the university from WBUTTEPA to Baba Saheb Ambedkar Education University, named after B. R. Ambedkar.

== Departments ==
B.Ed., M.Ed., Sports Science.

== Notable alumni ==
- Arijit Singh
- Rupam Islam
- Raja Mondal (Bishnupur) Nikhil Banga Sikshan Mahavidyalaya

== Notable faculty ==
- Nalini Das
