= Renu Chakravartty =

Indian politician (1917–1994)

Member of Indian Parliament
- In office 1952-1962
- Constituency: Basirhat
- In office 1962-1967
- Constituency: Barrackpore

Personal details
- Born: 21 October 1917 Calcutta, Bengal Presidency, British India
- Died: 16 April 1994 (aged 76)
- Party: Communist Party of India
- Spouse: Nikhil Chakravartty
- Children: 1 son
- Education: Victoria Institution, Kolkata, Newnham College, Cambridge

Renu Chakravartty (1917–1994) was a leader of Communist Party of India, noted parliamentarian and educationist.

== Early life ==
Born in a well-off Brahmo family to Sadhan Chandra and Brahmakumari Roy, at Kolkata on 21 October 1917, she was educated at Loreto House and Victoria Institution in Kolkata and Newnham College, Cambridge. After her graduation with honours at Kolkata, she acquired a tripos in English Literature at Cambridge.

A niece of Dr. Bidhan Chandra Roy, she was inspired to take interest in political affairs by him. In 1938, she came in contact with Rajani Palme Dutt, the notable British communist, and joined the Communist Party of Great Britain. On return to India, the same year, she secured membership of the illegal Communist Party of India and plunged into active left politics.

== Marriage and politics ==
She married eminent journalist, Nikhil Chakravartty, in 1942. In the early forties she taught English Literature in the University of Calcutta. Along with Rani Mitra Dasgupta and Manikuntala Sen she played an important role in the formation of Mahila Atma Raksha Samiti. It later played a part in the Tebhaga movement. For the support of destitute women she was involved, along with her mother, in the Nari Seva Sangha. In 1948, when the Communist Party of India was declared illegal, she went into hiding.

She was elected to the Lok Sabha from Basirhat in 1952 and 1957, and from Barrackpore in 1962. After CPI split in 1964, she decided to remain with the older organisation, and in two successive elections in 1967 and 1971 she was defeated from the same constituency by Md. Ismail of Communist Party of India (Marxist).

Gopalkrishna Gandhi has summed up very succinctly, the era in which Renu Chakravartty served in the Indian Parliament: "The early Lok Sabhas and Rajya Sabhas more than rose to the standards of "daily assessment" set by Dr. Ambedkar, especially in MPs' stellar debating contributions. The lyrically thoughtful Nehru was matched by the rasping Kripalani. The Houses were well-served by the laser-eyed Feroze Gandhi, the fiery Bhupesh Gupta, the impassioned Hiren Mukherjee, the sedate Lakshmi Menon, the thermal Violet Alva, the acerbic Rammanohar Lohia, the excoriating Barrister Nath Pai, the striking Renu Chakravartty, the diligent Minoo Masani, the startling C.N. Annadurai, and, of course, the poetic Atal Bihari Vajpayee."

In around four decades of political life she was active in the workers' movement, organised many strikes and was sent to jail on numerous occasions. She was a vibrant contributor to the women's movement. She was on the executive committees of many organisations, including the Women's International Democratic Federation's to which she was elected in 1953.
