= Sumanyu Satpathy =

Indian academic

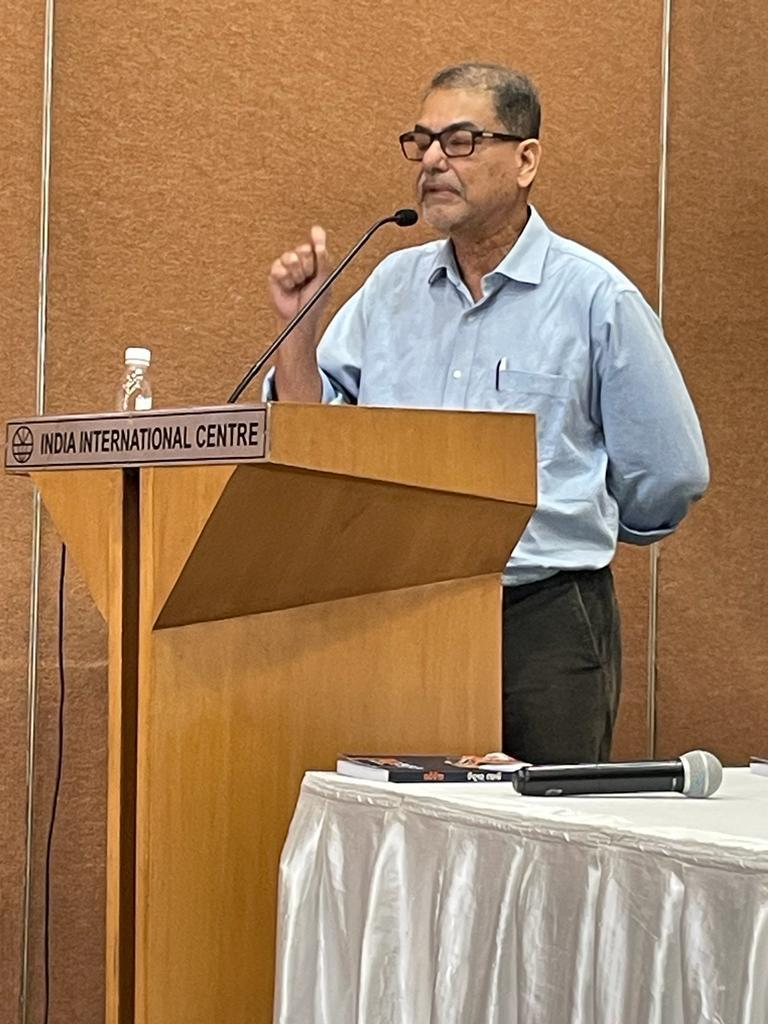
Sumanyu Satpathy at a Sahitya Akademi event, 2024.

Sumanyu Satpathy (Odia: ସୁମନ୍ୟୁ ଶତପଥୀ) is an Indian academic, who has taught at the Delhi University, New Delhi and North-Eastern Hill University, Shillong. Before taking up his current affiliation at KR Mangalam University as Professor of Eminence, Satpathy was Professor and chair at the Department of English, University of Delhi; Fellow at the Indian Institute of Advanced Study, Rashtrapati Nivas, Shimla; and Distinguished Fellow at the Michael J Osborne Institute of Advanced Studies, La Trobe University. As a visiting professor, he has taught at the University of Granada, Spain; Jamia Millia Islamia, Frankfurt University, Germany; Exeter University, England and La Trobe University, Melbourne, Australia among several others. His notable works include Modernity, Print and Sahitya: The Making of a New Literary Culture, 1866-1919, Reading Literary Culture: Perspectives from Orissa and Will to Argue: Studies in Late Colonial and Post-colonial Controversies.

== Articles ==
Satpathy has contributed many articles to several Indian and International journals and edited volumes. He is a contributor to the highly acclaimed Same-sex Love in India (eds Ruth Vanita and Saleem Kidwai, Palgrave 2002); and Children’s Literature and the Fin-de-siecle, Ed Roderick McGillis. He is the lead writer of the Indian chapter of the multi-volume Alice in Wonderland publication as part of the 150-year celebration of Alice translations curated and edited by Jon Lindseth of the Lewis Carroll Society of North America.

== Books and Anthologies ==
Satpathy has co-edited Natabar Samantaray: A Reader (Sahitya Akademi, 2017); The Tenth Rasa: An Anthology of Indian Nonsense (Penguin, 2007), and Signifying the Self: Women and Literature (Macmillan, 2 nd Edn. 2019). In 2007, he edited Voyage Out: An Anthology of Oriya Women’s Short Stories, (Rupantar, 2007). He co-edited Signifying the Self: Women and Literature (Macmillan, 2004), a collection of essays "that explores the multifarious expressions of feminism in India", along with Malashri Lal and Shormishtha Panja.

He is also the author of Re-viewing Reviewing: The Reception of Modernist Poetry in the Times Literary Supplement (1912-1932). A prolific translator, Satpathy translates from Indian languages, especially from Odia, into English.

=== Modernity, Print and Sahitya: The Making of a New Literary Culture, 1866-1919 ===
Satpathy's recent publication Modernity, Print and Sahitya: The Making of a New Literary Culture, 1866-1919 (Routledge, 2024) examines how Odia print culture evolved over time, exploring themes such as colonial modernity, linguistic identity, the history of books, canon formation, and emerging aesthetic forms. The book also explores the evolution of Odia literature within the diverse linguistic and territorial landscapes of Eastern India. Regenia Gagnier commented "Satpathy meticulously traces how adhunik Odia sahitya arises from famines and linguistic domination, modern machines and institutions, traditional aesthetic theory and practice, urban and especially rural contexts. Transcultural, decolonizing work at its finest."

=== Reading Literary Culture: Perspectives from Orissa ===
Published in 2009, Reading Literary Culture: Perspectives from Orissa offers a diverse collection of surveys, introductions, essays, reviews, and interviews, providing insight into key cultural figures, historical moments, and issues in the intriguing Indian region of Odisha. The book showcases how both traditional and contemporary Odia literature have been enriched by remarkable voices. It sheds light on the works of influential figures such as Sarala Das, Jagannath Das, Fakir Mohan Senapati, and others, demonstrating their significant cultural impact beyond just Odia or Indian literature, but on a global scale.

=== Southern Postcolonialisms ===
Satpathy edited Southern Postcolonialisms: The Global South and the 'New' Literary Representations (Routledge, 2018), a collection of critical essays on "new literary representations from the Global South that seeks to re-invent/reorient the ideological, disciplinary, aesthetic, and pedagogical thrust of Postcolonial Studies in accordance with the new and shifting politico-economic realities/transactions between the North and the South, as well as within the Global South, in an era of globalization."

=== Will to Argue: Studies in Late Colonial and Post-colonial Controversies ===
Will to Argue (Primus, 2017) explores the role of controversies in shaping culture, asking whether controversies can be considered a genre and if they offer valuable tools for understanding nationalism and identity formation. The author examines various controversies, ranging from language and khadi to sexuality and authorship, and discusses their impact on both local and national levels during colonial and post-colonial times. By analyzing figures like Sarala Das, Radhanath Ray, Tagore, Gandhi, and Premchand, the book provides insights into how controversies influence cultural imagination and identity construction.

His studies in Odia include, Tini Manjika: Eka Odia Nonsense Sankalana (Siksha Sandhan,2012); Priya JP: Jagannath Prasad Dasanku Chithi (Siksha Sandhan, 2012i; Bahudha: JP Dasanka Sankhipta Jiban. He has translated J P Das's collection of nonsense verse into English, Nanasense (National Book Trust, India, 2014).
