= Victoria Institution (College) =

Women's undergraduate college in Kolkata, India

- Type: Undergraduate women's college
- Established: 1932; 94 years ago
- Affiliations: University of Calcutta
- Academic affiliations: UGC, NAAC
- Principal: Dr. Maitreyi Ray Kanjilal
- Teacher-in-charge: Uma Ray Srinivasan
- Location: 78 B, A P C Road, Baithakkhana, Kolkata, West Bengal, 700009, India; 22.5747°N 88.3723°E
- Campus: Urban
- Website: www.victoriacollege.co.in
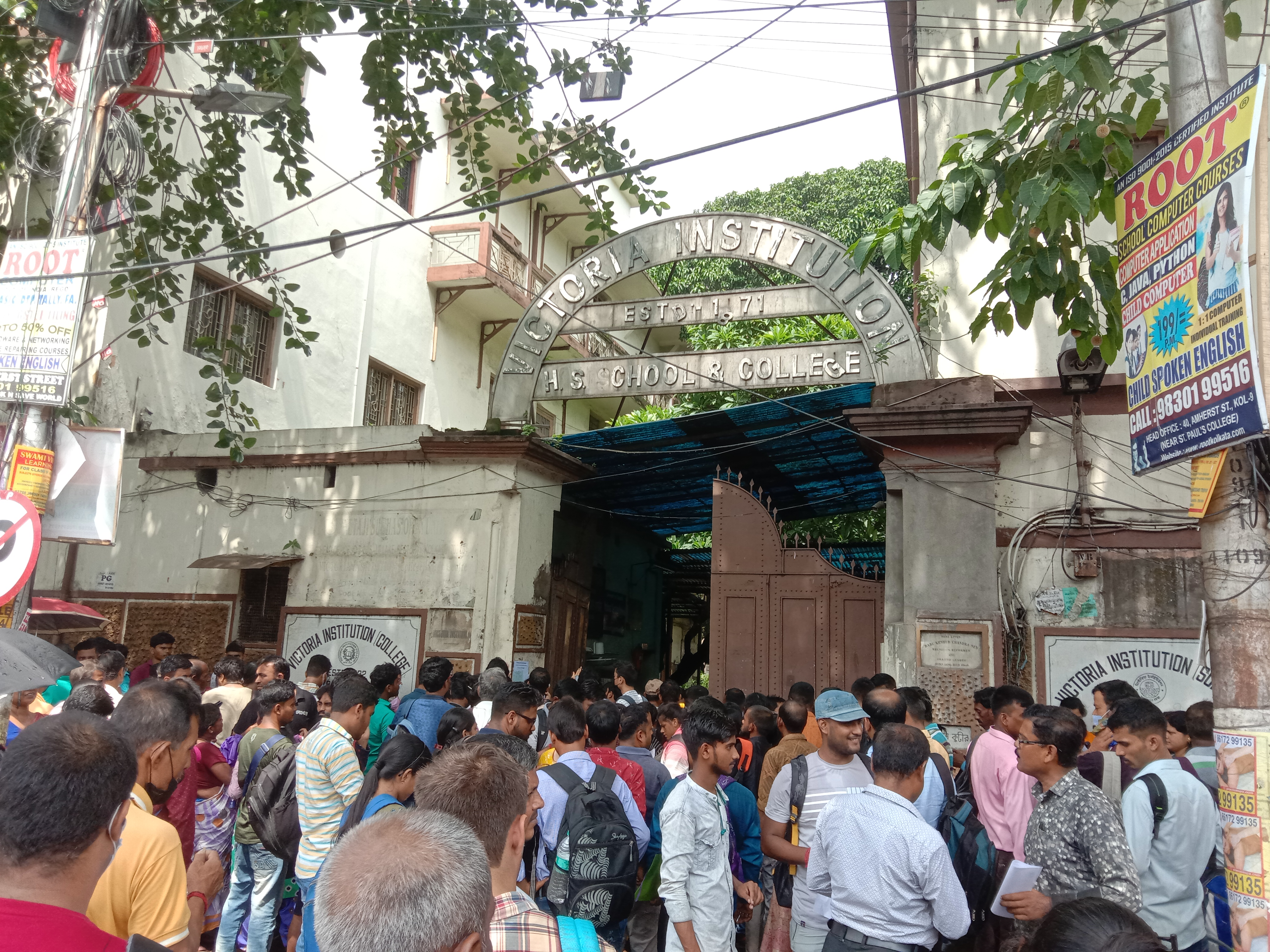
- Front view of the Victoria Institution (College), Sealdah (August 2022)

Victoria Institution (College), established in 1932, is one of the oldest undergraduate women's colleges in Kolkata, West Bengal, India. It is affiliated with the University of Calcutta.

== Departments ==
=== Science ===
- Chemistry
- Mathematics
- Psychology
- Physics
- Botany
- Zoology
- Geography
- Economics

=== Arts and commerce ===
- Bengali
- English
- Sanskrit
- Urdu
- History
- Political Science
- Philosophy
- Commerce

== Accreditation ==
The college is recognized by the University Grants Commission (UGC). In 2006, it was accredited by the National Assessment and Accreditation Council (NAAC), and awarded B grade, an accreditation that has since then expired.

== Notable alumni ==
- Renu Chakravartty
- Nurjahan Murshid

== Notable faculty ==
- Nalini Das

== See also ==
- List of colleges affiliated to the University of Calcutta
- Education in India
- Education in West Bengal
