= HaJaBaRaLa =

1921 children's novella by Sukumar Ray

HaJaBaRaLa (হ য ব র ল)
- Author: Sukumar Ray
- Illustrator: Sukumar Ray
- Cover artist: Sukumar Ray
- Language: Bengali
- Genre: Novella
- Publisher: 1st : U.Roy and Sons 2nd : Signet Press
- Publication date: 1921
- Publication place: India

HaJaBaRaLa (Bengali: হ য ব র ল), or HJBRL: A Nonsense Story, is a children's novella by Sukumar Ray. Ha Ja Ba Ra La is considered one of the best nonsense stories of Bengali literature. To highlight its genre, artistic merit and style, it is frequently compared to Alice In Wonderland.

== Plot ==
The story opens with the child narrator waking suddenly from sleep to find that a handkerchief places beside them before bed has transformed into a cat. The child starts talking to the cat, who speaks nonsensically about a handkerchief before disappearing over the hedge. Then the child finds Kakeshwar doing mathematical calculations on a slate, that appears very unusual to the narrator.

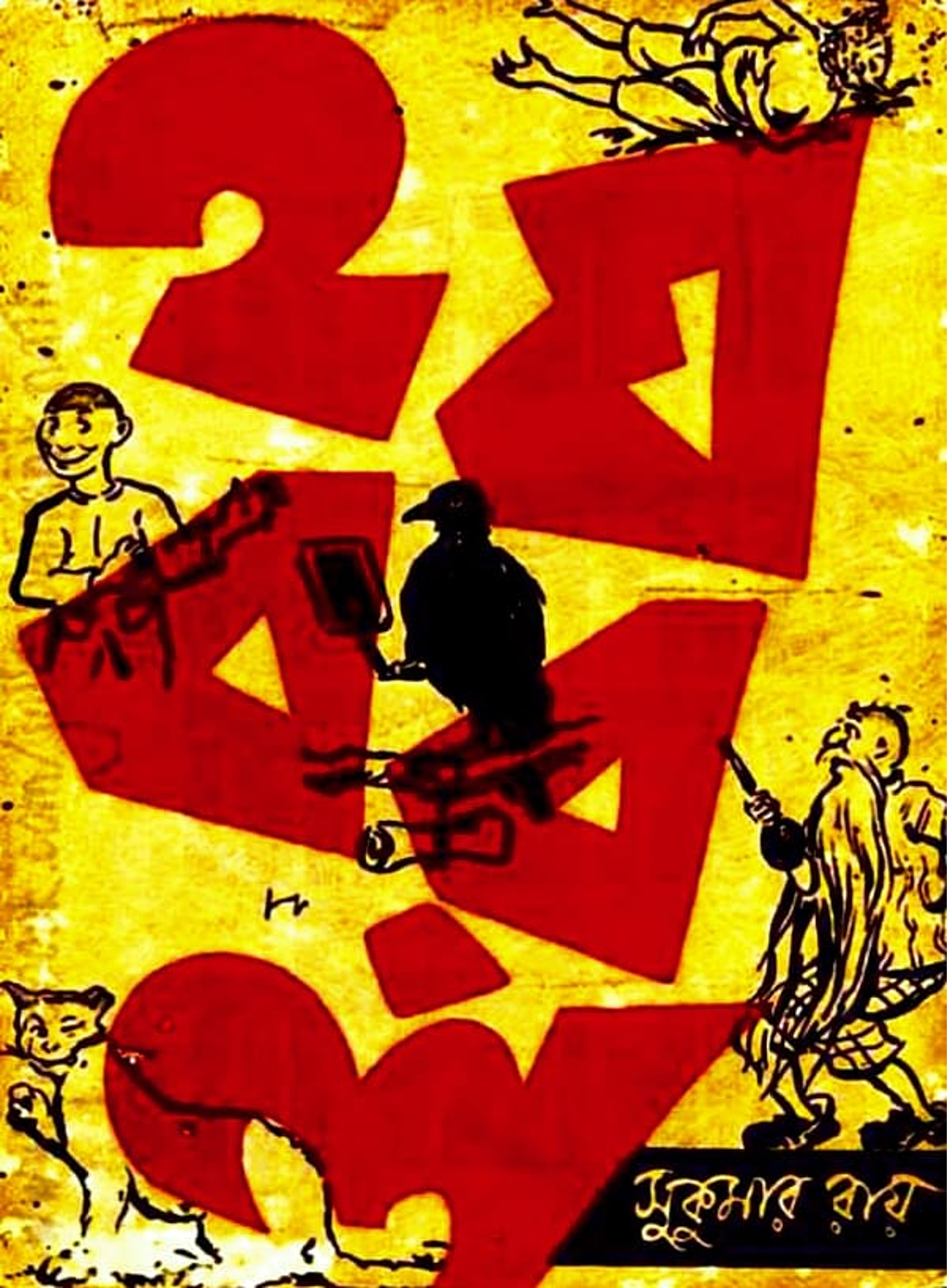
First Signet Edition of HA JA BA RA LA by Satyajit Ray

This includes multiplication that is purely illogical and fallacious. After arguing over math, a goat appears and narrates his life about eating paper and other artificial things. Hijibijbij appears and laughs hysterically at improbable situations and keeps changing his mind about the names of his family members. Then many animals appear, and confusion results. The child wakes up from their odd dream and finds the cat, which does not talk.

== Characters ==
Most of the characters have found idiomatic usage in Bengali language, which is true for many of Ray's works.

Some of the main characters are:

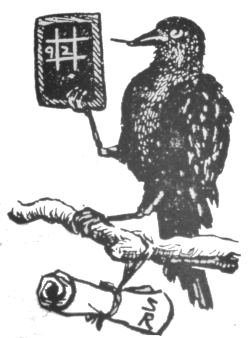
Shri Kakeswar Kuchkuche

Shree Kakkeshwar kuchkuche (Bengali: শ্রী কাক্কেশ্বর কুচকুচে)
A raven/crow who wears a clerk's green eyeshade while performing mathematics.

Gechhodada (Bengali: গেছোদাদা)
A character that is only alluded to by the cat but never appears in the story. he is completely unpredictable, and according to the cat, can only be found solving a very complicated, irrational and nonsensical mathematics, which depends on many probabilities about where Gechodada can be that moment.

Hijibijbij (Bengali: হিজিবিজবিজ)
A person who imagines very improbable situations and laughs at them.
Sheyal
The fox and the advocate against Kumir
Byakaran Shing BA Khadyabisharad (Bengali: ব্যাকরণ শিং বি,এ,খাদ্যবিশারদ)
A goat who delivers academic lectures on non-academic subjects, such as what goats do not eat.
Pyancha
The owl judge in the court

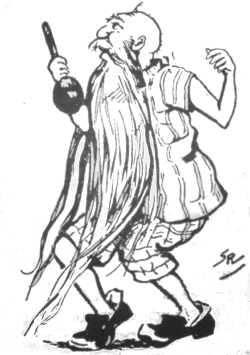
Udo

Udhho and Budhho (Bengali: উধো আর বুধো)
dwarf-like creatures who are fighting one moment and hugging the next. The phrase "Udhor pindi Budhor ghare", meaning (but not literally translated to) "the shoe is on the other foot", has become a very common idiom.
Shojaru
A porcupine who makes a court case for insult
Kumir
A crocodile, the advocate of Shojaru
Chondrobindu
A nonsense cat who speaks about nonsense things like gechodada (grandpa tree) and other people.
Nera (Bengali: নেড়া)
A person who has no hair. He loves to sing nonsense songs.
Gechhoboudi
Who does not appear in the story but is the wife of gechhodada who cooks
Mejomama
Maternal uncle who finds everything about the story nonsense.
