= Pagla Dashu =

Fictional Character

- Pagla Dashu character
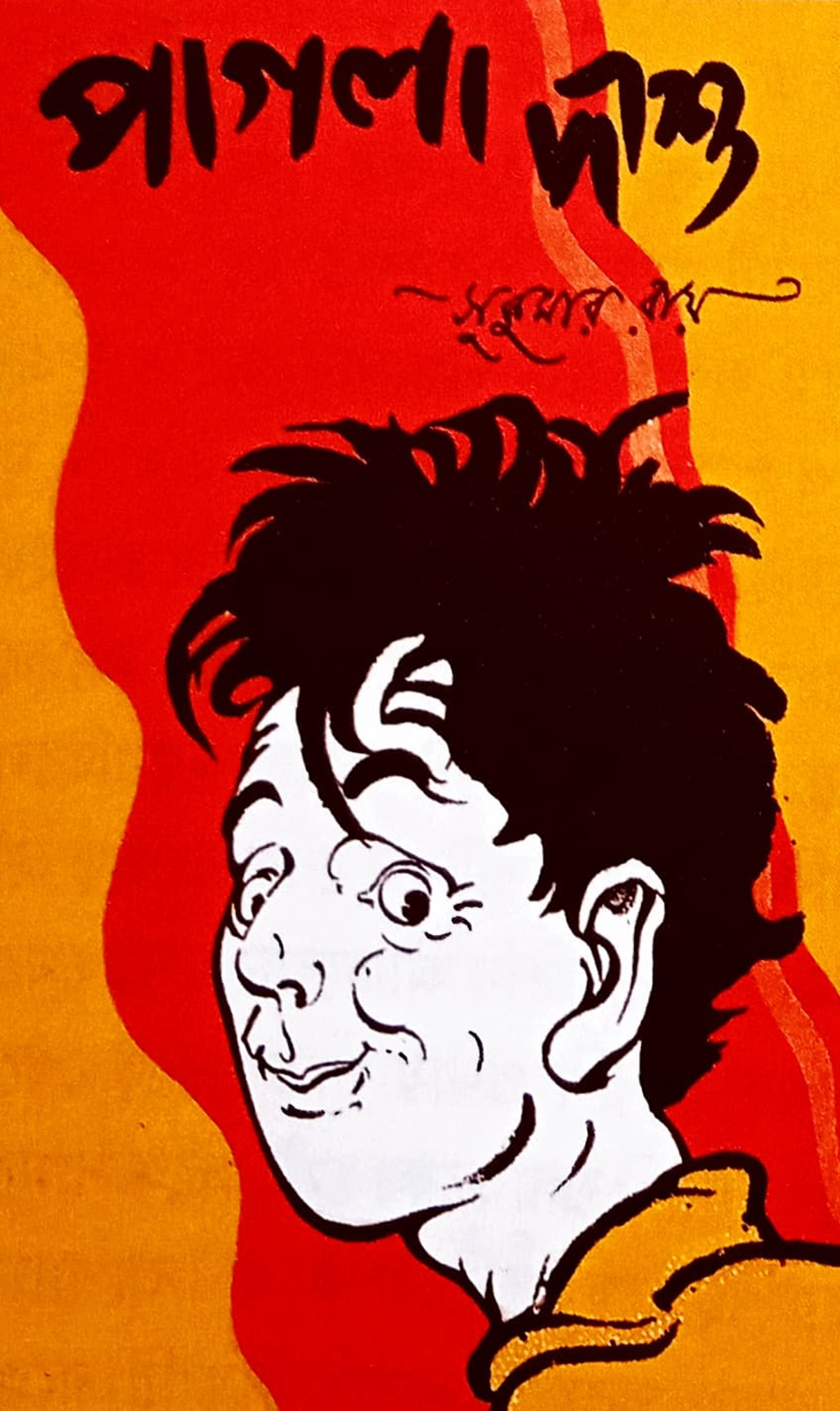
- Created by: Sukumar Ray

In-universe information
- Gender: Male

Pagla Dashu (Bengali: পাগলা দাশু; Crazy Dashu) is a fictional boy character created by Bengali writer Sukumar Ray. A collection of Pagla Dashu stories translated into English was published as The Crazy Tales of Pagla Dashu and Co in 2012.

== Characteristics ==
Pagla Dashu is a character appearing in several prominent works of Bengali literature from the early 20th century, most notably Pagla Dashu (1940). He is a school boy, and although he mainly acts like a maniac, he is famous for his crazy ideas and often inexplicable acts that carry subtle, comedic satire. Pagla Dashu stories are mainly for children, fun to read and creative.

Pagla Dashu has become one of the very popular characters of Bengali literature, like many other characters created by Sukumar Ray, a popular Bengali author of nonsense poetry.

== Translations ==
Pagla Dashu was translated from Bengali to Hindi by Lav Kanoi, a graduate student of Jadavpur University. It was published by the respected Hindi language publishing house Vani Prakashan in 2015.
