= Jagannath Prasad Das =

Indian Odia writer (1936–2026)

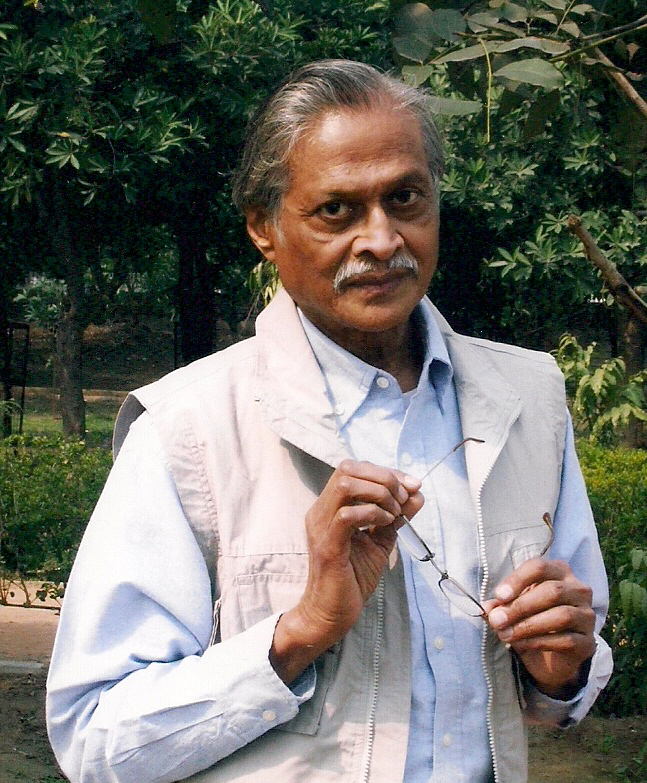
- Das in 2015
- Born: 26 April 1936; Puri, Orissa Province, British India
- Died: 3 June 2026 (aged 90); Bhubaneswar, Odisha, India
- Education: Utkal University; Allahabad University
- Occupations: Writer, poet, painter, playwright, novelist
- Writing career
- Pen name: J.P., J.P. Das
- Language: Odia, English
- Period: 1960s
- Genres: Poetry, short Stories, plays, novels, essays, art history, translation
- Notable works: English: Puri Paintings; Odia: Prathama Purusha, Parikrama, Desha Kala Patra, Suryasta Purbaru

Jagannath Prasad Das (26 April 1936 – 3 June 2026) was an Indian writer, poet, painter, playwright and novelist who wrote in Odia.

== Background ==
Jagannath Prasad Das was born on 26 April 1936 in Achyutarajpur Sasan village, in the Undivided Puri district of Odisha, into a humble Karan family. He was the third child of renowned author, educationist and translator Sridhar Das and Indu Devi. He studied at Mission School, Cuttack, and Ravenshaw College, and later earned a Master's degree in Political Science from Allahabad University, where he taught for a brief period.

He began his professional career as an Assistant Professor at the University of Allahabad before joining the Indian Administrative Service (IAS). He joined Administrative Service in 1958, during his administrative career, he held several positions in both the Government of Odisha and the Government of India. After taking premature retirement from government service in 1984, he settled in Delhi, where he remained actively involved in the city's cultural and social life.

Jagannath Das passed away on 3 June 2026 at the age of 90.

== Translations and editing ==
Besides translating some of his own work in Odia into English, he also translated other works in different languages into both Odia and English. He translated Odia Women Poets’ Work into English (with Arlene Zide), Catherine Clement’s poems from French into English (with the poet), Gulzar’s poems from Urdu into English, Swedish poet Werner Aspenstrom’s poems into Odia, a medieval Odia text Lakshmipurana into English and the poetry of Odia Dalit poet Basudev Sunani into English.

He edited the first-ever anthology of Odia Short Stories in English translation. He has edited an anthology of poetry from different Indian languages (with K.Satchidanandan), and a volume of essays, Films for Children.

== Fellowships ==
Das was awarded the following Fellowships for research and creative writing:

- Homi Bhabha Fellow (1979–1981) for research on Pata Paintings of Odisha
- Emeritus Fellow of the Ministry of Culture, Government of India (1994–1996)
- K. K. Birla Foundation Fellowship in Comparative Literature (1996–1998)

== Awards ==
- Vishuva Award from Pajatantra Prachar Samiti – 1976 and 1984
- Odisha Sahitya Akademi Award – 1975 (for Je Jahara Nirjanata)
- Sahitya Akademi Award – 1990 (for Ahnika). He did not accept the award.
- Sarala Award – 1998 (for Priya Vidushaka)
- Nandikar Playwright Award – 2000
- Saraswati Samman – 2006 (for Parikrama)

== Books by J. P. Das in Odia ==
=== Odia poetry ===
- Prathama Purusha – 1971
- Anya sabu Mrtyu – 1976
- Je Jahara Nirjanata – 1979
- Anya Desha Bhinna Samaya – 1982
- Jatrara Prathama Pada – 1988
- Ahnika – 1990
- Sthirachitra – 1991
- Sacharachara – 1994
- Smrtira Sahara – 1995
- Parikrama – 1998
- Asamaya – 2004
- Kabita Samagra – Ink Odisha, Bhubaneswar, – 2011

=== Odia Short Stories ===
- Bhavanatha O Anyamane – 1982
- Dinacharya – 1983
- Ame Jeunmane – 1986
- Sakshatkara – 1986
- Priya Bidushaka – 1991
- Shesha Paryanta – 1995
- Icchhapatra – 2000
- Indradhanu, Akhi O Kabitara Dirghajibana – 2009

=== Odia plays ===
- Suryasta Purbaru – 1977
- Saba Shesha Loka – 1980
- Asangata Nataka – 1981
- Purbaraaga – 1983
- Sundara Das – 1993

=== Odia novel ===
- Desha Kala Patra – Prachi Prakashan, Bhubaneswar, 1991

=== Children's literature (Odia)/nonsense rhymes ===
- Alimalika – Publication Division, Ministry of I and B, Government of India, 1993
- Alukuchi Malukuchi – Lark, 1993/Timepass, Bhubaneswar, 1993
- Anabana – Ink Odisha, Bhubaneswar, 2008
- Anamana – Timepass, Bhubaneswar, 2016

=== Translation into Odia ===
- Svapna-bichara – 2000

=== Anthologies of Poetry and Short Stories in Odia ===
- Chha'ti Jhia – 1987
- Premakabita (poetry) – 1991
- Shreshtha Kabita (poetry) – 1993
- Purbapara-1 (Samagra Kabita 1970–79) (poetry) – 1995
- Purbapara-2 (Samagra Kabita 1980–94) (poetry) – 1996
- Rangalipi – 1997
- Kathajatra (short stories)- 2000
- Kabita Samagra (poetry) – 2011
- Shreshtha Galpa (short stories) – 2014

== Books by J. P. Das in English ==
=== Research works ===
- Puri Paintings: The Chitrakara and His Work, Arnold-Heinemann, 1982
- Chitra-Pothi: Illustrated Palm-leaf Manuscripts, Arnold-Heinemann, 1985
- Palm-leaf Miniatures (with Joanna Williams), Abhinav Publications, 1991

=== Essays ===
- Reflections on Literature and Culture, Sikshasandhan, 2009

=== Works edited ===
- Oriya Short Stories, Vikas Publishing House, 1983
- Films for Children, Vikas Publishing House, 1987
- Kavita 93 (with K. Satchidanandan), Virgo Publications, 1993

=== Works translated ===
- Growing an Indian Star (with Catherine Clement), Vikas Publishing House, 1991
- Under a Silent Sun (with Arlene Zide), Vikas Publishing House, 1992
- Autumn Moon, Rupa Publishing House, 1999

== Books by Das translated into English ==
- First Person – Tr: Deba Patnaik, Arnold-Heinemann, 1976
- Love is a Season – Tr: Poet, Arnold-Heinemann, 1978
- Timescapes – Tr: Poet, Arnold-Heinemann, 1980
- Silences – Tr: Poet, Vikas, 1989
- Diurnal Rites – Tr: H. Panda, Sahitya Akademi, 1994
- The Unreal City – Tr: Durga P. Panda, Har Anand, 1997
- Lovelines – Tr: Poet with Paul St-Pierre, Virgo, 2001
- Alimalika – Tr: Poet, Writers Workshop, 2004
- Dark Times – Tr: Poet with Paul St-Pierre, Virgo, 2004
- Poems – Tr: Poet, Grassroots, 2004
- Nanasense – Tr: Sumanyu Satpathy, NBT, 2013

=== Short stories ===
- The Magic Deer – Tr: Author, Vikas, 1983
- The Forbidden Street – Tr: Author, Vikas, 1988
- Spider's Web – Tr: KK. & Leelawati Mahapatra, Vikas, 1990
- The Prostitute – Tr: Bibhuti Mishra and others, Har Anand, 1995
- The Pukka Sahib – Tr: Bikram K Das, Harper Collins, 2001
- Stories – Tr: Paul St-Pierre, Leela and K K Mahapatra, Grassroots, 2003
- Dear Jester – Tr: R K Swain and Paul St-Pierre, Rupa, 2004
- The Will – Tr: Ashok Mohanty, Sahitya Akademi, 2007

=== Plays ===
- Before the Sunset – Tr: Author, Arnold-Heinemnn, 1978
- Two Plays – Tr: Author, Writers Workshop, 1983
- The Underdog – Tr: Ravi Baswani, Vikas, 1984
- Absurd Play – Tr: Author, Writers Workshop, 1989
- Sundardas – Tr. Paul St-Pierre and others, NSD and Har Anand, 2002
- Miss X – Tr: Author, Rupa, 2002

=== Novel ===
- A Time Elsewhere – Tr: Jatindra K. Nayak, Penguin, 2009

=== Collections of his works by others ===
- J. P. Das Omnibus, Ed: Paul St. Peirre, Har-Anand, 2012
- Complete Plays, Ed: N. K. Bhattacharjee, Har-Anand, 2012
- Selected Short Stories, Ed: Mauricio Aguilera, Har-Anand, 2013
- Selected Poems, Har-Anand, 2014

== Books on J. P. Das ==
- Words on Canvas: J.P.Das and His Work – ed. Ganeswar Mishra (Orissa Lalit Kala Akademi, 2005)
- Srijan Jatra (Odia) – by Ganeswar Mishra (Vidyapuri, Cuttack, 2010)
- Priya JP (Odia) – ed. Sumanyu Satpathy (Shiksha Sandhan, Bhubaneswar, 2011)
- Jagannath Prasad: Bandhutara Aasara (Odia) – ed. Ganeswar Mishra (Timepass, Bhubaneswar, 2013)
- Bahudha (Odia) – by Sumanyu Satpathy, 2014
- "Bharatiyatara Anweshi JAGANNATH PRASAD DAS" (Odia) – Translated and Edited by Dr Rabinarayan Moharana (Lark Books, Bhubaneswar, 2014)
- "Mukhashala" (Odia) – Compiled and Translated by Dr Rabinarayan Moharana (Ink Odisha, Bhubaneswar, 2015)
- "JP JIBANEE" (Odia) – A biography of Dr Jagannath Prasad Das. The book is written by Dr Rabinarayan Moharana and has been published under the auspices of Utkal Sahitya Samaj, Cuttack and by M/s Jagannath Rath, Binod Bihari, Cuttack (Odisha). First Edition : 2019.
- "Jane JP Aneka Jeebana" (Odia)- A biography of JP, a multifaced literary person of Odisha. This book is written by Dr Rabinarayan Moharana and has been published by Pakshighara Prakashanee, Bhubaneswar. First Edition : 2021

== Sources ==
- Authorspeak, Sahitya Akademi, 2006, pages 105–110
- Going Through Hells, Muse India, Issue 5, Jan–Feb 2006
- The World of J.P.Das – by Sachidananda Mohanty, The Hindu, 4 March 2007
- JP Revisited – by Ashok Choudhury, Creative Mind, Vol V, 2008
- Out of Orissa – by Humra Quraishi, Sunday Tribune, 18 April 2010
- Taking Stock – by Suresh Kohli, The Hindu, 4 February 2012
- The Measure of Life – by Jitendranath Mishra, The Nation, Bangkok, 26 March 2012
- Indian Literature: An Introduction – Delhi University, page 315

=== Video ===
- Documentary on J.P.Das, Sahitya Akademi (30 minutes)
- Jaipur Literature Festival, 22 January 2011 (discussion on A Time Elsewhere)
- Think Literature, Bhubaneswar, 24 December 2013
