= Sandesh (magazine) =

Bengali children's magazine

- Sandesh June 1988 front cover
- Editor: Upendrakishore Ray, Sukumar Ray, Subinoy Roy, Sudhabindu Biswas, Satyajit Ray, Subhash Mukhopadhyay, Leela Majumdar, Nalini Das, Bijoya Ray, Sandip Ray, Sujoy Shome
- Categories: Children's magazine
- Frequency: Monthly (irregular in present time)
- Founded: 1913
- Country: India, Bangladesh
- Language: Bengali

Sandesh (Bengali: সন্দেশ, Shôndesh) is a centenary old Bengali children's magazine. It was first published by Upendrakishore Ray in 1913 through his publishing company, M/s U. Ray and Sons. The original partners of the venture were Upendrakishore and his sons Sukumar and Subinoy. Its publication had to be stopped twice. The current phase is the third and longest running one, spanning more than 60 years.

== Beginning ==
The magazine was first published from its office in 22, Sukea Street. Subsequently the office and the press were shifted to the new building built by Upendrakishore at 100, Garpar Road. Because of Upendrkishore's research and discoveries about printing technology (as many of his articles had been published in British printing journal of the time, Penrose Annual, based on his research), Sandesh had become the best children's magazine of India in no time, not only because of the quality of writing, but also the quality of printing and publishing. Upendrakishore's son Sukumar Ray went to Great Britain for advanced training in printing technology, and he joined as an active partner after his return.

After the death of Upendrakishore Roychowdhury in 1915, his eldest son Sukumar Ray succeeded as the editor of the magazine in 1915. Sukumar was known for his humorous writings. The Sukumar Ray years established Sandesh as a magazine that combined literary values with humour and information from different parts of the world. During Sukumar's time as editor, Sandesh also featured coloured photographs and poetries by well-known poets like Atulprasad Sen, Satyendranath Dutta and Kazi Nazrul Islam.

In 1923, after Sukumar's death, his younger brother Subinoy took charge of the magazine. He was a gifted writer, but he could not tackle the problems of a business facing a serious crisis. The business of U. Roy & Sons became insolvent and the publication of the magazine had to be stopped in 1925.

== First revival of the magazine ==
In 1929 it was revived by the publisher who had purchased the machinery of Upendrakishore's firm. Sudhabindu Biswas and Karunabindu Biswas, two former employees of U. Ray & Sons, acquired the company and revived Sandesh. Subinoy Ray and Sudhabindu Biswas became the joint editors in this period. This phase of the magazine is remarkable for the quality of the works published, including several contributions from Rabindranath Tagore and Dakshinaranjan Mitra Majumder. In 1934 the magazine again ceased publication.

== Second revival by Satyajit Ray ==
In 1961, the magazine was revived under the editorialship of Satyajit Ray, the film director (also the grandson of the founder Upendrakishore Ray and son of Sukumar Ray); and Subhas Mukhopadhyay, a poet. Many of Satyajit Ray's writings were first published in this magazine. One of his most famous stories for the magazine was "Bankubabur Bandhu" ("Banku Babu's Friend" or "Mr. Banku's Friend"), a Bengali science fiction story he had written in 1962 and which gained popularity among Bengalis in the early 1960s. Ray also introduced his characters Feluda and Professor Shonku in short stories he wrote for Sandesh.

In 1963, when the magazine faced a financial crunch, Satyajit Ray formed a non-profit literary co-operative, Sukumar Sahitya Samavaya Samity Ltd., with some like-minded friends and relatives, and this co-operative has since been running the magazine. Satyajit's aunt, the writer Leela Majumdar became the honorary joint editor of the magazine in place of Sri Subhas Mukhopadhyay. Upendrakishore's daughter Punyalata Chakraborty offered the magazine free accommodation at her house at 172/3, Rashbehari Avenue; and the magazine is even now operating from this address.

From 1974, Satyajit's cousin (and Punyalata's daughter) Nalini Das became honorary joint editor of the magazine. She was in effect the executive editor of the magazine from 1963, while her husband Asokananda Das was the honorary publisher. In 1992–93, the magazine faced a crisis when Satyajit Ray, Nalini Das and Asokananda Das all died within a period of 14 months. From 1994, Leela Majumdar also became too ill to be able to continue as the executive editor.

== From the 1990s ==
From 1993 to 1994, Sandip Ray, son of Satyajit Ray, became the joint editor of the magazine and Amitananda Das, son of Nalini Das became the publisher. However, the inexperienced team could not meet the challenge of the changing times, due to the competition from comics, cable television, and books with coloured illustrations. The total circulation of children's magazines dropped steadily in this period. Sandesh remained a black and white magazine, and it struggled, incurring losses and skipping issues.

== Special issues ==
Between 1995 and 2020, the special issues of Sandesh have become popular. In December 1995, the special issue "Feluda 30" (to commemorate thirty years of publication of the first-ever Feluda story in Sandesh) was extremely popular, that issue had to be printed a second time to meet the demand.

== Revival efforts ==
In 2003, The Ford Foundation gave a grant of rupees 22 lakhs to Sandesh to make the magazine viable. Due to administrative failure of the editorial team of the period, though the magazine had many coloured pages and was more attractive visually, it was not viable financially. Between July 2005 and April 2006, the magazine missed several issues, and after May 2006 it skipped four issues.

In August 2006, a new attempt was made to revive the magazine. Since then the magazine has been published somewhat irregularly. Every year the Saradiya annual number has over 300 pages, and the literary quality of the stories and other contributions are generally highly appreciated. Between 2011 and 2014, however, the office of the magazine had to be shifted to a temporary address, and the magazine could publish only three issues per year.

== Centenary year ==
2013 was the centenary year of the founding of the magazine by Upendrakishore Ray. It was also his 150th birth anniversary, since he started the magazine when he was 50 years old. The "Nababarsha" (Bengali New Year) special issue of Sandesh was published in the second week of May 2013, commemorating the 150th birth anniversary of Upendrakishore.

The 300-page Saradiya annual issue, scheduled to be published in September/October 2013, was to have a special section with articles about the centenary.

The centenary of Sandesh was celebrated from 28 to 31 December 2013 with a special exhibition held at "Nandan" and other functions including film shows. A special issue of Sandesh celebrating the centenary year was published in December.

== Latest status ==
Early in 2014, Sandesh returned to its office at 172/3, Rashbehari Avenue, Kolkata. Since then the regularity of publication has improved somewhat. Now one annual (Saradiya) issue of over 300 pages is published along with four other issues usually of 96 pages each. A series of recent special issues have been popular and the circulation of the magazine is increasing slowly. It was through Sandesh that new-age popular writers like Rajesh Basu came to the fore.

2017: The February 2017 issue had a Sonar Kella cover story and the April 2017 issue had a Narayan Gangopadhyay covers story.June issue was a special issue on Satyajit Ray's film "porosh pathor" (পরশ পাথর).The next issue was pujabarshiki (annual issue), had a special attraction named "

Now Sandesh is also available online from many vendors.
