= Anushka Ravishankar =

Indian writer

- Born: Nashik, India
- Occupation: Author
- Writing career
- Genre: Children's literature

Anushka Ravishankar is an author of children’s books and co-founder of Duckbill Books with Sayoni Basu.

== Early life ==
Ravishankar was born in Nashik, and graduated in mathematics from Fergusson College, Pune in 1981. While at college, she was influenced by the works of Lewis Carroll, Edward Lear and Edward Gorey. After completing her post-graduation in operations research, Ravishankar worked with an IT firm in Nashik for a while. She became a full-time writer after the birth of her daughter.

== Children's literature ==
Ravishankar sent her first few stories to Tinkle, a comic book published by Amar Chitra Katha. When two of these stories won a contest organised by the magazine, the publisher of Tinkle offered her a job, but Ravishankar could only freelance for Tinkle as she was staying home to care for her young daughter. When her family moved to Chennai in 1996, she was hired to be an editor at Tara Books, a children's publishing house in the city. There she authored Tiger on a Tree, a book of nonsense verse that was translated to Japanese, Korean and French. While the book only sold about 2500 copies in India, it sold over 10000 copies in the United States and over 7000 copies in France. She also worked as Publishing Director at Scholastic India.

She founded the Duckbill Publishing House in 2012 with Sayoni Basu. In 2019 Penguin Random House India acquired all book publishing assets of the company.

She is sometimes called the Indian Dr. Seuss.

== Writing style ==
While Ravishankar writes both picture books and chapter books, her specialty lies in writing nonsense verse for children. While her work does contain some nonsensical elements, it is not always pure nonsense. In her own words, "To Market! To Market! has a frame that is 'sensical', but the verse itself is quite nonsensical. I rely a lot on sound. Sometimes the sound takes you away from the meaning. Then, some of my books are really nonsense. Excuse Me, Is This India? is nonsense in the Carrollian sense."

A few of her books, like Catch that Crocodile!, Elephants Never Forget and Tiger on a Tree, were inspired by real-life events.

Ravishankar is also known to rewrite her verse on some occasions, after the illustrations are complete. She collaborates with artists from South Africa, Switzerland, Italy and India. While some of her books have an Indian flavour, most have a cross-cultural appeal.
