= Leela Majumdar =

Indian writer (1908–2007)

- Born: 26 February 1908; Calcutta, Bengal Presidency, British India
- Died: 5 April 2007 (aged 99); Kolkata, West Bengal, India
- Occupation: Writer
- Spouse: Sudhir Kumar Majumdar (m. 1934; died 1984)
- Children: 2
- Writing career
- Period: 1922–1994
- Genre: Children's books

Leela Majumdar (Bengali pronunciation: [lila mod͡ʒumdar]; née Ray; 26 February 1908 – 5 April 2007) was an Indian Bengali-language writer.

== Early life ==
Born to Surama Devi and Pramada Ranjan Ray (who was the younger brother of Upendra Kishor Ray Choudhuri), Leela spent her childhood days at Shillong, where she studied at the Loreto Convent. Surama Devi had been adopted by Upendra Kishor Ray Choudhuri. Lila's grandfather had left his younger two daughters in care of his friends after his wife died. The eldest daughter was sent to a boarding house. Her maternal grandfather was Ramkumar Bhattacharya, who later became a sannyasi and was christened Ramananda Bharati. He was the first among Indians to visit Kailash and Mansarovar and wrote a travelogue Himaranya. In 1919, her father was transferred to Calcutta, and she joined St. John's Diocesan School from where she completed her matriculation examination. She ranked second among the girls in the matriculation examinations in 1924. She stood first in English (literature) both in her honours (graduation) and Master of Arts examination at the University of Calcutta. The family she belonged to made a notable contribution towards children's literature. Sunil Gangopadhyay says that while the Tagore family enthused everybody with drama, songs and literature for adults, the Ray Chaudhuri family took charge of laying the foundations of children's literature in Bengali.

== Formative years ==
She joined Maharani Girls' School at Darjeeling as a teacher in 1931. On an invitation from Rabindranath Tagore she went and joined the school at Santiniketan, but she stayed only for about one year. She joined the women's section of Asutosh College in Calcutta but again did not continue for long. Thereafter, she spent most of her time as a writer. After two decades as a writer, she joined All India Radio as a producer and worked for about seven-eight years.

Her first story, Lakhi Chele, was published in Sandesh in 1922. It was also illustrated by her. The children's magazine in Bengali was founded by her uncle, Upendra Kishore Ray Chaudhuri in 1913 and was later edited by her cousin Sukumar Ray for some time after the death of Upendra Kishore in 1915. Together with her nephew Satyajit Ray and her cousin Nalini Das, she edited and wrote for Sandesh throughout her active writing life. Until 1994 she played an active role in the publication of the magazine.

== Creative efforts ==
An incomplete bibliography lists 125 books including a collection of short stories, five books under joint authorship, 9 translated books and 19 edited books.

Her first published book was Boddi Nather Bari (1939) but her second compilation Din Dupere (1948) brought her considerable fame from the 1950s, her incomparable children's classics followed. Although humor was her forte, she also wrote detective stories, ghost stories and fantasies.

Her autobiographical sketch Pak Dandi provides an insight into her childhood days in Shillong and also her early years at Santiniketan and with All India Radio.

Apart from her array of children's literature, she wrote a cookbook, novels for adults (Sreemoti, Cheena Lathan), and a biography of Rabindranath Tagore. She lectured on Abanindranath Tagore and translated his writings on art into English. She translated Jonathan Swift's Gulliver's Travels and Ernest Hemingway's The Old Man and the Sea into Bengali.

Satyajit Ray had thought of filming Podi Pishir Bormi Baksho. Arundhati Devi made it into the film Padi Pishir Barmi Baksha in 1972. Chhaya Devi played the role of the young hero, Khoka's famed aunt Padipishi.

For a special Mahila Mahal (women's section) series of All-India Radio, dealing with the "natural and ordinary problems" in the everyday life of a girl growing up in a typical, middle-class, Bengali family, she created Manimala, the story of a "very ordinary girl" whose grandmother starts writing to her from when she turns 12, continuing into her marriage and motherhood.

== Family ==
In 1933 she married Dr. Sudhir Kumar Majumdar (1897-1984), a renowned dentist who was a graduate of the Harvard Dental School. Their son Ranjan was a medical doctor and a dentist. Daughter Kamala was married to Monishi Chatterjee, an oil engineer and grandson of the first female painter of the Bengal school, Sunayani Devi. Apart from her children, she had, at the time of her death, two grandsons, two granddaughters and three great-grandchildren.

== Works ==
=== Juvenile Literature Books ===
1. Boddi Nather Bori (first published book, published in 1939)
2. Din Dupure (published in 1948)
3. Podi Pishir Bormi Baksho (published in 1953)
4. Holde Pakhir Palok (published in 1957)
5. Haati Haati (published in 1957)
6. Bagher Chokh (published in 1959)
7. Gupir Gupta Khata (published in 1959)
8. Bak Badh Pala (published in 1959)
9. Bok Dharmik (published in 1960)
10. Tong Ling (published in 1963)
11. Lanka Dahan Pala (published in 1964)
12. Haoyar Danri (published in 1964)
13. Maaku (published in 1968)
14. Nepor Boi (published in 1969)
15. Naaku Gama (published in 1973)
16. Batashbari (published in 1974)
17. Gunupanditer Gunapana (published in 1975)
18. Dulia (published in 1978)
19. Bhootor Diary (published in 1979)
20. Kaag Noy (published in 1981)
21. Sob Bhuture (published in 1983)
22. Gupi-Panu'r Keertikolaap (published in 1983)
23. Khonja (published in 1991)
24. Beraler Boi (published in 1996)

=== Books for Adults ===
1. Jonaki (published in 1958)
2. Sreemoti (published in 1958)
3. Cheena Lanthan (published in 1963)

=== Autobiography and Memoirs ===
1. Aar Konokhane (published in 1967)
2. Kheror Khata (published in 1982)
3. Pakdandi (published in 1986)

=== Biographies ===
1. Ei Ja Dekha (published in 1961)
2. Kabi Katha (published in 1961)
3. Upendrakishore (published in 1963)
4. Abanindranath (published in 1966)
5. Sukumar (published in 1989)

=== Cookbook ===
1. Rannar Boi (published in 1979)

=== Collection of letters ===
1. Manimala (published in 1956)

=== Other Works ===
1. Chhotoder Srestho Galpo
2. Taka Gaachh
3. Basher Phul
4. Moyna
5. Shalikh
6. Bhuter Bari
7. Aaguni Beguni
8. Tipur Upor Tipuni
9. Patka Chor
10. Aashare Galpo
11. Chiching Phank
12. Je Jai Boluk
13. Chhotoder Tal Betal
14. Batash Bari
15. Bagh Shikari Bamun
16. Baghyar Galpo
17. Shibur Diary
18. Howrahr Dari
19. Ferari
20. Ei Je Dekha
21. Moni Manil
22. Naatghar
23. Istkutum
24. Lal Neel Deslai
25. Megher Sari Dhorte Nari
26. Pori didir Bor
27. Pesha Bodol
28. Batash Bari
29. Monimala
30. Ilshe Ghai

== Awards ==
Holde Pakhir Palok won the state award for children's literature, Bak Badh Pala won the Sangeet Natak Akademi Award from the Government of India in 1963, Aar Konokhane won Rabindra Puraskar from the Government of West Bengal in 1969. She had also won the Suresh Smriti Puraskar, Vidyasagar Puraskar, Bhubaneswari Medal for lifetime achievement, and Ananda Puraskar. She has been awarded the Deshikottama by Visva Bharati, and honorary D.Litt. by Burdwan, North Bengal and Calcutta Universities.

== Legacy ==
In 2019, a documentary film has been made on Lila Majumdar entitled "Peristan - The World of Lila Majumdar".
