= Sukumar Ray =

Bengali poet, writer, and editor (1887–1923)

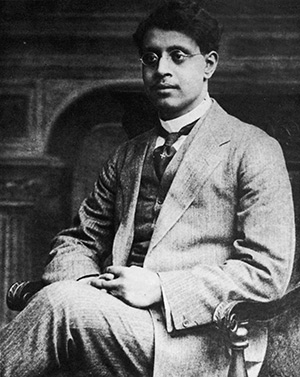
- Pronunciation: [ʃukumaɾ rae̯]
- Born: 30 October 1887; Calcutta, Bengal, British India
- Died: 10 September 1923 (aged 35); Calcutta, Bengal, British India
- Education: Presidency College; London County Council School of Photoengraving and Lithography; Manchester Municipal School of Technology
- Occupations: Writer, poet, editor
- Spouse: Suprabha Devi
- Children: Satyajit Ray (son)
- Parent: Upendrakishore Ray Chowdhury (father)
- Relatives: Dwarkanath Ganguly; Kadambini Ganguly
- Writing career
- Language: Bengali
- Period: Bengal Renaissance
- Notable works: Abol Tabol; Pagla Dashu; HaJaBaRaLa

Sukumar Ray (Note: Bengali: [ʃukumaɾ rae̯].) FRPS (Bengali: [ʃukumaɾ rae̯]; 30 October 1887 – 10 September 1923) was a Bengali writer and poet from British India. He is remembered mainly for his writings for children. He was the son of children's story writer Upendrakishore Ray Chowdhury and the father of Indian filmmaker Satyajit Ray.

== Family history ==
According to the history of the Ray family, one of their ancestors, Ramsunder Deo (Deb), was a native of Chakdah village in Nadia district of present-day West Bengal, India. In search of fortune, he migrated to the town of Sherpur, Sherpur district, in East Bengal. There he met Raja Gunichandra, the zamindar of Jashodal, at the zamindar house of Sherpur. King Gunichandra was immediately impressed by Ramsunder's stately appearance and sharp intellect and took Ramsunder with him to his zamindari estate. He made Ramsunder his son-in-law and granted him some property in Jashodal. From then on, Ramsunder started living in Jashodal. His descendants migrated from there and settled down in the village of Masua in what is now Katiadi Upazila of Kishoreganj District.

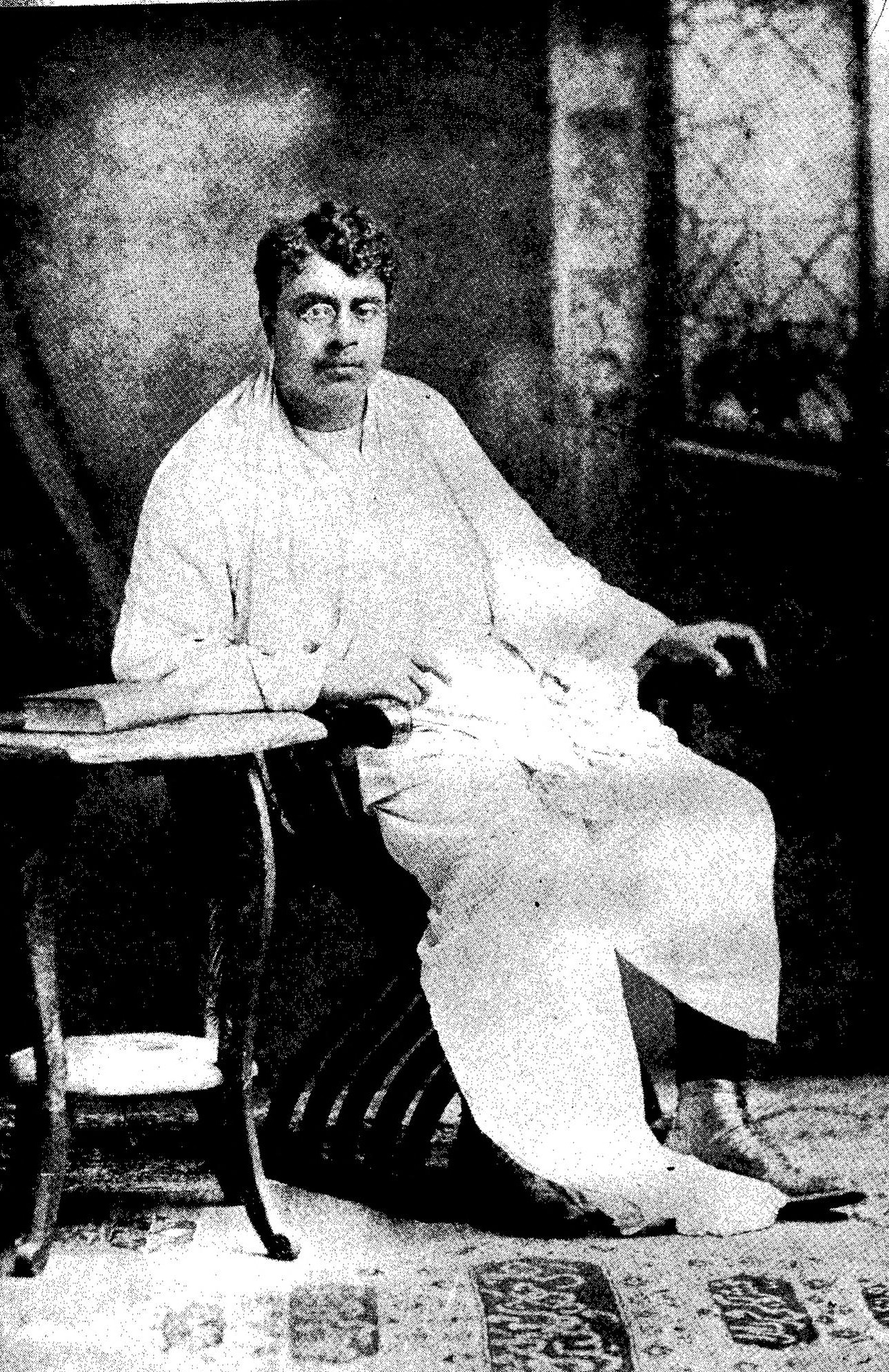
Sukumar Ray, Bengali writer and poet

== Early years ==
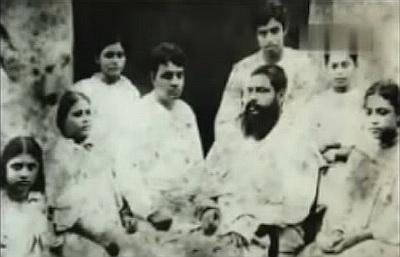
Sukumar Ray with his father, Upendrakishore Ray, mother Bidhumukhi, and five siblings

Sukumar Ray was born into a Brahmo family in Calcutta on 30 October 1887. His family hailed from Masua village of Kishorganj division of Eastern Bengal in British India (presently in Bangladesh). Sukumar's father, Upendrakishore Ray, was a famous Bengali writer, painter, violinist, and composer, technologist, amateur astronomer, and entrepreneur. Sukumar's mother, Bidhumukhi Devi, was the daughter of reformer Dwarkanath Ganguly.

Born in the era that can be called the pinnacle of the Bengal Renaissance, he grew up in an environment that fostered his literary talents. He befriended the likes of Jagdish Chandra Bose, Acharya Prafulla Chandra Ray, and one of his biggest influencers, his father's friend, Rabindranath Tagore. His father was a writer of stories and popular science; painter and illustrator; musician and composer of songs; a technologist and hobbyist astronomer. Upendrakishore was also a close friend of Rabindranath Tagore, who directly influenced Sukumar. Among other family friends were scientists Jagadish Chandra Bose, Prafulla Chandra Ray, composer Atul Prasad Sen etc. Upendrakishore studied the technology of blockmaking, conducted experiments, and set up a business of making blocks. The firm M/s U. Ray & Sons, where Sukumar and his younger brother Subinay were involved. His sister, Shukhalata Rao, became a social worker and children's book author. Like his father, Ray also had a close acquaintance with Rabindranath Tagore.

== Education and profession ==
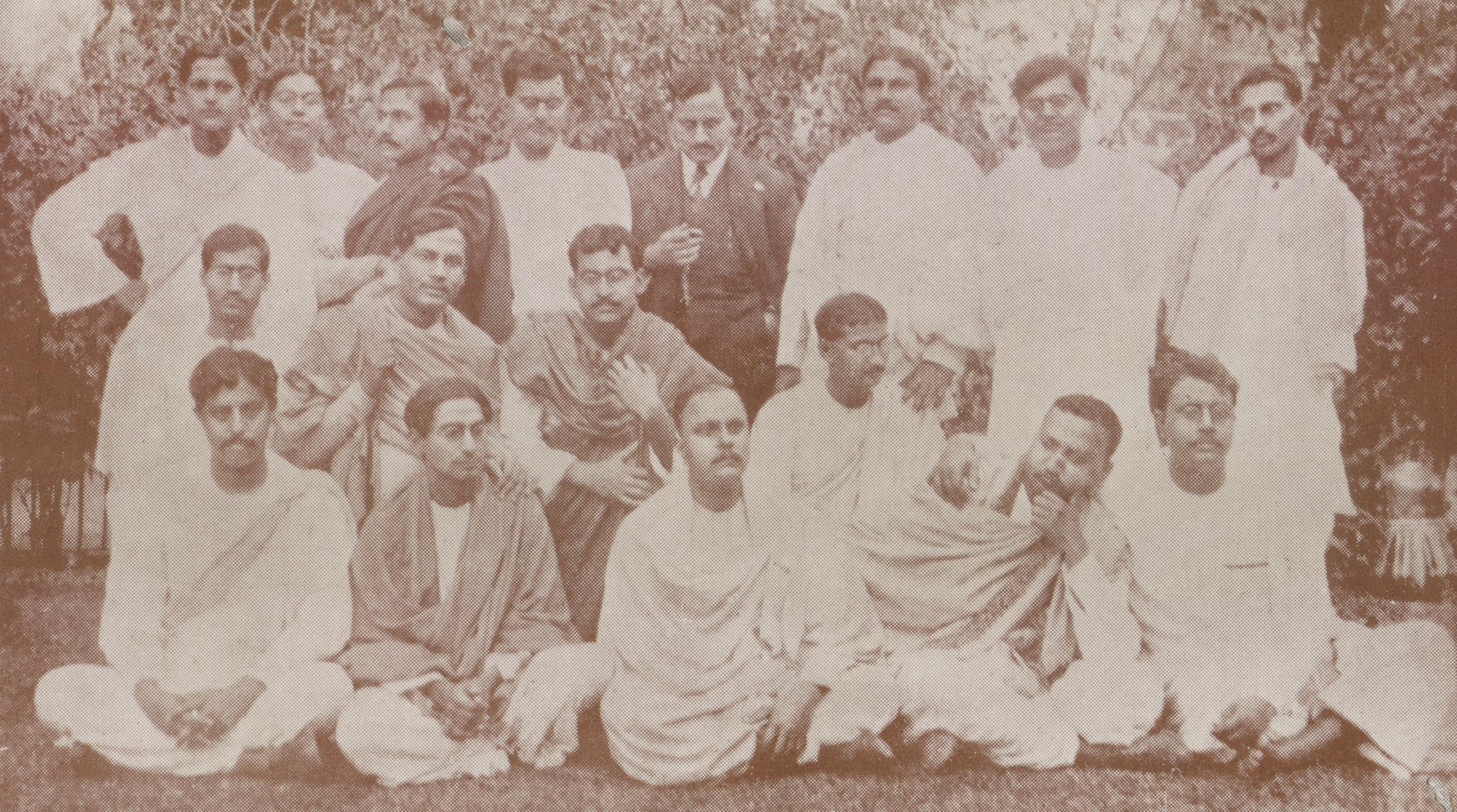
A group photo of the Monday Club, founded by Sukumar Roy First row sitting from left: Subinoy Ray, Prasanta Chandra Mahalanobis, Atul Prasad Sen, Shishir Kumar Datta, Sukumar Ray Middle row from left: Jatindranath Mukhopadhyay, Amal Home, Suniti Kumar Chattopadhyay, Jibanmoy Roy Standing from left: Hiran Sanyal, Ajit Kumar Chakrabarty, Kalidas Nag, Pravat Chandra Gangopadhyay, Dr. Dwijendranath Maitra, Satish Chandra Chattopadhyay, Shrish Chandra Sen, Girija Shankar Roy Choudhury

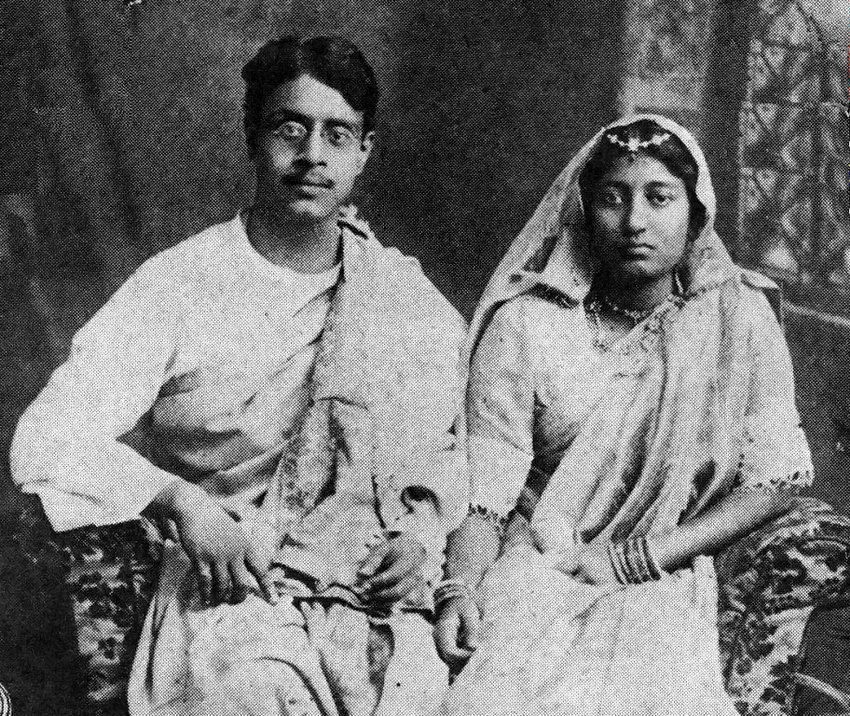
Sukumar Ray with his wife Suprabha Ray (1914)

In 1906, Ray graduated with double Honours in physics and chemistry from the Presidency College, then affiliated with the University of Calcutta. Before that, he attended City College School, Surya Sen Street along with his classmate who inspired his famous funny character "Pagla Dashu", which appeared in several of his penned stories. He was trained in photography and printing technology in England at the London County Council School of Photoengraving and Lithography and Manchester Municipal School of Technology, and was a pioneer of photography and lithography in India. While in England, he also delivered lectures about the songs of Rabindranath before Tagore won the Nobel Prize. Meanwhile, Sukumar had also drawn acclaim as an illustrator. As a technologist, he also developed new methods of halftone blockmaking, and technical articles about this were published in journals in England. The Penrose Annual published two articles by Ray. While in the United Kingdom, he joined the Royal Photographic Society in 1912 and remained a member until his death, gaining his Fellowship in 1922.

Upendrakishore started a publishing firm, U. Ray and Sons, which Sukumar and Subinay helped to run. While Sukumar went to England to learn printing technology, Upendrakishore purchased land, constructed a building, and set up a printing press with facilities for high-quality halftone color blockmaking and printing. He launched the children's magazine, Sandesh, in May 1913. Very soon after Sukumar's return from England, his writings and sketches started appearing in Sandesh. After Upendrakishore died on 20 December 1915, Sukumar ran the printing and publishing businesses and the Sandesh for about eight years. His younger brother Subinoy helped him, and many relatives pitched in writing for "Sandesh".

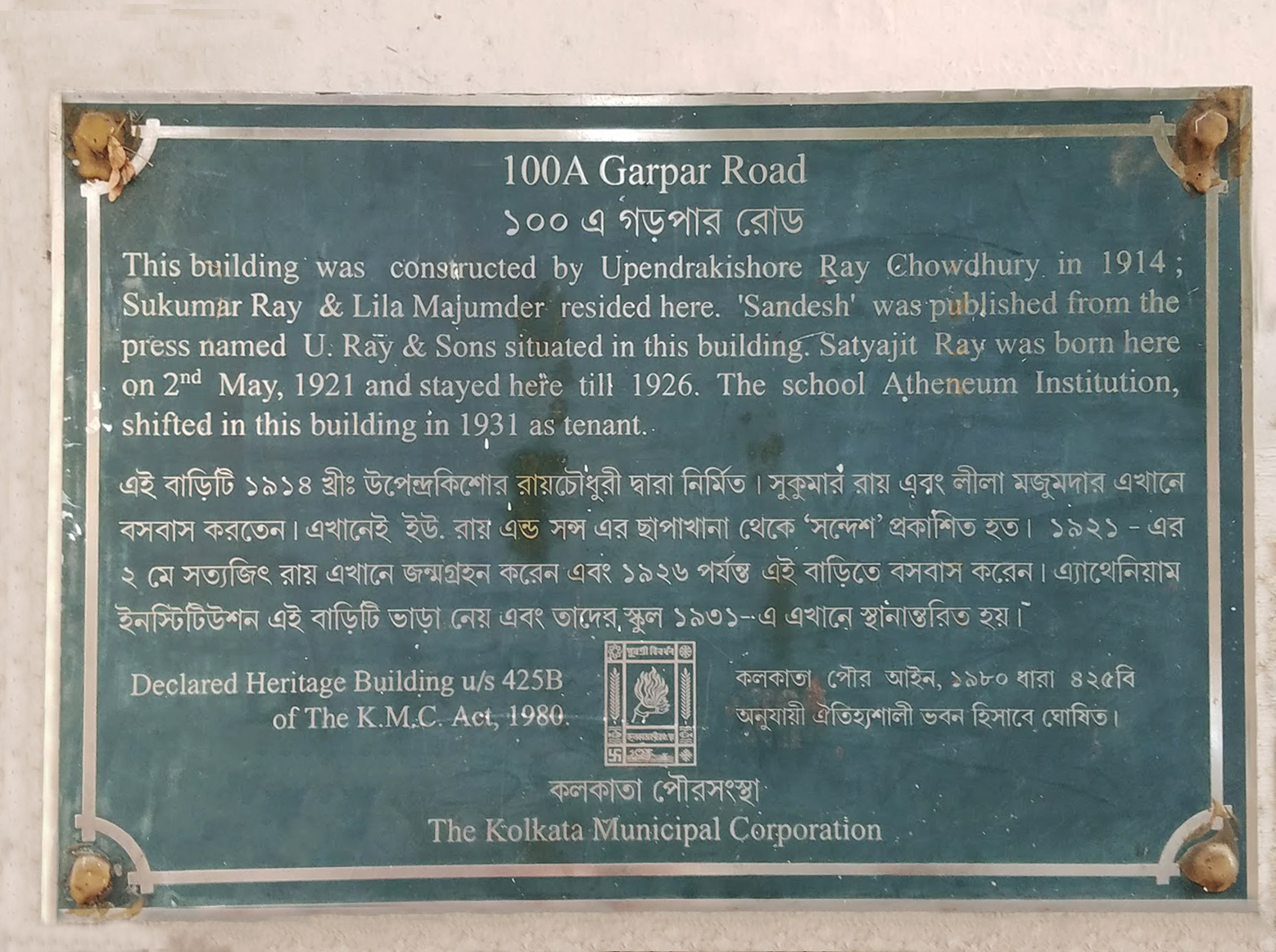
House Sukumar Ray at 100 A, Garpar Road, Kolkata - Heritage Building Tag by KMC

== Contribution in literature ==
Sukumar Ray pioneered the genre of literary nonsense in Bengali literature. His works appealed to both children and adults, because of their sense of humor, keen observational skills, sharp wit, and command of word selection. His son Satyajit Ray, in the preface of the first edition of the compilation of Sukumar Ray's complete works in his centenary year, Sukumar Sahitya Samagra, wrote:

"উপেন্দ্রকিশোরের সম্পাদনাকালে সন্দেশে প্রকাশিত সুকুমারের কয়েকটি রচনায় তাঁর সাহিত্যিক বৈশিষ্ট্যের স্পষ্ট ইঙ্গিত পাওয়া যায়। ১৯১৪ সালে বেরোল আবোল তাবোল শ্রেনীর প্রথম কবিতা "খিচুড়ি"। এই প্রথম সুকুমার সাহিত্যে উদ্ভট প্রানীর আবির্ভাব। এখানে প্রানীর সৃষ্টি হয়েছে ভাষার কারসাজিতে -

হাঁস ছিল সজারুও, (ব্যাকরণ মানিনা)
হয়ে গেল হাঁসজারু কেমনে তা জানিনা।

এই উদ্ভট সন্ধির নিযমেই সৃষ্টি হল বকচ্ছপ, মোরগরু,গিরগিটিয়া, সিংহরিণ, হাতিমি।"

English Translation: "During Upendrakishore's editorial tenure, in several writings of Sukumar published in Sandesh, clear indications of his literary characteristics can be found. In 1914, the first poem of the Berol Abol Tabol series, "Khichuri," was released. Here, for the first time, the appearance of strange creatures in Sukumar's literature occurs. Here, the creatures are created through the tricks of language—

The goose was sojaru, it became hansjaru, how that happened, I do not know.

In accordance with this strange evening's rules, Bakchhop, Morgoru, Girgitiya, Singhorin, Hatimi were created."

After his father's death in 1915, Sukumar had to take over responsibility for the publication of "Sandesh", and his creativity reached its pinnacle. The 45 limericks in Abol Tabol and many other creations published in Sandesh still amuse the readers of all ages. He created many characters in his prose and poems. Kaath Buro, Tash Goru, Huko Mukho Hangla, Kumro Potash, etc. were fictitious characters, though they were very close to our known world. He himself described his works as the product of Kheyal Ros (হঠাৎ ইচ্ছা;ঝোঁক/Wish; Whims; Freak; Fancy).

== Gallery ==
Sketches of characters created by Roy.

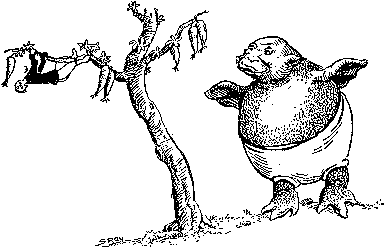
Kumropatash in Abol Tabol

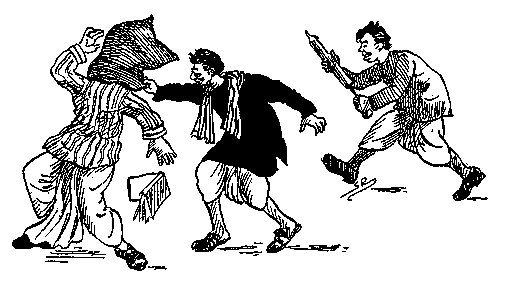
Dashur Kirti

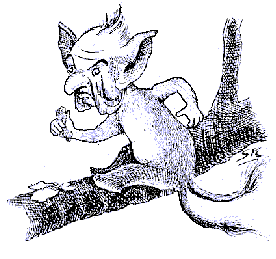
Huko Mukho Hangla

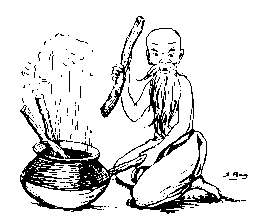
Kaath Buro

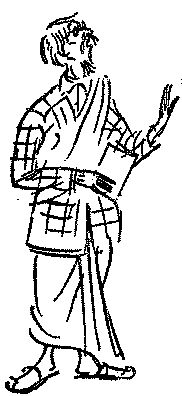
Abujh

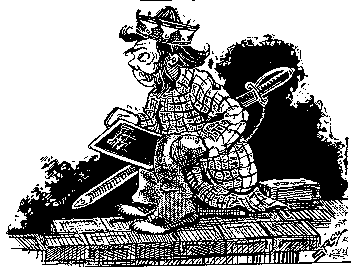
The King
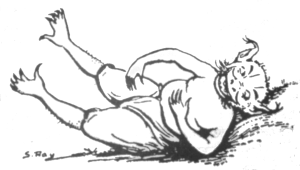
Hijibijbij in HaJaBaRaLa

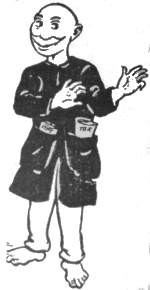
Nyara in HaJaBaRaLa

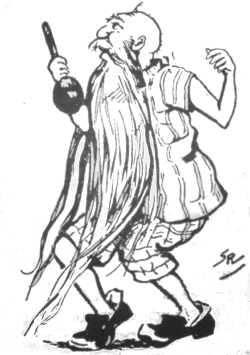
Udo in HaJaBaRaLa

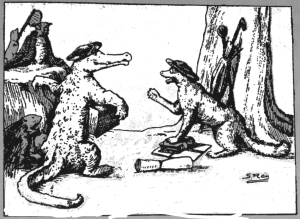
The Court Room in HaJaBaRaLa

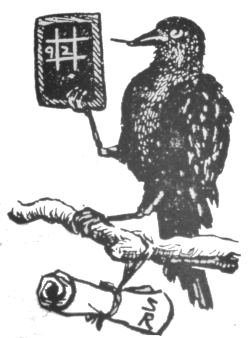
Shri Kakeswar Kuchkuche in HaJaBaRaLa

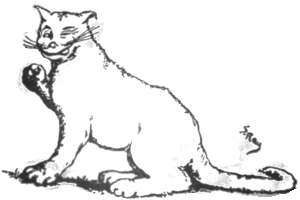
The CAT in HaJaBaRaLa

== Bibliography ==
- Abol Tabol (The Weird and the Absurd)
- Pagla Dashu (Crazy Dashu)

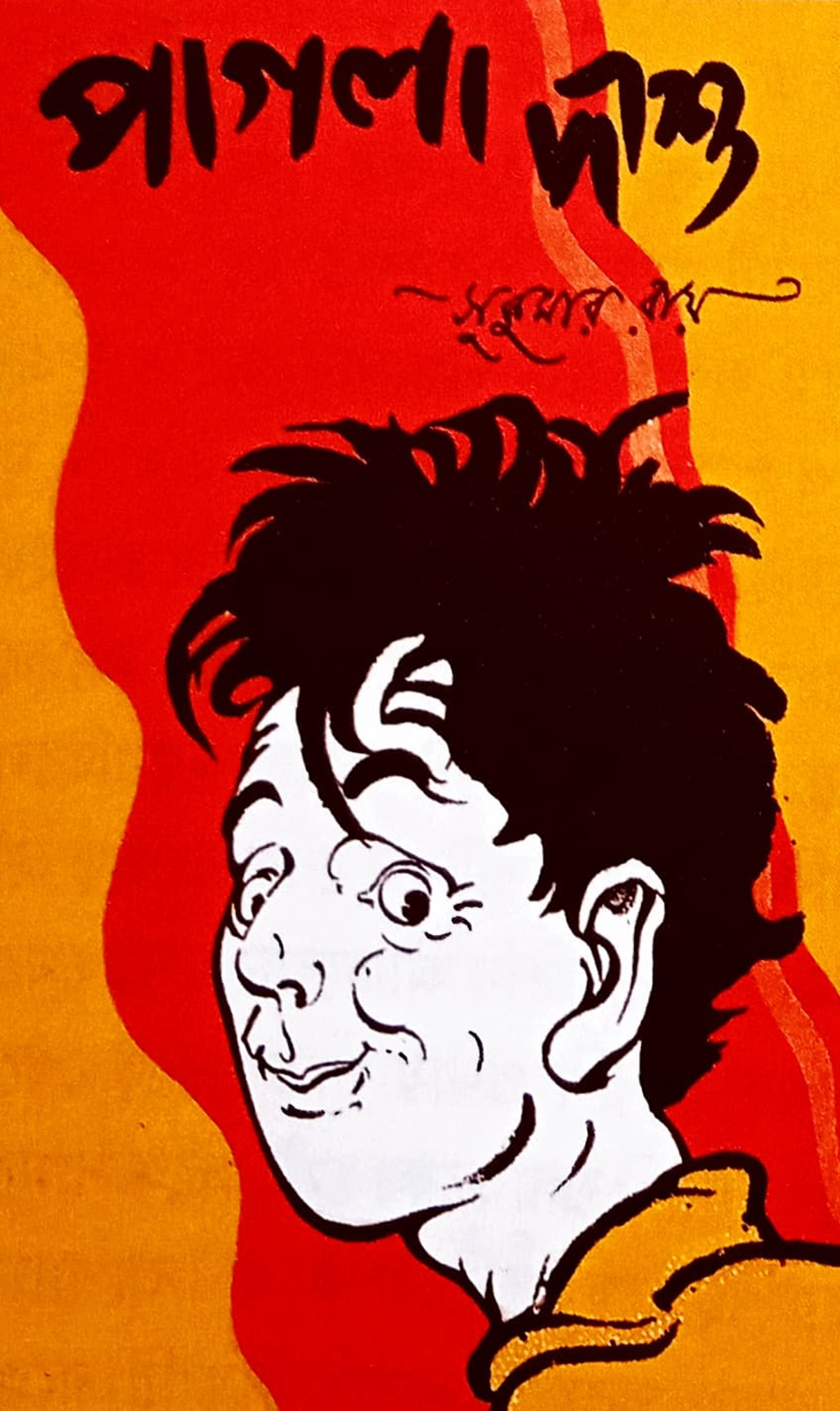
Pagla Dashu

- Khai-Khai (Eat-Eat)
- Heshoram Hushiyarer Diary (The diary of Heshoram Hushiyar) (early science fiction parody)
- HaJaBaRaLa (Mumbo-Jumbo)
- Jhalapala O Onanyo Natok (Cacophony and Other Plays)
- Lokkhoner Shoktishel (Lokkhon Shellshocked)
- Chalachittachanchari
- Shabdakalpadrum
- Bohurupi (Chameleon)
- Abak Jalpan (A Strange Drink of Water 1914)
- Bhasar Atyachar (Torture of Language 1915)
- Barnamalatatva (Theory of Alphabet)
- Desh-Bidesher Golpo (Tales from Many Lands)
- Jiboner Hisab (Bidye bojhai babumoshai)

== See also ==
- List of Indian writers
