= List of Bangladeshi artists =

This is a list of notable visual artists from, or associated with, Bangladesh.

== A ==
- Zainul Abedin (1914–1976)
- Safiuddin Ahmed (1922–2012)
- Shahabuddin Ahmed (born 1950)
- Monirul Islam (artist) (born 1942)
- Tofail Ahmed (1920–2002)
- Novera Ahmed (1939–2015)
- Mubinul Azim (1934–1975)
- Atia Islam Anne (born 1962)
- Ashfika Rahman (born 1988)

== B ==
- Murtoza Bashir (1932–2020)
- Kazi Abdul Baset (1935–2002)
- Shishir Bhattacharjee (born 1960)
- Shyamal Bashak (born 1967)
- Nobo Kumar Bhadra (born 1964)

== C ==
- Kanak Chanpa Chakma (born 1963)
- Rashid Choudhury (1932–1986)
- Qayyum Chowdhury (1932–2014)
- Devdas Chakraborty (1933–2008)
- Samarjit Roy Chowdhury (born 1937)

== F ==
- Firoz Mahmud (born 1974)
- Ferdousi Priyabhashini (1947–2018)

== H ==
- Mrinal Haque (1958–2020)
- Quamrul Hassan (1921–1988)
- Laisul Hoque (born 1998)

== I ==
- Aminul Islam (1931–2011)
- Monirul Islam (born 1942)
- Syful Islam (born 1946)

== J ==
- Syed Jahangir (1935–2018)
- Dilara Begum Jolly (born 1960)

== K ==
- Syed Abdullah Khalid (c. 1942–2017)
- Hashem Khan (born 1941)
- Mohammad Kibria (1929–2011)
- Nitun Kundu (1935–2006)
- Hamiduzzaman Khan (born 1946)
- Monsur Ul Karim (born 1950)
- Kalidas Karmakar (1946)

== M ==
- Mustafa Manwar (born 1935)
- Mustapha Khalid Palash (born 1963)
- Naeem Mohaiemen (born 1969)
- Mohammad Rakibul Hasan (born 1977)
- Minar Rahman (born 1992)

== N ==
- Rafiqun Nabi (born 1943)

== R ==
- AKM Abdur Rouf (1935–2000)
- Hamidur Rahman (artist) (1928–1988)
- Abdur Razzaque (1932–2005)

== S ==
- Abdus Shakoor (born 1947)
- SM Sultan (1923–1994)
- Shamim Sikder (born 1953)

== T ==
- Tayeba Begum Lipi (born 1969)
- Md Tokon (born 1978)
