= Abd al-Razzaq =

ʻAbd al-Razzāq (ALA-LC romanization of Arabic: عبد الرزاق) is a male Muslim given name, and in modern usage, surname. It is built from the Arabic words ʻabd and al-Razzāq, (Sustainer) one of the names of God in the Qur'an, which give rise to the Muslim theophoric names. It means "servant of the All-Provider".

Because the letter r is a sun letter, the letter l of the al- is assimilated to it. Thus although the name is written in Arabic with letters corresponding to Abd al-Razzaq, the usual pronunciation corresponds to Abd ar-Razzaq. Alternative renderings include ‘Abd ar-Razzaq, Abdul Razzaq, Abdur Razaq, Abdul Razzak and others, all subject to variable spacing and hyphenation.

It may refer to:

== Given name ==
=== Afghan ===
- Abdul Razaq (Guantanamo detainee 356) (born 1971)
- Abdul Razzaq (Guantanamo detainee 923)
- Abdul Razak (Guantanamo detainee 1043)
- Abdur Razzaq (Taliban official) (born 1958), politician
- Abdul Razaq (cricketer) (born 2000), cricketer

=== Algerian ===
- Abderrazak Bounour (born 1957), runner

=== Arabian ===
- ‘Abd ar-Razzaq as-San‘ani (744–827), Sunni Islamic scholar of hadith
- Shaikh Syed Abdul Razzaq Jilani (1134–1207), shaikh of Qadiriyya order after Abdul Qadir Jilani

=== Bangladeshi ===
- Abdur Razzaque (artist) (1932–2005), artist
- Abdur Razzaq (professor) (1914–1999), professor
- Abdur Razzak (actor) (1942–2017), actor
- Abdur Razzaq (politician, born 1942) (1942–2011), politician
- Abdur Razzaq (Faridpur-4 politician) (died 2002), politician
- Abdur Razzaq (lawyer, born 1949) (1949–2025), lawyer
- Mohammad Abdur Razzaque (born 1950), Food Minister of Bangladesh
- Abdur Razzak (cricketer) (born 1982), cricketer
- Abdul Razzak Rajib, cricketer
- Abdur Razzak Khan (1946–2016), politician
- Abdur Razzak Mukul, politician

=== Chinese ===
- Abdul Razakah, former Guantanamo detainee (ISN 219)

=== Egyptian ===
- Abd El-Razzak El-Sanhuri (1895–1971), legal scholar

=== Ghanaian ===
- Karim Abdul Razak (born 1956), footballer
- Ibrahim Abdul Razak (born 1983), footballer

=== Indian ===
- Abdool Razack Mohamed (1906–1978), Indian-Mauritian politician
- Abdur Razzaque Ansari (1917–1992), weavers revolution leader
- K. M. Abdul Razack, politician
- Mufti Abdul Razzaq (1925–2021), Muslim scholar
- Abdur Razzak Molla (1944–2025), politician

=== Indonesian ===
- Abdul Razak (canoeist) (born 1964), Olympic canoeist

=== Iraqi ===
- 'Abd al-Razzaq al-Hasani (1903–1997), historian
- Abdul-Razzaq Ahmed Taha (1910–1998), chess player
- Arif Abd ar-Razzaq (1921–2007), Prime Minister of Iraq
- Abd ar-Razzaq an-Naif (1933–1978), politician
- Haidar Abdul-Razzaq (born 1982), footballer
- Ziad Abderrazzak Mohammad Aswad (born 1952), politician
- Abdul Razak al-Hashimi, diplomat
- Abdul Razzaq Ahmed (born 1940), footballer
- Nashwan Abdulrazaq Abdulbaqi, known as Abdul Hadi al Iraqi (born 1961), Kurd held in Guantanamo (ISN 10026)
- Abdul Razzak Mirjan (1883–1970), philanthropist
- Abdul Razzaq an-Naif (1934–1978), military officer

=== Iranian ===
- Abd al-Razzaq Maymandi, 11th-century vizier
- Abd al-Razzaq Kāshānī (died 1345), 14th-century scholar
- Abd al-Razzaq Samarqandi (1413–1482), traveller to India
- Abd al-Razzaq Lahiji (died 1662), theologian
- Abd al-Razzaq Beg Donboli (1762–1828), historian

=== Ivorian ===
- Abdou Razack Traoré (born 1988), footballer
- Abdul Razak (footballer) (born 1992), footballer

=== Kuwaiti ===
- Abdul-Razzak Al-Adwani (1928–1996), academic administrator

=== Lebanese ===
- Abdul Razzak Dakramanji (born 2001), footballer

=== Libyan ===
- Abdul Razzaq as-Sawsa (1933–2016), politician
- Abdelrazak Ali Abdelrahman, Guantanamo detainee (ISN 685)

=== Malaysian ===
- Abdul Razak Hussein (1922–1976), Prime Minister of Malaysia
- Abdul Razak Baginda (born 1960), political writer
- Abdul Razak Mohaideen (born 1965), film director
- Aidil Zafuan Abdul Radzak (born 1987), footballer

=== Maldivian ===
- Abdul Razzak Aboobakur (born 1962), sprinter

=== Moroccan ===
- Abderrazak Khairi (born 1962), footballer
- Abderrazzak Jadid (born 1983), footballer

=== Myanmar ===
- U Razak (Abdul Razak) (1898–1947), politician

=== Nigerian ===
- Abdulrazak Ekpoki (born 1982), footballer

=== Pakistani ===
- Abdul Razzak Yaqoob (1944–2014), businessman
- Abdul Razzaq Anjum (1952–2003), Air Vice Marshal
- Abdur Razzaq Iskander (1935–2021), Islamic scholar and writer
- Abdul Razzaq (cricketer) (born 1979), cricketer
- Abdur Razzaq (cricketer), cricketer
- Muhammad Abdul Razzaq (born 1921), Olympic hockey player
- Abdul Raziq (politician), politician

=== Palestinian ===
- Abdel Razak al-Yehiyeh (1929–2020), politician
- Omar Abd al-Razaq, politician
- Abelhaleem Hasan Abdelraziq Ashqar, business professor imprisoned in the US

=== Saudi Arabian ===
- Abd al Razaq Abdallah Hamid Ibrahim al Sharikh (born 1984), former Guantanamo detainee (ISN 67)

=== Somali ===
- Abdirizak Haji Hussein (1924–2014), Prime Minister of Somalia
- Abdirisak Omar Mohamed, Minister of Internal Security
- Abdirizak Bihi, social activist
- Abdul Razak Ali Artan (1998–2016), perpetrator of the Ohio State University attack

=== Syrian ===
- Abd al-Razzaq al-Dandashi (1899–1935), politician
- Abdelrazaq Al Hussain (born 1986), footballer
- Abdul Razzaq al-Mahdi (born 1961), Ahrar ash-Sham cleric

=== South African ===
- Abdul Razak (South African cricketer) (born 1987), cricketer

=== Tanzanian ===
- Abdulrazak Gurnah (born 1948), Tanzanian-British novelist

=== Trinidadian ===
- Abdul Razack (cricketer) (1888–1946)

=== Yemeni ===
- Abd al-Razzaq al-San'ani (744–827), scholar
- Abdullah Abdul Razzaq Badhib, known as Abdullah Badhib (1931–1975), political activist, known as founder of Yemeni communism
- Abdul Al Razzaq Muhammad Salih, former Guantanamo detainee (ISN 233)

== Surname ==
- Wafaa Abed Al Razzaq (born 1952), Iraqi poet
- Dana Hussein Abdul-Razzaq (born 1986), Iraqi runner

== Other ==
- Bandar Tun Abdul Razak (established 1979), town in Malaysia
- Universiti Tun Abdul Razak (established 1997), university in Malaysia
- Sekolah Datuk Abdul Razak (founded 1957), school in Malaysia
- SMK Tun Abdul Razak (founded 1959), school in Malaysia
- Masjid Al-Abdul Razak (built 1965), mosque in Singapore
- Musannaf of Abd al-Razzaq, book written by ‘Abd ar-Razzaq as-San‘ani
