= List of Bangladeshi painters =

Following is a list of Bangladeshi painters (in alphabetical order).

== A ==
- Zainul Abedin
- Safiuddin Ahmed
- Shahabuddin Ahmed

== B ==
- Murtoza Bashir
- Shishir Bhattacharjee

== C ==
- Kanak Chanpa Chakma
- Devdas Chakraborty
- Rashid Choudhury
- Qayyum Chowdhury

== H ==
- Quamrul Hassan

== I ==
- Aminul Islam
- Monirul Islam
- Syful Islam

== J ==
- Syed Jahangir
- Dilara Begum Jolly

== K ==
- Mohammad Kibria
- Nitun Kundu
- Hashem Khan

== M ==
- Firoz Mahmud
- Mustafa Manwar

== N ==
- Rafiqun Nabi
- Najib Tareque

== P ==
- Mustapha Khalid Palash

== R ==
- Hamidur Rahman
- Abdur Razzaque

== S ==
- Abdus Shakoor
- SM Sultan

== Z ==
- Farida Zaman

== See also ==
- List of Bangladeshi people

== Notes and references ==
=== References ===
- Dave-Mukherji, Parul; Wille, Simone; Haque, AKM Khademul; Sanathanan, T. (2015). "Visual Arts in South Asia". In Lindgren, Allana; Ross, Stephen (eds.). The Modernist World. Routledge. ISBN 978-1-317-69616-2.
- Selim, Lala Rukh, ed. (December 2007). Arts and Crafts. Cultural Survey of Bangladesh Series. Vol. 8. Asiatic Society of Bangladesh. ISBN 984-300-000965.
- Selim, Lala Rukh (2000). "Women in the Contemporary Art World of Bangladesh: Images and Reality". In Panandiker, V. A. Pai; Behera, Navnita Chadha (eds.). Perspectives on South Asia. Delhi: Konark Publishers. OCLC 44503780.
- Shamsuzzaman, Abdul Fazal (1992). Who's Who in Bangladesh Art Culture Literature (1901-1991). Tribhuj Prakashani. OCLC 28114771.
