= Shankhari Bazaar =

Coordinates: 23.709995°N 90.409683°E

Shankhari Potti শাঁখারী পট্টি
- Neighborhoods in Dhaka
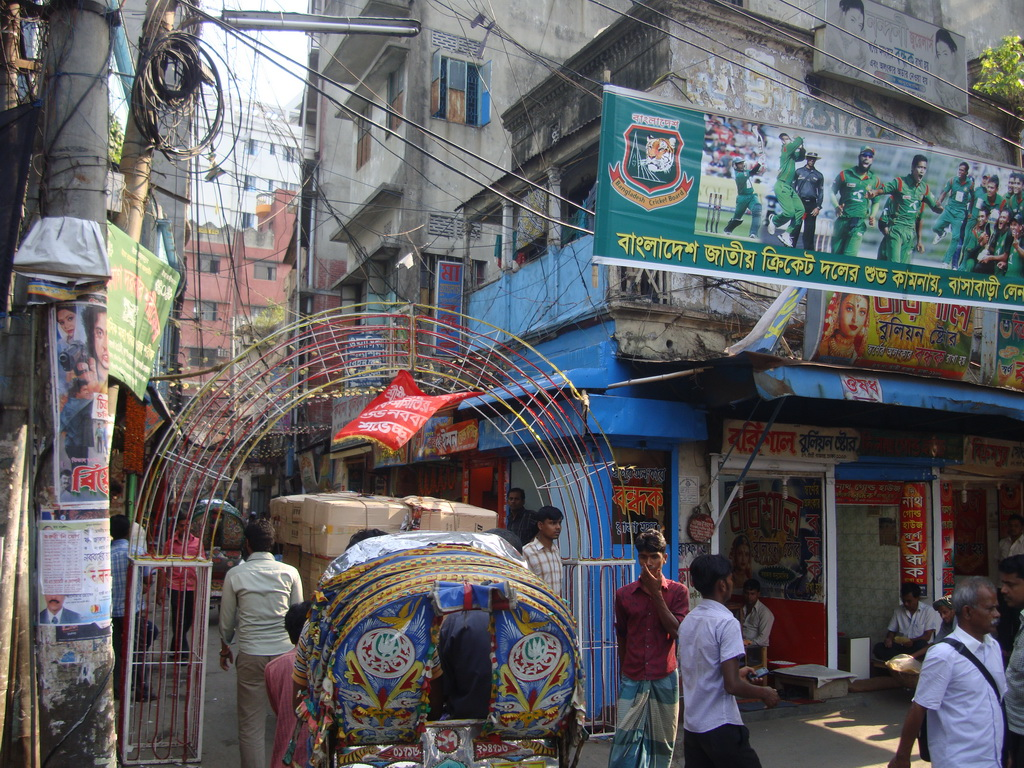
- Interactive map of Shankhari Potti
- Country: Bangladesh
- Division: Dhaka Division
- City: Dhaka

Shankhari Bazaar is one of the oldest areas in Bangladesh's Old Dhaka, broadly known as Shankhari Potti. It stretches along a narrow lane, lined with richly decorated brick buildings, built during the late Mughal or Colonial period.

== Location ==
Shankhari Bazar is located near the intersection of Islampur Road and Nawabpur Road, a block north of the Buriganga River. The place especially belongs to the Bengali Hindus. About 70%–80% of the area's residents are Bengali Hindus, the rest being Muslims.

== Background and Name ==
The area was dominated by the Shankhari community, who derived their name from Shankha, a decorated bangle crafted from slices of Shankha or conch shells. A Shankha bangle is the symbol that indicates that a Hindu woman is married. In the 17th century, the Shankharis (conch shell workers) were reportedly brought to Dhaka by the Mughal emperor, who allotted them this area for settlement; it later became known as Shankhari Bazaar. Shankhari Bazaar is a long narrow street lined by brick buildings of some antiquity. The buildings are about 12 ft wide, 70–100 ft deep and 2–3 storeys high. The greatest height of the buildings is four storeys. Every house used to have a temple room in it.

== The craft of the Shankharis ==
The Shankhari or Shankha Banik people are a Bengali artisan caste. Their traditional occupation is the preparation of bangles and rings made from slices of shankha or conch shell, using specialized tools. Dhaka was for long the main centre of the conch cutting industry in India. In 1971 a massacre carried out by the Pakistan Army during the Bangladesh War of Liberation greatly reduced the population of Shankharis in Dhaka, and the main centre of the industry is now Kolkata.

== Faith ==
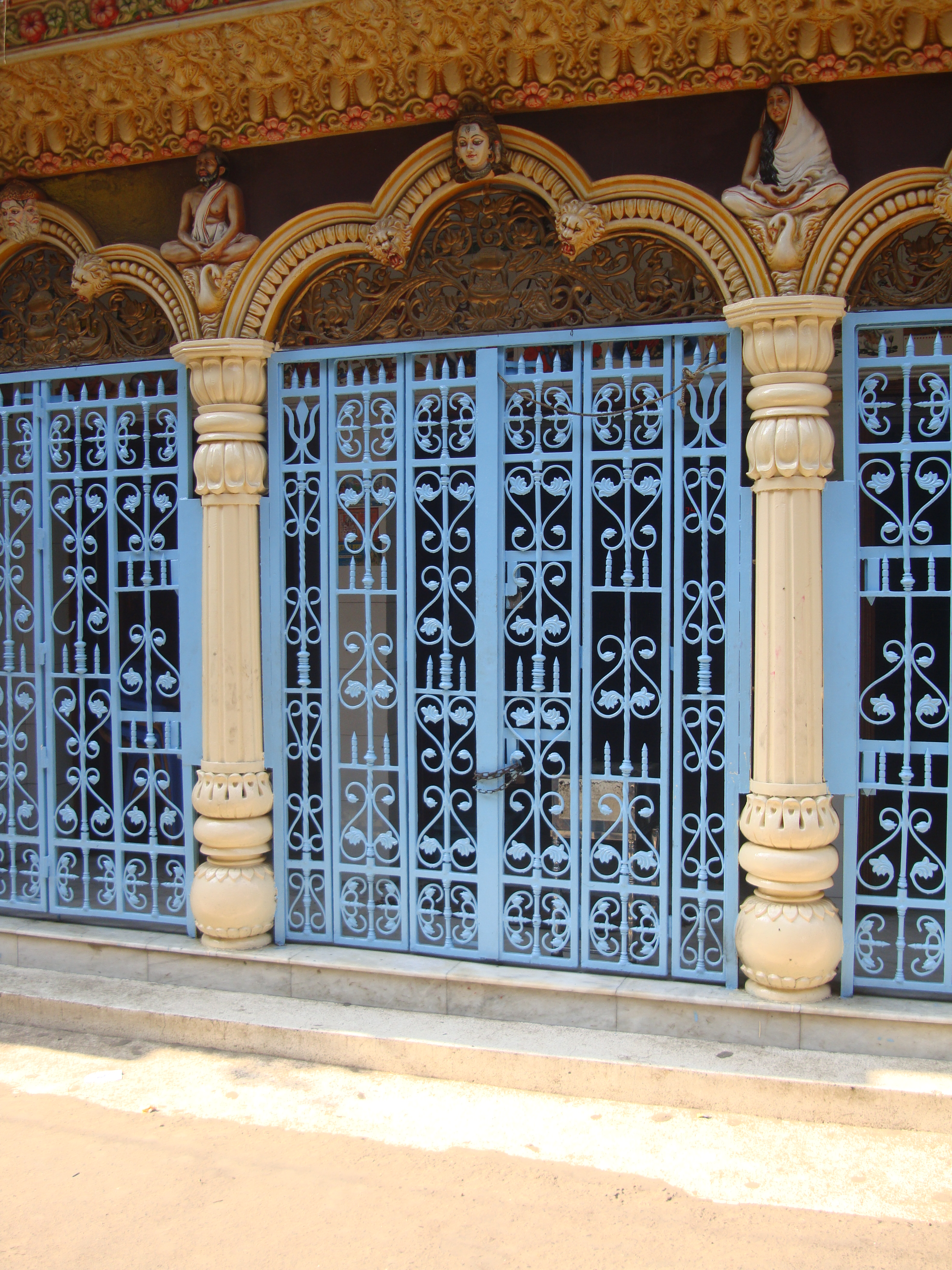
Temple Gate

According to James Hornell F.L.S., Superintendent of the Pearl and Chank Fisheries to the Government of Madras at the beginning of the 20th century, "The workers belong exclusively to the Sankhari sub-caste of Vaishyas: they appear to be very conservative and have the reputation of being exceedingly clannish." Currently most of the Shankhari people belong to the Vaishnava branch of Hinduism, and some to the Shakta school; many are vegetarian.

== Temples and Durga Puja ==
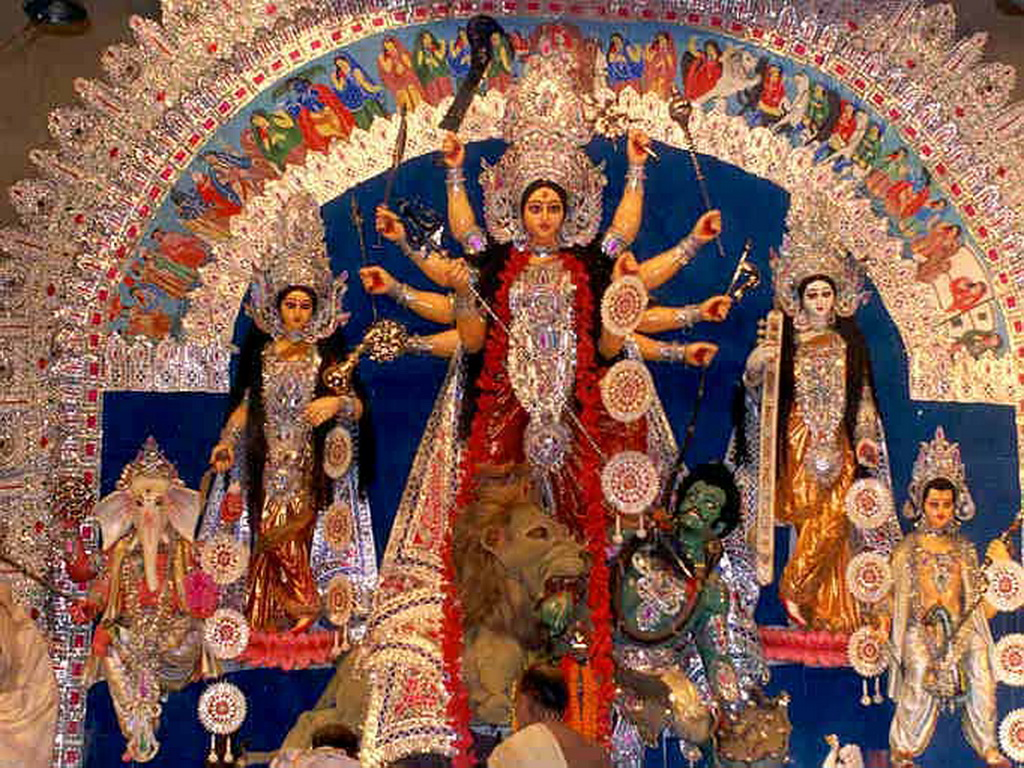
Statue of Deity Durga

The Hindu temples are one of the major attractions of Shankhari Bazar. There are many temples on this narrow street. Over the ages, Shankhari Bazaar has been elevated to the level of the most popular centre for religious festivities. As one of the most densely populated areas in the world Shankhari Bazaar also has the largest concentration of the Hindus in Dhaka. The temples are small in size but well decorated with ornamental motifs on the entrance and on the walls of the temples. The temples contain the statue of goddess Durga, Ganesha, Shiva etc. Durga Puja is the major festival of Hindu people. During Durga puja, people gathers in Shankhari Bazaar to worship and view goddess Durga. Besides Hindu, handful Muslims also attend the Puja. In Durga puja, Shankhari Bazaar looks quite nice because of colourful feston, banner etc. Small and temporary food shops are also built during Durga puja. People from different places come to Shankhari Bazaar to see the Puja.

== Pannitola ==
Pannitola is in the Rakhal Chandra Basak Lane of Shankhari Bazaar. The name Pannitola basically came from the first settling area of the Panniwala, people who used to make the foil of tin. The living style of the Panniwala's was similar to the Shankhari people.

== Notable residents ==
- Nobo Kumar Bhadra, rickshaw artist, was born in Shakhari Bazar in 1964.

== Photo gallery ==
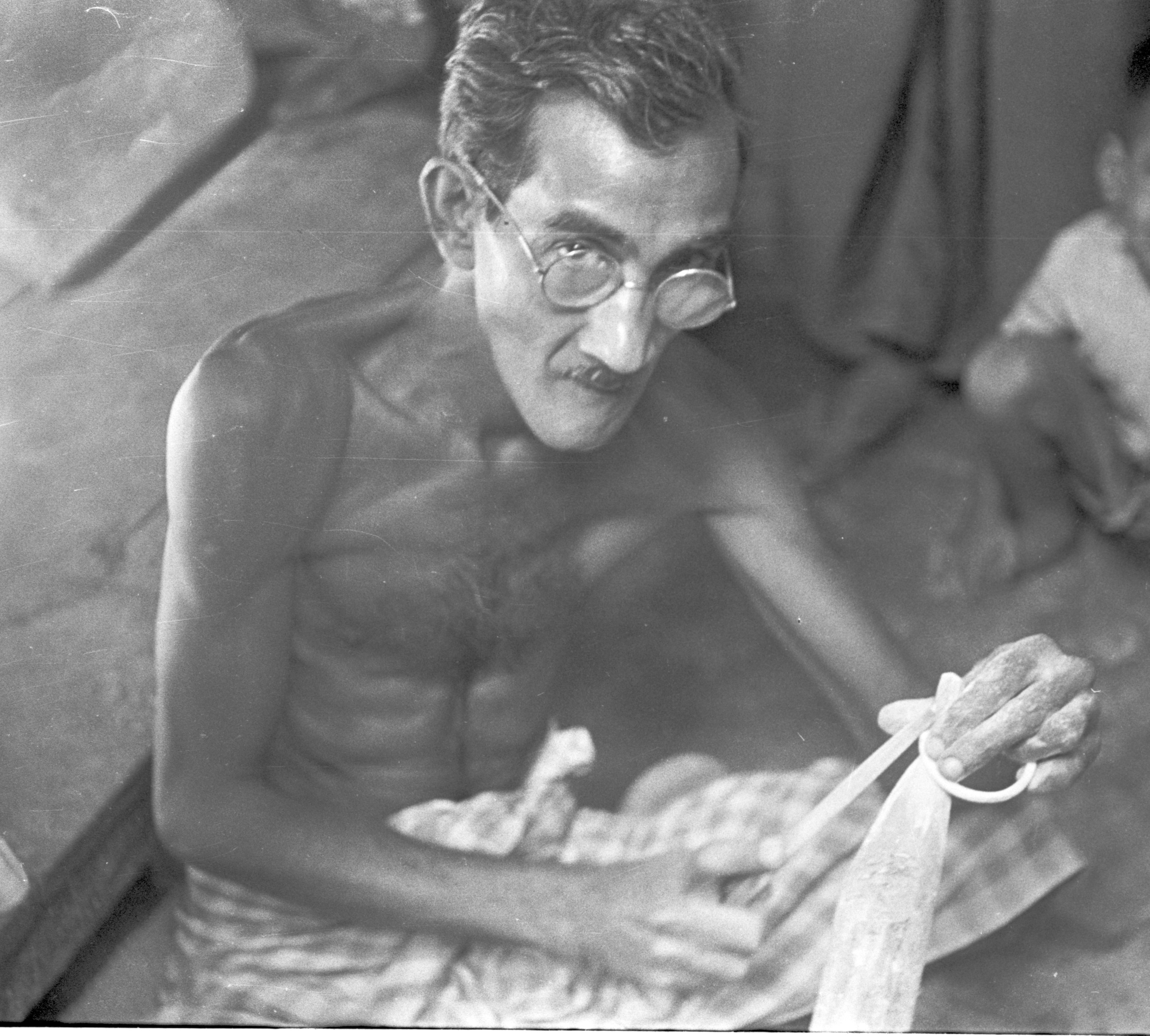
A shankhari working on a conch bangle (1966)

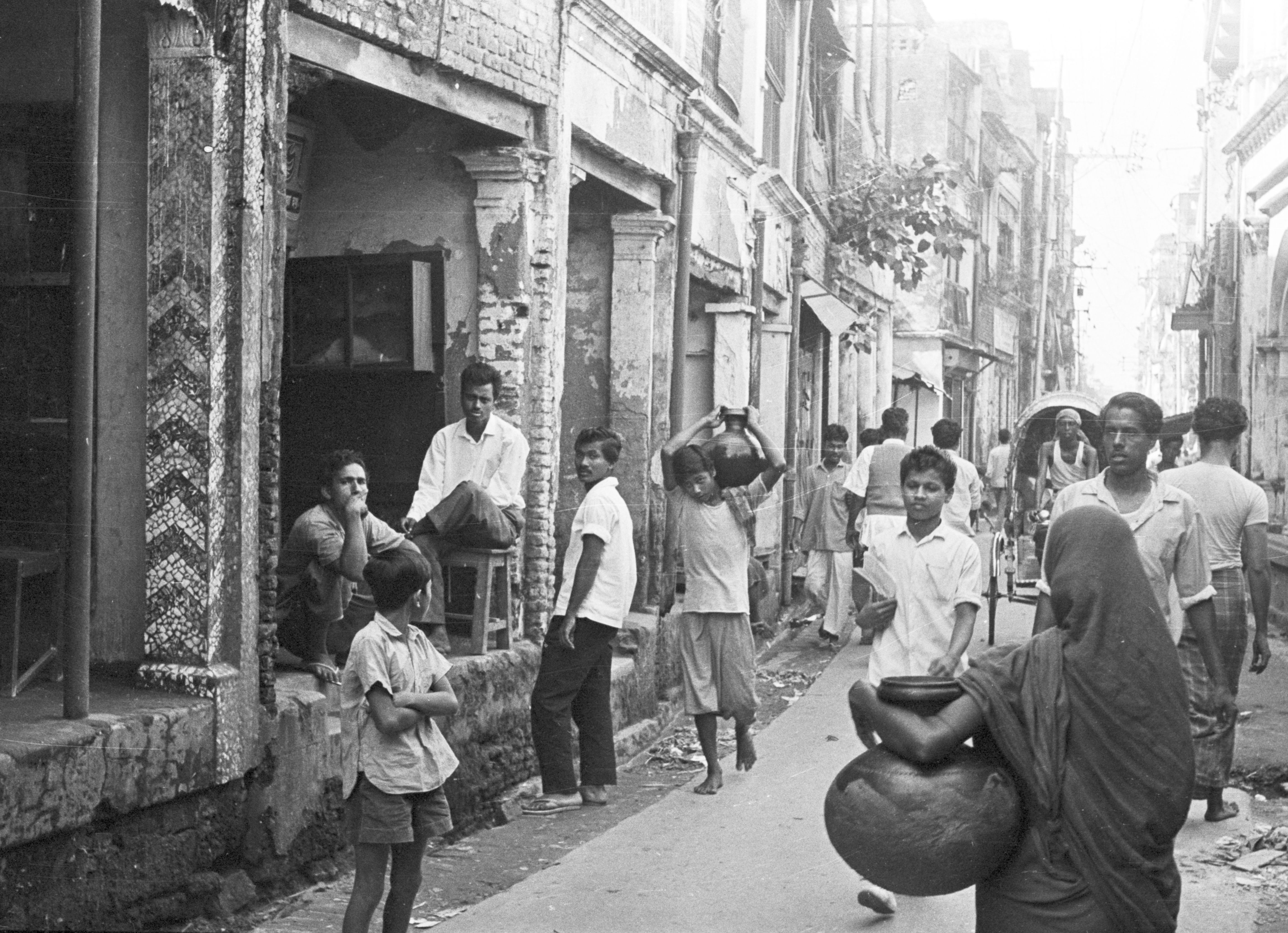
Shankharipatti, the street of conch workers (1966)

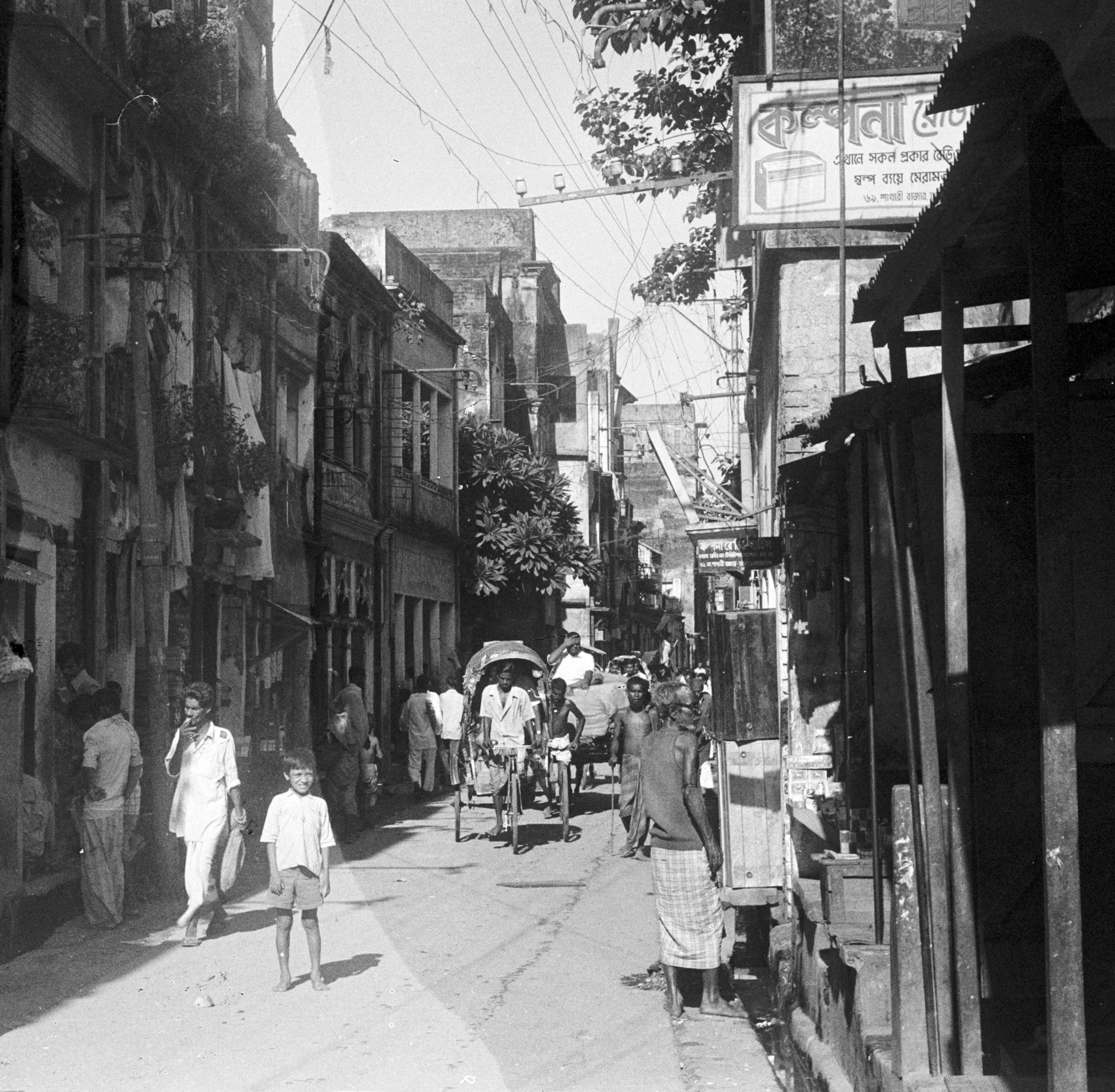
Shankharipatti (1975)

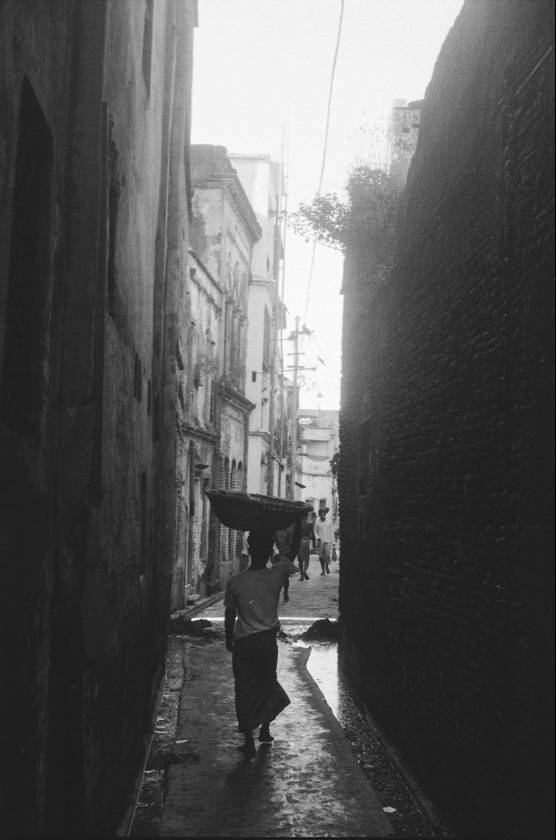
Pannitola (1967)

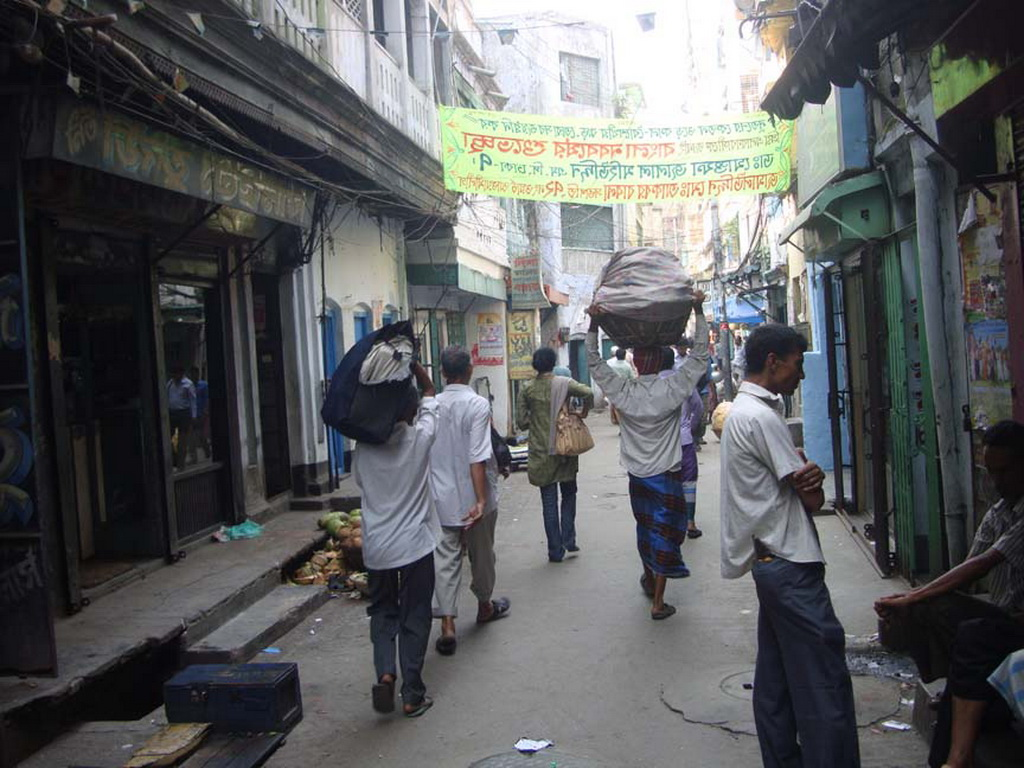
Pannitola (2011)
