= Laisul Hoque =

Bangladeshi artist based in London

- লাইসুল হক
- Born: 1998 (age 27–28); Dhaka, Bangladesh
- Education: North South University (BA); Central Saint Martins (MA)
- Occupations: Artist, filmmaker

Laisul Hoque is a Bangladeshi artist and filmmaker based in London. Primarily producing installations, photographs, and short-films, Hoque's work deals with social, personal, and familial histories.

== Life and education ==
Hoque was born in 1998 in Dhaka, Bangladesh. He completed his O levels and A levels from the Bangladesh International Tutorial (BIT). He attended North South University in Dhaka, where he graduated with a Bachelor of Arts in English Literature in 2020. He later moved to the United Kingdom and completed a Master of Arts in Contemporary Photography at Central Saint Martins, University of the Arts London, in 2022.

== Work ==
Laisul Hoque started making experimental short films on YouTube from 2017. He primarily produces installations, photographs, and films. Hoque's work deals with "autobiographical histories and their intersections with broader political, cultural, and emotional landscapes."

=== The Purpose was to Document the Other Side ===
During my school years, we practiced speaking English, made friends, and learned to express our emotions—bonding in the English language. At home, my mother spoke Bangla. The responsibilities of parenthood made her communicate with authority, being the matriarch. However, in this process, we missed opportunities to express our emotions in Bangla. The influence of globalisation resulted in learning emotive language and communication exclusively in English, a language my mother couldn't speak.

— Laisul Hoque, The Daily Star

His 2023 short film The Purpose was to Document the Other Side was shown at several international venues, including the Barbican Centre in London as part of the Chronic Youth Film Festival, EXPERIMENTA at the Goethe-Institut in Bangalore, and the Alliance Française de Dhaka.

The film was made using "a camera his [Hoque's] father bought twenty years earlier to record his own journey through Europe."

In 2024, the film was shortlisted for the CIRCA Prize and was subsequently broadcast on public electronic billboards, including Piccadilly Lights in London, Kurfürstendamm in Berlin, and Cadorna Square in Milan. Discussing the film for The White Pube, art critic Zarina Muhammad noted that the film's reliance on "images and gesture fill the gap where pain reduces language to a kind of flimsy dust."

=== An Ode to All the Flavours ===
In 2024, Hoque exhibited an installation titled An Ode to All the Flavours at the Whitechapel Gallery. The work consisted of a physical replica of a Bangladeshi sweet shop counter serving traditional snacks. Critics noted Hoque's use of a recreated storefront and local culinary partnerships to explore non-verbal communication and traditional masculinity within the British Bengali diaspora. Eshadi Sharif of The Business Standard noted that the installation "focused on empowering the Bangladeshi community in London while connecting locals with Bangladeshi culture."

Art critic Zarina Muhammad of The White Pube interpreted the installation as a "monument to fleeting moments" of paternal intimacy. She further noted that placing these specific cultural objects inside the Whitechapel Gallery acted as a "grab at conceptual value" that highlighted "the institutional shell, the power dynamic, [and] the players" of the contemporary art world.

Writing for Harper's Bazaar India, Upasana Das described the work as "honing into the singular visual of the roadside sweet shop lodged in his [Hoque's] memory." Speaking with SHOWstudio, prize judge and journalist Louise Benson stated that the installation was "quietly political in its direct engagement of local enterprise while remaining deeply personal," the installation was "both inward and outward-looking." Hoque was subsequently awarded the 2025 East London Art Prize for the installation. He was selected for the £15,000 award from a shortlist of 12 artists, following an open call that received 900 submissions from across East London.

=== The Ground Beneath Me ===
Following the award, East London based arts and education charity Bow Arts commissioned Hoque's solo exhibition, The Ground Beneath Me, held at the Nunnery Gallery in early 2026. For the exhibition, Hoque relocated the furniture and objects from his London residence into the gallery space to reflect on personal and national events surrounding a temporary return to Bangladesh. The exhibition was featured in Dazed magazine's list of "Art shows to leave the house for in February 2026." British Vogue described the exhibition as "a poignant installation." In her review for East End Review, Sarah Birch called the installation "a lyrical reflection on time and place."

=== Others ===
As a recipient of the 2025–2026 Film London Artists' Moving Image Network (FLAMIN) Fellowship, Hoque produced the film ''Legacy of a Heart's Injury'' (2026). According to Italian art magazine Mousse, the work documents a conversation about grief between the artist and a friend, interspersed with footage of Hoque's father discussing politics, exploring the intersection of personal loss and public history.

Hoque participates in artist talks and panel discussions. In 2026, Hoque took part in an artist talk in conversation with art critic Zarina Muhammad (co-founder of The White Pube) at Nunnery Gallery, as part of the public programme for his solo exhibition. The same year, he joined a University College London x Bow Arts knowledge exchange panel and spoke in conversation with Muhammad at Nunnery Gallery. In 2025, he discussed his East London Art Prize-winning installation with Muhammad at the same venue. In 2024, he took part in discussions at Whitechapel Gallery and the Barbican Centre.

In 2023, Hoque contributed the essay "Time Is Moving At A Different Pace Back Home: Leaving Behind A Version Of Us" to the Dhaka-based literary magazine Small World City.

== Exhibitions and screenings ==
=== Solo exhibitions ===
- 2026: Grand Union, Birmingham
- 2026: The Ground Beneath Me, Nunnery Gallery, London
- 2024: An Ode to All the Flavours, Whitechapel Gallery, London
- 2024: An Ode to All the Flavours, Kobi Nazrul Centre, London
- 2024: I don't Call Enough but I'm Here Now, Oitij-jo, London

=== Group exhibitions and screenings ===
- 2026: Backyard Biennial, Whitechapel Gallery, London
- 2025: East London Art Prize Late, Whitechapel Gallery, London
- 2025: Auditorium Nouvelle Vague, Alliance Française de Dhaka
- 2025: East London Art Prize, Nunnery Gallery, London
- 2025: Harlesden Video Club '24, Harlesden High Street, London
- 2025: EXPERIMENTA at Ark, Ark Foundation for the Arts, Sevasi
- 2024: EXPERIMENTA 2024, Goethe-Institut / Max Mueller Bhavan, Bangalore
- 2024: CIRCA Prize screenings, Piccadilly Lights (London), Kurfürstendamm (Berlin), and Cadorna Square (Milan)
- 2024: Summer Screening, Zéruì, London
- 2024: Project Banani 18, Dhaka (Solo screening)
- 2024: Studio 6/6, Dhaka (Solo screening)
- 2024: EkshoEk, Dhaka (Solo screening)
- 2024: Chronic Youth Film Festival, Barbican Centre, London
- 2023: Bhalo Basha, Toynbee Hall, London
- 2023: ELO MELO Festival, Whitechapel Gallery, London
- 2023: Molasses Vases, hARTslane, London
- 2022: Ajker, Oitij-jo, London
- 2022: Degree Show, Central Saint Martins, London

== Awards ==
- 2024: Finalist, CIRCA Prize
- 2025: Winner, East London Art Prize
- 2025–2026: Fellow, Film London Artists' Moving Image Network (FLAMIN) Fellowship
