= Science fiction magazine =

Publication that offers primarily science fiction

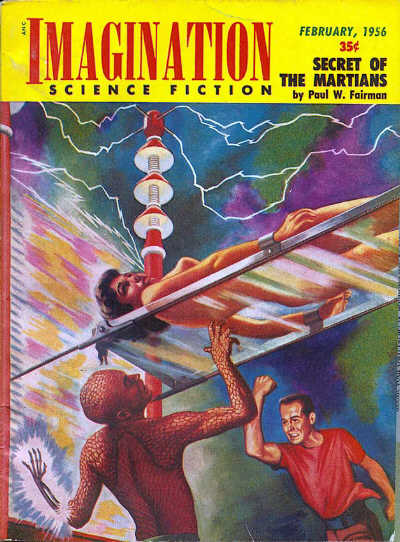
A front cover of Imagination, a science fiction magazine in 1956

A science fiction magazine is a publication that offers primarily science fiction, either in a hard-copy periodical format or on the Internet. Science fiction magazines traditionally featured speculative fiction in short story, novelette, novella or (usually serialized) novel form, a format that continues into the present day. Many also contain editorials, book reviews or articles, and some also include stories in the fantasy and horror genres.

== History ==
Malcolm Edwards and Peter Nicholls write that early magazines were not known as science fiction: "if there were any need to differentiate them, the terms scientific romance or 'different stories' might be used, but until the appearance of a magazine specifically devoted to sf there was no need of a label to describe the category. The first specialized English-language pulps with a leaning towards the fantastic were Thrill Book (1919) and Weird Tales (1923), but the editorial policy of both was aimed much more towards weird-occult fiction than towards sf."

Major American science fiction magazines include Amazing Stories, Astounding Science Fiction, Galaxy Science Fiction, The Magazine of Fantasy & Science Fiction and Isaac Asimov's Science Fiction Magazine. The most influential British science fiction magazine was New Worlds; newer British SF magazines include Interzone and Polluto. Many science fiction magazines have been published in languages other than English, but none has gained worldwide recognition or influence in the world of anglophone science fiction.

There is a growing trend toward important work being published first on the Internet, both for reasons of economics and access. A web-only publication can cost as little as one-tenth of the cost of publishing a print magazine, and as a result, some believe the e-zines are more innovative and take greater risks with material. Moreover, the magazine is internationally accessible, and distribution is not an issue—though obscurity may be. Magazines like Strange Horizons, Ideomancer, InterGalactic Medicine Show, Jim Baen's Universe, and the Australian magazine Andromeda Spaceways Inflight Magazine are examples of successful Internet magazines. (Andromeda provides copies electronically or on paper.)

Web-based magazines tend to favor shorter stories and articles that are easily read on a screen, and many of them pay little or nothing to the authors, thus limiting their universe of contributors. However, multiple web-based magazines are listed as "paying markets" by the SFWA, which means that they pay the "professional" rate of 8c/word or more. These magazines include popular titles such as Strange Horizons, InterGalactic Medicine Show, and Clarkesworld Magazine. The SFWA publishes a list of qualifying magazine and short fiction venues that contains all current web-based qualifying markets.

The World Science Fiction Convention (Worldcon) awarded a Hugo Award each year to the best science fiction magazine, until that award was changed to one for Best Editor in the early 1970s; the Best Semi-Professional Magazine award can go to either a news-oriented magazine or a small press fiction magazine.

Magazines were the only way to publish science fiction until about 1950, when large mainstream publishers began issuing science fiction books. Today, there are relatively few paper-based science fiction magazines, and most printed science fiction appears first in book form. Science fiction magazines began in the United States, but there were several major British magazines and science fiction magazines that have been published around the world, for example in France and Argentina.

== First science fiction magazines ==
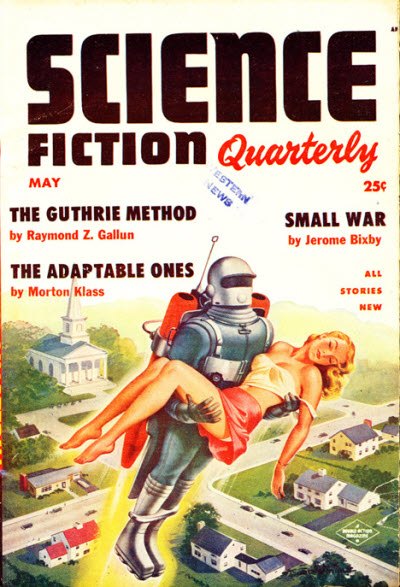
Cover of Science Fiction Quarterly, an American pulp science fiction magazine. May 1954

The first science fiction magazine, Amazing Stories, was published in a format known as bedsheet, roughly the size of Life but with a square spine. Later, most magazines changed to the pulp magazine format, roughly the size of comic books or National Geographic but again with a square spine. Now, most magazines are published in digest format, roughly the size of Reader's Digest, although a few are in the standard roughly 8.5" x 11" size, and often have stapled spines, rather than glued square spines. Science fiction magazines in this format often feature non-fiction media coverage in addition to the fiction. Knowledge of these formats is an asset when locating magazines in libraries and collections where magazines are usually shelved according to size.

The premiere issue of Amazing Stories (April 1926), edited and published by Hugo Gernsback, displayed a cover by Frank R. Paul illustrating Off on a Comet by Jules Verne. After many minor changes in title and major changes in format, policy and publisher, Amazing Stories ended January 2005 after 607 issues.

Except for the last issue of Stirring Science Stories, the last true bedsheet size sf (and fantasy) magazine was Fantastic Adventures, in 1939, but it quickly changed to the pulp size, and it was later absorbed by its digest-sized stablemate Fantastic in 1953. Before that consolidation, it ran 128 issues.

Much fiction published in these bedsheet magazines, except for classic reprints by writers such as H. G. Wells, Jules Verne and Edgar Allan Poe, is only of antiquarian interest. Some of it was written by teenage science fiction fans, who were paid little or nothing for their efforts. Jack Williamson for example, was 19 when he sold his first story to Amazing Stories. His writing improved greatly over time, and until his death in 2006, he was still a publishing writer at age 98.

Some of the stories in the early issues were by scientists or doctors who knew little or nothing about writing fiction, but who tried their best, for example, David H. Keller. Probably the two best original sf stories ever published in a bedsheet science fiction magazine were "A Martian Odyssey" by Stanley G. Weinbaum and "The Gostak and the Doshes" by Miles Breuer, who influenced Jack Williamson. "The Gostak and the Doshes" is one of the few stories from that era still widely read today. Other stories of interest from the bedsheet magazines include the first Buck Rogers story, Armageddon 2419 A.D, by Philip Francis Nowlan, and The Skylark of Space by coauthors E. E. Smith and Mrs. Lee Hawkins Garby, both in Amazing Stories in 1928.

There have been a few unsuccessful attempts to revive the bedsheet size using better quality paper, notably Science-Fiction Plus edited by Hugo Gernsback (1952–53, eight issues). Astounding on two occasions briefly attempted to revive the bedsheet size, with 16 bedsheet issues in 1942–1943 and 25 bedsheet issues (as Analog, including the first publication of Frank Herbert's Dune) in 1963–1965. The fantasy magazine Unknown, also edited by John W. Campbell, changed its name to Unknown Worlds and published ten bedsheet-size issues before returning to pulp size for its final four issues. Amazing Stories published 36 bedsheet size issues in 1991–1999, and its last three issues were bedsheet size, 2004–2005.

== Pulp era ==
Astounding Stories began in January 1930. After several changes in name and format (Astounding Science Fiction, Analog Science Fact & Fiction, Analog) it is still published today (though it ceased to be pulp format in 1943). Its most important editor, John W. Campbell, Jr., is credited with turning science fiction away from adventure stories on alien planets and toward well-written, scientifically literate stories with better characterization than in previous pulp science fiction. Isaac Asimov's Foundation Trilogy and Robert A. Heinlein's Future History in the 1940s, Hal Clement's Mission of Gravity in the 1950s, and Frank Herbert's Dune in the 1960s, and many other science fiction classics all first appeared under Campbell's editorship.

By 1955, the pulp era was over, and some pulp magazines changed to digest size. Printed adventure stories with colorful heroes were relegated to the comic books. This same period saw the end of radio adventure drama (in the United States). Later attempts to revive both pulp fiction and radio adventure have met with very limited success, but both enjoy a nostalgic following who collect the old magazines and radio programs. Many characters, most notably The Shadow, were popular both in pulp magazines and on radio.

Most pulp science fiction consisted of adventure stories transplanted, without much thought, to alien planets. Pulp science fiction is known for clichés such as stereotypical female characters, unrealistic gadgetry, and fantastic monsters of various kinds. However, many classic stories were first published in pulp magazines. For example, in the year 1939, all of the following renowned authors sold their first professional science fiction story to magazines specializing in pulp science fiction: Isaac Asimov, Robert A. Heinlein, Arthur C. Clarke, Alfred Bester, Fritz Leiber, A. E. van Vogt and Theodore Sturgeon. These were among the most important science fiction writers of the pulp era, and all are still read today.

== Digest-sized magazines ==
After the pulp era, digest size magazines dominated the newsstand. The first sf magazine to change to digest size was Astounding, in 1943. Other major digests, which published more literary science fiction, were The Magazine of Fantasy & Science Fiction, Galaxy Science Fiction and If. Under the editorship of Cele Goldsmith, Amazing and Fantastic changed in notable part from pulp style adventure stories to literary science fiction and fantasy. Goldsmith published the first professionally published stories by Roger Zelazny (not counting student fiction in Literary Cavalcade), Keith Laumer, Thomas M. Disch, Sonya Dorman and Ursula K. Le Guin.

There was also no shortage of digests that continued the pulp tradition of hastily written adventure stories set on other planets. Other Worlds and Imaginative Tales had no literary pretensions. The major pulp writers, such as Heinlein, Asimov and Clarke, continued to write for the digests, and a new generation of writers, such as Algis Budrys and Walter M. Miller, Jr., sold their most famous stories to the digests. A Canticle for Leibowitz, written by Walter M. Miller, Jr., was first published in The Magazine of Fantasy & Science Fiction.

Most digest magazines began in the 1950s, in the years between the film Destination Moon, the first major science fiction film in a decade, and the launching of Sputnik, which sparked a new interest in space travel as a real possibility. Most survived only a few issues. By 1960, in the United States, there were only six sf digests on newsstands, in 1970 there were seven, in 1980 there were five, in 1990 only four and in 2000 only three.

== Transition from print to online science fiction magazines ==
During recent decades, the circulation of all digest science fiction magazines has steadily decreased. New formats were attempted, most notably the slick-paper stapled magazine format, the paperback format and the webzine. There are also various semi-professional magazines that persist on sales of a few thousand copies but often publish important fiction.

Around the turn of the millennium, online science fiction magazines began to published and gain significant readership. Among the first were Strange Horizons and Sci Fiction, both of which began publishing in the year 2000. Strange Horizons was founded by writer and editor Mary Anne Mohanraj and pioneered a not-for-profit publishing model by being a 501(c)(3) non-profit organization. In 2024, Strange Horizons won the Hugo Award for Best Semiprozine.

Sci Fiction was published by Syfy (then called the Sci-Fi Channel) and ran for six years until 2005, winning a Hugo Award for Best Website. During this time stories published in Sci Fiction won multiple awards, including the very first Nebula Award presented to an online-published story. The magazine also helped raise the overall status of online-published fiction and has been said to have achieved for online magazines what Astounding Magazine did six decades earlier for print SF magazines.

== Around the world ==
=== British science fiction magazines ===
The first British science fiction magazine was Tales of Wonder, pulp size, 1937–1942, 16 issues, (unless Scoops is taken into account, a tabloid boys' paper that published 20 weekly issues in 1934). It was followed by two magazines, both named Fantasy, one pulp size publishing three issues in 1938–1939, the other digest size, publishing three issues in 1946–1947. The British science fiction magazine, New Worlds, published three pulp size issues in 1946–1947, before changing to digest size. With these exceptions, the pulp phenomenon, like the comic book, was largely a US format. By 2007, the only surviving major British science fiction magazine was Interzone, published in "magazine" format, although small press titles such as PostScripts and Polluto are available.

=== Science Fiction World and other international magazines ===
As the circulation of the traditional US science fiction magazines has declined, new magazines have sprung up online from international small-press publishers. An editor on the staff of Science Fiction World, China's longest-running science fiction magazine, claimed in 2009 that, with "a circulation of 300,000 copies per issue", it was "the World's most-read SF periodical", although subsequent news suggests that circulation dropped precipitously after the firing of its chief editor in 2010 and the departure of other editors. The Science Fiction and Fantasy Writers of America lists science fiction periodicals that pay enough to be considered professional markets.

== List of current magazines ==
For a complete list, including defunct magazines, see List of science fiction magazines.

=== American magazines ===
- Abyss & Apex Magazine, 2003–present
- Analog Science Fiction and Fact (a.k.a. Astounding Stories, Astounding Science-Fiction and Analog Science Fact & Fiction), 1930–present
- Apex Magazine, 2005–present
- Aphelion the Webzine of Science Fiction and Fantasy, 1997–present
- Ares Magazine (New Edition), 2017–present (Based on defunct magazine Ares)
- Asimov's Science Fiction (a.k.a. Isaac Asimov's Science Fiction Magazine), 1977–present
- Bards and Sages Quarterly, 2009–present
- Bull Spec, 2009–present
- Clarkesworld Magazine, 2006–present
- Compelling Science Fiction, 2016–present
- Daily Science Fiction, 2010–present
- Escape Pod, 2005–present, fiction podcast and online
- FIYAH Literary Magazine, 2016-present
- The Future Fire, 2005–present, US/UK
- Galaxy's Edge Magazine, 2013–present
- GUD Magazine 2006–present, print/pdf
- Hypnos, 2012–present
- Illuminations of the Fantastic (online, 2020–current)
- InterGalactic Medicine Show, 2005–2019
- Leading Edge (a.k.a. The Leading Edge Magazine of Science Fiction and Fantasy), 1981–present
- Lightspeed, 2010–present
- Locus: The Magazine of The Science Fiction & Fantasy Field, 1968–present
- The Magazine of Fantasy & Science Fiction (a.k.a. The Magazine of Fantasy), 1949–present
- Nebula Rift, 2012–present
- Not one of us, 1986–present
- Perihelion Science Fiction, 1967–1969, revived 2012–present
- Planet Magazine, 1994–present
- Planetary Stories, 2005–present
- Quantum Muse E-Zine, 1997–present
- Reactor (magazine) (formerly Tor.com), 2008–present
- Shimmer Magazine, 2005–2018
- Space Adventure Magazine, 2011–present
- Space and Time Magazine, 1966–present
- Strange Horizons, 2000–present
- Three-lobed Burning Eye, 1999–present
- Uncanny Magazine, 2014–present
- Unfit Magazine, 2018–present
- Waylines Magazine, 2013–present – US/Japan
- Weird Tales, 1923–1954, revived 1988–present

=== British magazines ===
- Arc, 2012–present
- Doctor Who Magazine, 1979–present
- Fever Dreams Magazine, online publication 2012–present
- The Future Fire, 2005–present – US/UK
- Interzone, 1982–present
- SFX, 1995–present
- Starburst, 1977–present

=== Other magazines ===
- Albedo One, 1993–present, Ireland
- Andromeda Spaceways Inflight Magazine, 2002–present, Australia
- Aurealis, 1990–present, Australia
- Fantastyka (also known as Nowa Fantastyka), 1982–present, Poland
- Futura, 1992–present, Croatia
- Galaktika, 1972–1995, revived 2004–present, Hungary
- Helice, 2006–present, Spain-Latin America
- Kalpabiswa, 2016–present, India
- Mir Fantastiki, 2003–present, Russia
- Mithila Review, 2016–present, India
- Neo-opsis Science Fiction Magazine, 2003–present, Canada (English)
- NewFoundSpecFic, 2009–present, Canada (English)
- Nova Science Fiction, 1982–1987, revived 2004–present, Sweden
- On Spec, 1989–present, Canada (English)
- Quarber Merkur, Austria
- Portti, 1982–present, Finland
- RBG-Azimuth, 2006–present, Ukraine
- Roket, 2023–present, Turkey
- Science Fiction World, 1979–present, China
- Sci Phi Journal, 2014–present, Belgium
- Sci-Fi Ireland, 2026–present, Ireland
- SF Magazine, 1959–present, Japan
- Sirius B, 2011–present, Croatia
- Small World City, 2023–present, Bangladesh
- Solaris, 1974–present, Canada (French)
- Tähtivaeltaja, 1982–present, Finland
- Ubiq, 2007–present, Croatia
- Universe Pathways, 2005–present, Greece
- Urania, 1952–present, Italy
- Usva webzine, 2005–present, Finland

== See also ==
- Fantasy fiction magazine
- George Kelley Paperback and Pulp Fiction Collection
- Horror fiction magazine
- Science fiction fanzine
