= Najib Tareque =

Bengali artist and printmaker

- নাজিব তারেক
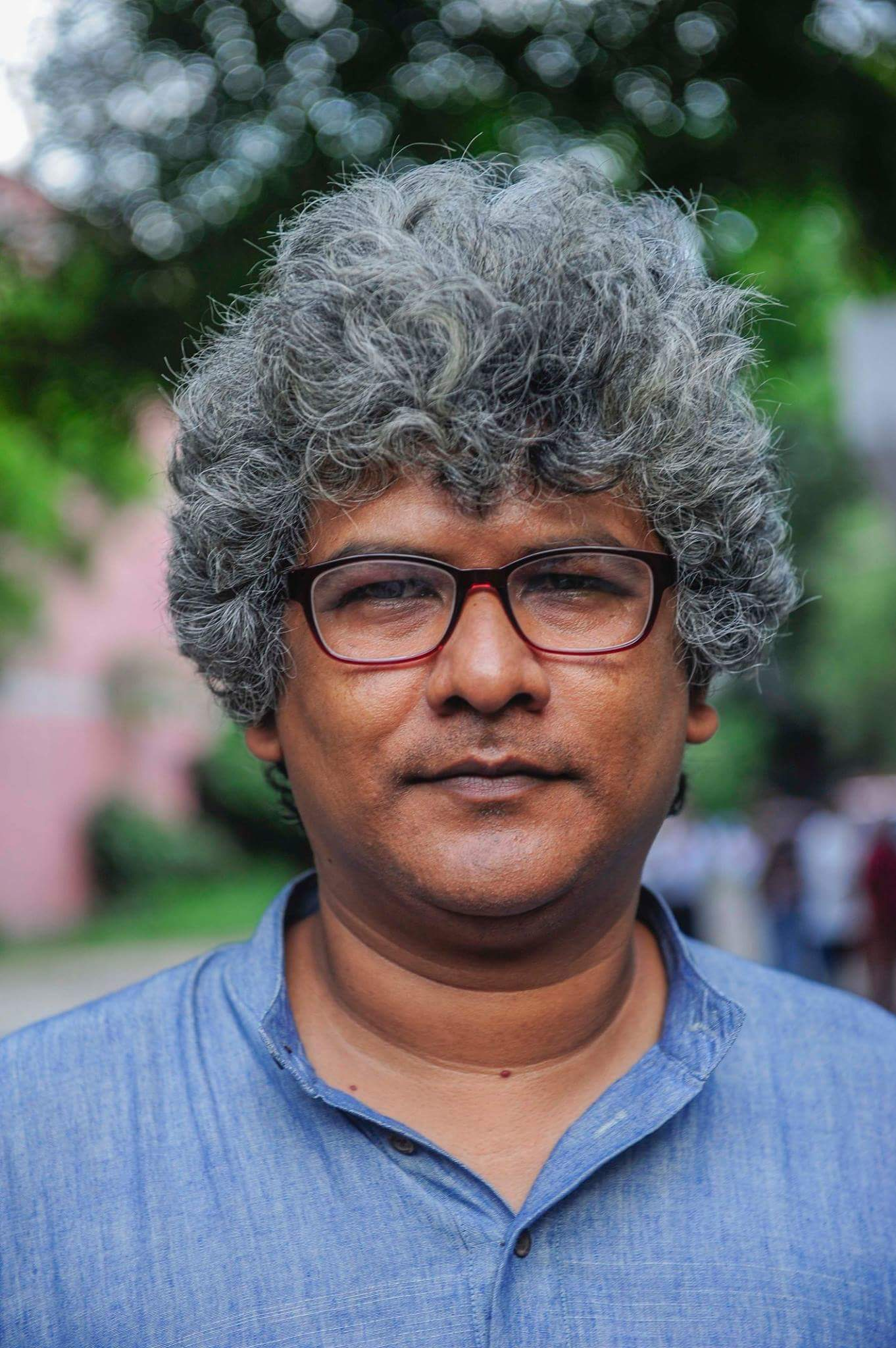
- Tareque in 2017
- Born: Abu Najib Mohammed Tareque; September 5, 1970 (age 56); Dinajpur, East Pakistan
- Education: MFA
- Alma mater: University of Dhaka
- Occupations: Artist; printmaker; writer
- Years active: 1987–present
- Style: New media
- Spouse: Farhana Afroz Bappy
- Children: 2

Najib Tareque (born September 5, 1970, as Abu Najib Mohammed Tareque) is a Bengali artist, printmaker and writer based in Dhaka, Bangladesh. He is best known for his new media artworks and being one of the pioneers of online art galleries in Bangladesh. Tareque was the founding member of Jolrong, one of the first online art galleries in South Asia. Since 1987, he has been part of various group and solo exhibitions both in the country and abroad. He has participated in more than twenty individual and joint exhibitions in the country and abroad.

In 1998 he was awarded by the Forest Department of the Ministry of Environment, Forest and Climate Change.

== Early life ==
Abu Najib Mohammad Tareque was born on September 5, 1970, in Borogur Gola, Dinajpur, East Pakistan (now Bangladesh). His father was Tamizuddin and his mother Nujratun Nisa. Tareque is the fifth among seven siblings. Due to his father's career, his childhood and early life were in Thakurgaon, Rajshahi and in Dinajpur district.

His early education began in the village's school. After completing his Secondary School Certificate exams at Rajshahi Collegiate School in 1986, he studied at Dinajpur Government College. In 1987, he started studying printmaking in the Faculty of Fine Arts of the University of Dhaka. He graduated in 1994 and completed post graduate study in 2000 from the faculty. Whilst a student, he acted in the anti-autocracy movement, and for the Nirmul Committee.

== Career ==
Tareque worked as a chief artist for national newspapers, including Daily Jugantor from 1999 to 2001 and Daily Janakantha from 2002 to 2004. He also worked with Ekushey Television from 2001 to 2003. From 2004 to 2011, he was appointed as a brand marketing consultant of the Standard Chartered Bank Limited in Dhaka. Besides, he has been appointed as the Information Technology Secretary of the Bangladesh Charushilpi Sangsad.

== Works ==
The birth of art is in the deepest part of the brain death is also there. An art piece is the skeleton of art. In the sells market, art is not sold, the skeleton of art is sold there. The buyer builds up his own taste by buying art pieces. A child creates art in order to prove its existence. Without expression, it has no other way to prove its existence. With the growth of age, its fact of expression grows more. According to the clash of different opposite fact, the child gets attracted by different social rules & regulation, in addition to that, sexual role or the recreating power which is to preserve the existence or creativity hides his spontaneous form of expression. Social existence becomes like his own existence when he feels that he and the society are the different forms of the same existence, he is the unit of the society, his creativity becomes spontaneous again. Abstraction is not a style. The soul of art is found in abstraction. The extremely delicate angle of vision creates abstract art or breaks down the temporary impenetrable wall. God is the symbol of loving urge, sexuality is the proof of creativity.

—

Tareque is mainly a printmaker. However, he did numerous work in the several mediums including oil, water, and acrylic, but he mostly on the mix-media. Tareque's earlier works highlighted nature, structure, figures, sketches, and portrait became the subject of his paintings. His portraits and figures are considered as semi-realistic and often surrealistic or impressionistic. Most of his paintings have vibrant colours, and the backgrounds feature dominant movement. Initially, a multivariate fragility was noted in his paintings, which often recall the works of Fauvist artists. Paul Klee's paintings are often remembered when analyzing the space and intention of Tareque's painting "Antarer Anusandhan" and "Naree Banam Naree". Tareque has often used the Arabic alphabet and the use of words in the art of painting. Tareque has attempted to create his own art form by synthesizing various painting doctrines rather than following a specific one. There is a logical appreciation about the life of artist Tareque in the opening words: "God is amorphous, inactive, and absolute emptiness, religions are the historic events for the human society, which increasingly becoming history. Those who have a lack of knowledge of history are either religious, maybe anti-religious, or antipathetic."

In 1994, two of his solo exhibitions were organized. "Joy Manabata" is his first solo exhibition which was held in May 1994 with Alliance Française in Dhaka. Most of the 42 paintings of the exhibition were the subject matter of the human. Where the human form has been depicted in the form of Durga, Nomad, Ravana, Ullas, etc. Some paintings of Tareque, who believe in the Evolution theory, are found in the resemblance of the non-human face with the human body, through which he has expressed his desire to illustrate the ugly image of the human.

In 2009, he participated in the group exhibition held in Mumbai, India. He got acquainted with the illustration of book covers and literary magazines, fashion design, etc. In Bangladesh, he tried to turn the traditional illustrations of the book covers into modern art.

In 2015, Tareque took the initiative to create an artists' hub and launched a gallery, Studio 6/6, in Mohammadpur, Dhaka, with his daughter, Taiara Farhana Tareque, as co-founder. After its initial launch, the studio has hosted several exhibitions, workshops, and events featuring artists with different talents, such as musicians, painters, and writers.

=== "Art Makes Us Human" ===
Art Makes Us Human

Online-based conceptual virtual art project Art Makes Us Human starts since July 2015 through the social media Instagram. Later in May 2016, a solo exhibition of the project was organized in the Studio 6/6 Gallery located in Dhaka. It was the first physical exhibition of its kind in the country, featuring approximately 15 prints of digital paintings. As a part of the project, Tareque composed his old and new combination of decoration, using many of his previously drawn illustrations for various books, newspapers and magazines. The colourful artworks mostly used bold strokes, striking colours and enthralling patterns to create human faces and figures, birds and different geometric forms. Since its online launching nearly more than 1500 artworks have been published under the project, in various social media including Instagram, Pinterest, Tumblr, and Facebook.

== Personal life ==
Najib married Bangladeshi painter Farhana Afroz Bappy. They have a daughter, Taiara Farhana Tareque (born 1994), who is also a young artist, and a son, Farhand Abu Tamjiad. In 2015, the artist family launched Studio 6/6, an art space based in Dhaka.

In April 2017, a joint exhibition of this couple was organized in Dhaka at their own art gallery named Studio 6/6 under the heading "Nirman" ("Construction").

== Notable exhibitions ==
=== Solo exhibition ===
Date	Exhibition	Venue	Ref.
May, 1994	Joy Manabata	Alliance Française de Dhaka	
9–15 September 1994	Joy of Humanity	Jojon Art Gallery, Dhaka	
January, 2003	What is Art	Webcity, Dhaka	
August, 2010	Iqra—A Painter's Salute to Reading	Impressions Gallery, Gulshan, Dhaka	
August, 2011	Ikra and Others	Impressions Gallery	
April, 2011	Story of Story Telling	Impressions Gallery	
2015	Anybody Can Do It, Please Do It		
15–25 May 2016	Art Makes Us Human	Studio 6/6, Dhaka	
29 November - 10 December 2019	Anybody Can Do It, Please Do It	Dwip Gallery, Lalmatia	

=== Joint exhibitions ===
Year	Exhibition	Venue	Co-artists	Ref.
1989	Nine Young Artist	Goethe-Institut Dhaka		
1991	Zainul Utshab 1991	Faculty of Fine Arts, University of Dhaka		
1991	20 Years of Victory	Faculty of Fine Arts, University of Dhaka		
1991	Expression '91	Bangladesh National Museum, Dhaka		
1991	Exhibition of 101 Artist	Faculty of Fine Arts, University of Dhaka		
1991	Greater Dinajpur Artist, Expression 1991	Lokbhaban, Dinajpur		
1991	1st Contemporary Young Artist Exhibit 1991	Bangladesh National Museum, Dhaka		
1992	Zainul Utshab 1992	Faculty of Fine Arts, University of Dhaka		
1992	2nd Contemporary Young Artist' Exhibition 1992	Bangladesh Shilpakala Academy, Dhaka		
1992	Obsession Group Show	Jahangirnagar University		
1992	Tenth National Artist Show 1992	Bangladesh Shilpakala Academy, Dhaka		
1993	Zainul Utshab 1993	Faculty of Fine Arts, University of Dhaka		
1993	Greater Dinajpur Artist, Expression 1993	Dinajpur High School, Dinajpur		
1993	National Miniature Art Exhibition 1993	Gallery Tone, Dhaka		
1993	6th Asian Art Biennale Bangladesh 1996	Bangladesh Shilpakala Academy, Dhaka		
2016, August 19–31	Art Against Terrorism: Brave Heart	Gallery Cosmos, Dhaka	35 individuals (Note: The participating artists are Samarjit Roy Choudhury, Hamiduzzaman Khan, Kalidas Karmakar, Tajul Islam, Abdul Mannan, Biren Shome, Alakesh Ghosh, Shahabuddin Ahamed, Farida Zaman, Naima Haque, Nasir Ali Mamun, Kuhu Plamondon, Nasim Ahmed Nadvi, Jamal Ahamed, Nasreen Begum, Rezaun Nabi, Rokeya Sultana, Ivy Zaman, Vaskor Rasha, Syed Hasan Mahmud, Ahmed Shamsuddoha, Sheikh Afzal, Shishir Bhattacharjee, Saidul Haque Juise, Shameem Subrana, Fareha Zeba, Nisar Hossain, Moniruzzaman Monir, Atia Islam Anne, Gulshan Hossain, Kanak Chanpa Chakma, Afrozaa Jamil Konka, Nasima Khanam Queenie, Samiran Chowdhruy, Amirul Momanin Chowdhury, Proshanta Karmakar, Rafi Haque, Md. Jashim Uddin, Rashid Amin, Pradyut Kumar Das, Mustafa Zaman, Aloptogin Tushar, Sufia Begum, Najib Tareque, Bipasha Hayat, Kingshuk Das Chowdhury, Anisuzzaman Anis, Sharbari Roy Choudhury, Shahjahan Ahmed Bikash, Dheeman Kumar Biswas, Shulekha Chowdhury, A. H. Dhali Tomal, Anukul Chandra Mojumder, Nazia Andaleeb Preema, Ronni Ahmmed, Maksuda Iqbal Nipa, Azmeer Hossain, Ruhul Karim Rumee, Sohel Pranon, Abdus Sattar Toufiq, Abdul Guffar Babu, Kamaluddin, Devdas Malakar, Bishwajit Goswami, Shohag Parvez, Ruhul Amin Tarek, Md. Azmal Uddin, Nazir Hossain, Abdullah Al Bashir, Ratneshwar Shutradhar, Anisuzzaman Mamun, Kamruzzoha, Monjur Rashid, Shahanoor Mamun, Sourav Chowdhury, Abir Shome, Iqbal Bahar Chy, Dilip Kumar Karmakar and Farhad Hossain.)	
2017, May 6–15	Nirman	Studio 6/6, Dhaka	Farhana Afroz	
2017, May 6–18,	Oboyobi	Studio 6/6, Dhaka	Farhana Afroz	
2020, May 8–31,	Mrinmoy Art Gallery	Online Art Exhibition, Chittagong		

=== Cover illustrations ===
- Ghorer Latim Ar Sutar Jaymity Dhaka Tolpet (2010)
- Bokkhapinjor Bonam Ostho Ar Chokhbondher Kobita (2015)
- And Those Other Ghosts Of Love (2016)
- Ishwarer Sontanera (February 2017; Kotha Prakash)

== Literary works ==
Apart from composing art, Tareque has studied literature; wrote verse, essay, discussion, etc. In 1996, he wrote Kobitar Chitrayon Proshonge about painting and literature, published under the Young Writer' Project of Bangla Academy. He also published two volumes of drawings books for children.

=== Bibliography ===
- Dhil Mari Tor Tiner Chale (1992)
- Kobitar Chitrayon Proshonge (1996, Bangla Academy)
- Maddhomiker Khero Khata (December 2018, Prokriti)

== Awards ==
- 1995 - National Miniature Art Exhibition
- 1995 - UN's 50th Anniversary Youth Artist's Art Competition, Bangladesh Shilpakala Academy
- 1997 - 2nd Berger Painting Award Exhibition
- 1998 - 3rd Berger Painting Award Exhibition
- 1998 - International Miniature Art Exhibition
- 1998 - International Ozone Day Department of Forestry, Ministry of Environment, Forest and Climate Change

== See also ==
- Studio 6/6
- List of Bangladeshi painters
