= Laxmi Narayan Mandir, Dhaka =

Hindu temple in Dhaka, Bangladesh

Coordinates: 23.7157°N 90.4117°E

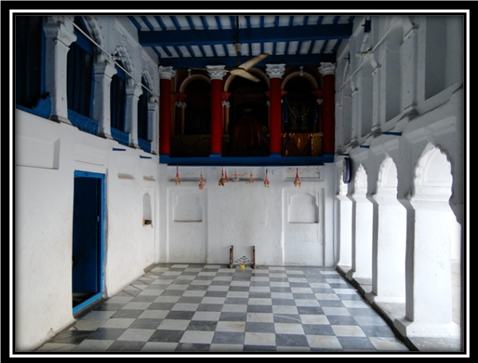
Mandir interior

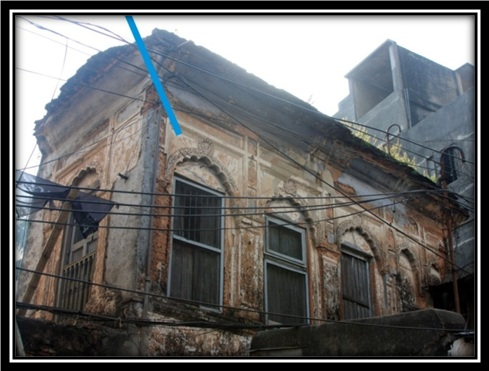
Exterior view of Laaxmi Narayan Mandir

Laxmi Narayan Mandir is a Hindu temple, devoted to Laxmi, the Hindu Goddess of wealth. It is situated at 31 Nawabpur Road in Dhaka, Bangladesh, in Kotwali Thana. The temple is about 300 years old. It was established in the Bengali year of 1056.

The entire temple is adorned with carvings depicting the scenes from Hindu mythology. Inside the boundary of this temple there is a private house. The temple nowadays use as a private temple. It is mainly a two storied temple. There is no dome of this ancient mandir. The whole temple is made out of plaster and is visible from outside. There are pictures of Hindu Gods and Goddesses printed on the tiled walls of the temple. The icons of the temple are in marble brought from Jaipur. The entrance to the temple is welcomed by a Hindu spell which is engraved on a stone. On the other gate of the temple there is a bell. It is a ritual to ring the bell before entering the temple and before leaving.
