= Yusuf Hossain Choudhury =

Bengali politician

Khan Bahadur Yusuf Hossain Choudhury
- ইঊসুফ হোসেন চৌধুরী

Member of the National Assembly of Pakistan
- In office 1962–1965
- Constituency: Kushtia-cum-Faridpur

Member of the Bengal Legislative Assembly
- In office 1946–1947
- Prime Minister: Huseyn Shaheed Suhrawardy
- Preceded by: Tamizuddin Khan
- Succeeded by: Assembly disbanded
- Constituency: Faridpur West

Personal details
- Born: Faridpur district, Bengal Presidency
- Children: Rashid Choudhury

Yusuf Hossain Choudhury was a member of the 3rd National Assembly of Pakistan as a representative of East Pakistan.

== Early life ==
Choudhury was born into a Bengali Muslim family of Choudhuries in Faridpur district, Bengal Presidency.

== Career ==
Choudhury was elected to the Bengal Legislative Assembly for Faridpur West constituency after succeeding at the 1946 elections.

Choudhury was a Member of the 3rd National Assembly of Pakistan. He was a politician of the Muslim League.
