= Portti =

Finnish science fiction magazine

Portti (meaning Gateway in English) is a Finnish science fiction magazine published in Finland.

== History and profile ==
Portti, published since 1982, is famous for its popular annual short story contest, held since 1986. The magazine is published by the Tampere Science Fiction Society. In the 1980s the publisher was the URSA Publishing House.

Its current editor is Raimo Nikkonen, and the magazine releases four issues per year.

== See also ==
- Tähtivaeltaja, published by the Helsinki Science Fiction Club
