= Perihelion Science Fiction =

Science fiction magazine

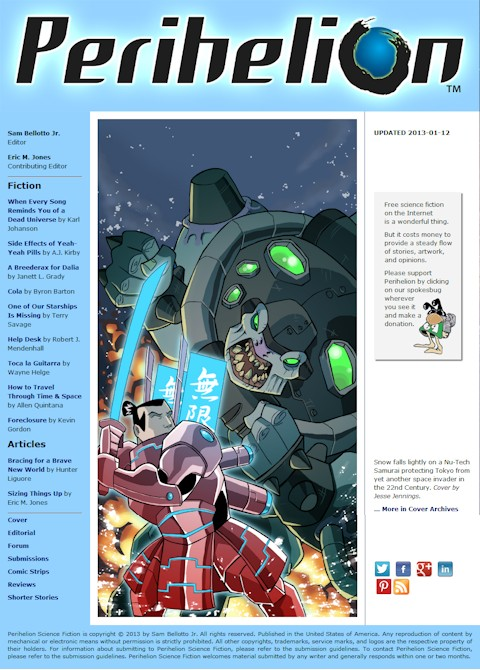
- Editor: Sam Bellotto Jr.
- Contributing Editor: Eric M. Jones
- Categories: science fiction
- Frequency: Monthly
- First issue: November 2012
- Country: United States
- Based in: Rochester, New York
- Language: English
- Website: www.perihelionsf.com
- ISSN: 2328-675X

Perihelion Science Fiction is an American online science fiction magazine specializing in hard science fiction. The first issue was published on November 12, 2012, and it has maintained a regular monthly update schedule since. Perihelion has published fiction by authors such as Joseph Green, Ken Liu, Lela E. Buis, Aliya Whiteley, and Steve Stanton, including articles by National Press Club member John A. McCormick and comic strips and illustrations by Casey Brillon, Christopher Baldwin, and John Waltrip. Sam Bellotto Jr., is the editor and publisher. Eric M. Jones is the associate editor. Perihelion Science Fiction pays semi-professional rates for fiction.

== Formats ==
Perihelion Science Fiction is published as an online webzine on the 12th of each month. Content includes: short fiction; flash fiction; articles; comic strips; reviews of books, movies, and video games; reader feedback; editorials. The five most recent issues are maintained online at all times. The magazine is free to read.

== History ==
Perihelion Science Fiction originated in November 1967. It was photo-offset, 40 pages, in black-and-white. It ran for only five issues. As reported by Mike Ashley in his history of science fiction periodicals, Gateways to Forever, the magazine “presented a mixture of fannish news, articles, and fiction, including a heroic fantasy comic strip, ‘Alaron’ by art editor William Stillwell. Amongst its fiction was work by writers who would soon be selling professionally, including Robert E. Toomey and Evelyn Lief." Further issues of Perihelion (April 1967-Summer 1969) were printed, with a professional style layout, with artwork by Vaughn Bodé and fiction by Dean R Koontz and David R Bunch. Bellotto did not pay contributors, and financial issues the caused closure of the magazine.

Over 40 years later, on November 12, 2012 Perihelion Science Fiction was relaunched as a professional online webzine. It is now a paying market, currently offering one-cent per word. Perihelion has been named one of the five best free Internet science fiction sites by Decades Review. Lois Tilton reviewed the magazine in Locus Online.
