= Studio 6/6 =

Art spaces based in Dhaka

- স্টুডিও ৬/৬
- Interactive map of Studio 6/6
- Full name: Studio Six by Six
- Address: 6/6 Aziz Moholla, Joint Quarter Lane Number 6, Mohammadpur; Dhaka; Bangladesh
- Coordinates: 23.7673°N 90.3609°E
- Owner: Najib Tareque
- Type: Art space
- Events: art; music events

Construction
- Opened: 2015
- Years active: 2015-present

Studio 6/6 (Bengali: স্টুডিও ৬/৬) is an art space, gallery and independent cultural venue in Dhaka, Bangladesh. Co-founded by Bangladeshi artist-printmaker Najib Tareque, Farhana Afroz Bappy and multilateral artist Taiara Farhana Tareque, the studio was launched in 2015.

Initially, Najib Tareque used the studio as his own and his family members. Later, it expanded and started to represent other artists. The studio is located at Mohammadpur in Dhaka.

== Programming ==
The studio has hosted numerous exhibitions, workshops, and events featuring artists, designers, musicians, etc. since 2015. Exhibitions at the studio officially began in 2015 with an exhibition titled "Arts Makes Us Human" by Najib Tareque.

=== Selected exhibitions ===
Exhibitions	Date	Artist(s)	Ref.
Art Makes Us Human	2016, May	Najib Tareque	
Iqra	2016, June	Najib Tareque	
Nirman	2017, May 6–15	Najib Tareque, Farhana Afroz	
Oboyobi	2017, May 6–18	Najib Tareque, Farhana Afroz	
Aak (One)	2019		
Dui	2020		
Water bodies	2020, September	Nabil Rahman	
