= Nawabpur Road =

Roads in Dhaka

- Nawabpur Road (Bangladesh)
- Length: 1 km (0.62 mi)
- Location: Old Dhaka City, Bangladesh
- Coordinates: 23.717866°N 90.411357°E

Nawabpur Road is a road in Old Dhaka City, Bangladesh, and is associated with the Shankhari and Gulistan bazaars. It is a busy road often jammed with rickshaws, human-drawn carts, and foot traffic.

== History ==
Nawabpur was known as Umraha Para. During the Mughal era, diplomats used to reside here, which is how it got its name. Umraha Para was later renamed Nawabpur.

In 1840, it was one of the two main thoroughfares of Dhaka, running north from Sadarghat to Thatari Bazar.

On 22 February 1952, during a Bengali language rally, police fired on marchers killing several including Sofiur Rahman and a nine-year-old boy.

== Amenities ==
The largest market for spare parts in Bangladesh is situated in Nawabpur. There are numerous businesses, including low-cost hotels. Victoria Park, a very ancient and historical site under the name of Andaghar Maidan, is situated at the end of Nawabpur Road.

The fact that the area used to have a Hindu population is shown by the two Hindu temples, named Radha Shyam Mandir and Laxmi Narayan Mandir, situated on the road.

== Photographs ==
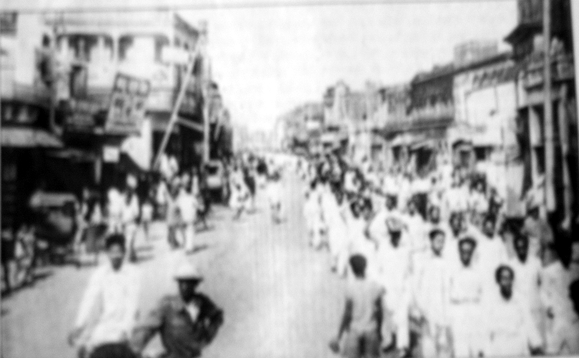
Bengali Language Movement rally, 4 February 1952

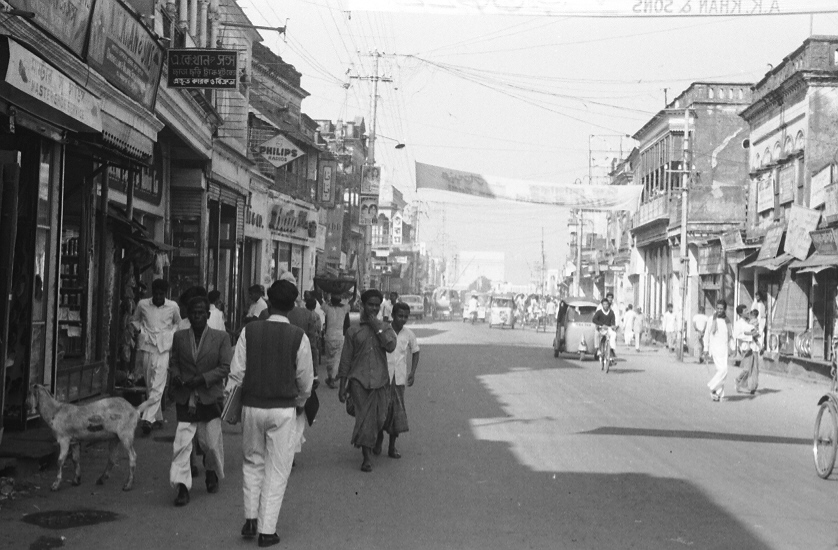
Looking North, 1966

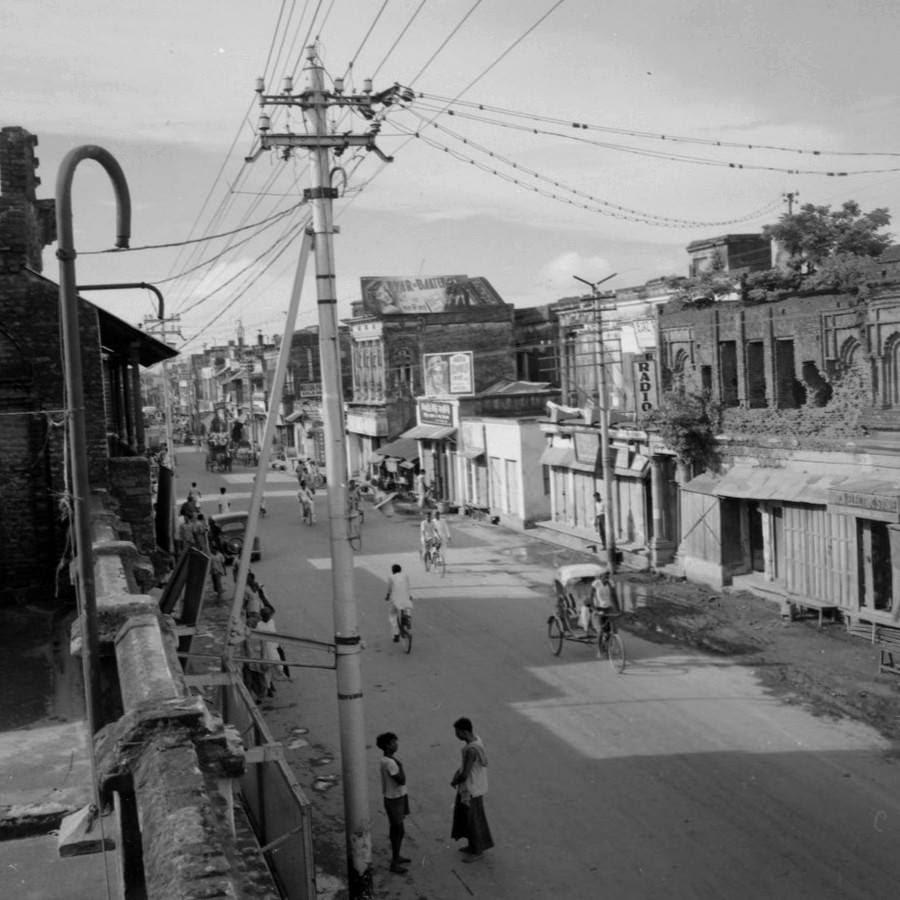
1960s

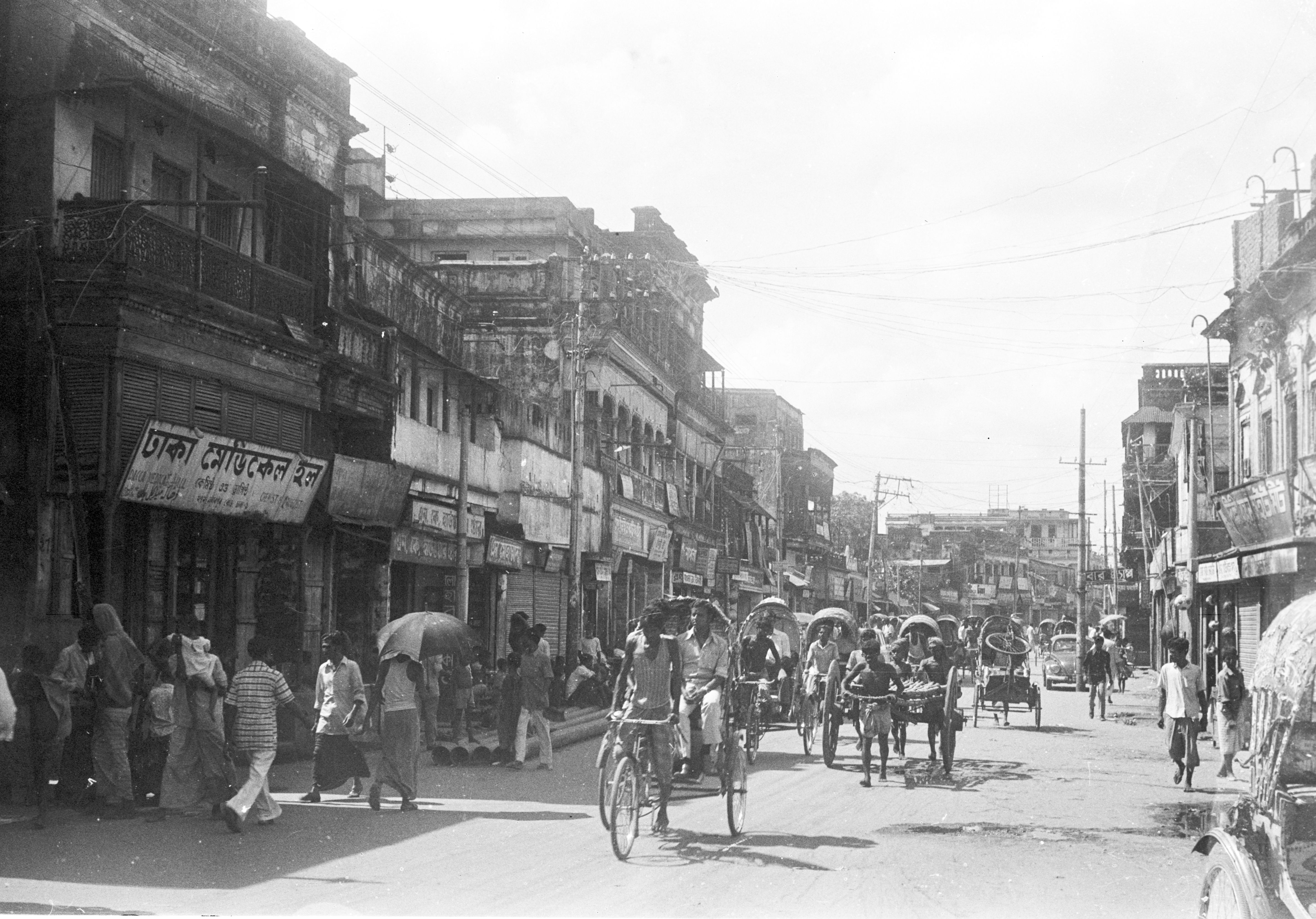
1975

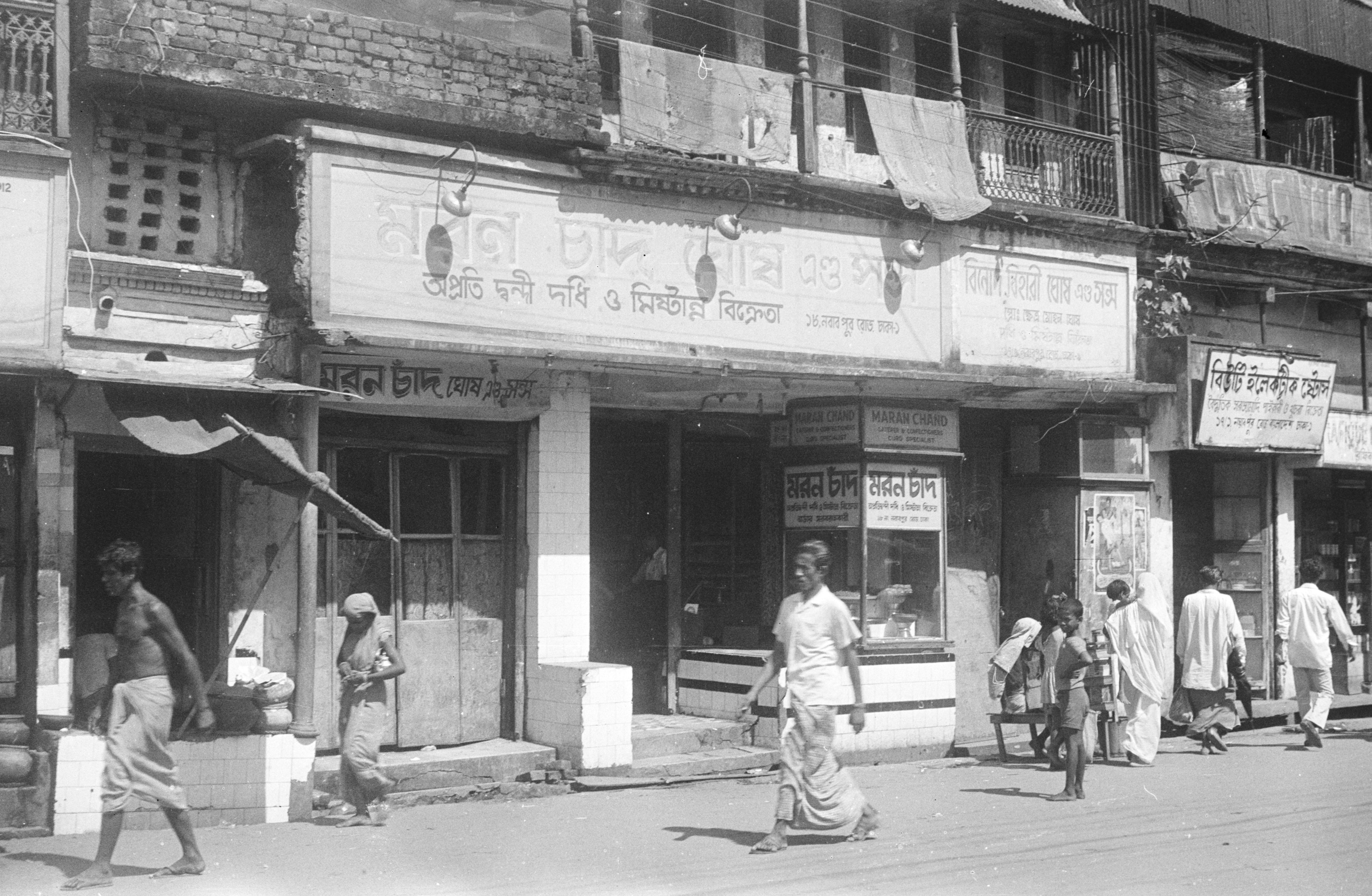
Maran Chand Sweetshop, 1975

== See also ==
- Shankharibazar massacre
- 1964 East-Pakistan riots

== Citations ==
- Al Helal, Bashir (2003). Bhasha Andoloner Itihas (History of the Language Movement) (in Bengali). Dhaka: Agamee Prakashani. ISBN 984-401-523-5.
