= Planet Magazine =

Speculative fiction magazine

Planet Magazine is a free American online fantasy and science fiction magazine by emerging writers and digital artists. It was one of the first illustrated SF publications on the Internet, and has been continuously published since the January–March issue of 1994.

== History ==
Planet was originally published as a quarterly e-zine (electronic magazine) in plain text, DOCMaker (Macintosh only), and later Adobe Acrobat 1.0 formats, the latter two using full color and illustrations. Issues were posted on CompuServe, AOL, eWorld, and various Bulletin Board Services (BBSes). It converted to a webzine (HTML) format in mid-1996 and began using the planetmag.com and planetmagazine.com domain names, originally hosted at GeoCities.com. By about 1997, Planet began using Etext.org as a webhost. In August 2004, Planet moved to a weblog (blog, or maybe "blogzine") format, when it also changed from a quarterly publishing schedule to a more frequent basis. Several issues of Planet have been converted to Palm PDA format.

== Blurb ==
The blurb from the original Planet website:

"Planet is the free, award-winning and groundbreaking electronic magazine of short science fiction and fantasy by emerging writers and illustrators. Our goal is to encourage authors and artists and to just have fun. There could be other, hidden aims, of course, motivations that are obscure and uncomfortable, instincts linked perhaps to primal, nonreasoning urges regarding power and procreation — the very same forces, no doubt, that brought down the Atlanteans and their alabaster-towered oceanic empire. And the Dark Gods laffed...."
