= Tun Abdul Razak National Secondary School =

Tun Abdul Razak National Secondary School Sekolah Menengah Kebangsaan Tun Abdul Razak

Location
- Siburan, Sarawak; Malaysia
- Coordinates: 1°16′34″N 110°25′16″E

Information
- Former names: Dragon Secondary School (1959-1980); Tun Abdul Razak College (Kolej Tun Abdul Razak) (1980-1998)
- Type: secondary, public
- Established: 1959
- School code: YEB1301

Tun Abdul Razak National Secondary School (Malay: Sekolah Menengah Kebangsaan Tun Abdul Razak) is a public secondary school located on the outskirts of Kuching, the capital of the East Malaysian state of Sarawak. It is national secondary school, a government school in which Malay is the main medium of instruction.

== Name ==
The school is initially named as Dragon Secondary School and is believed to have been derived from the hills that surround the school which resemble the coils of a dragon's body. The name is often falsely attributed to the winding road that leads to the school.

== History ==
Tun Abdul Razak National Secondary School was established in 1959 as Dragon Secondary School as part of the Colombo Plan and it was initially administered by the Australian government. From 1967 onwards, the Malaysian Ministry of Education took over the oversight. Sixth form was introduced and it was initially taught by the Volunteer Service Overseas personnel from England, Australia and New Zealand.

On 12 July 1980, Dragon Secondary School was renamed to Kolej Tun Abdul Razak (Tun Abdul Razak College) and finally its current name on 1 January 1999.

== List of Principals ==
- 1959-1963 : Mr. T.A.W. Downing
- 1964-1967 : Mr. J.A. Bunday
- 1968-1969 : Mr. Chai Kui Ho
- 1970 : Mr. Hii Ching Chiong
- 1971-1977 : Mr. Jacob Chacko
- 1978-1982 : Mr. Paul Ngui Sui Lin
- 1982(1 term) : Mr. Bolhan Tahir
- 1983-1987 : Mr. Oliver Katie Dobby
- 1988-2004 : Mr. Gendin Wood
- 2005–present : Dr. Linton @ Jerah Britten

== Achievement ==
- Winner of 2014 National Petrosains Science Competition
- Winner of 2016 National Petrosains Science Competition

== See also ==
- List of schools in Malaysia
