= Md Tokon =

Bangladeshi artist

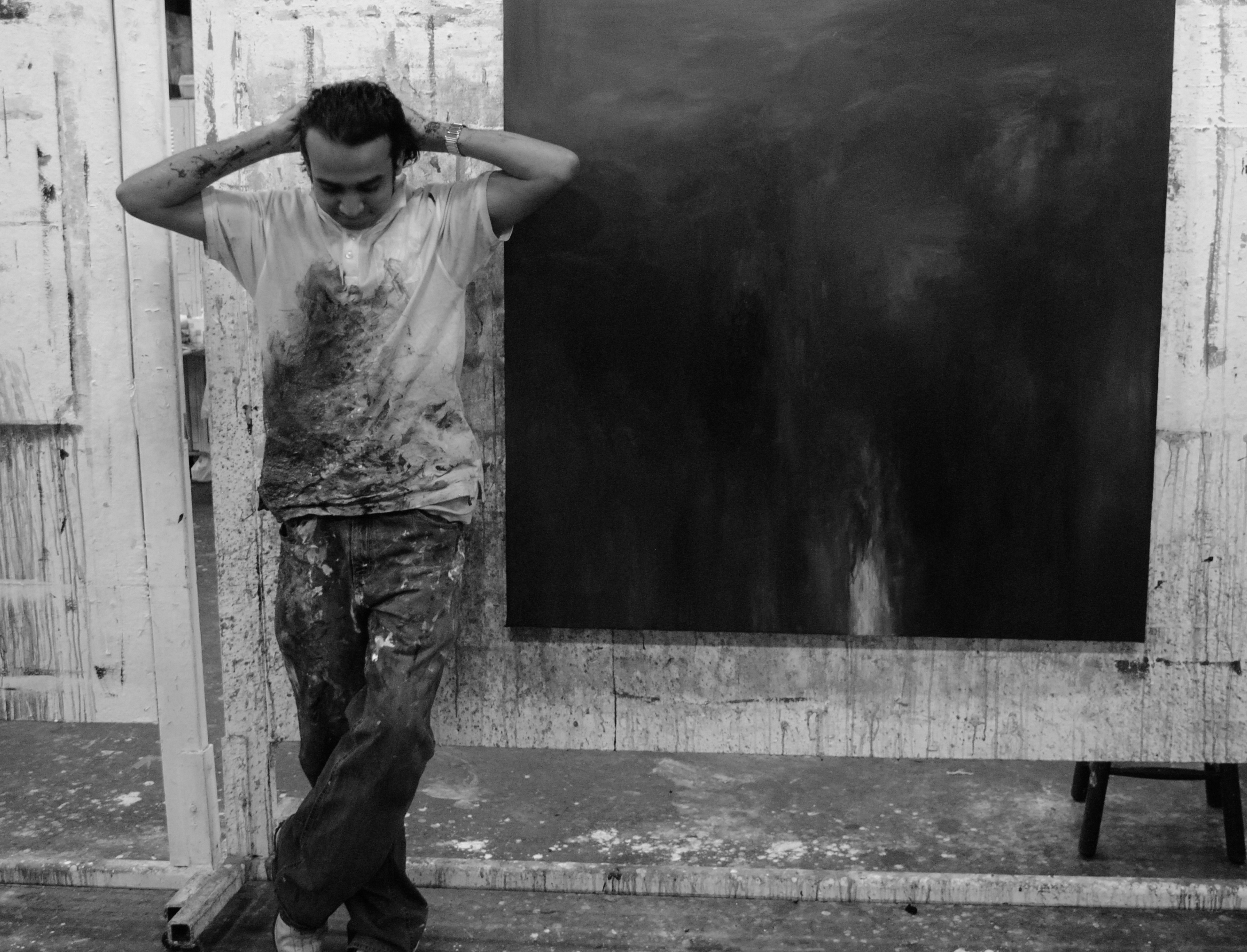
- Tokon at Studio New York
- Born: 1978 (age 47–48)
- Education: The City University of New York
- Occupation: Artist

Md Tokon (born 1978) is a Bangladesh-born artist who moved to New York City in 2000. Tokon's style has reflected the art of American Abstract Expressionists.

== Education and career ==
Md Tokon spent his early years in Jhenidah and Dhaka. He studied at The Institute of Fine Arts, Dhaka University, and moved to New York City in 2001. He obtained his B.A. in Communication Design at The City University of New York.

== Exhibitions ==
Solo Exhibition: 2015: Light Dark Space - Bengal Art Lounge, Bengal Foundation, Dhaka; 2013 IGI Fine Art Westport, Connecticut; 2012: The Depth of Space - Leonard Tourne Gallery, Soho, New York; 2012: Silent Spaces - Bengal Gallery of Fine Arts, Bengal Foundation, Dhaka; 2011: Revelation of Color & Space - Cyrus Company Soho, New York; 2010: Breathing Color - Grace Art Gallery, Grace Institute New York; 2009: Destination Unknown - Tower 49 Sky Lobby Gallery, New York; 2008: Behr-Thyssen Gallery, SOHO TriBeca, New York; 2006: The City University of New York, 2006.

Art Fairs: 2015: Art Southamptopn; 2014: Dhaka Art Summit; 2012: Dhaka Art Summit.

Selected Recent Group Exhibition: 2015: Hammond Museum & Japanese Stroll Garden; Williamsburg Art & Historical Center; Red Dot Show, Phyllis Harriman Mason Gallery, New York;

2014: The John David Mooney Foundation, Chicago; The Arthur M. Berger Art Gallery, New York; Athena Gallery of Fine Arst, Dhaka;

2013: Hammond Museum & Japanese Stroll Garden; The Arthur M. Berger Art Gallery, New York; Flushing town hall, New York;

2012: Crossing Art Gallery, New York; Bronx Charter School for the Arts gallery, New York; Red Dot Show, Phyllis Harriman Mason Gallery, New York; Art Show at Manhattan Borough President Gallery, New York; Lincoln Square Neighborhood Center, New York; 2011: Red Dot Show, Phyllis Harriman Mason Gallery, New York; Aicon Gallery 35 Great Jones St, New York; Jorgensen Gallery, University of Connecticut; Charles B. Wang Center, Stony Brook University, New York; Clareo Partners Sponsors 'Silent Auction Art Show' Chicago, IL; Annual Concours Show at Phyllis Harriman Mason Gallery, New York; 'Small work' Art for Japan, Gallery Studio 57 Fine Arts, New York; Lesley Heller Gallery, New York;

2010: Red Dot Show, Phyllis Harriman Mason Gallery, New York; Representation by Corporate Art, LLC New Jersey & Pennsylvania; Asian Heritage Month Art Show at District Council 37, New York; Annual Concours Show at Phyllis Harriman Mason Gallery, New York; 'Small work' Art Show at Manhattan Borough President Gallery, New York;

2009: Clareo Partners Sponsors 'Silent Auction Art Show' Chicago, IL; Red Dot Show, Phyllis Harriman Mason Gallery, New York; 18th National Art Exhibition at the National Art Gallery, Dhaka, Bangladesh; Annual Concours Show at Phyllis Harriman Mason Gallery, New York; Holiday Art Show at Phyllis Harriman Mason Gallery, the Art Students League of New York; The AfterSputnik Art Project, New York; Sixth Annual NOHO NY ArtWalk, New York;

2008: Clareo Partners Sponsors 'Silent Auction Art Show' Chicago, IL; Holiday Art Show at Phyllis Harriman Mason Gallery, the Art Students League of New York; Juried Art exhibition LG Center 13 St. New York; Group Art Exhibition Antagonist Art Movement Exhibition, New York; Juried 9-11 Group Art Exhibition, East Village, New York; Group Art Exhibition at Bangladesh Embassy Gallery, Washington D.C.;

2007: Senior Project Graphic Design Exhibition Grace Gallery, NYCCT, New York; “Personalities” Group Exhibition at NYCCT, New York; Two man Art Exhibition in Queens College, New York; Group Art Exhibition S. E Fein man Art Gallery, SOHO, New York; Group Art Exhibition, National Museum Gallery Bangladesh;

Lectures/Workshop/Artist Talk/ Panel Discussion: 2011: Artist Talk at Queens Museum of Art, New York; 2011: Panel Discussion Charles B. Wang Center, Stony Brook University, New York; 2010: Lecture & workshop, Grace Institute, New York; 2010: Lecture, Faculty of Fine Arts, Nagpur University, India; 2009-2010: Instructor Ronnie Landfield class Assistant, The Art Students League of New York;
