= Mousse (magazine) =

Italian contemporary art magazine

Mousse is an independent contemporary art magazine based in Milan, Italy. It focuses on international contemporary art and culture, featuring essays, interviews, and exhibition reviews written by prominent critics, curators, and artists.

Mousse was founded in 2006 by Alessio Ascari and Edoardo Bonaspetti. In 2008, the management of the magazine passed entirely to Bonaspetti, who remained in charge until April 2018, when Francesco Tenaglia became editor-in-chief, a role he held until March 2020.
