= Abdur Razzaque Ansari =

Indian nationalist and freedom fighter

Razzaque Ansari (24 January 1917 – 1992) was an Indian nationalist, freedom fighter, and a leader of the weavers' revolution.

== Tributes ==
The Abdur Razzaque Ansari Memorial Hospital was established in his honor by Chotanagpur Regional Handloom Weavers Co-operative Union Ltd and the members of his family in Ranchi in 1996.

On 10 September 2009, Vice-President of India Hamid Ansari inaugurated the Abdur Razzaque Ansari Cancer Institute.
