= Abdul-Razzak Al-Adwani =

Kuwaiti medical doctor

Abdul Razzak Mishari Al Adwani (1927 – 5 July 1996) was a Kuwaiti medical doctor and held various positions, including the minister of public health.

== Biography ==
Adwani was born on 14 February 1928. He was educated in Cairo. He studied medicine in England and graduated from St Bartholomew's Hospital Medical School in London.

He was the minister of public health of Kuwait from 1971 to 1975. He served as the rector of the University of Kuwait from 1980 to 1984.
