= Nobo Kumar Bhadra =

Bangladesh rickshaw painter

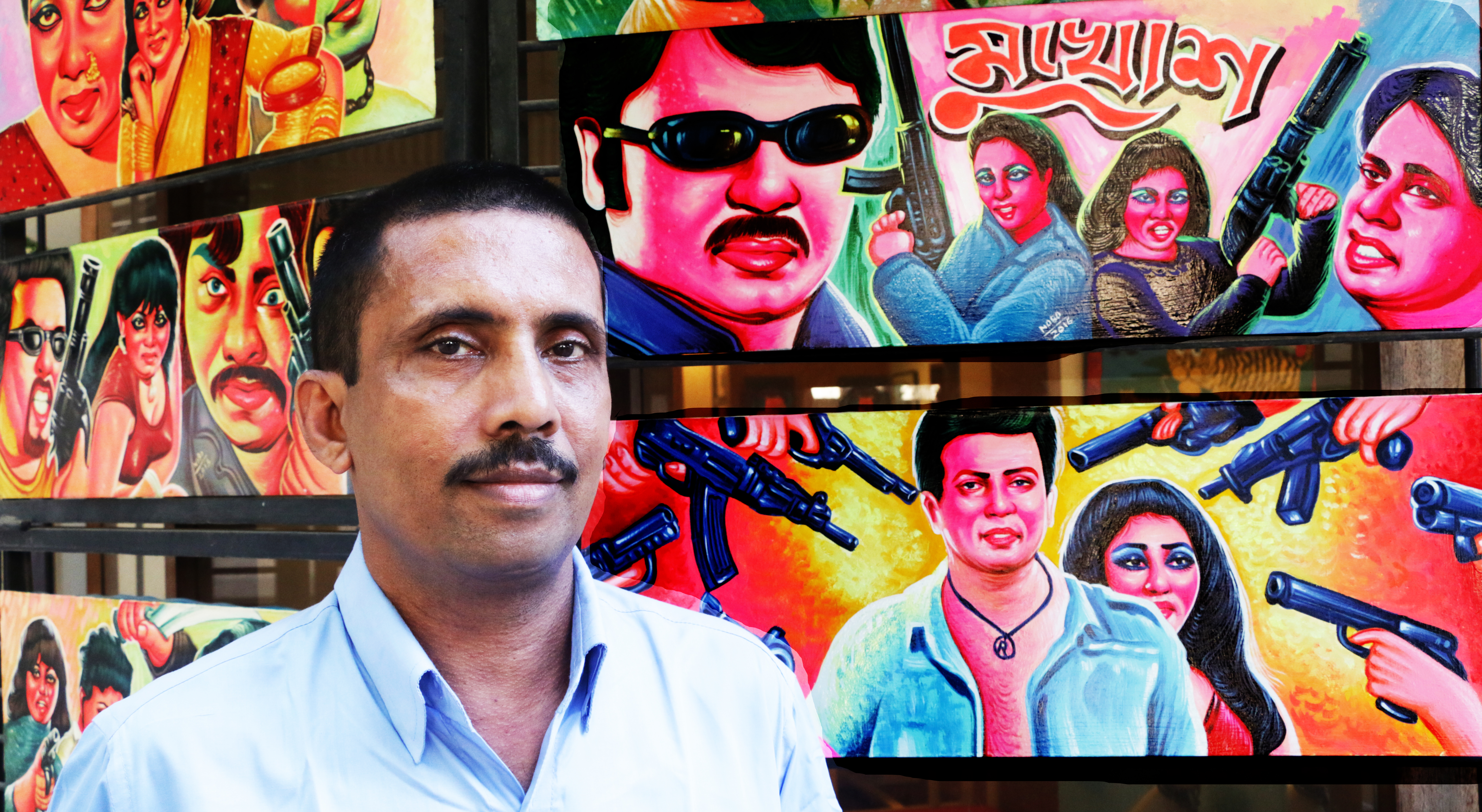
- Born: Dhaka, Bangladesh
- Employer: Alliance Francaise de Dhaka

Nobo Kumar Bhadra (born 1964; Bengali: নব কুমার ভদ্র) is one of the known rickshaw painters of Bangladesh. Rickshaw paint is a traditional folk art of Bangladesh

== Life and work ==
Nobo Kumar was born in Shakhari Bazar, a place in the old town of capital city Dhaka. He started by painting banner for cinema halls along with his father in late 70s Dhaka. Later, his neighbor introduced him to rickshaw painting. Nobo Kumar dropped out of school when he was in grade six. Poverty did not allow him to continue school and he had to start working along with his father in painting banners for cinema halls. Nobo had naturally acquired the sense of color and strokes for which his neighbor, Sitesh Sur, who was a rickshaw painter made him his pupil. Nobo Kumar calls him his ustad or master for rickshaw painting. The neighborhood he was born in has artists of different kind, he could take his painting for selling quite easily. He started his journey in the art world in 1987. He has been in this field for more than 25 years.

== Artworks ==
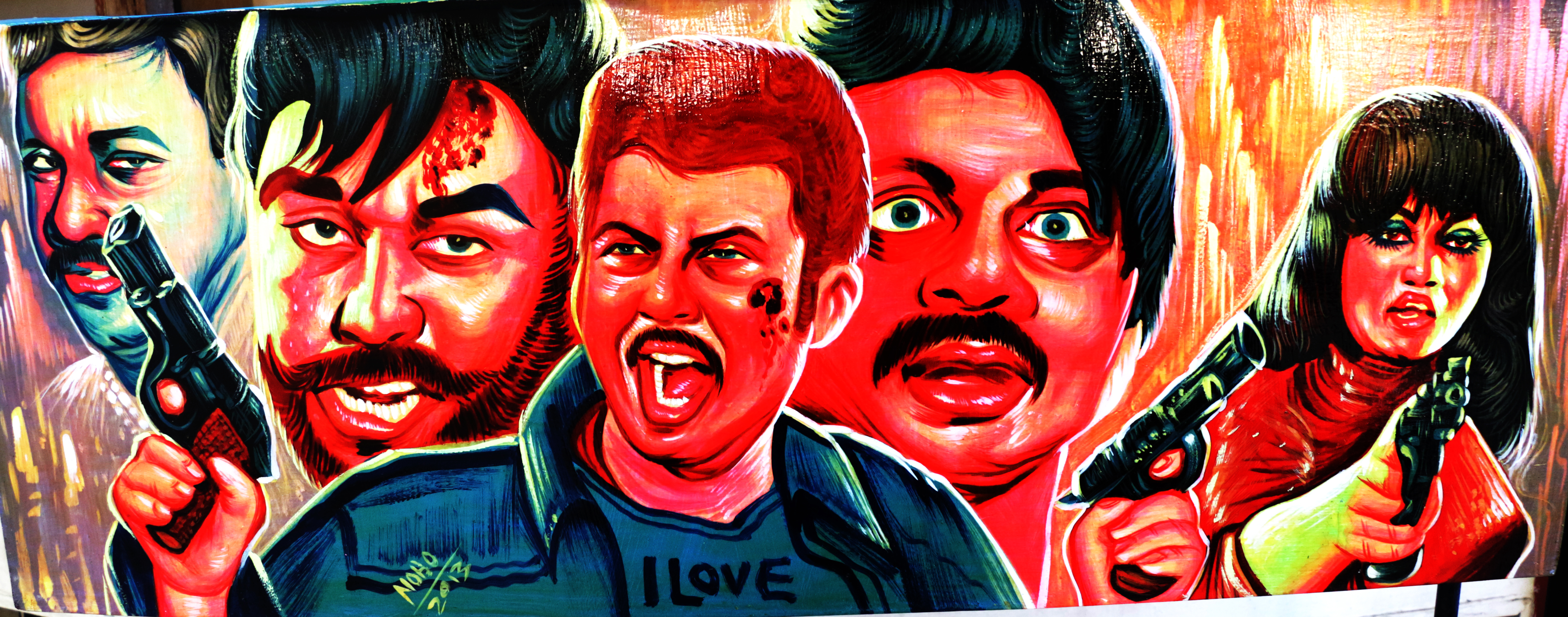
Nobo Kumar Bhadra's Bangladesh Cinema influenced rickshaw art

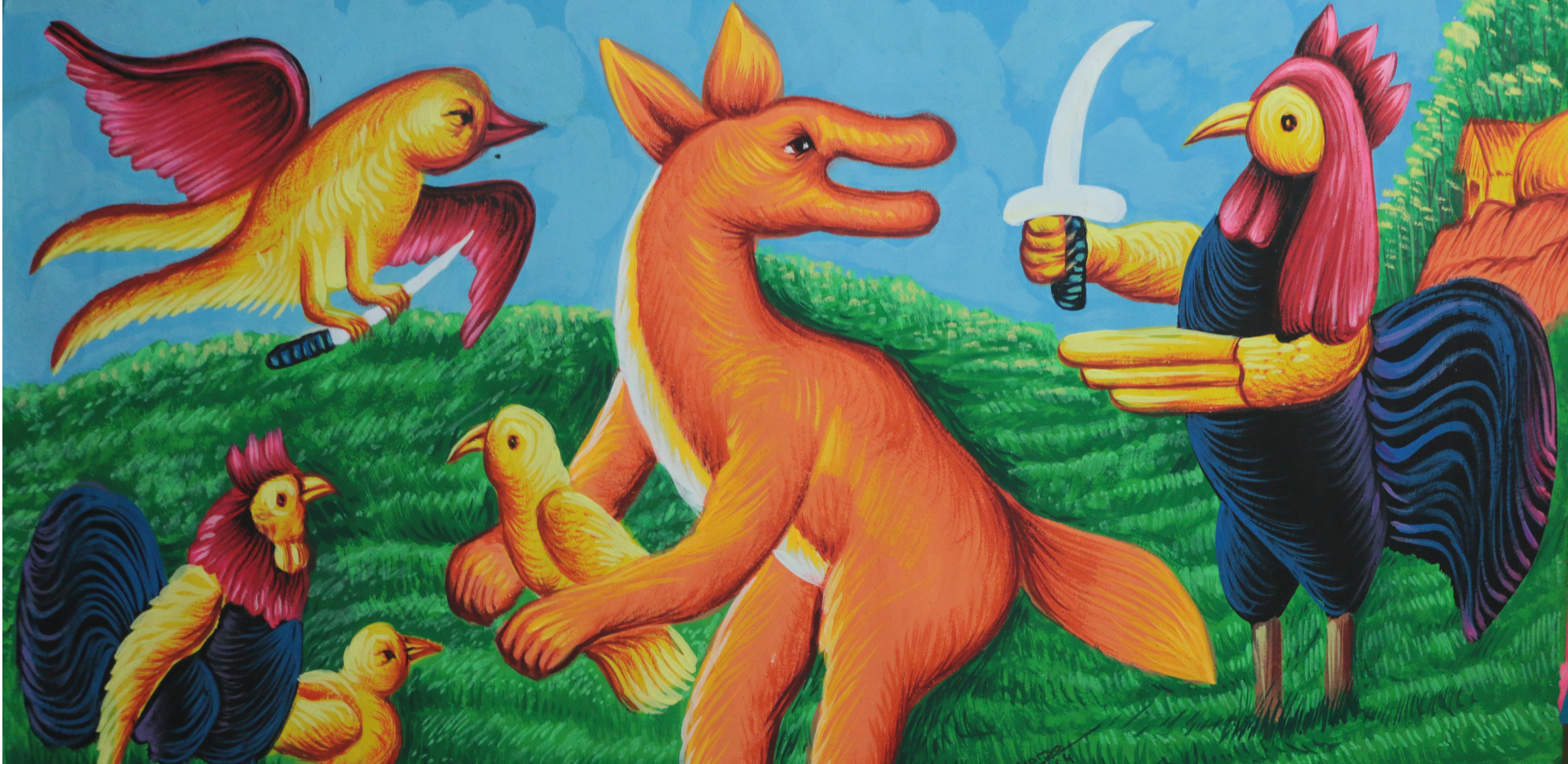
Nobo Kumar Bhadra's animal related rickshaw art

== Philosophy ==
Nobo Kumar's fundamental philosophy behind his artworks is to give people pleasure. He uses bright and vibrant colors to create characters in bizarre actions to achieve his philosophy.

== Exhibitions ==
- Summer in Colour, Zoom Galerie of Alliance Française de Dhaka
