= Abdur Razzaque (artist) =

Pakistani artist (1932–2005)

Abdur Razzaque (1932–2005) was a Bangladeshi artist. He is known as one of the significant artists of newly founded East Pakistan (now Bangladesh) in the 1950s and studied at the Art College (currently known as the Institute of Fine Art, Dhaka University) along with other pioneers from that time, including Murtaja Baseer, Rashid Chowdhury, Qayyum Chowdhury, Humayun Kabir, Zunabul Islam, Ekramul Huq, Emdad Hossain, and others. His art style is considered to be very versatile due to his usage and practice using three different mediums: sculpting, painting, and printmaking.

== Early life and education ==
Abdur Razzaque was born in Shariatpur district and spent the early years of his life in Faridpur. He passed his matriculation exam from Faridpur High School, passed his higher secondary examination in the science group from Rajendra College of Faridpur with a second division, and later in 1949 he was admitted into the Government Institute of Arts, thus shifting from Faridpur to Dhaka city. In 1954 he graduated from the Institute of Arts with a first class and served as an artist-cum-museum curator at the Malaria Research Institute of Dhaka for a year. A Fulbright Scholarship was offered to him by the State University of Iowa for post-graduate studies in fine arts. Later the same university offered him an international scholarship and research assistantship in the same field. Abdur Razzaq is known to be the first Bangladeshi who received a postgraduate degree in fine arts from abroad.

== Career ==
After completing his studies in the United States, he returned to Dhaka and joined as an appointed teacher at the Government Institute of Arts. He established a sculpture department in the East Pakistan College of Arts and Crafts (former Government Institute of Arts) in 1963 and later became the principal of this institution in 1983. He spent a big portion of his lifetime at the Institute of Fine Arts at the University of Dhaka both as a teacher and administrator. At first, he became the director in charge of the institution. After a few years he took up the position of an appointed professor, retired in 1993, but was reappointed with a 5-year arrangement under a new law added by the University of Dhaka. In 1998 he went to full retirement, but after that, he worked as a part-time teacher at the Institute of Fine Arts from 1998 to 2002.

== Major exhibitions ==
Among his eight solo shows, five shows in Bangladesh and the United States are considered to be major exhibitions. Though he participated in more than 75 public group shows, 30 shows in Bangladesh, Germany, the US, the UK, Poland, Pakistan, Turkey, Iran, Norway, Sri Lanka, India, and Brazil, including participation in the Contemporary Art of Bangladesh Shows in Malaysia and GDR, Hong Kong, Japan, Triennale India and Asian art Biennale Bangladesh are considered as his major exhibitions.

== Art style ==
Abdur Razzaque preferred mixed medium more than the others. But his mastery was equally exhibited through watercolor, etching, engraving, oil painting, etc. Even though he started out as a painter, he later focused on sculpting and was the first to turn to this medium after the War of Liberation. He used different elements like steel, wood, cement, stone, iron, bronze, etc.in the making of his sculptures. Abstract expressionism was his preferred method to communicate with the spectators of his creation. He always wanted to portray the truthful aspect of nature, only by painting them in greater form than the reality truly is, by using different vivid and vibrant colors to show exclusively the colors only but not the shapes in details.

== Awards ==
Throughout his lifetime he won many awards, and among them the significant ones are the Ekushe Padak (highest national award) for contribution in fine arts, government of Bangladesh in 1989 and 1989 : Bangladesh Charushilpi Sangshad Award. He also won an Award in Graphic Medium, was honored with the Mymensingh Sahitya Sangshad Honour for Greater Faridpur District.

== Major works ==
"Freedom Fighter" is his most renowned work in Bangladesh, located at Joydevpur cross-roads. It is a sculpture of a freedom fighter holding a grenade in one hand and a rifle in another.

== Personal life ==
Abdur Razzaque married Mustari Begum in 1961. They had two sons and one daughter (Rumana Shumi Chowdhury).
