= Abdus Shakoor (painter) =

Artist from Bangladesh (born 1947)

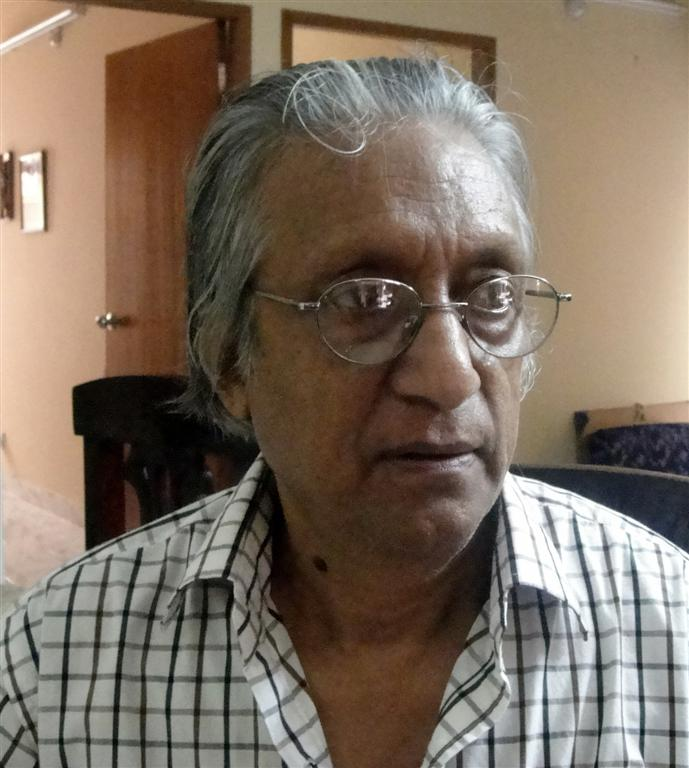
- Abdus Shakoor in 2009
- Born: 31 December 1947 (age 78); Bogra district, East Bengal, Pakistan

Abdus Shakoor (born 31 December 1947) is a Bangladeshi painter and calligrapher.

== Early life and career ==
Abdus Shakoor was born on 31 December 1947 in the Bogra district of Pakistan (now Bangladesh). His work focuses on ancestral and historical themes, following in the folk-tradition of Quamrul Hassan and Jamini Roy. Common themes in Abdus Shakoor's paintings include Bengali folk motifs and ballads; the "Mahua" and "Malua" love stories (two romantic folk ballads from Eastern Bengal, dating back to around the 17th century, collected by Dinesh Chandra Sen in the 1920s and published in his Eastern Bengal Ballads) as well as the Nakshi Kanthar Math. He has illustrated his works with folk-motifs. Peacock and parrots as well as elephants, bulls, cats, tigers, serpents and lizards feature prominently in his works.

All of Abdus Shakoor's compositions are bordered with free-flowing thick brush lines. There is almost no hard line in the paintings. His style has been compared with European artists such as Piet Mondrian and Paul Klee.

He is chairman of the Craft Department in the Faculty of Fine Arts at Dhaka University.

== Legacy ==
Among the awards Abdus Shakoor has won is a gold medal in the 15th National Art Exhibition at the Bangladesh Shilpakala Academy, Dhaka, in 2002.
