= Rashid Choudhury =

Bangladeshi artist (1932–1986)

- রশিদ হোসেন চৌধুরী
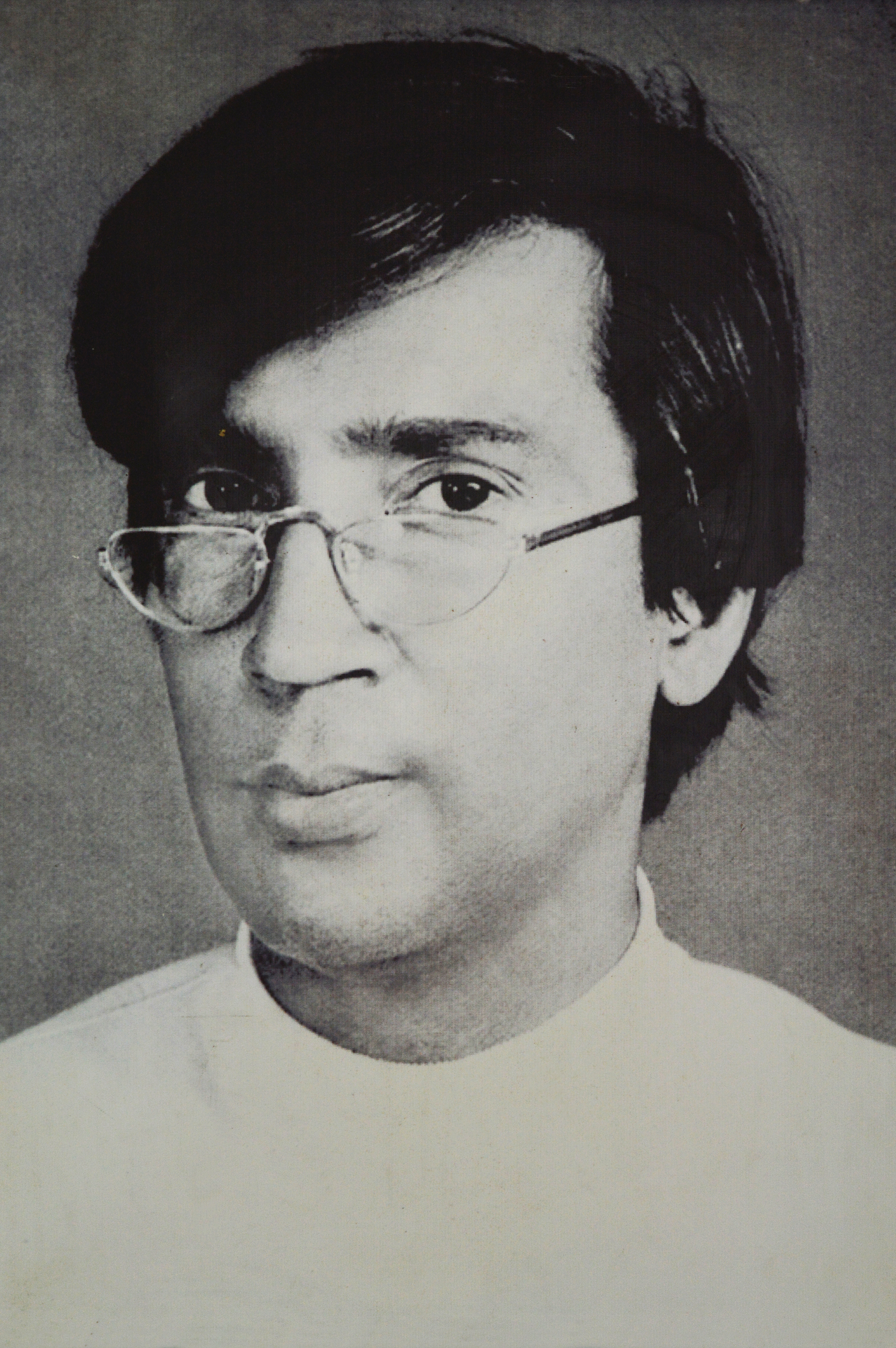
- Chowdhury's photograph
- Born: Rashid Hussain Chowdhury; 1 April 1932; Faridpur, Bengal Presidency, British India
- Died: 12 December 1986 (aged 54); Dhaka, Bangladesh
- Other name: Konok
- Citizenship: British Indian (1932–1947); Pakistani (1947–1971); Bangladeshi (1971–1986)
- Education: University of Dhaka
- Occupations: Painter; sculptor; writer; professor
- Known for: Unique contribution in Tapestry medium
- Parents: Yusuf Hossain Choudhury (father); Shirin Nessa Choudhurani (mother)
- Awards: Ekushey Padak; 1977

Rashid Hossain Choudhury (1 April 1932 – 12 December 1986) was a Bangladeshi second generation artist, sculptor, writer and professor. He played a major part in the art movements and improvement in the art-related educational institutions of Bangladesh. He has received numerous awards and recognition for creative contribution and innovative influence. During the 1950s, he had been a significant pioneer in the modern art movement in Bangladesh.

Choudhury received education in fine arts in Madrid and Paris. As such, a western influence can be seen in his uniquely Bengali work. Beside Art Movements, he made particular contribution in fine arts education in Bangladesh, founding the Chittagong Art College.

His works can be seen displayed across the world, by both public and private institutions.

== Family, early life and education ==
Choudhury was born on 1 April 1932, at Haroa, Faridpur District (now under Rajbari district). He was born to a family of zamindars, of the Ratandiya village. His father was Khan Bahadur Yusuf Hossain Choudhury and mother Shirin Nessa Choudhurani. He had nine brothers and four sisters. His uncle Khan Bahadur Alimuzzaman Choudhury was the board president of Faridpur district during that time. The Alimuzzaman Bridge, in Faridpur is named after his uncle. His father and brother were both members of parliament in Bangladesh.

His education started in a primary school of his village. Later he studied in Rajanikanto High School, Alimunzzaman High School and Park Circus School in Kolkata. He sat for his matriculation examination in 1949. He had a common friend with Zainul Abedin and Quamrul Hassan, whose suggested that he enroll in Art College, which is now known as Institute of Fine Arts, University of Dhaka. He graduated the BFA examination in 1954 with first class. After his graduation, he went to the city of Madrid in Spain in 1956 on scholarship and studied there for one year. In 1960, he went to Paris on a four-year scholarship and received higher education in Fresco, Tapestry, and Sculpture. He studied under the supervision of Artist Jean Ojam'. He went to the USA in 1975 after being awarded the Leadership Grant by the US government. In 1969, the University of Chittagong included Fine Arts in the curriculum with the support of Rashid Chowdhury. Moreover, he played an immense role in establishing Artist Rashid Choudhury Chittagong Government Fine Arts College in 1973. Following the initiative taken by Shipacharya Zainul Abedin, Rashid Chowdhury played a very commendable role in founding a formal institution to study Fine Arts in Bangladesh.

During his studies in Paris, he met and fell in love with a fellow student, Annie Grangier. They married in Paris in 1963 and had twin daughters: Shirin and Therese, named after their two grandmothers. In 1965, they traveled to Bangladesh, where Choudhury did the bulk of his most recognized artistic work.

== Legacy ==
In the Indian subcontinent, he was prominent as a tapestry artist, for which he is best known. Besides tapestry art, he also worked on oil painting, tempera, water painting and various other media. At home and abroad, he worked on many tapestry pieces for both governmental and private clients. For outstanding contribution in the tapestry industry, he was awarded the Ekushey Padak in 1977 which was then the highest civilian award in Bangladesh. He was also awarded the Bangladesh Shilpakala Academy Award in 1980.

His Tapestry has recently been on display at the Metropolitan Museum of Art New York City.

== See also ==
- List of Bangladeshi painters
