= Small World City =

Bangladeshi literary magazine

- Editor: Mehrul Bari
- Categories: Speculative fiction
- Frequency: Quarterly
- Founder: Mehrul Bari, Shehrin Hossain, Farhia Tabassum
- Founded: 2023
- First issue: August 1, 2023
- Country: Bangladesh
- Based in: Dhaka
- Language: English
- Website: smallworldcity.com

Small World City, or SWC, is an online speculative fiction magazine based in Bangladesh. It also features speculative poetry, non-fiction, art, and hybrid text in every issue. The magazine spotlights stories and poems centered around "the absurd, the otherworldly, and the mystical."

Small World City is Bangladesh's first literary magazine with a focus on the speculative genre, and among the few English-language literary magazines of the country. Beyond publishing, the magazine periodically hosts workshops and gatherings for writers in the Dhaka area.

== History ==
The magazine was founded by editor Mehrul Bari, deputy editor Shehrin Hossain, and communications director Farhia Tabassum. It was developed originally as a means to increase and improve the literary scene and alternative subcultures developing within Dhaka's creative communities. One of Small World City's key stated goals has been to prioritize and platform Bengali writers.

Small World City is a member of the Community of Literary Magazines and Presses (CLMP).

The magazine's fifth issue, marking their first anniversary, was postponed in solidarity with the 2024 quota protest movement in Bangladesh. The issue was later released on August 31st of that year.

== Reception ==
The first issue of Small World City was launched in August 2023. In his review of the issue, Aaqib Hasib of The Daily Star praised the magazine's fiction content, art, and interactive website. Bangladeshi author Shah Tazrian Ashrafi, positively reviewing the second issue, wrote, "The stories contain depths not only because they innovatively tackle these issues head on but also because of the smartness, the fluidity, and the economy of the language and the well-rehearsed character developments within a tight and foolproof narrative structure."

The magazine's website and visual interface have also been singled out by readers and critics. Writing for The Daily Star, Raian Abedin noted, "I have always been fond of the visual aesthetic that so starkly sets them apart—and with every issue, I find myself awed at the world the editors and artists have managed to create just on their website."

In 2026, Small World City was included in Fiction on the Web and Chill Sub's FISH List of Lively Indie Literary Magazines.

== Staff ==
- Mehrul Bari S. Chowdhury, editor (2023–present)
- Shehrin Hossain, deputy editor (2023–present)
- Farhia Tabassum, communications director (2023–present)
- Sajal Hossain Dhaly, first reader (2026–present)
- Zahra Mayeesha, associate editor & first reader (2024–2026)
- Asmita Mehefin, first reader (2024–2025)

== See also ==
- Bengali science fiction
- Ghosts in Bengali culture
- Fantasy fiction magazine
- Horror fiction magazine
- Bangladeshi English literature
