= Syful Islam =

Bangladeshi painter (born 1946)

- সাইফুল ইসলাম
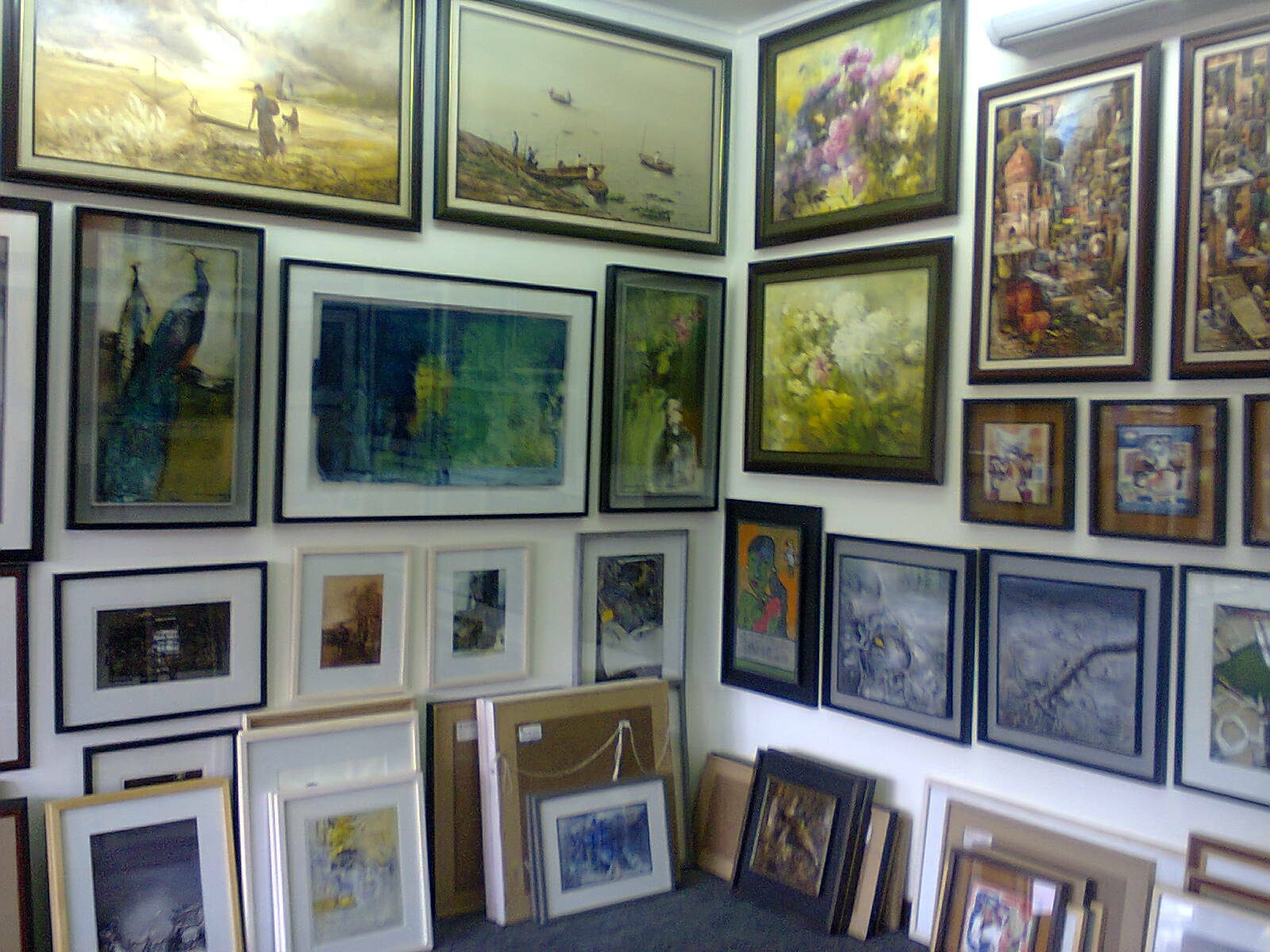
- The Cezanne Gallery view at Banani
- Born: Mohammad Syful Islam; 12 August 1946 (age 79); Meherpur, Bengal Presidency, British India
- Education: Moscow School
- Known for: Painting, printmaking, calligraphy, sculpture
- Patrons: Sheikh Mujibur Rahman

Mohammad Syful Islam (Bengali: সাইফুল ইসলাম, born 12 August 1946) is a Bangladeshi artist.

== Early life and education ==
He was born in Meherpur, Bengal Presidency, British India (now Bangladesh) to father Mohammad Naimuddin Biswas, a government official and Rahela Khatun. He had six other siblings, two brothers and four sisters. His family called him Hiller which later became Hitu. His father was an avid writer, who wrote several short novels and poetry. These writings were published in 1993 in Dhaka in the name of Kalsrot. From his childhood, Syful was very much fond of old classical Renaissance paintings, Russian and Chinese revolutionary paintings. He studied at Moscow School of Painting, Sculpture and Architecture in 1975.

== Career ==
In 1975, opposing education ministry and foreign ministry's approvals- President of Bangladesh Sheikh Mujibur Rahman sent him to Russia with a special fellowship for portrait painting training. The same year he was assassinated. Islam returned to Bangladesh the following year.

He did portraits of people such as AK Fazlul Huq, Maulana Bhashani, Rabindranath Tagore, Kazi Nazrul Islam and other famous personalities. His first commissioned work was the Kalema Tayyab in 1982.

A gold medalist in Bangladesh calligraphy, Islam is also the former teacher of Prime Minister Sheikh Hasina. Besides being commissioned for completing the portraits of all Bir Sreshtho of the country, in addition to chiefs of staffs of the National Armed Forces, Islam has completed portraits for other foreign delegates and personalities. They include that of:

- Queen Elizabeth II of the United Kingdom
- Emperor and Empress of Japan
- King and Queen of Malaysia
- Emir of Kuwait
- Josip Broz Tito
- Kurt Waldheim
- Ronald Reagan
- Indira Gandhi

== Personal life ==
He married Shahnaj Parveen in April 1975. She is from an Urdu-speaking family; her mother was from Kashmir and father was from Bombay. They have a son named Cézanne, after which his gallery is named.
