= Women artists of Bangladesh =

Overview of Bengali women artists

Bangladeshi women artists have played a significant role in the development of art in Bangladesh, despite facing various social and cultural challenges. This article provides an overview of the history and contributions of women artists in Bangladesh, from the colonial era to the modern period.

== Historical context ==
=== Traditional Role of Women in Bengali Art ===
Traditionally, women in Bengali society have been involved in various forms of folk art and craft, such as:

- Pottery
- Weaving
- Alpana (floor painting)
- Nakshikantha (embroidered quilt making)

However, women were generally not part of the formal artisan tradition or guilds in pre-modern Bengal. In terms of artists, the first female painter mentioned in Sanskrit literature is Chitralekha. She had run of the inner chambers of the Bana king of Pragjyotishpura. The painting skills of the companions of Radha find repeated mention in Vaishnava literature.

=== Colonial era ===
The arrival of the British in Bengal created new opportunities for women to engage in fine arts. During the 19th century, as art became separated from hereditary family workshops, women from upper-class families began to enter the arena of fine arts alongside men.

Unlike traditional artisan castes, such as chitrakar (painter) or malakar (garland maker), the profession of artist coincided with the colonization of the British. It appeared to be the result of the exhibitions, art organizations, art educational institutions and the writings on art.

==== Women in the Fine Art Exhibition ====
Twenty-five women, most of them Bengali, participated in the 1879 Calcutta Fine Art Exhibition. In 1939 women were provided the opportunity to enroll as students in the Calcutta Government Art School and they took it with pleasure. Aparna Ray was a student of the first batch of women and went on to become a teacher at the same school. Yet we meet with women prior to the professional entrance of women in the field of art who had worked with the materials and technique of professional artists and also expressed their individual qualities in their work. Needless to say not be said that they practiced art alongside their family activities. Perhaps that is why there is distinctiveness in their work. Moreover, the women's art that was practiced so far was created fora different world and had different objectives. Thus, the art of these women artists shows the desire to find their own space within these contradictions. It must be remembered that the entrance into this new field was for women almost like an act of trespassing because it created an opportunity to encounter the public world outside the premises of the household.

=== Modern era ===
We know the names of a few women artists. Yet in most cases we hardly see works of art to go with the artists. The reason is that women have created art as a hobby along with their other family responsibilities. They were in most cases not solely devoted to art. Thus, the number of work they produced was comparatively much less than that of males. It is therefore difficult to forma clear view of their work. We may hear about their work but there is very little scope of viewing their work. That is why the work of women artists is mostly unknown, unrecognized, unanalyzed and unevaluated. When woman proves her extraordinary qualities, her personality overwhelms her work and becomes more important. Her work becomes only a facet of her personality. All of this has to be considered when the works of women artists are evaluated, or else the work of half the population of Bengal, and the world will be neglected. Most women artists come from educated upper or middle-class families.

After the partition of India in 1947, what is the present Institute of Fine Art under the University of Dhaka was founded as the 'Government Institute of Arts' in 1948. The first five women admitted to this institution in the 1954–55 session were Tahera Khanam, Rowshan Ara, Hasina Ali, Jubaida Akter Khatun and Syeda Moyeena Ahsan. Except Moyeena Ahsan all the others completed their five-year course. All these women came from urban and enlightened families except for Jubaida Akter. It is known that there was never any opposition from their families for setting off in the world of art. Tahera Khanam later married the famous artist Qayyum Chowdhury and continues to paint (fig. 1.15). It must be admitted that these women must have been very courageous and self-confident to disregard the curious gaze of society and take up the study of such an unusual subject. It is also true that later on women who did study at art institutions did not apply their training to visibly creative activity. Many did not complete their academic studies. It does not seem easy to combine the social and familial responsibilities of women with mainstream art practice. Thus only the women who have dispensed with social and family life and only as long as they have done so have they been able to contribute to mainstream art. In this respect Novera Ahmed is an exceptional personality of this country. She returned to the country after finishing her diploma in sculpture from England in 1956. She practiced sculpture which was not only not in circulation; it could also cause religious controversy. Sculpture came a long way with her sincerity and dedication. She researched into the uncommon material of cement and iron rod. Moreover, she conducted many experiments with folk subject and form (fig. 1.14). The first sculpture exhibition, the first outdoor sculpture and creating the first relief mural on a public edifice in Dhaka all goes to her credit. She was also involved in creating the national Shaheed Minar, monument to the martyrs of the Language Movement. She caused these revolutionary incidents to happen in Dhaka between 1956 and 1960 and possibly left for West Pakistan due to the lack of patronage. However, the combination of the folk trend with internationalism and her clear concept of the contemporary western art world gave her the boldness to step on the threshold of many new doors. Perhaps because she grew up in a truly international and enlightened environment, her identity and her patriotic ideas were not burdened by the shackles of inferiority. Moreover, as a woman she did not have the pressure to achieve social recognition and professional success. This is perhaps why she could so spontaneously continue in her experiments. She is the first modern sculptor of Bangladesh. The teachers and administration of the government art institute was still very wary of introducing sculpture in the curriculum in fear that people would begin to think that they were encouraging un-Islamic practices in a Muslim country. The first woman to have a solo painting exhibition in Dhaka was Durre Khanam. She was better known as Rumi Islam because of her marriage to the artist, Aminul Islam. Later they were divorced. Her exhibition was held in 1960 two years after completing her education at the Institute of Fine Art. This exhibition featured works in the medium of oil and tempera and the paintings showed a clear bend towards abstraction (fig. 1.16). The exhibition was highly acclaimed by Zainul Abedin, A.L. Khatib and Sadeq Khan. Her work showed great promise but she later completely disappeared from the art world of Bangladesh. We notice in both the cases of Novera Ahmed and Rumi Islam that they entered the world of male-centric art even though they were women. Great talent, firmness and dedication must have followed them in their footsteps. Yet as they went considerably against social mores to enter this male controlled realm, they could not last there for very long. Similarly, the new horizons that they pointed to and their historical importance were not to be evaluated by patriarchal society.

== Notable artists ==
=== Pre-Partition Era (Before 1947) ===
==== Girmdramohini Dasi (1858–1924) ====
Girindramohini Dasi was born in Kolkata. Her father was Haranchandra Mitra. She wrote poetry and painted. She was accomplished in painting divinities and landscapes. Lady Minto, wife of the Viceroy saw one of her paintings and sent it to Australia to a painting exhibition. Her paintings were reproduced in her own books of poetry and in Bharati, Manashiand Marmabani journals.

==== Sucharu Devi (1874–1959) ====
Her Highness Maharani Sucharu Devi (or Suchara Devi) (9 October 1874 – 14 December 1959) was the Maharani of Mayurbhanj State, India. (Full article...)

She learnt oil painting from a European woman teacher called Short. After her marriage to Maharaja Sriramchandra Bhanj Deo she became more enthusiastic about art and gained experience about western art in Europe. She was adept at painting landscapes in oil. In a collection of paintings called Bhakti-Arghashe (fig. 1.10) Painting by illustrated her father's childhood. She Sunayani Devi expressed the grief of the death of her husband and son and the pain of her own lonely life in her paintings...

==== Sunayani Devi (1875–1962) ====
Sunayani Devi (18 June 1875 – 23 February 1962) was an Indian painter born into the aristocratic Tagore family in Calcutta, West Bengal. She was a self taught artist, with no academic training in art. Inspired by her brothers, Abanindranath Tagore, Gaganendranath Tagore, and Samarendranath Tagore, she started painting only at the age of 30. She was married at the age of 12 to the grandson of Raja Ram Mohan Roy. (Full article...)

The Indian Society of Oriental Art organized a number of exhibitions of her paintings in Europe but she had no shows at home during her lifetime.

==== Meherbanu Khanam (1885–1925) ====
Meherbanu Khanam (Bengali: মেহেরবানু খানম; 1885 – 3 October 1925) was an artist and noblewoman in Bengal of Kashmiri ancestry. She was the daughter of Nawab Sir Khwaja Ahsanullah Bahadur and his wife Nawab Begum Kamrunnesa. (Full article...)

==== Shukhalata Rao (1886–1969) ====
Shukhalata Rao (1886–1969) was an Indian social worker, artist and children's book author. Born in Calcutta in the Bengal province of British India, she was the daughter of Upendrakishore Ray Chowdhury, and sister of Sukumar Ray. She studied in Bethune College, and obtained a bachelor's degree. (Full article...)

==== Hasina Khanam (1892-?) ====
Hasina Khanam has been mentioned as the first Muslim woman artist in the Charitabhidhan published by Bangla Academy. Some watercolors and sketches done by her were published in Sawgat, Basumati journals.

==== Pratima Devi (1893–1969) ====
Pratima Devi (5 November 1893 – 9 January 1969) was an Indian Bengali artist, widely known for her artistic abilities. She was the wife of Rathindranath Tagore. The poet took special interest in developing her capabilities. (Full article...)

==== Shanta Devi (1893–1984) ====
Shanta Devi was born in Kolkata. Her father was Ramananda Chatterjee editor of the journals Prabasi, Modern Review and Bishal Bharat and her mother was Monorama Devi. She began to write and paintfrom her childhood due to the family environment. She learnt painting under Abanindranath and Nandalal Bose. Later on in Santiniketan she studied painting supervised by Nandalal. There she also studied the technique of oil painting under Andre Karpelles. Shanta Devi painted in the Indian style but the subject she selected reflected her originality (fig. 1.12). She played the esraj, wrote and stitched kantha(quilted embroidery). Her paintings were exhibited and won awards in Kolkata, Madras and Yangon. She was nearly ninety years old when her paintings and other art pieces were exhibited at the Birla Academy.

==== Shukumari Devi (died 1938) ====
Shukumari Devi's father was the zamindar of Borodia of Chanpur-Comilla, Ramkumar Majumdar and her mother was Anandamoyi Devi. Shukumari was widowed at the age of fourteen and three years later she went to Santiniketan at the encouragement of Kalimohan Ghose of Sriniketan. Because of her skill in needlework and alpana Rabindranath directed Nandalal to employ Shukumari as the teacher of needle art in Kala Bhavana. Additionally, she also learnt to paint from Nandalal. Episodes from the Puranas, gods and goddesses were the prime subject of her paintings. Kamal Sarkar notes that her paintings executed in bright colors and bold lines are slightly decorative. She was also highly skilled in alpana and other crafts.

==== Prakriti Chattapadhyay (1895–1934) ====
Prakriti Chattapadhyay was the daughter of the artist Jaladhichandra (fig. 1.12) Shanta Mukhapadhyay who was the grandson of Jatindramohan Tagore. She painted scenes Devi, Child with a Doll from Krishnalila, Bhuddha's life and the poetry and stories of Rabindranath Tagore in watercolors. She was skilled in gesso painting, painting on silk, lacquer work and enameling. Her embroidery and alpana were featured in publications.

==== Indurani Sinha (1905-?) ====
Indurani Sinha was born in Kolkata. Her father was Akshay Kumar Mitraandmother Rajlakshmi Devi. She was married to the artist Satishchandra Sinha in 1920 and nearly sixteen years after that she began to practice art supervised by her husband. She worked in oils, watercolor and pastels. She was adept in painting landscapes, village people, and nude and draped figures. In 1941 she established a school of art for women.

==== Gouri Bhanja (1907–1998) ====
Gouri Bhanja (1907–1998) was an Indian artist best known for contributing to the original illuminated Constitution of India and for dedicating several decades of her life to teaching at Kala Bhavana. She was the eldest daughter of Nandalal Bose, master of Indian art. (Full article...)

==== Indiradevi Roy Chowdhury (1910–1950) ====
Indiradevi Roy Chowdhury was the daughter of Srishachandra Bhattacharya and Binodini Devi of Gopalpur, Tangail. She was married to the musician Kumar Birendra Kishore Roy Chowdhury of Gouripur, Mymensingh. She learnt painting from Kshitindranath Majumdar after her marriage and learnt portrait painting from Atul Bose. Her paintings, done in oil and watercolors, have been exhibited in many shows. She received the best prize among women in the category of painting in the Indian style at the eleventh yearly exhibition of the Academy of Fine Arts, Calcutta.

==== Indusudha Ghose ====
Indusudha Ghose's first lessons in painting were from a photographer in Mymensingh. She went to Santiniketan in 1926 and practiced the arts and crafts during the principalship of Nandalal Bose. She was successful in painting, decoration and needlework. She was the only female member of the organization 'Karushangha' founded by the artists of Santiniketan. She joined Sriniketan as a teacher after completing her studies in Kala Bhavana. From 1931 to 1932 she taught art at the Nivedita Girls School of Kolkata as instructed by Nandalal Bose. She was also associated with revolutionary activities and was in prison for five years. In later life she worked with Mahila Shilpa Shikshalay and Nari Sheba Shangha to develop self-reliance among impoverished women.

==== Hashirashi Devi ====
Hashirashi Devi was born in Gobardanga of Twenty Four Parganas. Her father was a lawyer from Dinajpur. She was interested in art from her childhood and became introduced to Abanindranath. The grief of the death of her only daughter found expression in many of her paintings. Her paintings were published in journals such as Bharatbarsha, Masik Basumati, Bichitra, Jayasri, Prabartak. She became well known for her humorous stories and their caricaturist illustrations.

==== Jamuna Sen (1912–2001) ====
Jamuna Sen (née Bose) (Bengali: যমুনা সেন) (7 October 1912 – 10 February 2001) was an Indian artist, known for her design work in a variety of mediums including Batik and Alpona as well as developing, in an Indian context, a variety of traditional crafts from across the world. She was a pioneer in establishing the practice of Batik (wax resist dying) in India in modern times. Daughter of Nandalal Bose, a central figure in modern Indian art, she was brought up in the artistic and intellectual milieu of Santiniketan and made significant contributions in the field of design. (Full article...)

==== Rani Chanda (1912–1997) ====
Rani Chanda, sister of Mukulchandra Dey, was born in Midnapore. She came to Kala Bhavana in 1928 and studied painting and had the fortune of being supervised by Nandalal Bose and Abanindranath Tagore. She worked in the media of watercolor, tempera, crayon, chalk, woodcut and linocut. She was incarcerated for her involvement in the 'Quit India' movement.

==== Chitranibha Chowdhury ====
Chitranibha Chowdhury (27 November 1913 – 9 November 1999) was a twentieth-century Indian artist, a member of the Bengal School of Art, and one of the first female painters in Bengal. She created over a thousand artworks, including landscapes, still lifes, decorative art, murals, and portraits. She was a Nandalal Bose student and the first female painting teacher in Kala Bhavana, Shantiniketan. Her real name Nibhanani Bose was changed to Chitranibha Bose by Rabindranath Tagore. (Full article...)

==== Kamini Sundari Paul ====
Kamini Sundari Paul was wife of Shashibhushan Paul, founder of the Maheshwarpasha School of Art in 1940. She joined the school as a teacher ofneedlework. She won recognition for her embroidered paintings. She had no institutional training. She was born in Khalishpur, Khulna in 1883. Her father was called Raichan Das. The subject of her paintings were portraits of famous personalities and historical incidents like the Battle of Plassey.

=== Post-Partition Era (After 1947) ===
==== Farida Zaman (born 1953) ====
Farida Zaman (born 1953) is a Bangladeshi artist and illustrator. She is the chairman and professor of the department of Drawing and Painting at the Faculty of Fine Arts, University of Dhaka. In recognition of her contribution in art, the government of Bangladesh awarded her the country's second highest civilian award Ekushey Padak in 2020. (Full article...)

==== Rokeya Sultana (born 1958) ====
Rokeya Sultana showed increased activity from the nineties. Her work became distinguished by the depiction of her self-realization and her lived experience. She represented her daily struggle in the known surroundings of her city. Her images are similar to child art. Syed Manzoorul Islam specifies, 'Her works . . . draw strength from primitive sensibility or from a child's unrestricted vision. She works in prints and other media. Rhythmic lines and figurative imagery lends distinction to her work. Woman's existence, experience and the sensory world from a woman's perception are the materials that make up her work.

==== Akhtar Jahan (born 1958) ====
Akhtar Jahan is one among a few women sculptors. She grows more productive from the nineties. Childhood memories, the environment and nature have found a place in her work. She works in cement, bronze, sheet metal, wood, terracotta etc. media. A simple abstraction of elements and figures from her known world distinguished her work.

==== Dilara Begum Jolly (born 1960) ====
Dilara Begum Jolly is a Bangladeshi print artist, sculptor, installation artist, and painter. She is known for her work highlighting discrimination against women and explicitly presenting feminist perspectives in her work. (Full article...)

==== Fareha Zeba (born 1961) ====
Fareha Zeba in her show entitled Homage to Frida Kahlo of 1998 sought her history as a woman artist through the work of the Mexican artist, Frida Kahlo. The pain of Frida's tragic life seems to stretch across the barriers of time and space and speaks for Zeba. The notable aspect of this exhibition was a woman's tribute, empathy andcompassion foranother woman. Zeba's work also portrays the oppression anddiscrimination against women and women who have successfully surmounted these obstacles. Her form is figurative and her use of medium expresses dynamic swiftness. She expresses the power and strength of women in her depictions of women who have left their mark on time (fig. 1.27).

==== Ferdousi Priyabhashini (born 1947) ====
Ferdousi Priyabhashini (19 February 1947 – 6 March 2018) was a Bangladeshi sculptor. She was the first one to publicly announce herself as Birangona, a term coined by Sheikh Mujibur Rahman for the rape victims of the Liberation War of Bangladesh in 1971. Government of Bangladesh awarded her Independence Day Award in 2010. (Full article...)

==== Atia Islam Anne (born 1962) ====
Atia Islam Anne (1962 – 2 July 2026) was a Bangladeshi artist known for her work on women's regrets, needs, despair and frustration and, more broadly, violence against women. Along with artists like Dilara Begum Jolly, Kanak Chanpa Chakma, and Fareha Zeba, Anne is part of a movement of women artists whose feminist work became more popular during the 1990s in Bangladesh. (Full article...)

==== Niloofar Chaman (born 1962) ====
Niloofar Chaman is a Bangladeshi artist based in Chittagong, Bangladesh, whose work focuses on themes of social injustice and discrimination against women. (Full article...)

==== Kanak Chanpa Chakma (born 1963) ====
Kanak Chanpa Chakma (born 6 May 1963) is a Bangladeshi Chakma artist. She is known for her paintings depicting the lives of Bangladeshi ethnic minorities, focusing on the lives of women, and their daily lives combining semi-realistic and abstract in the same frame. (Full article...)

==== Nasima Haque Mitu (born 1967) ====
Nasima Haque Mitu has selected the carving technique in sculpture. Her work uses very simple and pure yet meaningful and symbolic forms (fig. 1.30). It is as if the intent is to seek inner meaning, not to explain. Her work expresses the dichotomy and the relationship between the male and the female in a subtle way.
