= The Tiger, the Brahmin and the Jackal =

Indian fairy tale

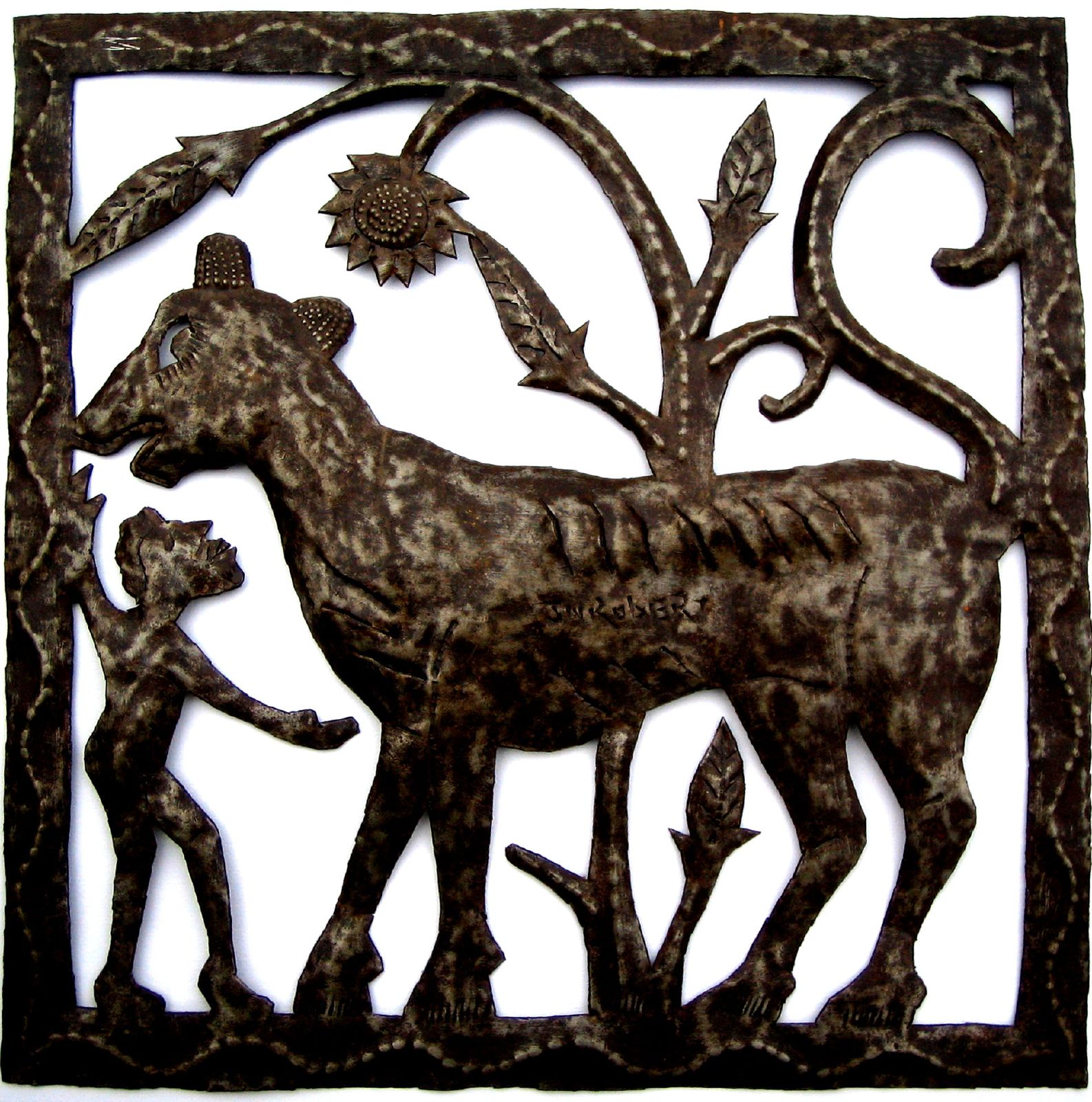
An illustration of a variant of the tale

The Tiger, the Brahmin and the Jackal is a popular Indian folklore with a long history and many variants. The earliest record of the folklore was included in the Panchatantra, which dates the story between 200 BCE and 300 CE.

Mary Frere included a version in her 1868 collection of Indian folktales, Old Deccan Days, the first collection of Indian folktales in English. A version was also included in Joseph Jacobs' collection Indian Fairy Tales.

== Plot ==
A Brahmin (a member of the priest class in the caste system in India) passes a tiger who is stuck in a trap. The tiger pleads for his release, promising not to eat the Brahmin. The Brahmin sets him free but the tiger immediately says that he is going to eat the Brahmin. The Brahmin is horrified and tells the tiger how unjust he is for not keeping his word. They agree to ask the first three things they encounter to judge between them. The first thing they encounter is a tree, who, having suffered at the hands of humans, answers that the tiger should eat the Brahmin. Next a buffalo, exploited and mistreated by humans, agrees it is only just that the Brahmin should be eaten. Finally they meet a jackal who, sympathetic to the Brahmin's plight, at first feigns incomprehension of what has happened and asks to see the trap. Once there he claims he still doesn't understand. The tiger gets back in the trap to demonstrate and the jackal quickly shuts him in, suggesting to the Brahmin that they leave matters thus.

== Variants ==
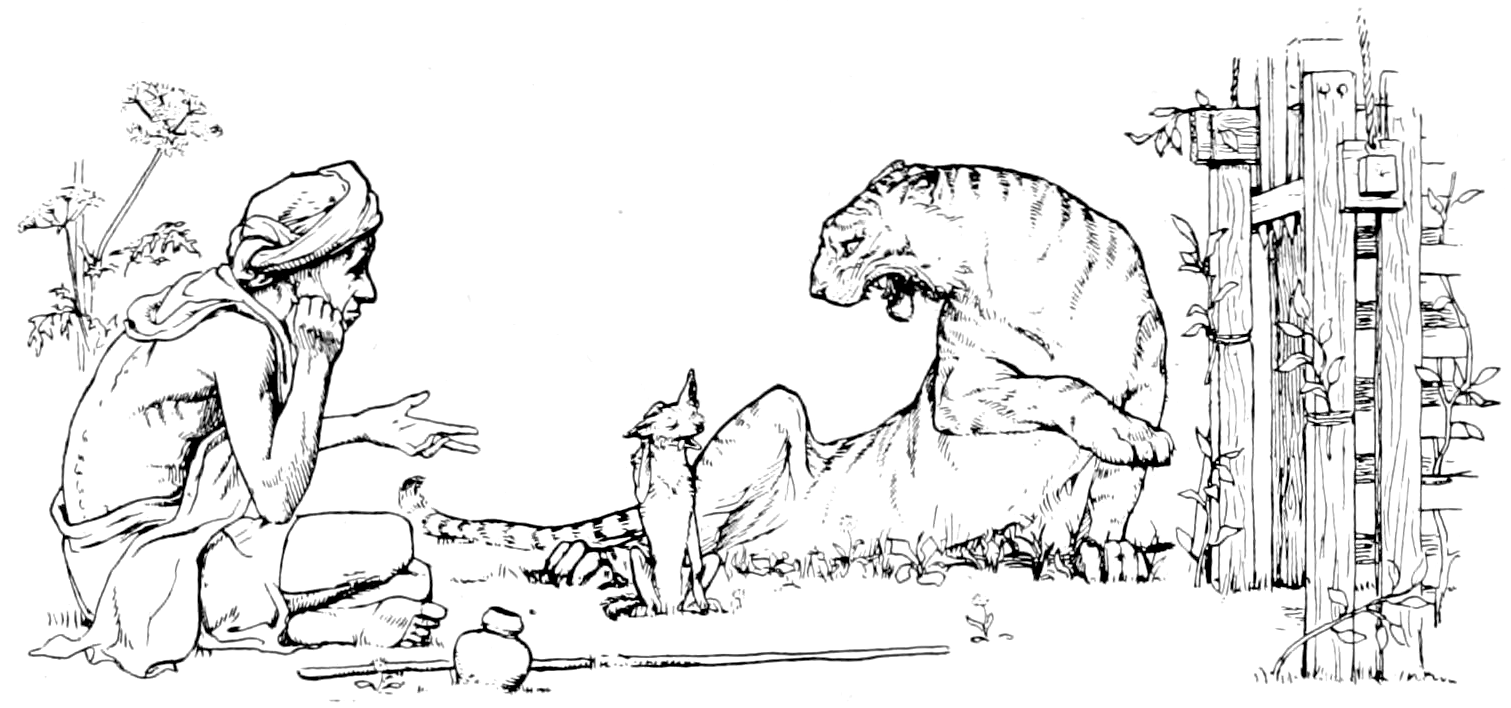
an illustration by John D. Batten for 1912 book by Joseph Jacobs.

There are more than a hundred versions of this tale spread across the world. In some the released animal is a crocodile, in some a snake, a tiger and in others a wolf.

Folklorist Joseph Jacobs stated that the tale can be found in early Indian sources. Some variants are very old, going back at least to the Panchatantra or Fables of Bidpai and the Jataka tales. In Europe, it appeared some 900 years ago in the Disciplina Clericalis of Petrus Alphonsi, and later in the Gesta Romanorum and in the Directorium Vitae Humanae of John of Capua.

Upendrakishore Ray Chowdhury, the famous Bengali children's writer, wrote a comic version of the story in his Tuntunir Boi (The Tailorbird's Book), called "Dushto Bagh" ("The Wicked Tiger").

There are also modern illustrated versions of the tale, such as The Tiger, the Brahmin & the Jackal illustrated by David Kennett and The Tiger and the Brahmin illustrated by Kurt Vargo. Rabbit Ears Productions produced a video version of the last book, narrated by Ben Kingsley, with music by Ravi Shankar. The variant by Rabbit Ears Productions alters certain bits of the story, where the Brahmin travels alone to gain the opinion of others. An elephant is included as first of the three things (the latter two being the tree and water buffalo) that the Brahmin encounters.

A Shona version of this folktale was adapted in a popular Zimbabwean folksong Mutongi Gava Maenzanise. The variation is that its a leopard not a tiger and the next creature they see is a cow.

== See also ==
- The Wolf of Zhongshan
