= Atia Islam Anne =

Bangladeshi painter (1962–2026)

- আতিয়া ইসলাম এ্যানি
- Portrait of Anne
- Born: 1962; Dhaka, East Pakistan, Pakistan
- Died: 2 July 2026 (aged 64); Dhanmondi, Dhaka, Bangladesh
- Occupation: Artist

Atia Islam Anne (1962 – 2 July 2026) was a Bangladeshi artist known for her work on women's regrets, needs, despair and frustration and, more broadly, violence against women. Along with artists like Dilara Begum Jolly, Kanak Chanpa Chakma, and Fareha Zeba, Anne is part of a movement of women artists whose feminist work became more popular during the 1990s in Bangladesh.

== Education ==
In 1982 Anne received a BFA in Drawing and Painting from Institute of Fine Arts, University of Dhaka, Bangladesh, and in 1985 received an MFA in Drawing and Painting at the same university.

== Major themes ==
Atia Islam Anne's work has been cited as "testament to a newly awakening consciousness among the female artists of Bangladesh", particularly her "Women and Society" series as a satire on the dominant, male myth and simultaneously an attack on the patriarchal system, in which women are viewed solely as sex objects.

Atia Islam Anne's works are surrealistic and have a touch of fantasy, tinged with irony and humour. Her work highlights the tragic conditions brought on by misrule and abuse of power, with a clear message of social criticism running throughout.

== Death ==
Anne died from cancer in Dhanmondi, Dhaka, on 2 July 2026, at the age of 64.

== Selected exhibitions ==
Between 1981 and 2009, Anne's work was included in over 60 group shows in China, USA, India, UK, France, Myanmar and Bangladesh.

In 2009, she held a solo exhibition entitled Inauspicious Time, at the Bengal Gallery of Fine Arts, described as " a satire on the dominant male myth and an attack on the hollowness of the patriarchal system where women are always sex objects."

== See also ==
- Women Artists of Bangladesh
