= Rumana =

Rumana or Roumana may refer to:

- Rumana, Israel
- Rumana, West Bank
- Rumana Monzur, Bangladeshi woman studying in Canada who was blinded by her husband in an attempt to stop her education

== See also ==
- Ruman (disambiguation)
- Rumman (disambiguation)
