= Ruman =

Ruman may refer to:

- Ruman (surname)
- Ruman Ahmed, Bangladeshi cricketer
- Operation RUMAN

== See also ==
- Rumman (disambiguation)
- Rumana (disambiguation)
- Tell Ruman, a village in Syria
