= Punyalata Chakraborty =

Bengali writer (1890–1974)

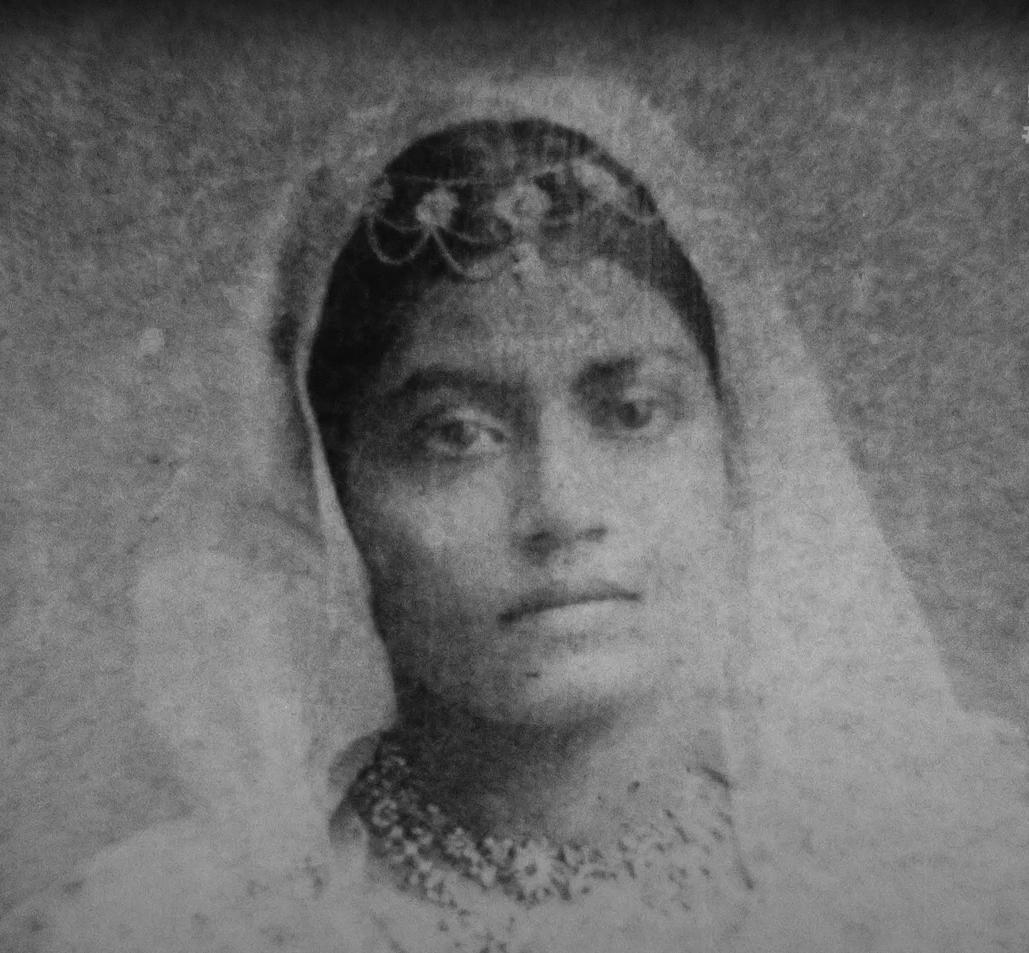
- Born: 10 September 1890; Calcutta, Bengal Presidency, British India
- Died: 21 November 1974 (aged 84); Calcutta, West Bengal, India
- Occupation: Children's Literature Writer
- Notable work: Chotobelar Dinguli, Choto Choto Golpo
- Parent(s): Upendrakishore Ray Chowdhury (Father), Bidhumukhi Devi (Mother)
- Relatives: Sukumar Ray(Elder Brother), Subinay Ray (Younger Brother), Shukhalata Rao (Sister)

Punyalata Chakraborty (10 September 1890 – 21 November 1974) was a Bengali children's literature writer. Her works includes Chhotobelar Dinguli, Chhoto Chhoto Golpo, Gachhpalar Katha and others.

Punyalata Chakraborty's ancestral home was in Mosua of present-day Kishoreganj, Bangladesh. Her father was the famous children's author, musician, painter and technologist Upendrakishore Ray Chowdhury. Her mother, Bidhumukhi Devi, was the daughter of the social reformer Dwarkanath Ganguly of the Brahmo Samaj. Her elder brother (eldest sibling) was the renowned children's author and pioneer of nonsense literature in Bengali, Sukumar Ray. She had two younger brothers, Subinoy Ray and Subimal Ray, and two sisters, Sukhalata Rao and Shantilata. In 1909, while studying for her bachelor's degree, she married Deputy Magistrate Arunnath Chakraborty. She had two daughters, both of whom were accomplished. Her elder daughter, Kalyani Karlekar, was a notable social worker, professor of English literature and author. Her younger daughter, Nalini Das (writer), was a distinguished educator, professor, principal and children's literature writer. The famous social reformer Dwarkanath Ganguly was her maternal grandfather.

== Works ==
Punyalata Chakraborty wrote many stories, novels and translated works. Her books include:

- Chhotobelar Dinguli (Childhood Days)
- Chhoto Chhoto Golpo (Short Stories)
- Sadib Magic
- Gachhpalar Katha (Tales of Plants)
- Rajbari (The Palace, a novel)
