= Dilara Begum Jolly =

Bangladeshi painter and artist

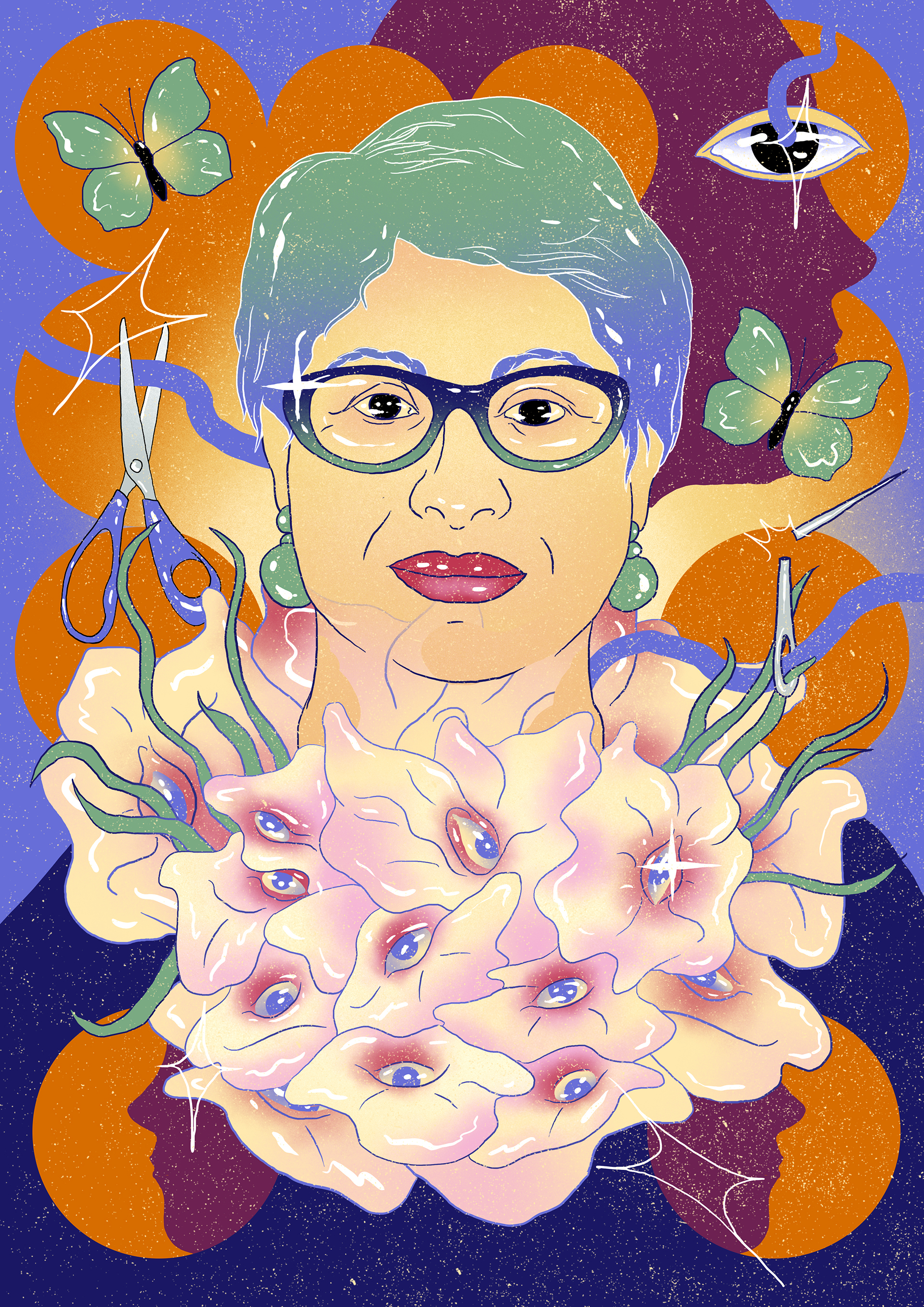
Portrait of Dilara Begum Jolly

Dilara Begum Jolly is a Bangladeshi print artist, sculptor, installation artist, and painter. She is known for her work highlighting discrimination against women and explicitly presenting feminist perspectives in her work.

== Biography ==
=== Personal life ===
Dilara Begum is known more by her nickname Jolly than her official name.

She studied painting and printmaking at Government Arts College, Chittagong (BFA 1981); then gained her Master of Fine Arts, Painting at the Institute of Fine Arts, University of Dhaka, in 1984. In 1991, she gained a Post Diploma in Print Making in Santiniketan, West Bengal, with a scholarship from the Indian Government.

Jolly said in an interview that her mother was the first inspiration for her to overcome social barriers, and that her mother used to say "women should become educated, and to achieve a voice of their own they need to be economically self-sufficient"

In 2011, Jolly and her husband were involved in a bus accident which killed internationally acclaimed filmmaker Tareque Masud, ATN News CEO Mishuk Munier, and three others. The group were traveling in a micro-bus traveling to Manikganj town to meet the deputy commissioner to seek permission for shooting Tareque's latest film, Kagojer Phool, after visiting a shooting spot in Shibalaya Upazila, when a passenger bus collided head on with their micro-bus on the Dhaka-Aricha Highway at Ghior in Manikganj. Jolly suffered a fractured hand.

== Career ==
Jolly began her career as a printmaker. In 2014, she held an exhibition entitled "Threads of Testimony" at the Bengel Art Lounge in Dhaka looking at the condition of women in the garment industry in Bangladesh.

=== Major themes ===
Dilara Begum Jolly's works highlight the inner journey as well as harsh realities of the women's life. Different strong women characters such as Jamila of Syed Wali Ullah's novel 'Lalsalu' have influenced her. Her series work Embryo Withdrawn presents an urge of a mother to hide her teenage daughter, who is a victim of society's patriarchy, into her ovary. 'It is a true story of one of my relatives. After expressing that utmost and unreal solution to keep her daughter in peace the mother died immediately. The memory still haunts me,' said Jolly.

Jolly has focused on a number of social issues in both specific to Bangladesh, and globally: beginning with Lalshalu in 1985, in 1996 she portrayed the tragedy of Nurjahan, a victim of ‘Fatwa’ who killed herself after she was pronounced guilty of adultery by the village council and publicly stoned, and including work on the tragic story of Rumana Manzur, teacher of the Dhaka University, blinded by her husband in 2011 because she wanted to continue her studies abroad against his wishes, and the young female garment workers of Tazreen Fashion who were burnt alive in a factory fire in 2012.

In her paintings, Jolly focuses on the reality of the situation of women in a male-dominated society; her way of protesting against this system has more to do with satire, ridicule and incisive irony than direct statement.

The changed perspective of world politics after 9/11, the violence of the unfair Iraq War and the realization that mothers were the main victims of the war led to Jolly's work on the female reproductive system and on the topic of motherhood; the senselessness of bringing new life into a world made unfit for living and women's lack of choice in the matter prompted her to work on the embryo.

== Awards ==
- 1980 : All Media Best Award, Govt. Art College, Chittagong
- 1980 : Best Award Expo; organized by L' Alliance Francaise de Chittagong, Chittagong
- 1981 : Zainul Abedeen Award, Govt. Art College, Chittagong
- 1996 : Honorable Mention 12th National Art Exhibition, Bangladesh Shilpakala Academy, Dhaka
- 2002 : Bengal Foundation Award, 15th National Art Exhibition, Bangladesh Shilpakala Academy, Dhaka

== Selected exhibitions ==
Her work features in the Bangladesh National Museum, Dhaka, Bangladesh; Bangladesh Shilpakala Academy National Art Gallery, Dhaka, Bangladesh and many other private collections in Bangladesh and abroad.

=== Selected solo exhibitions ===
- 1984: German Cultural Centre, Dhaka.
- 1992: L'Alliance Francaise de Chittagong.
- 1994: Jojan Art Gallery, Dhaka.
- 2001: Gallery 21, Dhaka.
- 2006: Bengal gallery of Fine Arts, Dhaka.
- 2008: Alliance Francaise of Chittagong, Bangladesh.

== Notes/Further reading ==
Dilara Begum Jolly's blog

== See also ==
- Women Artists of Bangladesh
