= The Wolf of Zhongshan =

Chinese tale

"The Wolf of Zhongshan" (Chinese: 中山狼傳; pinyin: Zhōngshān Láng Zhuàn) is a popular Chinese tale that deals with the ingratitude of a creature after being saved. The first print of the story is found in the Ming-dynasty Ocean Stories of Past and Present (Chinese: 古今說海; pinyin: Gǔjīn Shuōhǎi) published in 1544. The story is commonly attributed to Ma Zhongxi (1446–1512).

== Synopsis ==
The story is set during the late Spring and Autumn period. King Jian Zi (趙簡子 - BC?-BC 476) was leading a hunting party through Zhongshan when he came across a wolf. King Jian takes aim with his bow and arrow but misses and hits a stone instead. The wolf desperately flees through the forest with the hunting party in pursuit. As the wolf makes its way through the forest he stumbles upon a traveling Mohist scholar Mr. Dongguo who is a kind young man (Chinese: 東郭先生; pinyin: Dōngguō Xiānshēng). The wolf appeals to the scholar's belief of "universal love" and implores for his help. Mr. Dongguo takes pity on the creature and hides it in one of his book bags strapped to his donkey.

When the hunters approach him, Mr. Dongguo denies any knowledge of the wolf's whereabouts. After the hunters have left, Mr. Dongguo lets the wolf out of his bag, gets on his donkey, and prepares to take his leave only to be stopped by the wolf. The wolf now asks the scholar to save his life again, this time from starvation. Mr. Dongguo offers the wolf some pastries, but the wolf smiles and said "I don't eat those, I dine solely on meat". Puzzled, Mr. Dongguo inquires if the wolf intends to eat his donkey and the wolf replies "No, no, donkey meat is no good". The donkey, upon hearing this, bolts from the scene as fast as its four legs to carry it leaving Mr. Dongguo behind with the wolf. To Mr. Dongguo's surprise, the hungry wolf pounces on him and announces its intention to eat him. When Mr. Dongguo protests at the wolf's ingratitude, the wolf presents the argument: since the scholar saved his life once why not do it again? Now that it is starving, only by serving as the wolf's food will the scholar have fulfilled the act of saving his life. The wolf also complains that it nearly suffocated while it was crammed in the scholar's bag and the scholar now owed him. Dongguo and the wolf debated and finally decided to present their case to the judgment of three elders.

The first elder they present their argument to is an old withering apricot tree. The tree relates its own experience to the two on how when it was young, children used to pick its fruits from its branches and the tree would tell them to eat their fill. Now it was about to be chopped down to provide firewood. The tree sides with the wolf. The wolf is very pleased.

The second elder they present their argument to was an elderly water buffalo. The buffalo tells its story of how it served its masters for many years dutifully providing him with milk and plowing his fields. Now his master wants to butcher it so he can eat its meat. The buffalo too sides with the wolf. The wolf grins and feels even more justified in his request to eat the scholar. Mr. Dongguo reminds the wolf that they have one more elder to seek out.

The last elder they present their argument to is an elderly farmer. The farmer is sceptical and doesn't believe that the wolf can fit into the bag. To illustrate its point, the wolf crawls back into the bag and right away the old farmer ties up the bag and starts to beat the wolf with his hoe. The farmer bashes the wolf to an inch of his life then unties the bag and drags his dying wolf out of the bag.

Seeing the pitiful wolf the scholar thinks that the old farmer was too cruel but just then a weeping woman comes running towards them. She points to the wolf and tells Mr. Dongguo and the farmer how it dragged off her little boy. Mr Dongguo now no longer pities the wolf. He picks up the hoe and strikes the final blow to the wolf's head.

== Author ==
The authorship of this text is a matter of dispute. The text originally appeared in the Gujin Shuohai as an anonymous text with no author listed but it has generally been attributed to Ma Zhongxi (Chinese: 馬中錫; pinyin: Mǎ Zhōngxí) (1446–1512). In classical Chinese literature, this tale is quite unusual in the fact that it is a fully developed animal fable. In most prose fables or poems where animals are imbued with human characteristics (e.g., Huli jing), they are usually first transformed into human form before they are allowed to speak.

The term Mr. Dongguo (Dōngguō Xiānshēng) has now become a Chinese idiom for a naive person who gets into trouble through being softhearted to evil people.

== Variations ==
Another variation of this tale can be found in the Precious Scroll of Shancai and Longnü.

Leo Tolstoy in one of his "readers" for elementary school has a similar story, entitled The Wolf and the Farmer (Russian: Волк и мужик).

== See also ==
- Big Bad Wolf
- The Three Little Pigs
- The Tiger, the Brahmin and the Jackal
- The Little Red Riding Hood
