= Niloofar Chaman =

Bangladeshi artist

- নীলুফার চমন
- Born: 1962 (age 62–63)
- Education: MA in Painting, Chittagong University, 1987
- Occupation: Artist

Niloofar Chaman is a Bangladeshi artist based in Chittagong, Bangladesh, whose work focuses on themes of social injustice and discrimination against women.

== Career ==
Niloofar Chaman's artistic style is characterized by bold forms and vivid colors, inspired by modelling found in Bengal folk art. Her work is part of the Chittagong art tradition which uses experimental methods and seeks to contain a strong sense of narrative. Her work seeks to highlight the absurdities and inequalities of wealth inequalities among a small percentage of society.

In the 1980s, her work was described as "strongly distinctive", and were originally monochromatic before including the flat application of bright primary colours. Her methods for oil painting sat in contrast to customary methods, instead using small strokes of the brush while keeping the rest of the canvas largely colorless.

In 1990, she received the Young Artists Award from the Bangladesh Shilpakala Academy.

Her known works include a series titled "Which Can Be Knotted", which was shown at the Fukuoka Asian Art Museum in 2002, representing both the wish to form strong bonds between people, as well as the suffocation created by strong relationships. She has also experimented with mixed media installations, for example at the 2010 Asian Biennale when she created an installation focused on the sound of birds. In 2016, her performance art was selected as a group of 20 diverse artists to be included in the Performance Art Week 2016, arranged by the Visual Arts Programme of Bengal Foundation. In 2019, her work was included in the 23rd National Art Exhibition held at the National Art Gallery of Bangladesh Shilpakala Academy.

== See also ==
- Women Artists of Bangladesh
