= Rumman =

Rumman (Arabic: رمان) or Rummanah (Arabic: رمانة) is the Arabic language word for 'pomegranate'.

Rumman or Rummanah may refer to:

== Places ==
=== Israel/Palestine ===
- Rumana, Israel, SWP map 6
- Rummanah, a Palestinian village in the Jenin Governorate, SWP map 8
- Kafr Rumman, a Palestinian town in the Tulkarm Governorate, SWP map 11
- Rammun, a Palestinian town in the Ramallah and al-Bireh Governorate, SWP map 14

=== Elsewhere ===
- Ras Rumman, a neighborhood of Manama, Bahrain
- Rumana subdistrict, Iraq
- Ain El Remmaneh, a suburb of Beirut, Lebanon
- Abu Rummaneh, a neighborhood west of Damascus, Syria
- Umm ar-Rumman, village in southern Syria

== Other ==
- Rumman Zia, Pakistani film maker

== See also ==
- Rimmon
- Ruman (disambiguation)
- Rumana (disambiguation)
