= Dwarkin =

Indian company

Dwarkin, formally known as Dwarkin & Son, founded in 1875, was an Indian enterprise for the sale of Western and Indian musical instruments based in Kolkata, and focused on the development of the hand-held harmonium.

== History ==
Dwarkin & Son was founded in 1875 by Dwarkanath Ghose as D. Ghosh and Sons at Lower Chitpur Road in Kolkata, mainly dealing piano tuning and repairing of musical instruments. Subsequently, it was renamed "Dwarkin", the name as coined by composer and writer, Upendrakishore Ray, combining the names of the founder and that of Thomas Dawkins, London, an instrument manufacturer from where the company imported musical instruments early on. Dwijendranath Tagore is credited with having used the imported instrument in 1860 in his private theatre, but it was probably a pedalled instrument which was cumbersome, or it was possibly some variation of the reed organ. Initially, it aroused curiosity but gradually people started playing it and Ghose took the initiative to modify it.

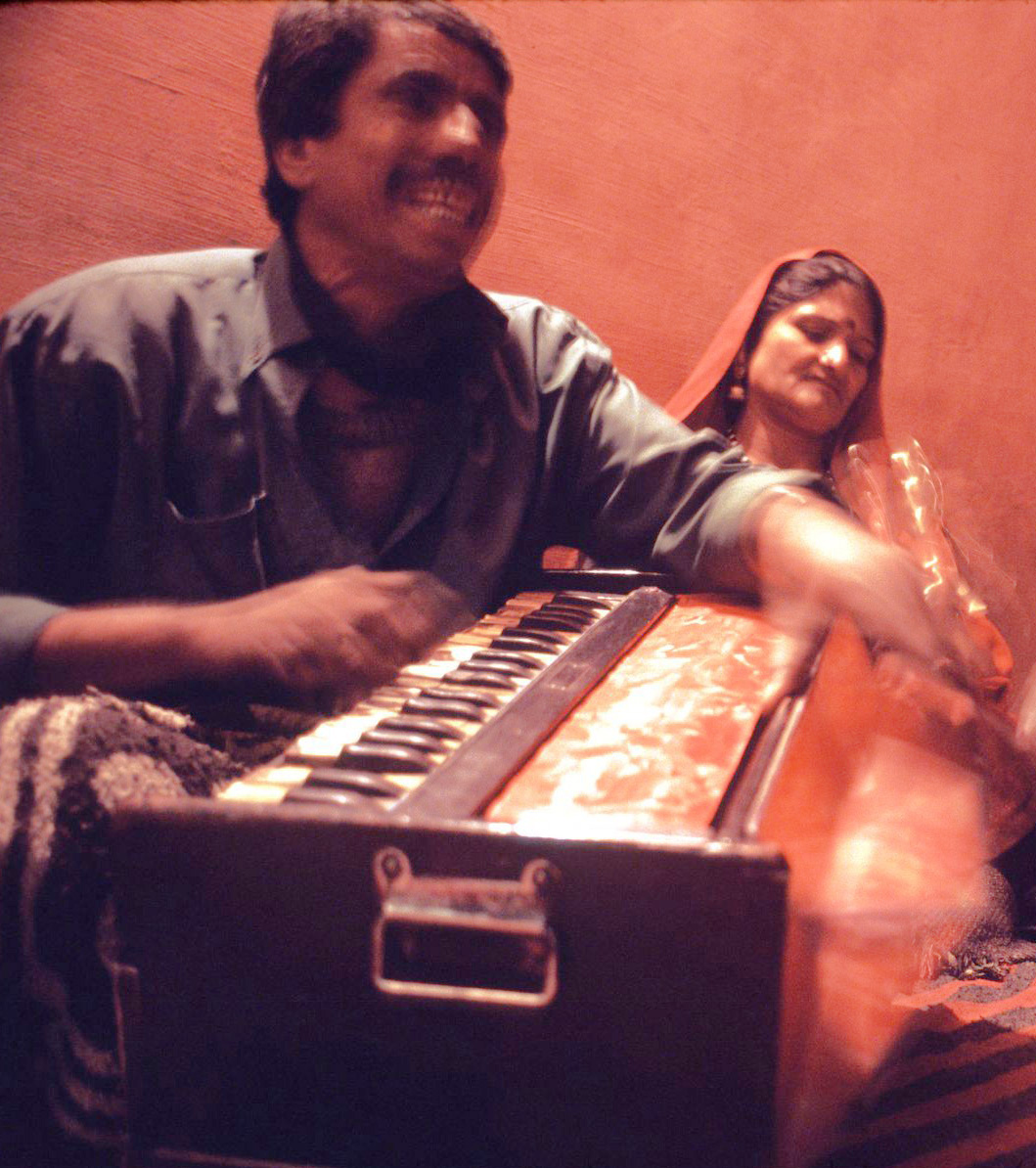
Man playing a harmonium. He is pumping the bellows of the harmonium with one hand and playing the keys with the other.
