= Tuntunir Boi =

1911 collection of children's stories by Upendrakishore Raychowdhury

Tuntunir Boi (Bengali: টুনটুনির বই) or The Tailor Bird's Book is a collection of children's stories by Upendrakishore Raychowdhury published in 1911. The stories are about a clever tailorbird who outsmarts a king, a barber and a cat. Other stories in the collection are also about encounters between different animals, and how wits win the day.

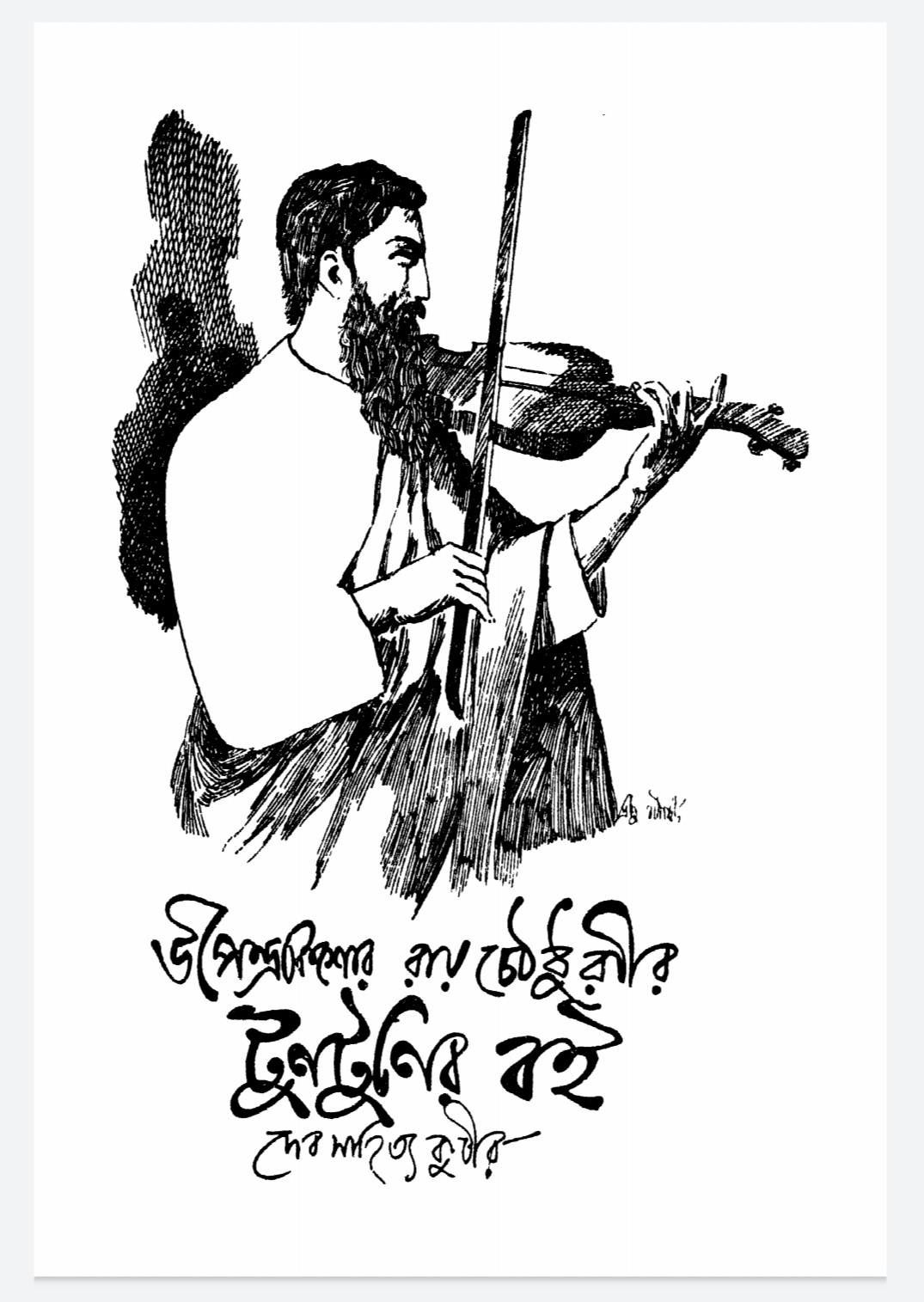
Tuntunir Boi - Cover
