= Bangla Academy Charitabhidhan =

- Cover of the book Bangla Academy Charitabhidhan
- Language: Bengali
- Genre: Biographical dictionary
- Publisher: Bangla Academy
- Publication date: 1985
- Publication place: Bangladesh
- Media type: Print

Bangla Academy Charitabhidhan (Bengali: বাংলা একাডেমী চরিতাভিধান, romanized: Bāṅlā Ēkāḍēmī Côritābhidhān) is a comprehensive biography dictionary edited by Selina Hossain and Nurul Islam. Initially published in 1985 under the title Choritabidhan (Biographical Dictionary), this seminal volume has undergone several editions. The second edition was released in 1997, followed by an expanded, refined, and revised third edition in 2011, published by the Bangla Academy.

The second edition incorporated portraits of approximately 700 prominent individuals and provided insights into the lives of nearly 1,000 notable Bengali intellectuals and luminaries.
