= Chitranibha Chowdhury =

20th-century Indian artist

- Born: Nibhanani Bose; 27 November 1912; Jiagunje, Bengal Presidency, British India
- Died: 9 November 1999 (aged 85); Kolkata, West Bengal, India
- Education: Kala Bhavana; Visva Bharati University
- Occupation: Painter
- Spouse: Niranjan Chowdhury
- Children: 2

Chitranibha Chowdhury (27 November 1913 – 9 November 1999) was a twentieth-century Indian artist, a member of the Bengal School of Art, and one of the first female painters in Bengal. She created over a thousand artworks, including landscapes, still lifes, decorative art, murals, and portraits. She was a Nandalal Bose student and the first female painting teacher in Kala Bhavana, Shantiniketan. Her real name Nibhanani Bose was changed to Chitranibha Bose by Rabindranath Tagore.

== Early life ==
She was born Nibhanani, to Saratkumari Devi and Dr. Bhagaban Chandra Bose at Jiagunje, in the Murshidabad district of present West Bengal. During her youth, her family relocated to Gomoh and then to Chandpur. There, in 1927, at the age of fourteen, her alpanas brought her to the attention of Monoranjan Chowdhury, a member of a highly educated and cultured Zamindar family of Lamchor, and he arranged for her to marry his younger brother, Niranjan Chowdhury.

== Life in Shantiniketan ==
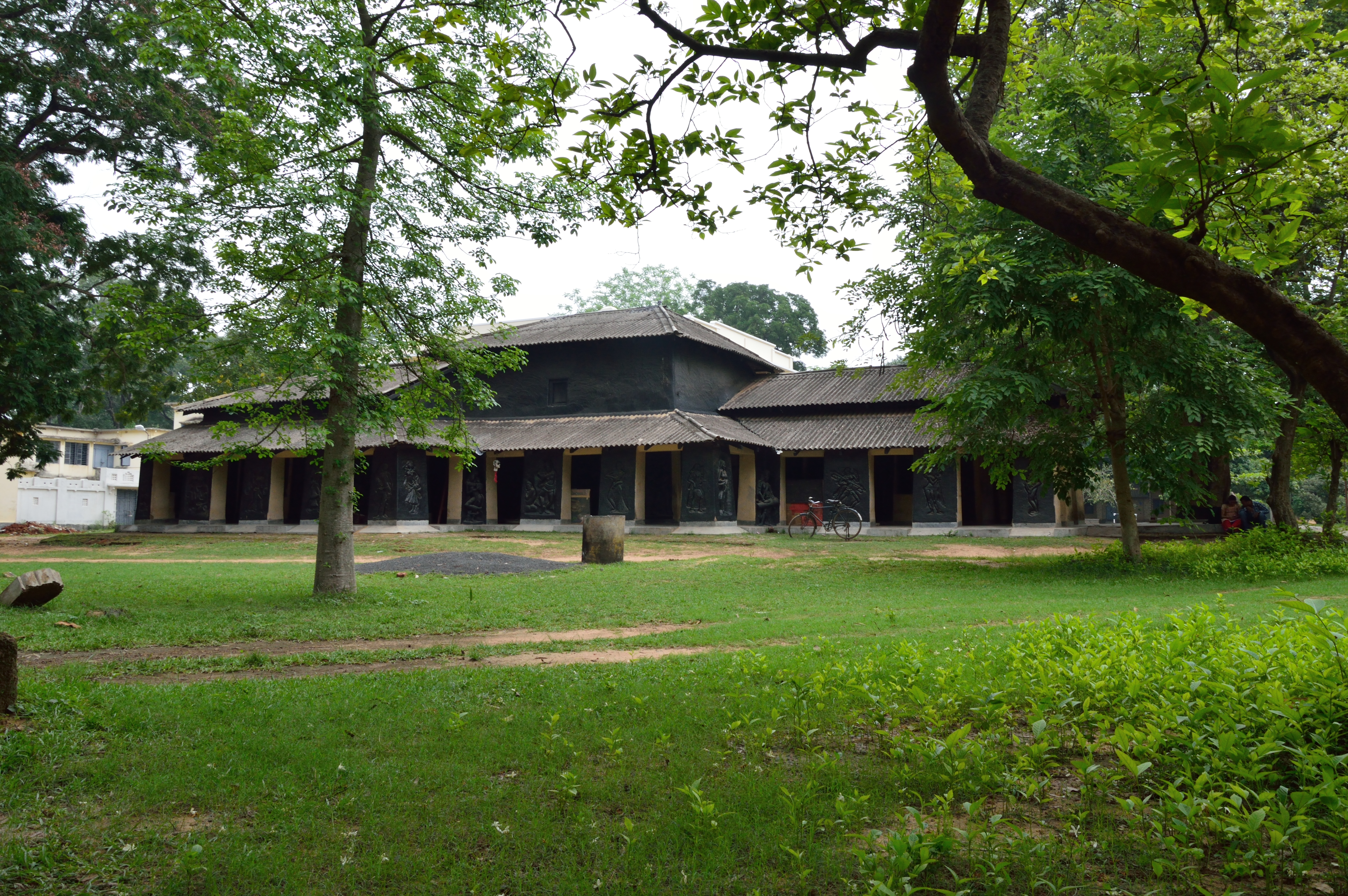
The Kalo Bari at Kala Bhavana

In 1928, Chodhury's in-laws sent her to Visva Bharati University, Shantiniketan, along with her husband. The founder and head of the university, Rabindranath Tagore, met with her and sent her to Nandalal Bose and Dinendranath Tagore to learn painting and music respectively at Kala Bhavana, the university's fine arts faculty. He subsequently gave her a new name, Chitranibha (Chitra means painting and Nibha means beauty), in light of her artistic skill. Chowdhury would later write a book entitled Rabindrasmriti, which provided a vivid account of how Rabindranath Tagore was her source of sustenance throughout her artistic career and life.

Chitranibha Chowdhury's training in art continued for five years under the supervision of Nandalal Bose. During this time, she participated in the construction of the famous Kalo Bari (Black House) at Kala Bhavana, along with Ramkinkar Baij and others. Her mural work, Shiber Biye, is still preserved. She received special permission to paint portraits of visitors to Shantiniketan - these include several eminent figures of Indian political and cultural history, such as Mahatma Gandhi, Hazari Prasad Dwivedi, C. Rajagopalachari, Bidhan Chandra Roy, Khan Abdul Ghaffar Khan, Niels Bohr, and Sarojini Naidu, and were later praised by art critics. Pieces of her work were published in the journal Jayshree. After the completion of her formal training at Kala Bhavana in 1934, she joined the faculty as the first female professor in 1935, at the wish of Rabindranath Tagore and Nandalal Bose.

== Mural at Noakhali ==
In 1937, she had to resign her position at Kala Bhavan and join her in-laws' household at Noakhali, but she continued to produce art in as many ways as possible. She engaged the women of her village in music, art, and craft and established an institution of her own. She organised exhibitions of village crafts at the Durga Puja festivals.

In Noakhali, Chowdhury created a mural at 12 Topkhana Road, Shegunbagicha, the residence of her brother-in-law Professor J.K Chowdhury of the Department of Chemistry, Dhaka University. The entire mural survived until 2010, when it was destroyed during renovation of the building. In the late 1940s, Chowdhury returned to Shantiniketan in order to have her daughter educated at Visva Bharati.

== Later life ==
After Partition in 1947, Chowdhury and her family relocated to Kolkata. There she joined Bani Bhavan, an institute that trained poor women in arts and crafts. She taught there from 1960 to 1973. Retrospectives of her works were presented in Kolkata at the Academy of Fine Arts in 1976 and at the Birla Academy of Art and Culture in 1982. She died in 1999. She had two children: a daughter, Chitralekha Chowdhury, a physicist and singer who has preserved many of her works, and a son, Ranajit Chowdhury.

== List of paintings ==
Chowdhury's work included episodes and characters from ancient Indian literature, landscapes, depictions of life in rural Bengal, and portraits. She painted in watercolours, oils, pastels, and crayons.

Some of the notable paintings by Chitranibha Chowdhury:

- Shiber Biye (mural in Kalo Bari, Santiniketan)
- Santhali Family
- Santhal Marriage
- Gosthojatra
- Ekalabya
- Kadamba Flowers
- Palash
- Basanta Utsab at Santiniketan
- Jyotshna Plabito Math
- Raaga Behaag
- Jhorer Agey
- Valmiki Pratibha
- Kadam
- Pumpkin Blossom
- Dhruva
- Noneechora
- Durga Puja Celebration at Bangladesh
