= Ruman (surname) =

Ruman is a surname. Notable people with the surname include:

- Amy Ruman (born 1974), American racing driver
- Evgeny Ruman (born 1979), Israeli film and television director, film editor, and screenwriter
- Petr Ruman (born 1976), Czech footballer
- Sig Ruman (1884–1967), German-American actor
- Um Ruman (7th century), sahaba of Muhammad
