= Farida Zaman =

Bangladeshi artist

- ফরিদা জামান
- Born: 1953 (age 72–73); Chandpur, East Bengal, Dominion of Pakistan
- Occupation: Artist
- Awards: Ekushey Padak(2020)

Farida Zaman (born 1953) is a Bangladeshi artist and illustrator. She is the chairman and professor of the department of Drawing and Painting at the Faculty of Fine Arts, University of Dhaka. In recognition of her contribution in art, the government of Bangladesh awarded her the country's second highest civilian award Ekushey Padak in 2020.

== Early life ==
Zaman was born in 1953 in Chandpur of the then East Bengal in Pakistan (now Bangladesh). She graduated in fine arts from the Bangladesh College of Arts and Crafts (now Faculty of Fine Arts, University of Dhaka) in 1974 and received her post graduation degree in the same subject from the Maharaja Sayajirao University of Baroda, India in 1978. She obtained her PhD from India's Visva-Bharati University in 1995.

== Solo exhibitions ==
- College of Art & Crafts, Dhaka, Bangladesh (1979)
- Institute of Fine Arts, University of Dhaka, Bangladesh (1983)
- Divine Art Gallery, Dhaka, Bangladesh (1995)
- Chitrak Art Gallery, Dhaka, Bangladesh (2002)
- My Country-My Love Bengal Gallery of Fine Arts, Dhaka, Bangladesh (2006)
- Rabindranath Thakur Centre, ICCR, Kolkata, India (2010)
- Bound to the Soil, Bengal Gallery of Fine Arts, Dhaka, Bangladesh (2013)
- For the Love of Country, Nalini Kanta Bhattasali Gallery of Bangladesh National Museum (2019)
