= Ferdousi Priyabhashini =

Bangladeshi sculptor (1947–2018)

- ফেরদৌসী প্রিয়ভাষিণী
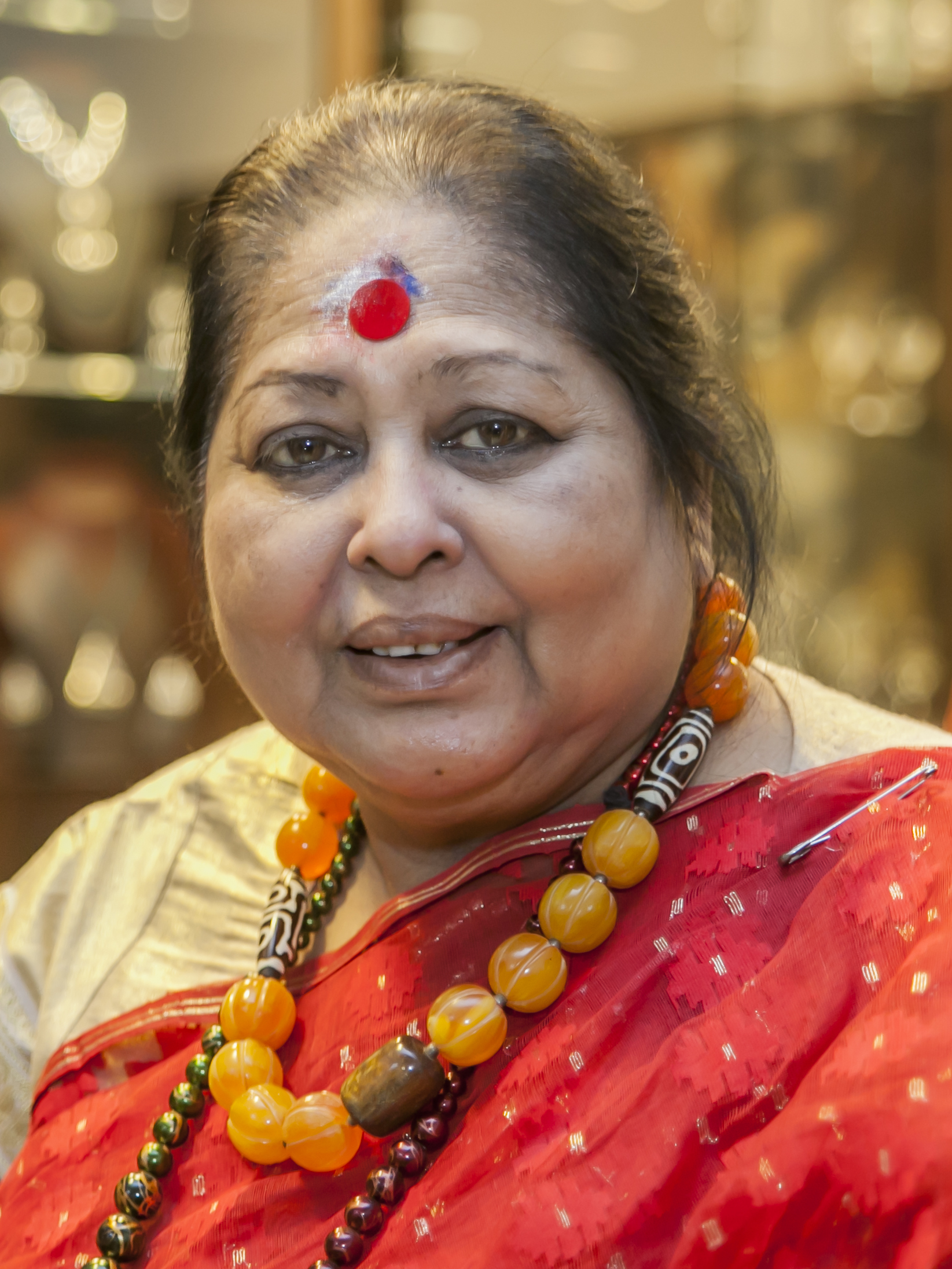
- Priyabhashini in 2017
- Born: 19 February 1947; Khulna District, Bengal Presidency, British India
- Died: 6 March 2018 (aged 71); Dhaka, Bangladesh
- Occupation: Sculptor
- Spouse: Ahsanullah Ahmed (m. 1972)
- Awards: Independence Award (2010)
- Website: ferdousypriyabhashiny.weebly.com

Ferdousi Priyabhashini (19 February 1947 – 6 March 2018) was a Bangladeshi sculptor. She was the first one to publicly announce herself as Birangona, a term coined by Sheikh Mujibur Rahman for the rape victims of the Liberation War of Bangladesh in 1971. Government of Bangladesh awarded her Independence Day Award in 2010.

== Early life and career ==
Priyabhashini was born on 19 February 1947 in Khulna, Bangladesh to her parents Rowshan Hasina and Syed Mahbubul Hoque. Priyabhashini was married to an artist in 1963. She worked in a jute mill to support her family, but the financial problems grew and the couple got separated in 1971.

Priyabhashini later became a sculptor. Since 1990, she had displayed her works through exhibitions. Her first exhibition was jointly inaugurated by artist SM Sultan and poet Sufia Kamal, and anchored by Syed Shamsul Haque.

The 2015 play Jamuna draws inspiration from Priyabhashini's life and artwork.

== Personal life ==
Priyabhashini married Ahsanullah Ahmed in 1972. Together they have three sons and three daughters.

== Exhibitions ==
1. Charupith, Jessore, 1991
2. Bengal Foundation, Dhaka, 1994
3. Jozon Art Gallery, Dhaka, 1994
4. Bangladesh Shilpokala Academy, Dhaka, 1996
5. Dhaka Art Centre Gallery, Dhaka, 1996
6. Bangladesh National Museum, 1999
7. Bengal Gallery of Fine Arts, Dhaka, 2002
8. Shilpangan Gallery, Dhaka, 2004
9. In the Deep Days of Monsoon = Emana ghanaghora barishāẏa, 2004
10. Shilpangan Gallery, Dhaka, 2006
11. Branches and twigs = Sā̄khā praśākhā, 2007
12. Dots Gallery, Dhaka, 2007
13. Bengal Gallery of Fine Arts, Dhaka, 2010
14. Dhaka Art Centre, Dhaka, 2010
15. Light and shadow = Raudra chāẏā : duet art exhibition, 2013
16. Prelude to a monsoon evening = Nāmila Śrābaṇa sandhyā, 2015

== Awards ==
- Independence Day Award (2010)
- Hero by the Reader's Digest magazine (2004)
- Chadernath Podok
- Ananna Shirshow Podok
- Silver Jubilee Award by YWCA
- Human Rights Award by Manabadhikar Sangstha
