= Rumana Monzur =

Rumana Monzur is an assistant professor of Dhaka University, a Fulbright scholar and a graduate student in political science from University of British Columbia. In June 2011, she was brutally attacked and blinded by her husband at the time Hasan Sayeed Sumon during a visit to her home country Bangladesh. Her husband assaulted her because she wanted to continue higher education in Canada against his wishes. He justified this assault to the Bangladeshi media by alleging that Rumana had been unfaithful. Her case caught widespread media attention around the world due to ongoing domestic violence against women in Bangladesh and violation of the fundamental right of education. Rumana returned to Vancouver in July 2011 for further treatment but surgeries in both her eyes were unsuccessful, leaving not much hope for her to see ever again. Rumana's ex-husband died in prison in December 2011.

She, nevertheless, continued her studies and in 2017 she received a degree in law from University of British Columbia, Canada. She has now an advisory job at the Department of Justice Canada in Vancouver.
