= Upendrakishore Ray Chowdhury =

Bengali writer and illustrator

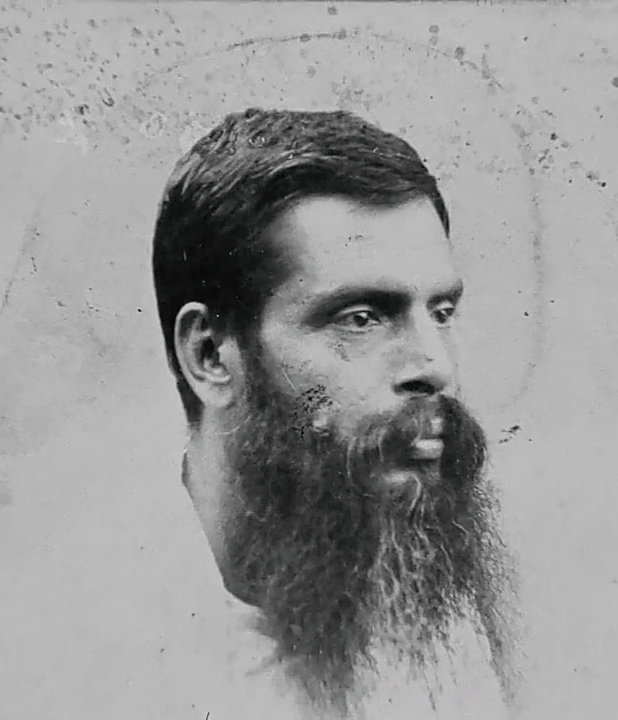
- Pronunciation: [upend̪ɾokiʃoɾ rae̯ t͡ʃou̯d̪ʱuɾi]
- Born: Kamadaranjan Ray; 12 May 1863; Katiadi, Mymensingh, Bengal Presidency, British Raj (now Kishoreganj, Bangladesh)
- Died: 20 December 1915 (aged 52); Calcutta, Bengal Presidency, British Raj (now Kolkata, West Bengal, India)
- Known for: Writer; painter
- Spouse(s): Bidhumukhi Devi (daughter of Dwarkanath Ganguly and stepdaughter of Kadambini Ganguly)
- Children: 6, including Shukhalata Rao, Punyalata Chakraborty, Sukumar Ray
- Father: Kalinath Ray (biological father) HariKishore Ray Chowdhury (adoptive father)
- Relatives: Satyajit Ray (grandson)

Upendrakishore Ray Chowdhury (Note: Bengali: [upend̪ɾokiʃoɾ rae̯ t͡ʃou̯d̪ʱuɾi].) (Bengali: [upend̪ɾokiʃoɾ rae̯ t͡ʃou̯d̪ʱuɾi]; 12 May 1863 – 20 December 1915) was a Bengali writer, painter and entrepreneur. He was the son-in-law of reformer Dwarkanath Ganguly.

== Family history ==
According to the history of the Ray family, one of their ancestors, Shri Ramsunder Deb, was a native of Chakdah village in Nadia district of present-day West Bengal, India. In search of fortune, he migrated to Sherpur in East Bengal. There he met Raja Gunichandra, the zamindar of Jashodal, at the zamindar house of Sherpur. King Gunichandra was immediately impressed by Ramsunder's beautiful appearance and sharp intellect and took Ramsunder with him to his zamindari estate. He made Ramsunder his son-in-law and granted him some property in Jashodal, Kishorganj. From then on, Ramsunder started living in Jashodal. His descendants migrated from there and settled down in the village of Masua in the Katiadi upazila of the Kishoreganj district.

== Life ==
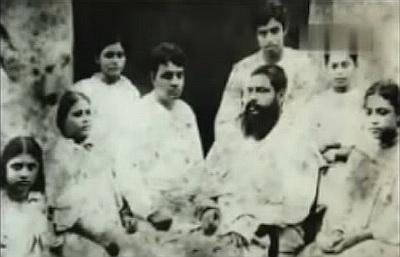
Ray with his wife and six children

Upendrakishore Ray Chowdhury was born on 12 May 1863, in a little village called Moshua in Mymensingh District of Bengal (now Kishoreganj District in Bangladesh). He spent most of his adult life in Calcutta, where he died on 20 December 1915, aged only fifty-two. (Note: Modern Review gives 1862 as the year of his birth. The Satyajit Ray Society states it is 1863. Banglapedia says it is 10 May 1863.)

He was born as Kamadaranjan Ray to Kalinath Ray, a scholar in Sanskrit, Arabic and Persian. His elder brother Saradaranjan Ray was one of the pioneers of Indian cricket who was called the W.G. Grace of India. At the age of five, Kamadaranjan was adopted by Harikishore, a family relative who was a zamindar in Mymensingh. Harikishore renamed his adopted son as Upendrakishore Roychowdhury and added the honorific 'Raychaudhuri' as a surname.

Ray Chowdhury passed the entrance examination in 1880 with a scholarship from Mymensingh Zilla School. He studied for a while at Presidency College, then affiliated with the University of Calcutta, but passed the BA examination in 1884 from the Calcutta Metropolitan Institution (now Vidyasagar College). Upendra took to drawing while in school. He published his first literary work in the magazine Sakha in 1883.

His father, Kalinath Ray, was an expert in both English and Persian and also in the traditional Indian and Anglo-Indian legal systems. He became an eminent expert in interpreting old land deeds written in Persian and in helping the landowners get the best deal from the newly introduced British legal system in India. He became affluent, and in due course, his family was able to afford two elephants.

== Blockmaker, printer and publisher ==
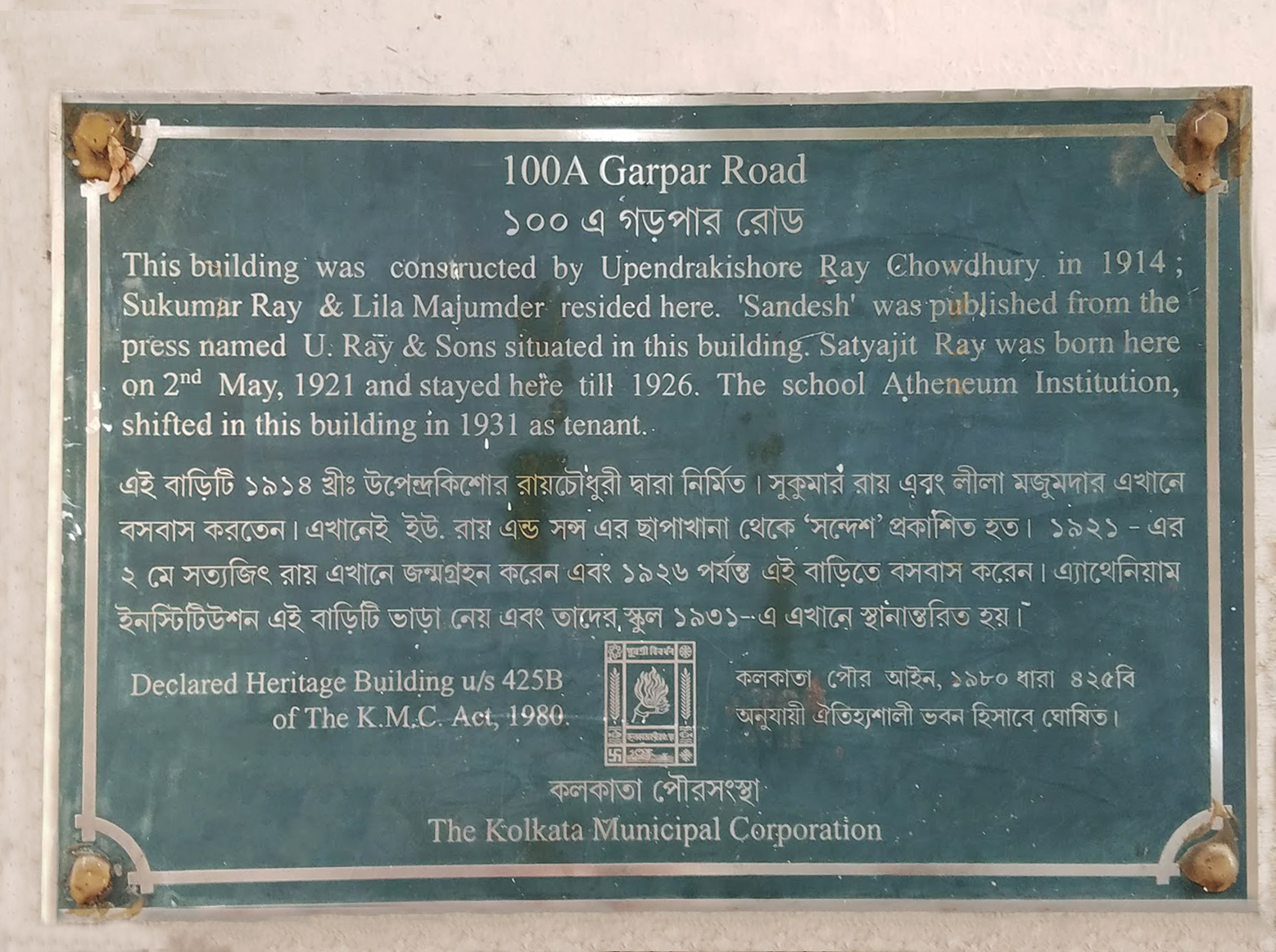
House of Upendrakishore at 100 A Garpar Road, Kolkata Heritage Building, plaque by KMC

Upendrakishore first introduced modern blockmaking, including half-tone and colour blockmaking, in South Asia. When the reproduction using woodcut line blocks of his illustrations for one of his books, Chheleder Ramayan, was very poor, he imported books, chemicals and equipment from Britain to learn the technology of blockmaking. After mastering this, in 1895 he successfully set up a business, U. Ray and Sons, of making blocks at 7 Shibnarain Lane, which then became his residence-cum-workplace. He experimented with the process of advanced blockmaking, and several of his technical articles about blockmaking were published in the Penrose Annual Volumes published from Britain. In his own lifetime, a printing expert from abroad commented that Upendrakishore's contribution was far more original than that of his counterparts in Europe and America, "which is all the more surprising when we consider how far he is from hub-centres of process work". He also went on publishing books, but initially he had them printed in other printing presses. His residence and business were located at 22, Sukeas Street (now the premises has been renamed 30B, Mahendra Srimany Street) from 1901 to 1914. The Sandesh magazine was first published here in 1913 (Baisakh Bengali year 1320).

In 1914 he founded what was then probably the finest printing press in South Asia, U. Ray and Sons, at 100 Garpar Road. Even the building plans were designed by him. He quickly earned recognition in India and abroad for the new methods he developed for printing both black and white and colour photographs with great accuracy of detail. It was with the intention of running this business that his son Sukumar Ray spent a few years at the University of Manchester's printing technology department.

== Technological innovations ==
He invented several techniques related to halftone blockmaking, of which the "screen-adjusting machine" for the automatic focusing of process cameras was also assembled in England following his design. The British handbook of printing technology, the Penrose Annual, Volume X, 1904–05, mentioned about him in an editorial note that, "Mr. Ray is evidently possessed of a mathematical quality of mind and he has reasoned out for himself the problems of half-tone work in a remarkably successful manner ... (His printing developments) enable the operator to do uniform work with the fullest graduation and detail in it and with the minimum amount of manipulative skill in the negative-making and etching." The Penrose Annual Volume XI of 1905–06 published his paper about the new technique of 60-degree screens in halftone blockmaking.

== Author ==
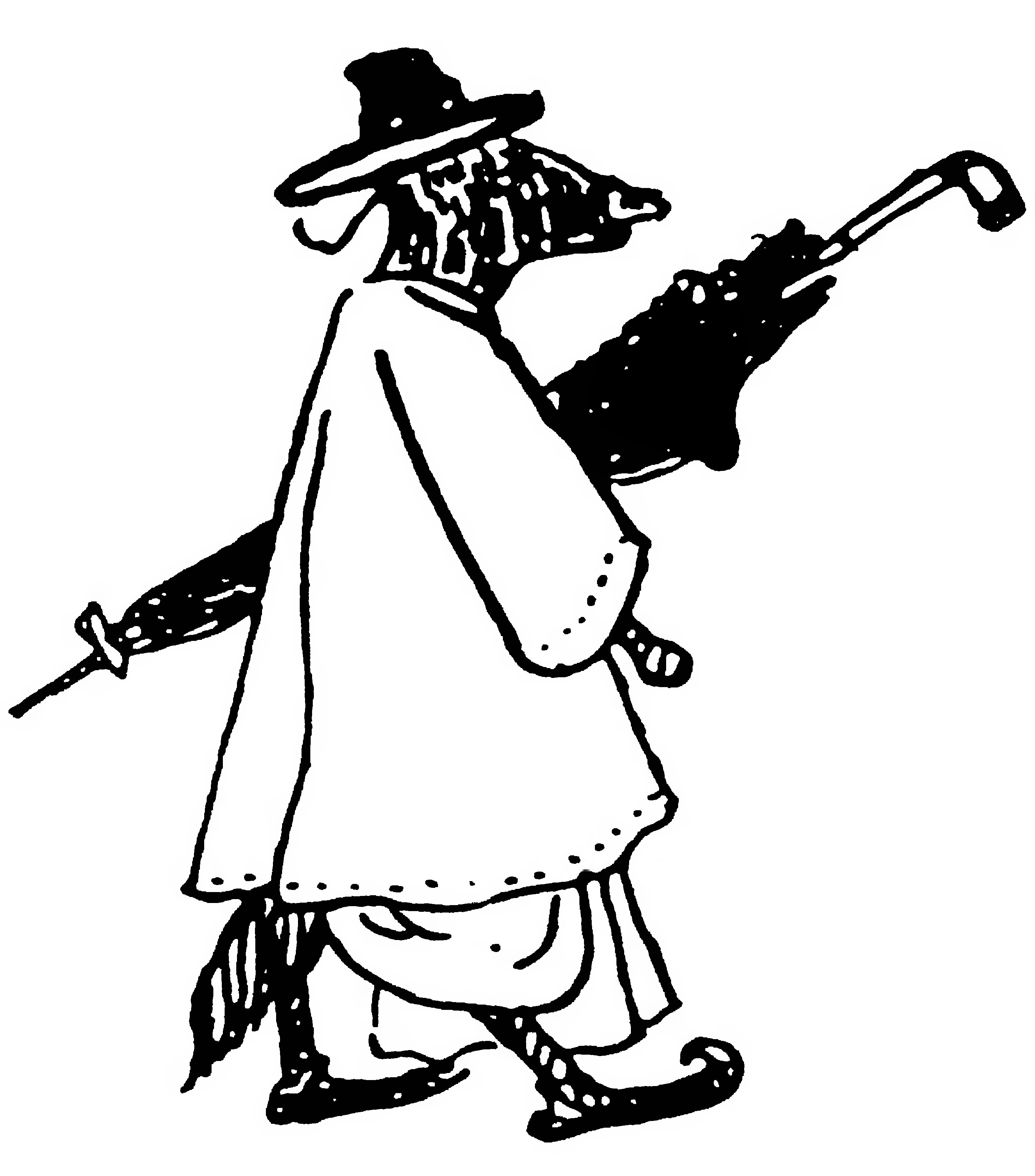
Illustration from Rachana Samagra, 1910

"Cheleder Ramayana" was the first book by Upendrakishore Ray Chowdhury. He embraced the liberal religious movement of Brahmo Samaj in 1883, after the death of his foster-father and was a deeply religious man, but his scientific bent of mind is reflected in the numerous science articles he wrote for children. He published two books on popular science, which were classics in the Bengali language. "Sekaler Katha" described the geological history of Earth and the ancient animals like dinosaurs. "Aakasher Katha" was an enthralling account of astronomy. His scientific interests were further nurtured by his close friendship with the scientists Acharya Jagadish Chandra Bose and Acharya Prafulla Chandra Ray, all of whom lived and worked very close to each other. He also published a well known collection of children's stories called Tuntunir Boi. He further wrote Gupi Gyne, a fantasy novel (later adapted into the film Goopy Gyne Bagha Byne); essays like Daasotto Pratha (regarding slavery in the United States), Sandow (on Eugen Sandow); and travelogues like Puri, Abar Purite (on Puri, Odisha) and Megher Muluk (on Darjeeling). One of the books he wrote is Chotoder Shera Biggan Rochona Shongkolon.

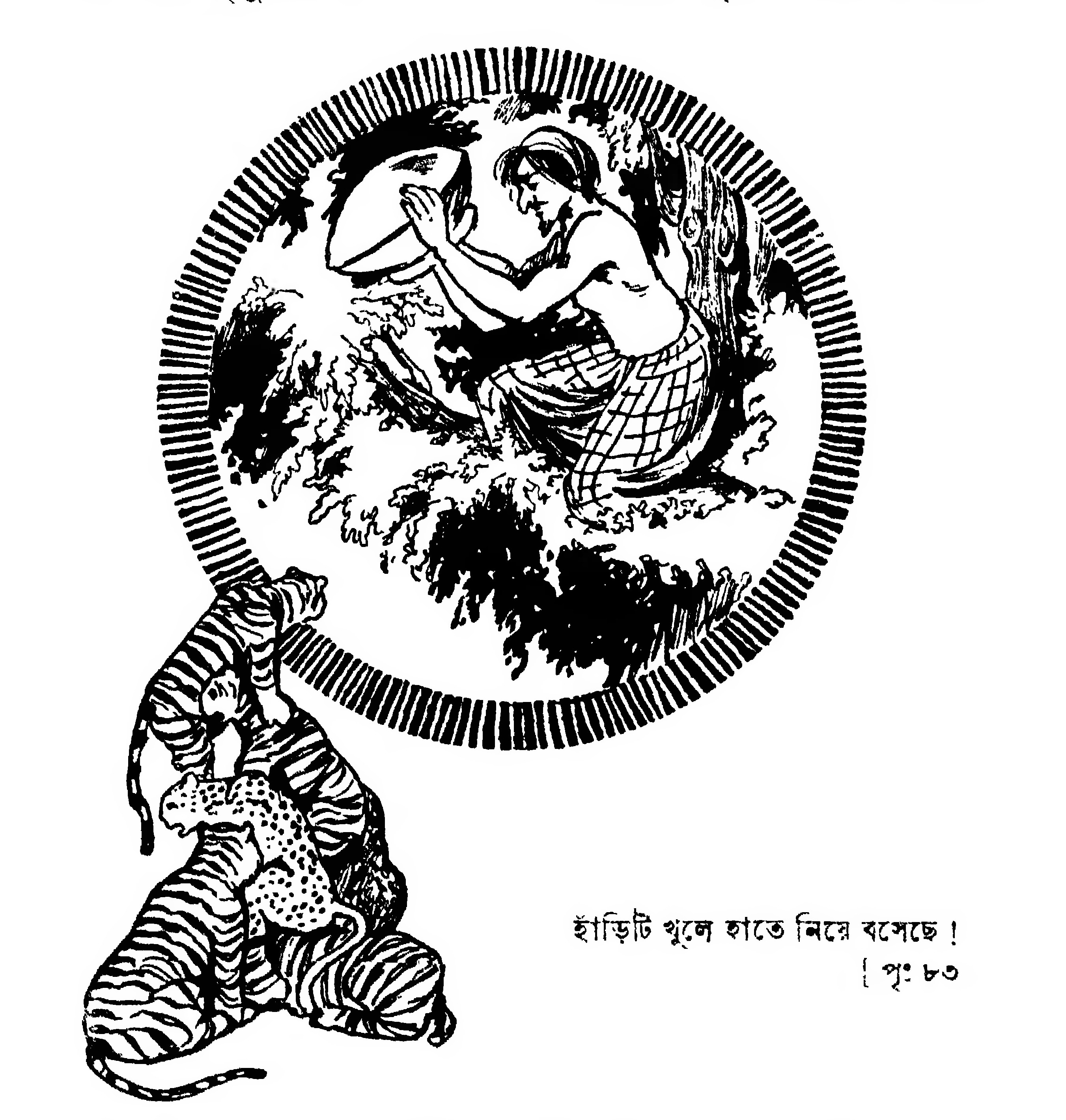
Illustration from Tuntunir Boi, 1920

Also a musician, Upendrakishore wrote two books about music in Bengali – Sohaj Behala Shikkha, about learning to play the violin, and Sikhak Batorike Harmonium, about learning to play the harmonium as an accompaniment to Indian music. These were published by Dwarkin & Son, which was a famous music firm of the times, established by Dwarkanath Ghose, the inventor of the hand-harmonium. (Upendrakishore coined the name for the firm in 1875).

== Children ==
Upendrakishore's eldest daughter, Shukhalata Rao, became a social worker, children's book author and editor of a newspaper, Alok. She founded the Shishu-o-Matri Mangal Kendro (Centre for the Welfare of Children and Mothers) and the Orissa Nari Seva Sangha.

He had six children. His eldest son was the famous Sukumar Ray. His first daughter was the children's author Shukhalata Rao. His second daughter was Punyalata Chakraborty and his youngest daughter was Shantilata. His second son was Subinoy Ray (Note: Not to be confused with Subinoy Roy.) and his youngest son was Subimal Ray.
