= Shukhalata Rao =

Indian social worker, artist and children's book author

Sukhalata Rao
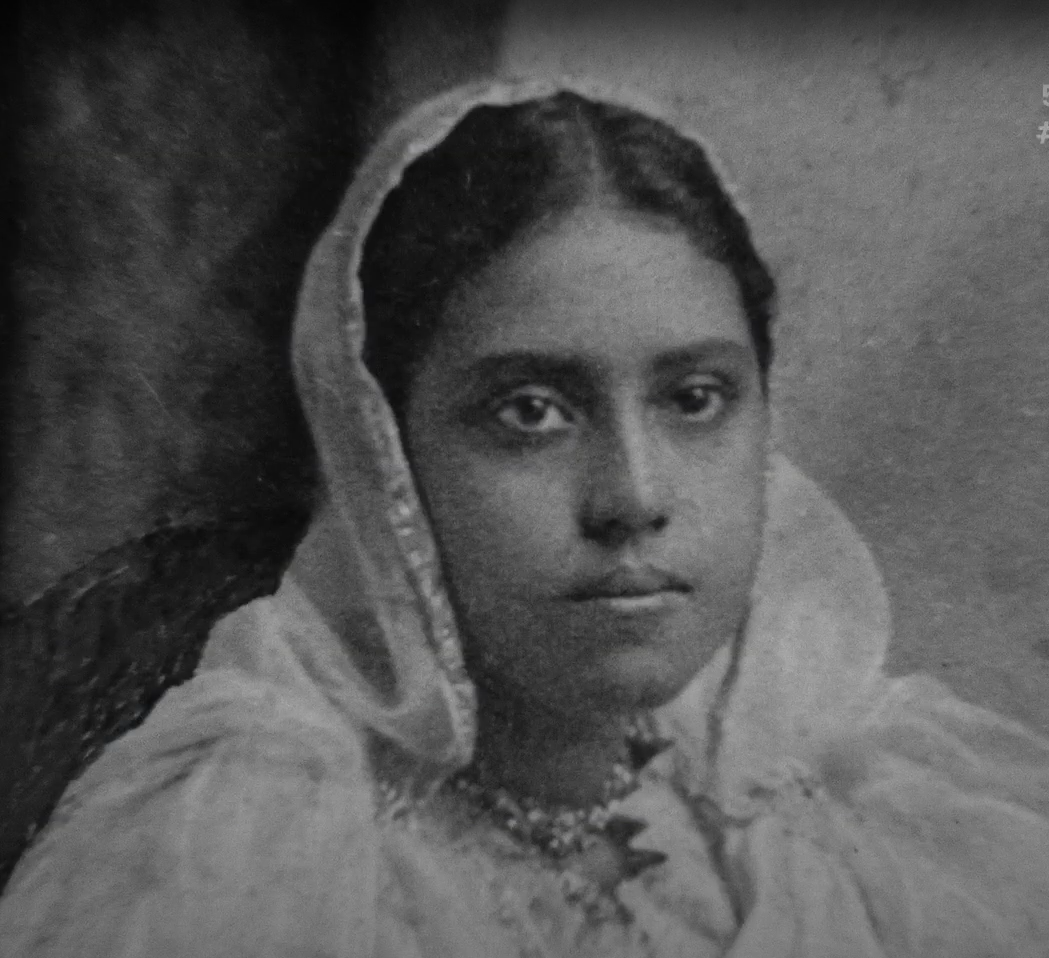
- Born: 23 October 1886; Calcutta, Bengal, British India (present-day Kolkata, West Bengal, India)
- Died: 9 July 1969 (aged 82); Calcutta, West Bengal, India
- Education: Bethune College; Visva-Bharati University
- Occupations: Writer, illustrator
- Notable work: Behula, Nije Pora
- Movement: Bengal School of Art
- Father: Upendra Kishore Ray
- Relatives: Sukumar Ray (brother); Satyajit Ray (nephew)
- Awards: Kaiser-e-Hind in 1956 for her book Nije Pora

Shukhalata Rao (1886–1969) was an Indian social worker, artist and children's book author. Born in Calcutta in the Bengal province of British India, she was the daughter of Upendrakishore Ray Chowdhury, and sister of Sukumar Ray. She studied in Bethune College, and obtained a bachelor's degree.

She married Dr Jayanta Rao from Cuttack. After moving to Cuttack, Shukhalata founded the Shishu-o-Matri Mangal Kendro ('Centre for the Welfare of Children and Mothers'). She also established the Orissa Nari Seva Sangha.

Shukhalata was the editor of Alok, a newspaper. Her writings include children's stories, and fairy tales.

== Selected works ==
=== Books ===
- Galpa-ar-Galpa
- Galper Boi (1912)
- Aro Galpa (1916)
- Khoka Elo Beriye (1916)
- Natun Para (1922)
- Shonar Mayur
- Natun Chhora (1952)
- Bideshi Chora (1962)
- Nanan Desher Rupkatha
- Pather Alo
- Aesoper Golpo
- Living Lights
- Nije Pora
- Behula

=== Bengali play ===
- Atar Muchir Goppo

== Awards ==
Shukhalata Rao was given the Kaiser-e-Hind award by the colonial government for social service and received a literary award by the Government of India in 1956 for her book Nije Pora.
