= Sayeed Ahmed =

Bangladeshi dramatist, playwright, writer and sitar player

- সাঈদ আহমদ
- Born: 1 January 1931; Dhaka, Bengal Presidency, British India
- Died: 21 January 2010 (aged 79); Dhaka, Bangladesh
- Education: University of Dhaka; Dhaka Collegiate School
- Occupation: Playwright
- Father: Mirza F Mohammad
- Relatives: Nazir Ahmed (brother); Hamidur Rahman (brother)

Sayeed Ahmed (1 January 1931 – 21 January 2010) was a Bangladeshi dramatist, playwright, writer and sitar player. He was awarded Bangla Academy Literary Award in 1974 and Ekushey Padak in 2010 by the Government of Bangladesh.

== Background ==
Ahmed was born on 1 January 1931 at Islampur in Old Dhaka in the-then Bengal Presidency in British India into a Mirza family. His mother was Jamila Khatun. His father, Mirza Fakir Mohammad, was the owner of a commercial theatre, Lion Theatre, at Islampur. Ahmed had three elder brothers – Nasir Ahmed, radio personality and journalist Nazir Ahmed and painter Hamidur Rahman. Ahmed studied at Dhaka Collegiate School. He completed his bachelor's in international studies from the University of Dhaka. He later studied for his master's at the London School of Economics in 1954. In 1956, Ahmed moved back to Lahore and joined the public service.

== Career ==
Ahmed, along with Shamsur Rahman and Hasan Hafizur Rahman, compose and wrote radio plays in the early 1950s. He played sitar in BBC and acted on stage in London and New York. He was the sitarist during the Europe tour of Uday Shankar.

Ahmed served as the secretary of Ministry of Youth and Sports and the director general of Bangladesh Television. He served as guest lecturer in Georgetown University, and other academies in Brazil, China, France, Germany, The Netherlands, India, Japan, Malaysia and Russia.

== Personal life ==
Ahmed was married to Parvin Ahmed. He had two brothers - journalist Nazir Ahmed and sculptor Hamidur Rahman.

== Works ==
- Kalbela (originally written as The Thing in English; 1962)
- Milepost (1965)
- Trishnay (1968)
- Ek Din Protidin (1974)
- Shesh Nawab (1988)

Ahmed's plays was translated into French, German, Italian, Urdu and Punjabi and were staged by different troupes in Bangladesh, India, Pakistan and United States. He created "Bishwa Natok", a program in Bangladesh Television, where he introduced and directed plays of international fame.

== Awards ==
- Bangla Academy Literary Award (1974)
- Legion of Honour from the French Government (1993)
- Shilpakala Academy Award (2007)
- Ekushey Padak (2010)
