= Novera Ahmed =

Bangladeshi artist (1939 – 2015)

- নভেরা আহমেদ
- Novera Ahmed
- Born: 29 March 1939; Sundarbans, Bengal Presidency, British India
- Died: 6 May 2015 (aged 76); Paris, France
- Education: Camberwell College of Arts
- Occupations: Sculptor; painter
- Years active: 1961–1973, 2014
- Known for: Original design of the Central Shaheed Minar
- Awards: Ekushey Padak; Independence Award

Novera Ahmed (29 March 1939 – 6 May 2015) was a Bangladeshi modern sculptor. She was awarded the Ekushey Padak medal by the government of Bangladesh in 1997 and Independence Award in 2025. Artist Zainul Abedin described her work saying "What Novera is doing now will take us a long time to understand – she is that kind of an artist."

== Early life and education ==
Novera Ahmed was born on 29 March 1939, in Sundarbans in the then Bengal Presidency, British India, whilst her family were there for a crocodile hunt. Her ancestral home was in Chittagong. Ahmed's mother made figures and doll houses out of clay, a traditional craft she was highly skilled in, and this led to Ahmed's fascination with three-dimensional forms. She studied in Calcutta and Comilla. In 1955 she was awarded a diploma in design in the modeling and sculpture course from Camberwell College of Arts in London. Her sister was already living in the city. At Camberwell, she studied under the British sculptor Jacob Epstein and Karel Vogel of Czechoslovakia. In 1966, she met Danish artist Asger Jorn in Paris. She studied European sculpture under the sculptor Venturino Venturi in Florence and later in Vienna. She was influenced by many western modern sculptors such as Henry Moore.

== Career ==
Ahmed jointly worked with Hamidur Rahman on the original design of the Shaheed Minar, Dhaka. During 1956–1960, she had done about 100 sculptures in Dhaka. She created the first frieze at the Dhaka Central Public Library in 1957.

Out of her 100 sculptures, 33 sculptures are currently in Bangladesh National Museum. Ahmed's first exhibition was held in University of Dhaka in 1960. Another exhibition of her works was held in Lahore in 1961. Her last exhibition was also held in Paris in July 1973.

In 1997, Ahmed was awarded the Ekushey Padak medal, the second highest civilian award in Bangladesh, in recognition of her work.

== Style and technique ==
Ahmed's early works resembled geometrical forms made by stones and concrete and anthropomorphic forms - mixing the human figure and animals. Then she used iron and steel and later bronze. She began spray paintings, using plane crash remains from the US army in the Vietnam War (1964–1969).

After a bad car accident on Christmas Eve 1973, whilst in her 30s, Ahmed used a wheelchair. After this, her drawings included shapes and figures of a meditative character: space, island, birds in the sky, phoenix, flowers, water, sunshine and the moon, minimalist landscapes, human figures turned toward a new horizon and others.

== Personal life ==
Ahmed was married to a police officer in mid 1954 in Calcutta. The couple got divorced in late 1954. She lived in Thailand between 1968 and 1970. Ahmed moved to France in the 1970s and lived there for the rest of her life. She married Gregoire de Brouhns in 1984.

== Death and legacy ==
Ahmed suffered a stroke in 2010. She died on 6 May 2015 at a hospital in Paris, France.

In August 2017, the ministry of cultural affairs of the government of Bangladesh announced a plan to purchase ten paintings by Ahmed for $47,000. The Musee Novera Ahmed at La Roche-Guyon was set up by her husband.

== Selected works ==
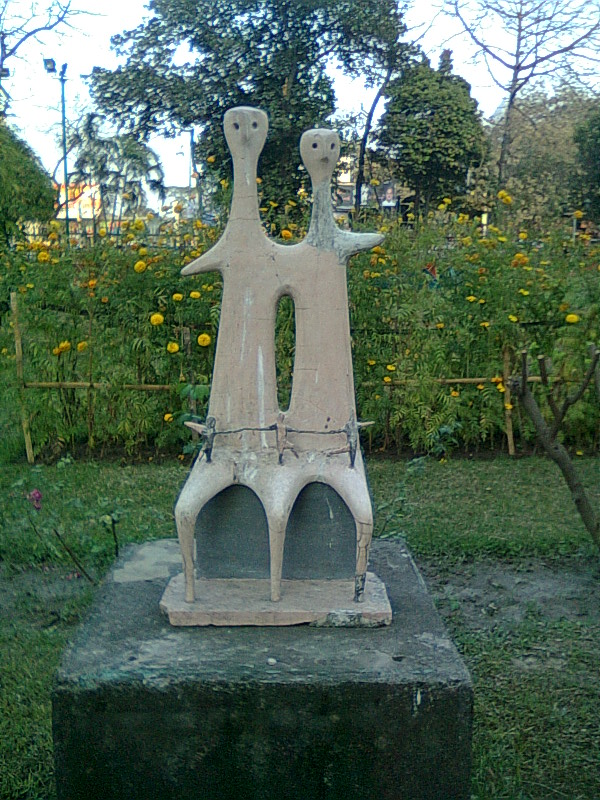
Composition

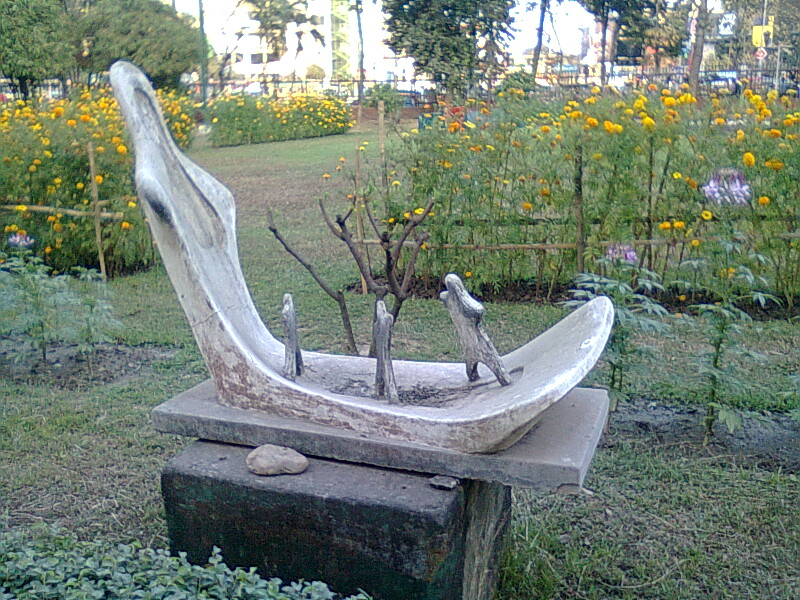
Reclining Figure

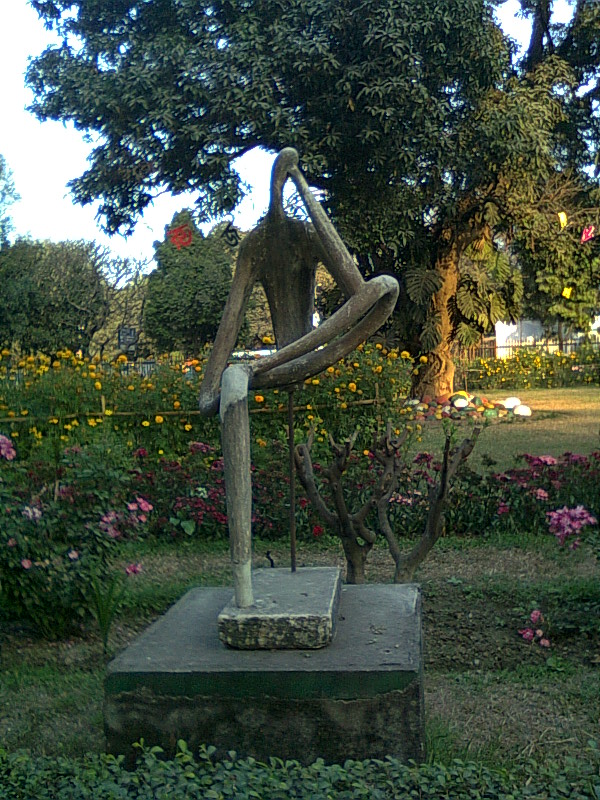
Seated Woman
