= Nazir Ahmed (filmmaker) =

Bengali filmmaker

- Born: c. 1925; Dhaka, Bengal Presidency, British India
- Died: 1 February 1990 (aged 64–65); London, England
- Education: University of Dhaka
- Occupation: Filmmaker

Nazir Ahmed (1925 – 1 February 1990) was a Bengali filmmaker. He served as the founding executive director of East Pakistan Film Development Corporation (later Bangladesh Film Development Corporation) during 1957–1962.

== Background ==
Ahmed was born at 17 Ashik Lane, Islampur neighborhood in Old Dhaka. Ahmed's grandfather Mirza Hayat performed as an actor for the Nawabs of Dhaka. His father, Mirza Fakir and uncle, Mirza Kader were actors as well. Ahmed's elder brother, Abu Naser Ahmed, was one of the founders of East Bengal Film Association in 1952. His younger brother, Hamidur Rahman, an artist, who later was the architect of Shaheed Minar, Dhaka.

Ahmed completed his bachelor's from the University of Dhaka in 1942.

== Career ==
Ahmed was the creator of In Our Midst (1947), the first documentary film ever produced in Dhaka. The documentary was focused on the 10-day Dhaka visit of the then Governor-General of Pakistan, Muhammad Ali Jinnah. Ahmed worked for BBC in London during 1948–1952. He went on make other documentary films including Salamat, Wheel and 1955. He was the writer of the story and dialogues for the 1960 film Asiya.

Ahmed directed a film Notun Diganta (1968) and served as the cinematographer of Bindu Theke Britto (1970).

== Filmography ==
- In Our Midst (1947) (documentary)
- Salamat
- Wheel
- 1955
- Asiya (1960) (writer)
- Notun Diganta (1968) (director)
- Bindu Theke Britto (1970) (cinematographer)

== Awards ==
- Bachsas (Bangladesh Cine-Journalists' Association) Award - 1983
