= Asiya (film) =

1960 Pakistani film

Aseeya
- Bengali: আসিয়া
- Directed by: Fateh Lohani
- Written by: Nazir Ahmed
- Screenplay by: Fateh Lohani
- Story by: Nazir Ahmed
- Produced by: Fateh Lohani
- Starring: Sumita Devi; Shahid; Kazi Khalek; Ranen Kushari; Bhobesh Mukharji; Probir Kumar
- Cinematography: Kazi Misbah Uzzaman
- Edited by: Ashu Ghosh
- Music by: Samar Das
- Production company: Purbani Chitro
- Distributed by: Pakistan Film Institute
- Release date: 1960
- Country: Pakistan
- Language: Bengali

Aseeya is a Pakistani Bengali drama film that was released in 1960. The film was produced and directed by Fateh Lohani. Story and dialogue by Nazir Hossain and also screenplay by Fateh Lohani. The film was produced in the banner of Purbani Chitro and produced by Pakistan Film Institute. Sumita Devi starred in the main role and Shaheed, Kazi Khalek, Prabir Kumar, Bhavesh Mukherjee also played in the supporting role.

The film won the president award given by the government of Pakistan as the best Bengali film category.

== Cast ==
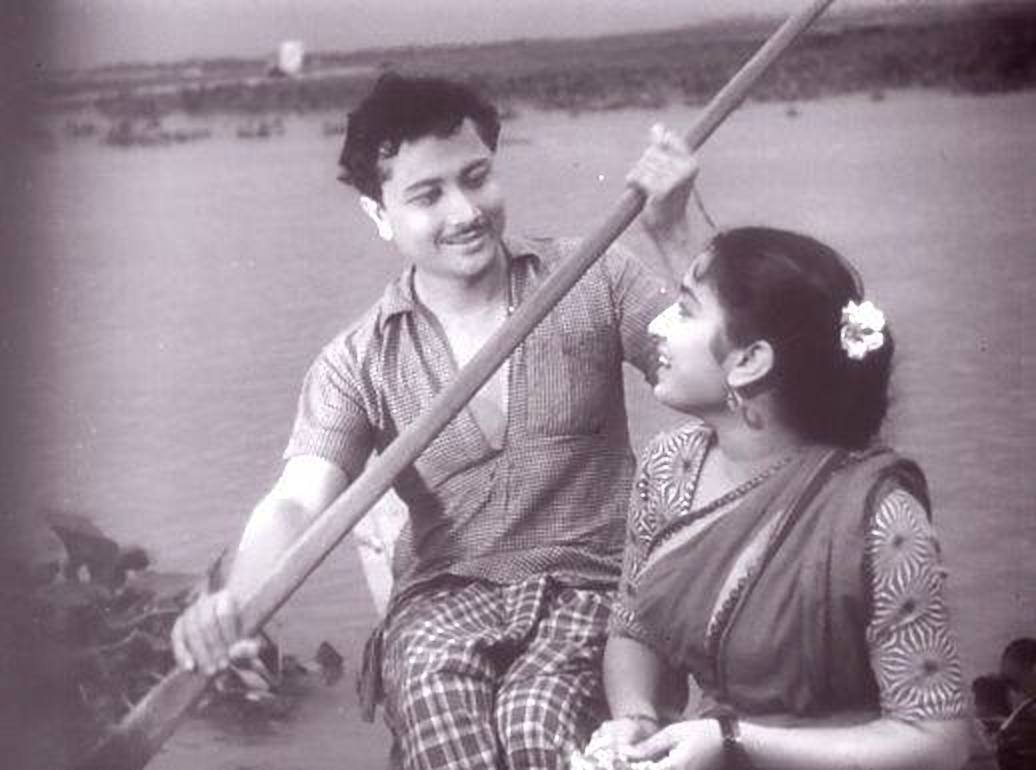
Sumita Devi and Shahid in a scene.

- Sumita Devi – Asiya
- Shahid – Mosu Mia
- Rubi – young Asiya
- Mujahidul Islam Selim – young Mosu
- Kazi Khalek – Shikder Saheb
- Ranen Kushari – Tajiddi
- Bhavesh Mukherjee – Maniruddi, father of Asiya
- Prabir Kumar
- Madhuri Chattopadhyay
- Sitara Begum – mother of Asiya
- Shirin Begum – Bhairavi
- Misbah
- Sona Mia
- Cannon
- Shabnam – Dancer
- Kamal Lohani – Dancer
- Jacob – dancer
- Altamas – dancer
- Anwar – dancer

== Awards ==
President award

- Best Bengali Film – Aseeya – Won
