= Shaheed Minar, Dhaka =

Coordinates: 23°43′38″N 90°23′48″E

Central Shaheed Minar
- কেন্দ্রীয় শহিদ মিনার
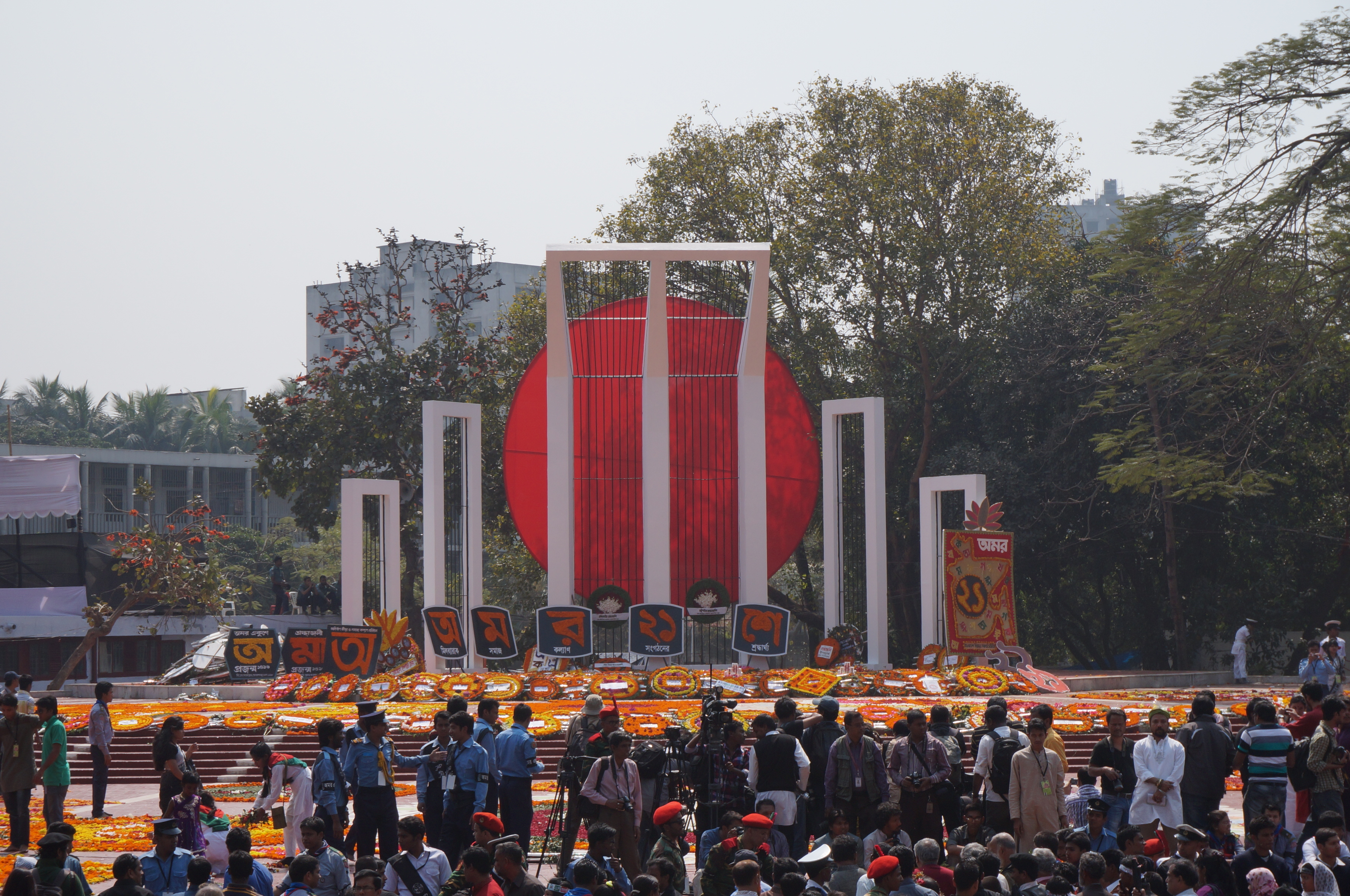
- Shaheed Minar in 2014
- Interactive map of the Central Shaheed Minar area

General information
- Status: Completed
- Type: Monument
- Architectural style: Modern
- Location: University of Dhaka, Dhaka, Bangladesh, Dhaka University area and adjacent to Dhaka Medical College Hospital

Height
- Height: 14 m (46 ft)

Design and construction
- Architects: Hamidur Rahman; Novera Ahmed

The Shaheed Minar (Bengali: শহীদ মিনার romanised: 'Shohid Minar' lit. 'The Martyr Tower') is a national monument in Dhaka, Bangladesh, established to commemorate those killed during the Bengali language movement demonstrations of 1952 in then East Pakistan.

On 21 and 22 February 1952, students from Dhaka University and Dhaka Medical College and political activists were killed when the Pakistani police force opened fire on Bengali protesters who were demanding official status for their native language, Bengali. The massacre occurred near Dhaka Medical College and Ramna Park in Dhaka. A makeshift monument was erected on 23 February by students of Dhaka Medical College and other educational institutions, but soon demolished on 26 February by the police force.

The Language Movement gained momentum, and after a long struggle, Bengali gained official status in Pakistan (with Urdu) in 1956. To commemorate the dead, the Shaheed Minar was designed and built by Bangladeshi sculptors Hamidur Rahman and Novera Ahmed. Construction was delayed under martial law, but the monument was completed in 1963. It remained standing until the Bangladesh Liberation War in 1971, when it was completely demolished during Operation Searchlight. After Bangladesh gained independence later that year, it was rebuilt. It was expanded in 1983.

National, mourning, cultural and other activities are held each year on 21 February (Ekushey February) to mark Language Movement Day or Shaheed Dibas (Martyrs' Day), centred on the Shaheed Minar. Since 2000, 21 February is also recognised as International Mother Language Day.

== Location ==
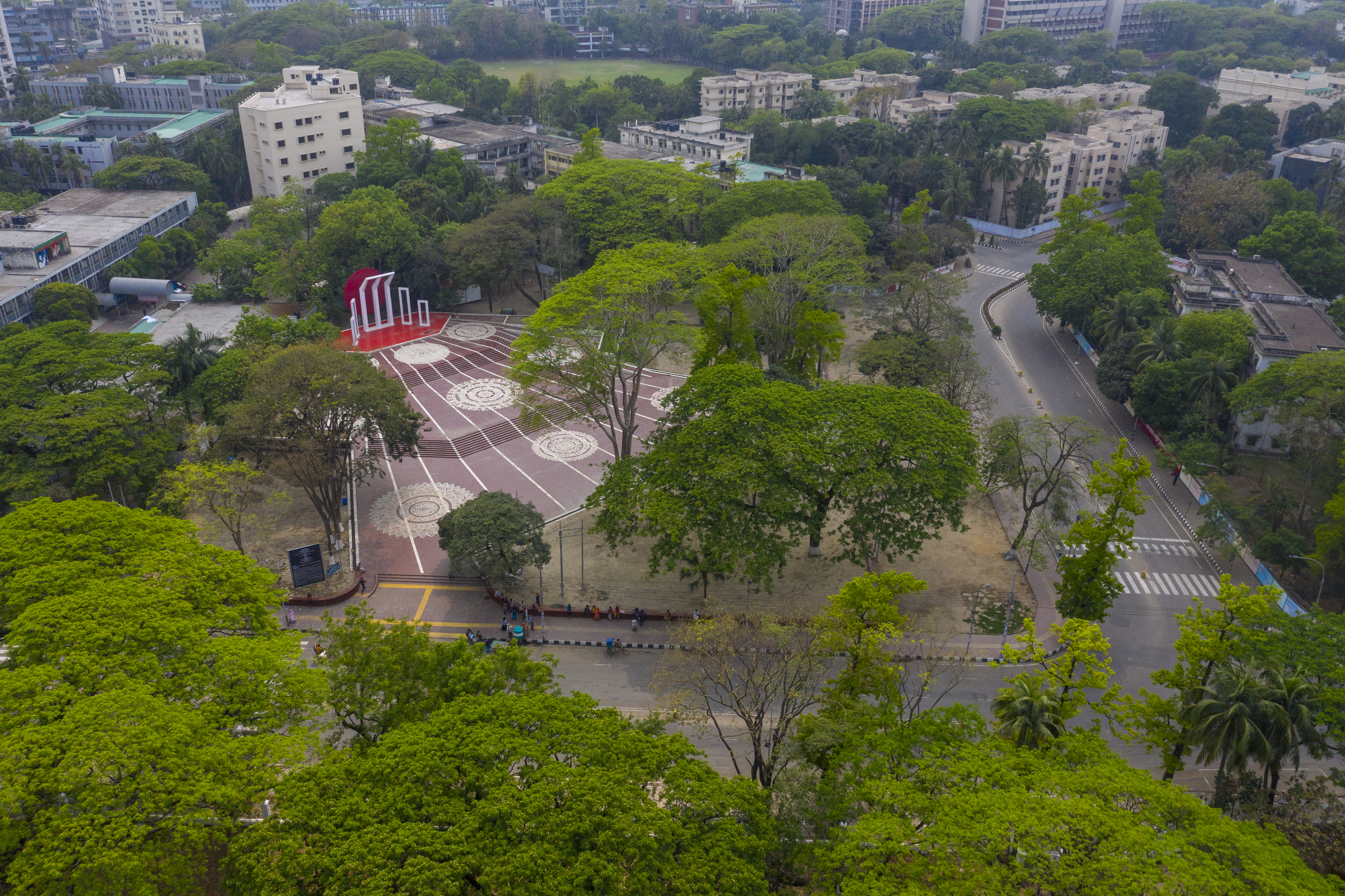
Aerial view of Shaheed Minar and its area

The Shaheed Minar is situated near Dhaka Medical College Hospital and in the Dhaka University area. It is adjacent to the Mathematics Department of Dhaka University.

== History ==
=== 1952–1971 ===
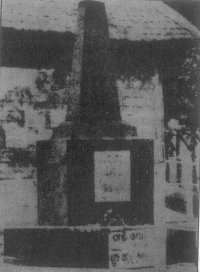
Shaheed Minar, built on 23 February 1952. It was demolished by Pakistan Police and Army three days later.

The first Shaheed Minar was built immediately after the events of 21–22 February 1952. According to Dr. Sayeed Haider, the main planner and the designer of the first Shaheed Minar, the decision to build it was first made by the students of Dhaka Medical College. Shaheed Minar is situated near Dhaka Medical College Hospital and in the Dhaka University area. It is adjacent to the Mathematics department of Dhaka University. It is only 0.5 kilometres (0.3 mi) away from Shahbag and 0.25 km (0.16 mi) distant from Chankharpul. Shaheed Minar is an outstanding monument of Bangladesh. It was built to tribute the martyrs who given up their life for language. The main incident had been occurring inside of Dhaka medical college hospital. So a decision was taken to build a memorial adjacent to DMCH. The planning started at midnight on 22 February, and the work started the next day. This Minar was sponsored by Pearu Sardar, one of the old Dhaka panchayet sardars, when some of the students asked his help at midnight of 22 February, to contribute the raw materials needed to build the monument. Although curfew was in place, students started building the Minar in the afternoon of 23 February. They worked through the night and finished it at dawn. A hand written paper was attached to the Minar with "Shaheed Smritistombho" written on it. The original Minar was on a base measuring 10.5 feet (3.2 m). The Minar was inaugurated by the father of Shafiur Rahman, Molvi. Mahabubur Rahman, who was killed during the massacre. It was demolished on 26 February by the police and Pakistani Army. Smaller versions of the memorial were built in other places. The first Shaheed Minar monument was then destroyed four days after its erection, on February 26, 1952, by the Pakistani Police and Army. A signboard placed by the police force on top of the rubble from the Minar read "mosque".

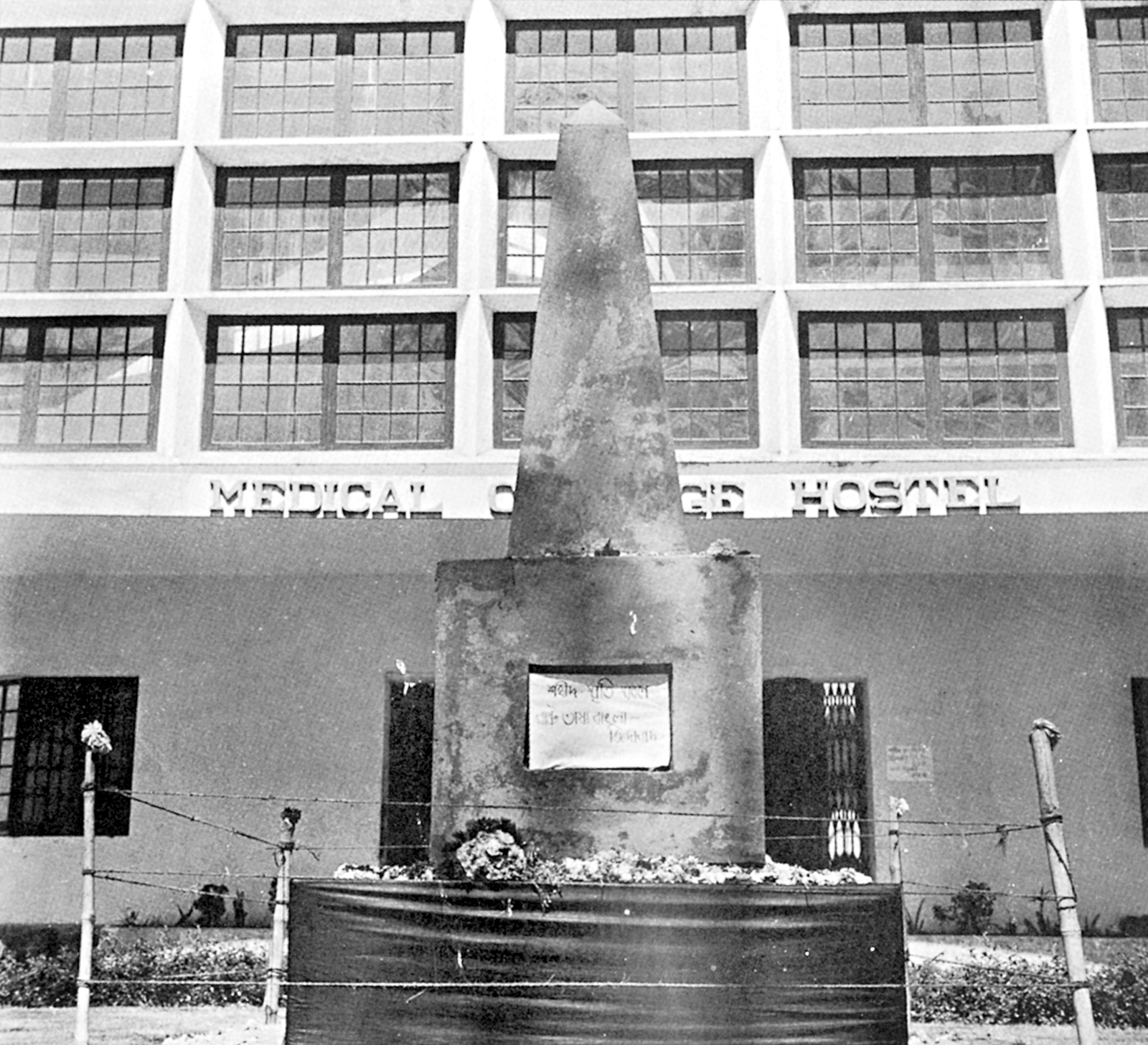
The second Shaheed Minar, 21 February 1954

Two years after the first monument was destroyed by the then police force, a new Shaheed Minar (Monument of Martyrs) was constructed in 1954 at the same place, to commemorate the protesters who lost their lives. This Minar was inaugurated by the then Professor of Dhaka University and the pioneer and prominent cultural and literary personality Natyaguru Nurul Momen. Work on a larger monument designed by the architect Hamidur Rahman began in 1957 with the support of the United Front government. Following the formation of the provincial government by the United Front in April 1954, the anniversary of 21 February was declared a holiday and it became possible to construct the new monument. A foundation stone was laid in 1956, and a government committee chaired by University of Dhaka Vice-Chancellor Dr Mahmud Husain and including the principal of the Fine College of Arts, Zainul Abedin, was constituted to plan, design, and approve the monument's construction. The committee approved the design of sculptor Hamidur Rahman, followed by the construction of Shaheed Minar, starting in 1957. Hamidur Rahman's model was a huge complex on a large area of land in the yard of Dhaka Medical College Hostel. The enormous design included a half-circular column to symbolise the mother with her fallen sons standing on the monument's central dais. Yellow and deep blue pieces of stained glass, symbolising eyes reflecting the sun, were also to be placed in the columns. The marble floor was designed to reflect the moving shadows of the columns. The basement of the Minar also included a 1,500-square-foot (140 m^{2}) fresco depicting the history of the language movement. A railing decorated with Bengali alphabet was to be constructed in front. Two footmarks coloured red and black, indicating the two opposite forces, were also in the design. Besides this a museum and a library were also included in Hamidur Rahman's design. A fountain shaped like an eye was also to be constructed. Rahman specifically designed the materials of the monument to withstand the area's tropical climate.

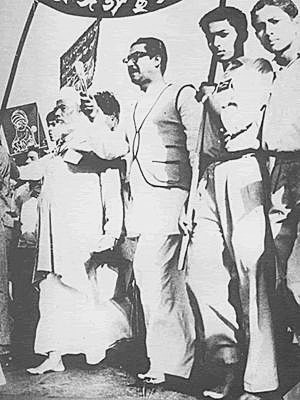
Maulana Abdul Hamid khan Bhasani and Sheikh Mujibur Rahman marching barefoot to pay tribute at Shaheed Minar, 21 February 1954

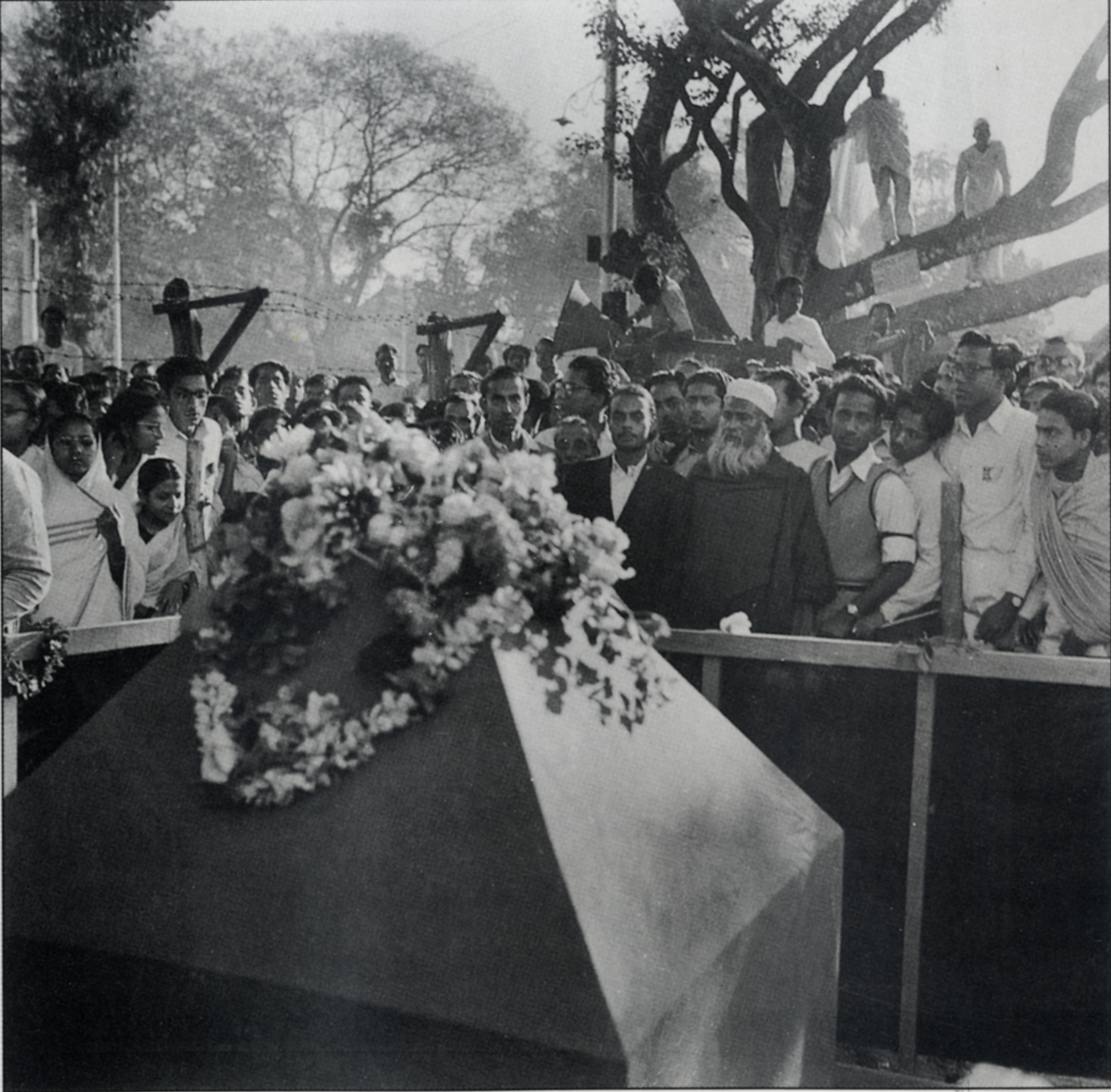
Maulana Bhashani after laying the foundation stone for Shaheed Minar, 21 February 1956

Construction started in November 1957, under the supervision of Hamidur Rahman and Novera Ahmed. Most of the work, including the basement, platform, some of the columns with the rails, footprints and some of the murals were also finished when martial law was declared in the area, and the construction was forced to a halt. Construction work was completed in 1963, leaving much of Fatamatuj's design unfinished. It was inaugurated on 21 February 1963, by the mother of Abul Barkat, Hasina Begum. The Minar was severely damaged by the Pakistan Army during the Bangladesh Liberation War in 1971. The columns were destroyed on the night of the commencement of the genocide, 25 March 1971. The Pakistani Army crushed the Minar and placed over the rubble a signboard reading "Mosque".

=== 1972–present ===
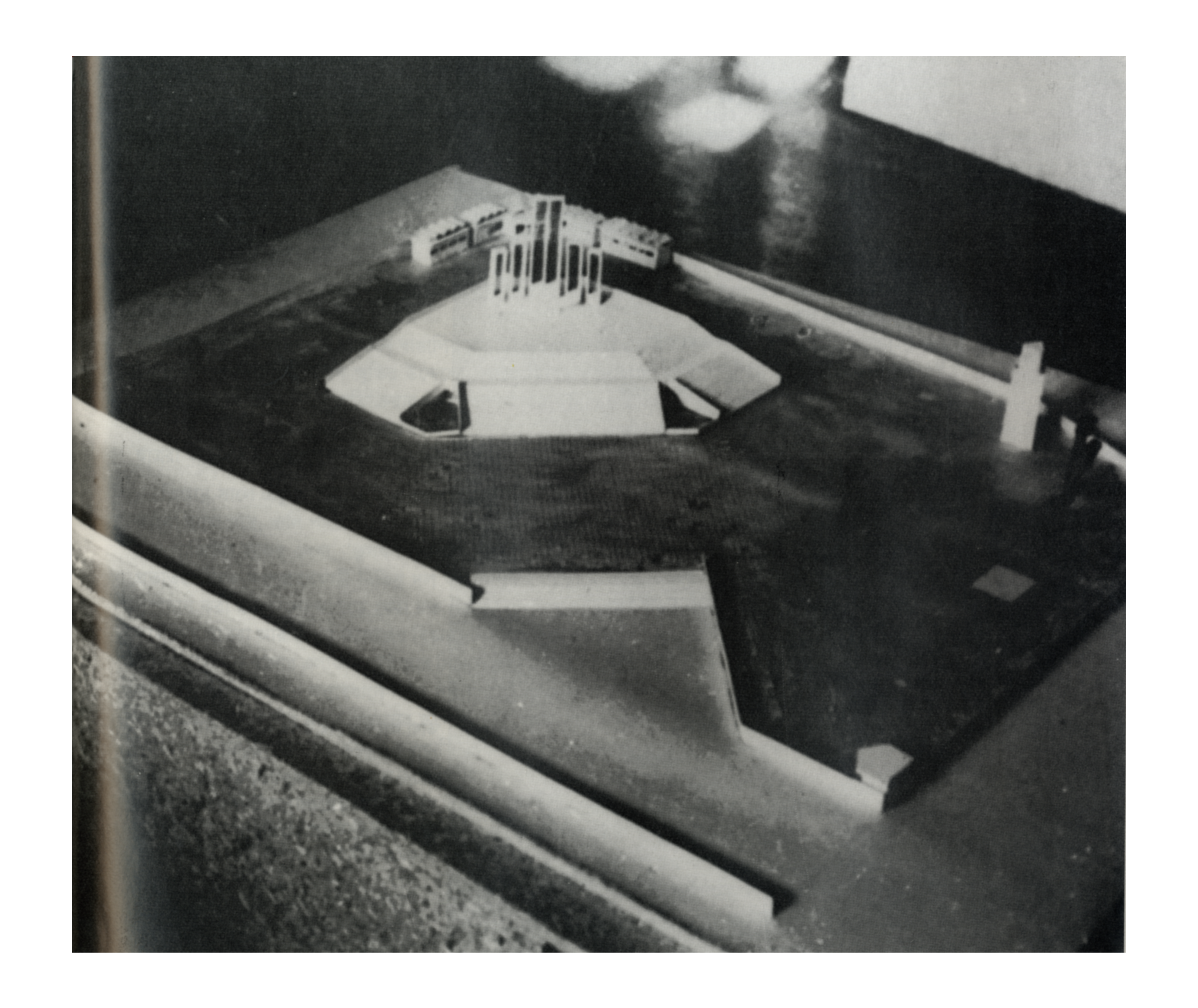
Planning & design of new Shaheed Minar (martyrs' monument), artist Hamidur Rahman and architect Zafar, in place of the old one destroyed by Pakistan force.

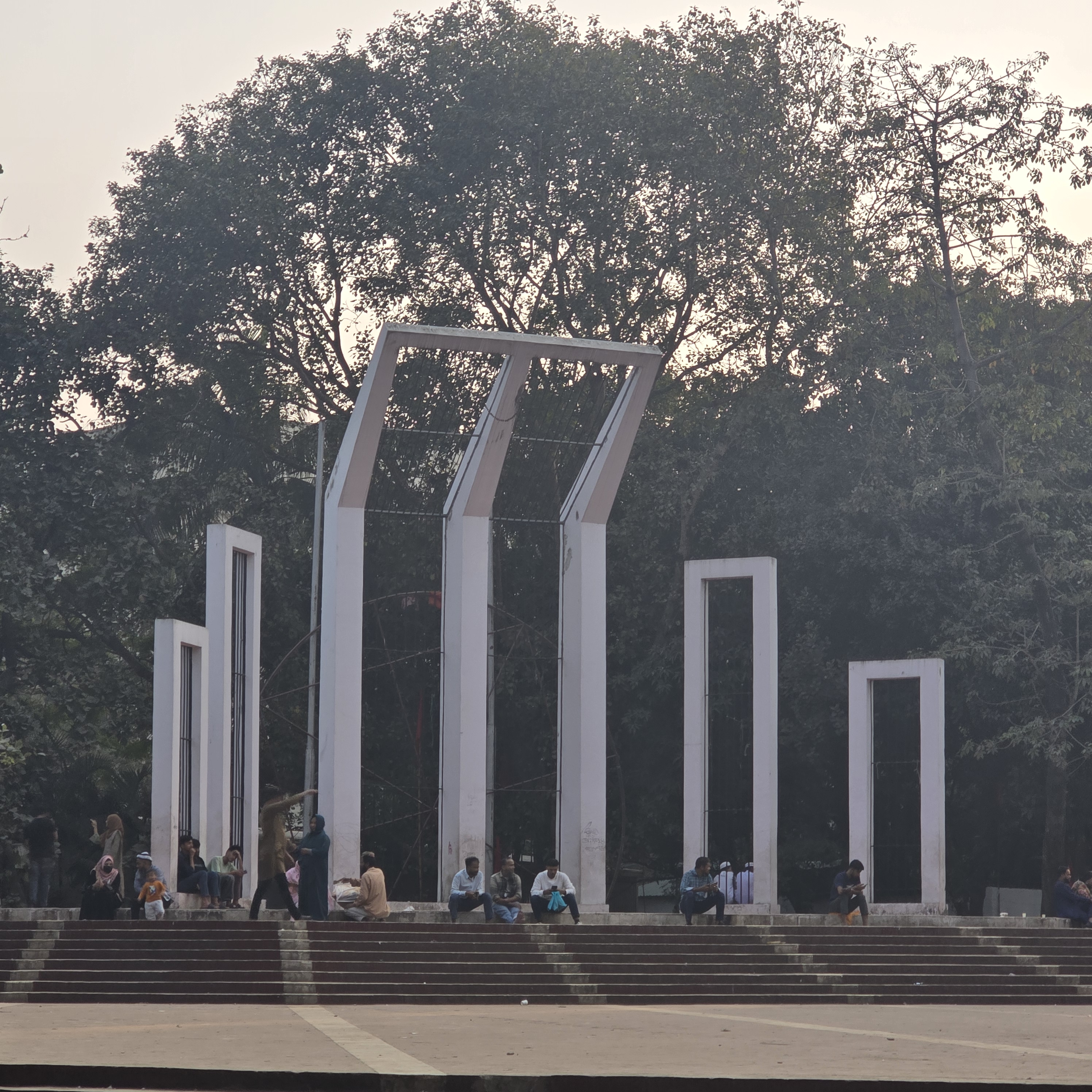
Shaheed Minar in 2026

In 1972, a committee headed by the then president Abu Sayeed Chowdhury was formed and renovation work began. The original sketch was ignored, while the Construction and Building Directorate followed the 1963 design. The construction went quickly, according to a modified design from 1963. The murals destroyed by the Pakistani army were not restored and the basement was sealed off. Hamidur Rahman's original design was not approved by the directorate in the renovation work. In the mid-eighties, the monument underwent further renovation under the supervision of the then Department of Architecture chief architect SHM Abul Bashar, which extended the area of the Shaheed Minar premises, giving it a square shape from a triangular one. Quarters concerned demanded proper implementation of the design by Hamidur Rahman with the help of sculptor Novera Ahmed and Danish architect Gean Deleuran. ASM Ismail said that because of the extension, two entrances to the basement murals were permanently closed, and after remaining in an abandoned state for 15 years, the murals had lost much of their gloss. In the 1983 renovation, the original poor materials were lined with marble stone. A museum and library were also featured in the original plan. In August 2010, the High Court issued eight directives for the maintenance and renovation of the Shaheed Minar and asked the Public Works Department to establish a museum and a library on its premises.

== Architecture and significance ==
The enormous design includes a half-circular arrangement of columns to symbolise the mother, with her fallen sons, standing on the monument's central dais, and the red sun shining behind. The Central Shaheed Minar of Dhaka goes up to a height of 14 metres (46 ft) and was made with marble stones. The stairs and barrier are highlighted in white, to create a divine look. The fence on both sides is painted with lines from poems of legendary poets in iron letters. As the visitors enter the monument they will find two statues of the patriots who sacrificed their lives in that heinous police firing of 1952. The marble floor was designed to reveal the moving shadows of the columns. The basement of the Shaheed Minar also included a 1,500-square-foot (140 m^{2}) mural representing the history of the Language Movement.

Hurried repair of the Shaheed Minar resulted in the Minar to be reconstructed incorrectly. The height of the column was shorter and the head bent more than originally planned, and the proportions of different parts of the monument were not properly maintained.

The Language Movement was one of the formidable movements which has come up in the country of Bangladesh, thus the Central Shaheed Minar epitomises efforts to represent the spirit of nationalism and also highlight the importance of the Bengali language in the social and cultural progress of the country. As a result, the Shaheed Minar has a very significant place in the social and cultural mechanism of Bangladesh.

At present, all national, mourning, cultural and other activities held each year, regarding 21 February, have been centred on the Shaheed Minar.

== Replicas and controversy ==
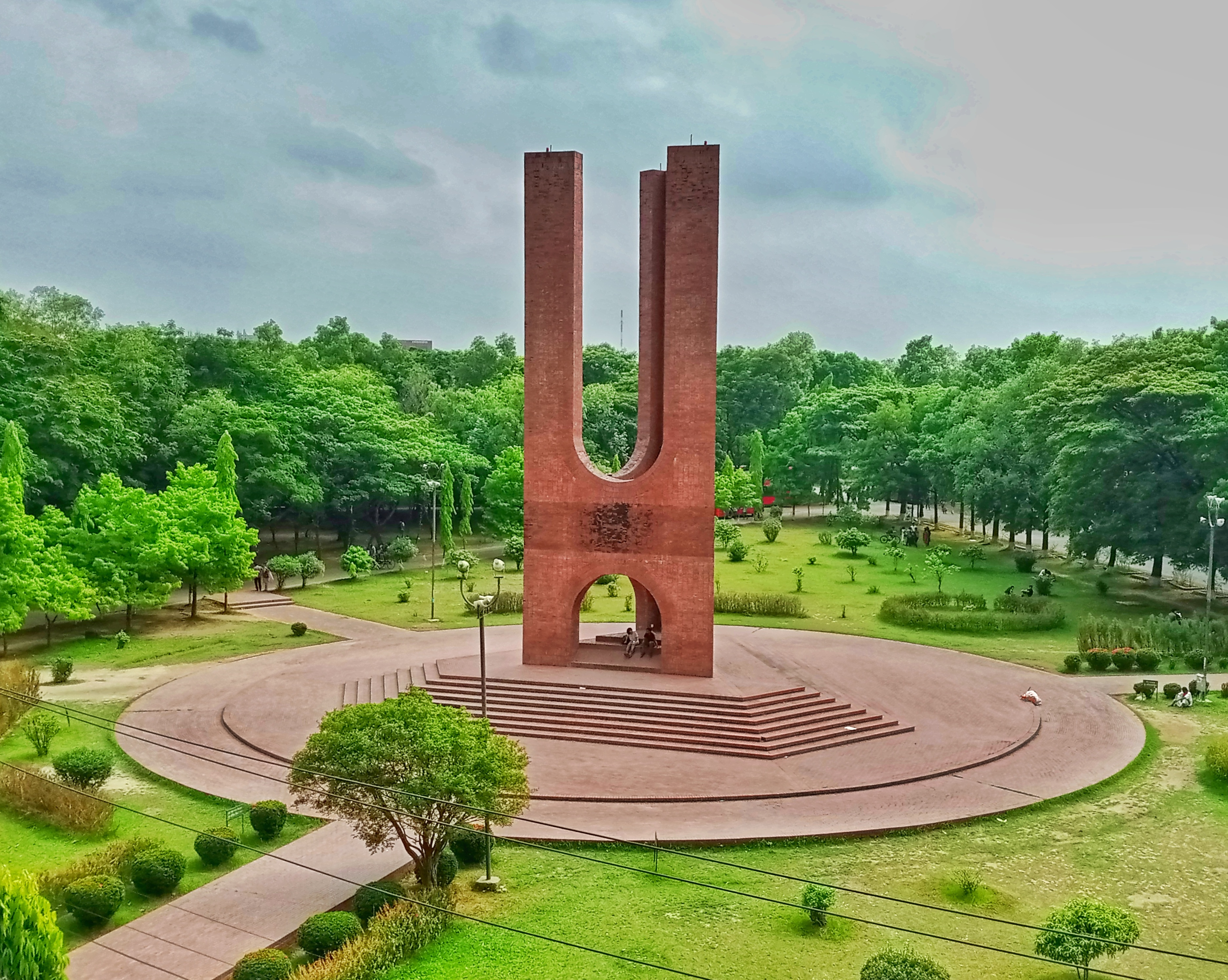
Unusual design of Shaheed Minar in Jahangirnagar University

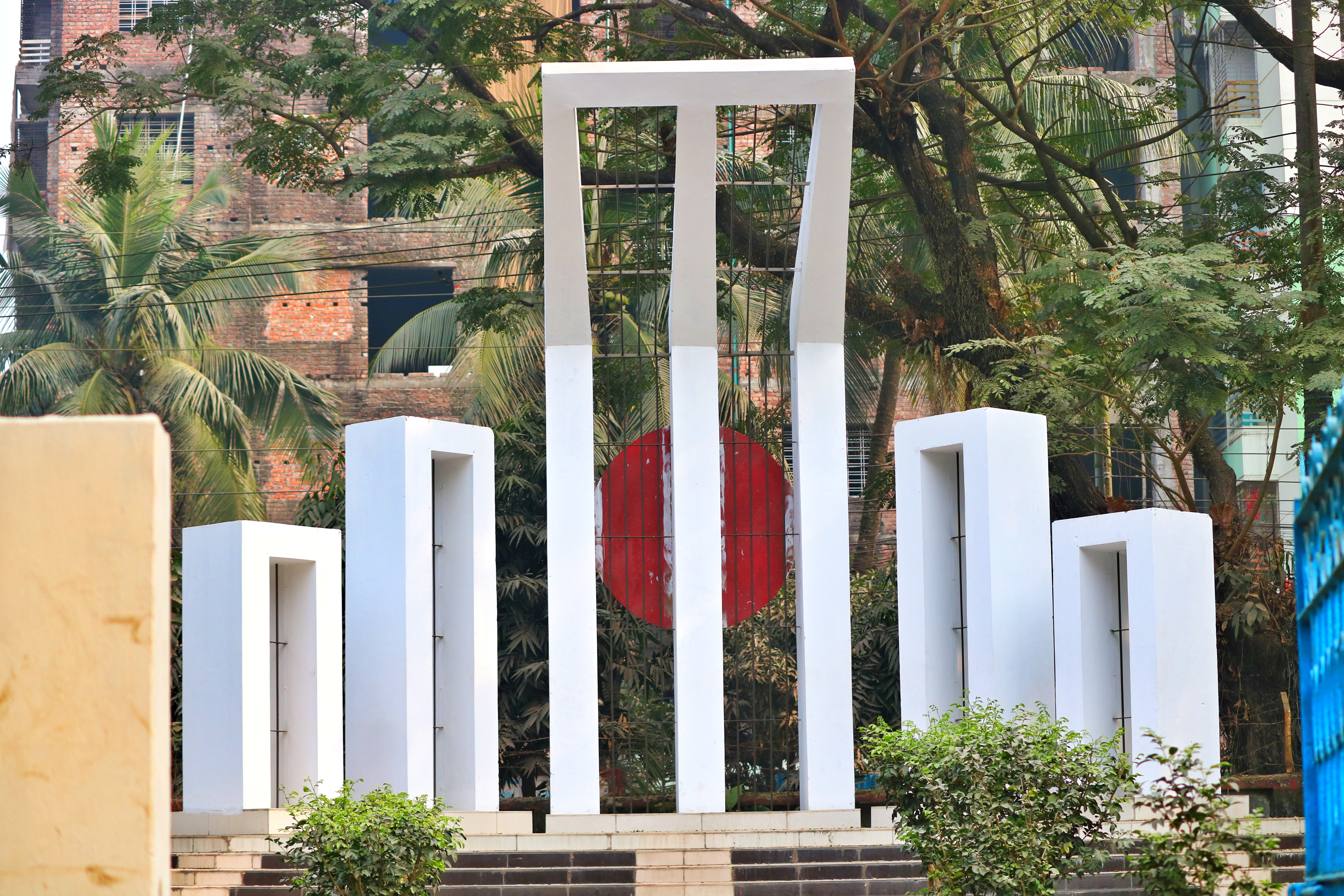
Shaheed Minar at Comilla Zilla School

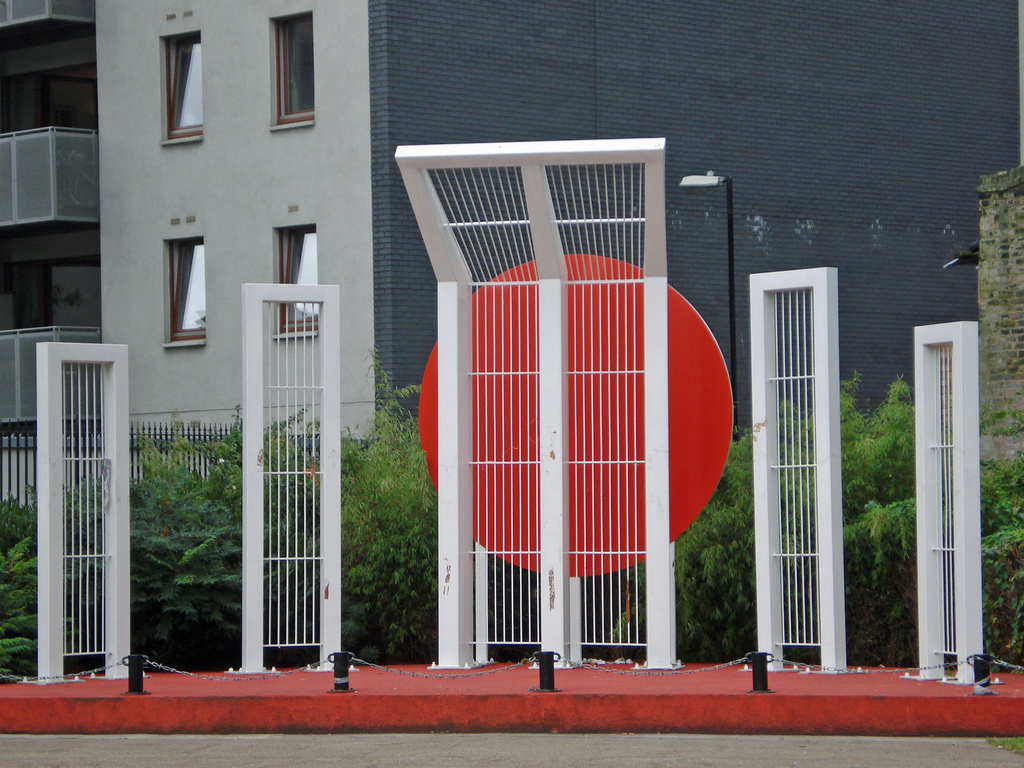
Replica of Shaheed Minar in London

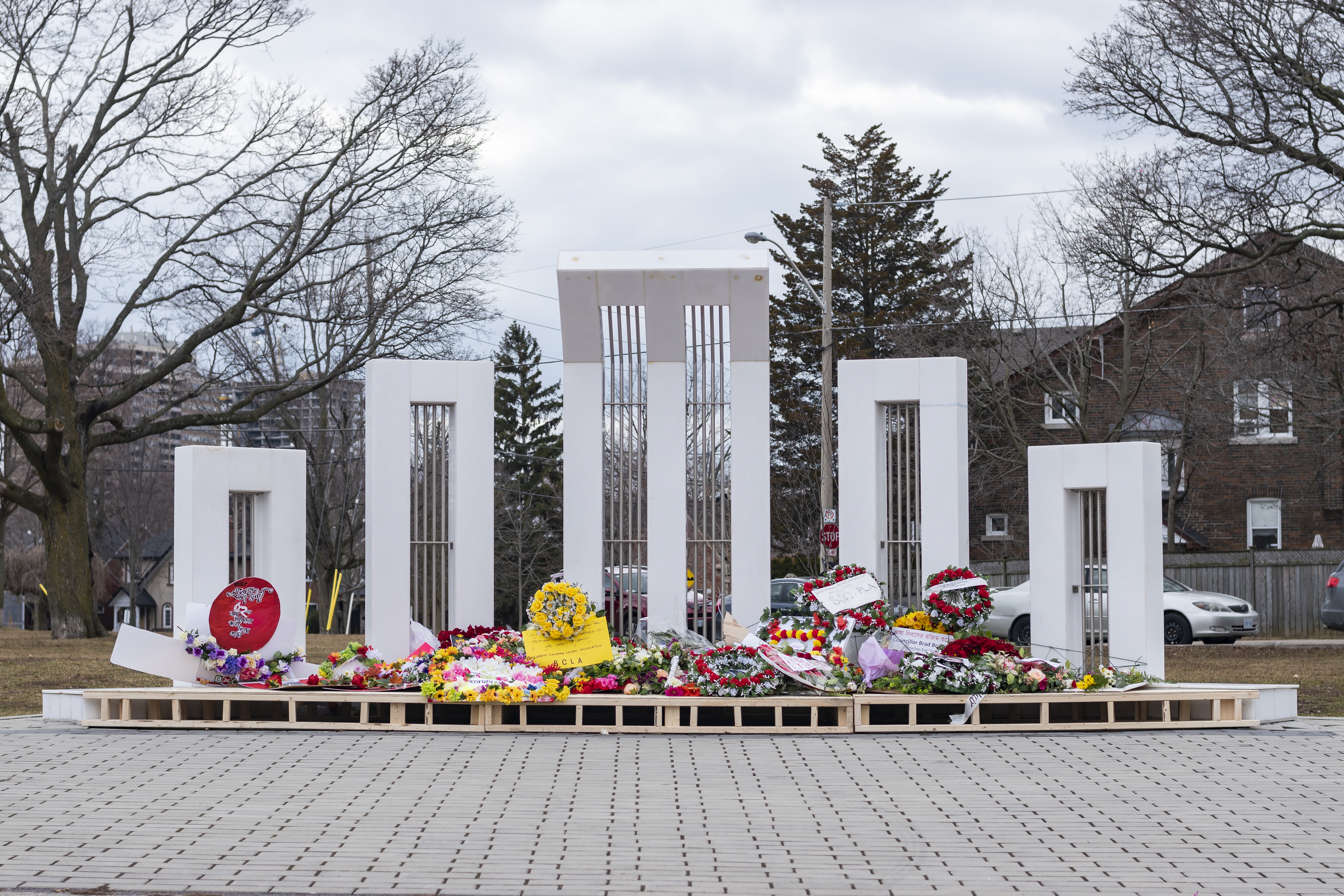
Replica of Shaheed Minar in Toronto

The largest replicas of Shaheed Minar in Bangladesh are located in Barisal and Madaripur. Among them, the foundation stone of the replica located in Barisal was laid by the then president Sheikh Mujibur Rahman in 1972. The replica located at Madaripur was inaugurated in 2021.

Apart from Bangladesh and India, there are at least 100 replicas of Shahid Minar in the world. The replica of Shaheed Minar was first built abroad in 1997 in Oldham, Britain. Replicas were later built in Altab Ali Park in Whitechapel, London and in Luton. There are 4 replicas of Shaheed Minar in West Bengal of which two are located in the city of Kolkata, one was erected in 2005 in Tokyo and another is located in Ashfield Park in Sydney. A replica was opened in Toronto, Canada on 27 November 2021. Another replica was inaugurated in 2023 in Perris, California. A Shaheed Minar (costing 70 thousand euros to build) was inaugurated in Paris on 8 October 2023 (the second one in France, the first was built in Toulouse).

Although there are replicas of Shaheed Minar in different parts of Bangladesh, some of them have a different structure than the original structure, so there has been a lot of controversy about them. In 2014, a Shaheed Minar was constructed at Shahjalal University of Science and Technology. It was criticized for being different from the original design of the Central Shaheed Minar. For the same reason, the Shaheed Minars of various districts including Jagannath University have given rise to criticism. As a result of all this, on 14 June 2022, the High Court issued a rule for the formulation of policies for the construction of Shaheed Minar.

== Gallery ==
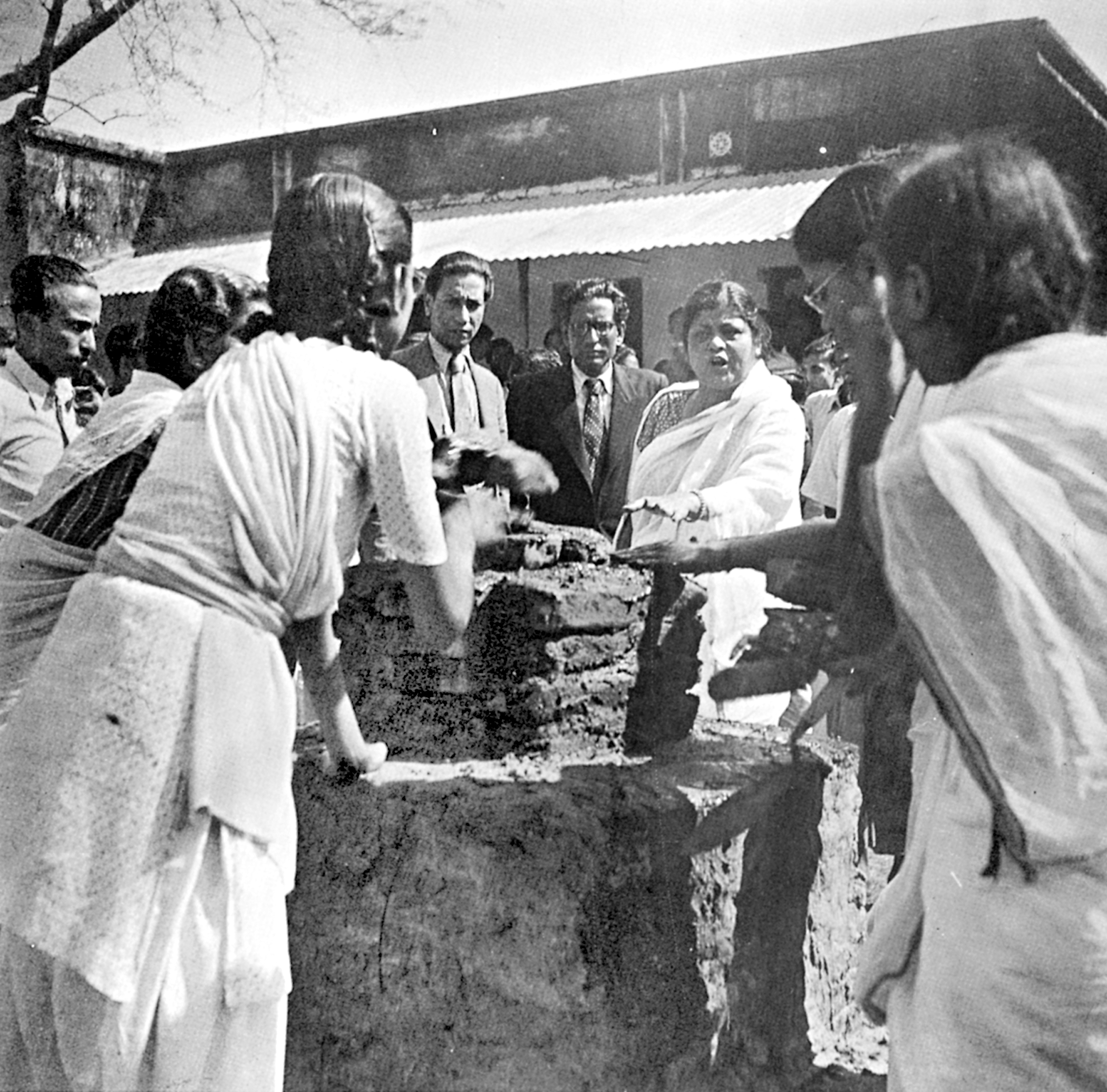
Building a Shaheed Minar at Dhaka College, 1953

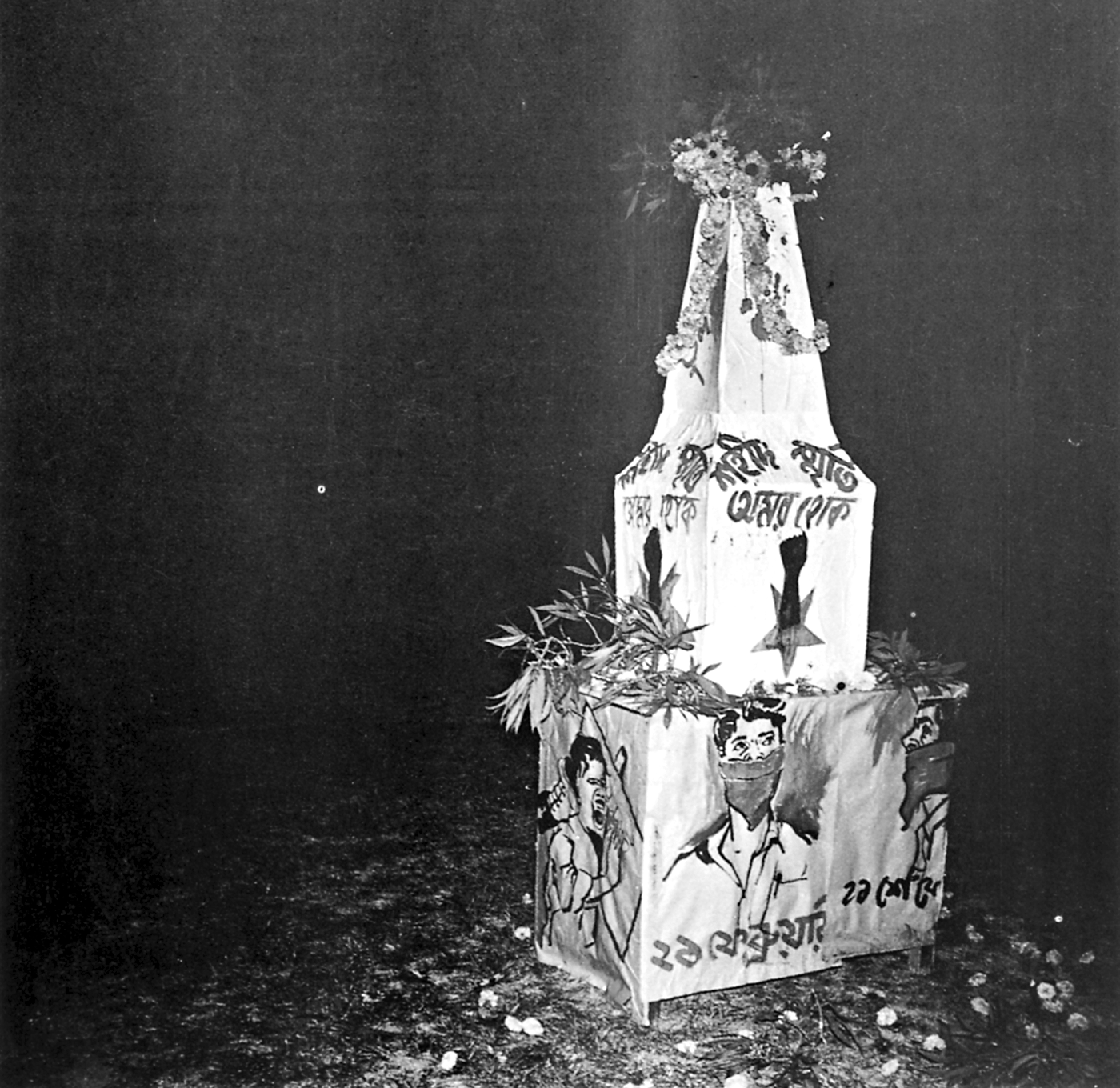
A Shaheed Minar outside Curzon Hall, 1953

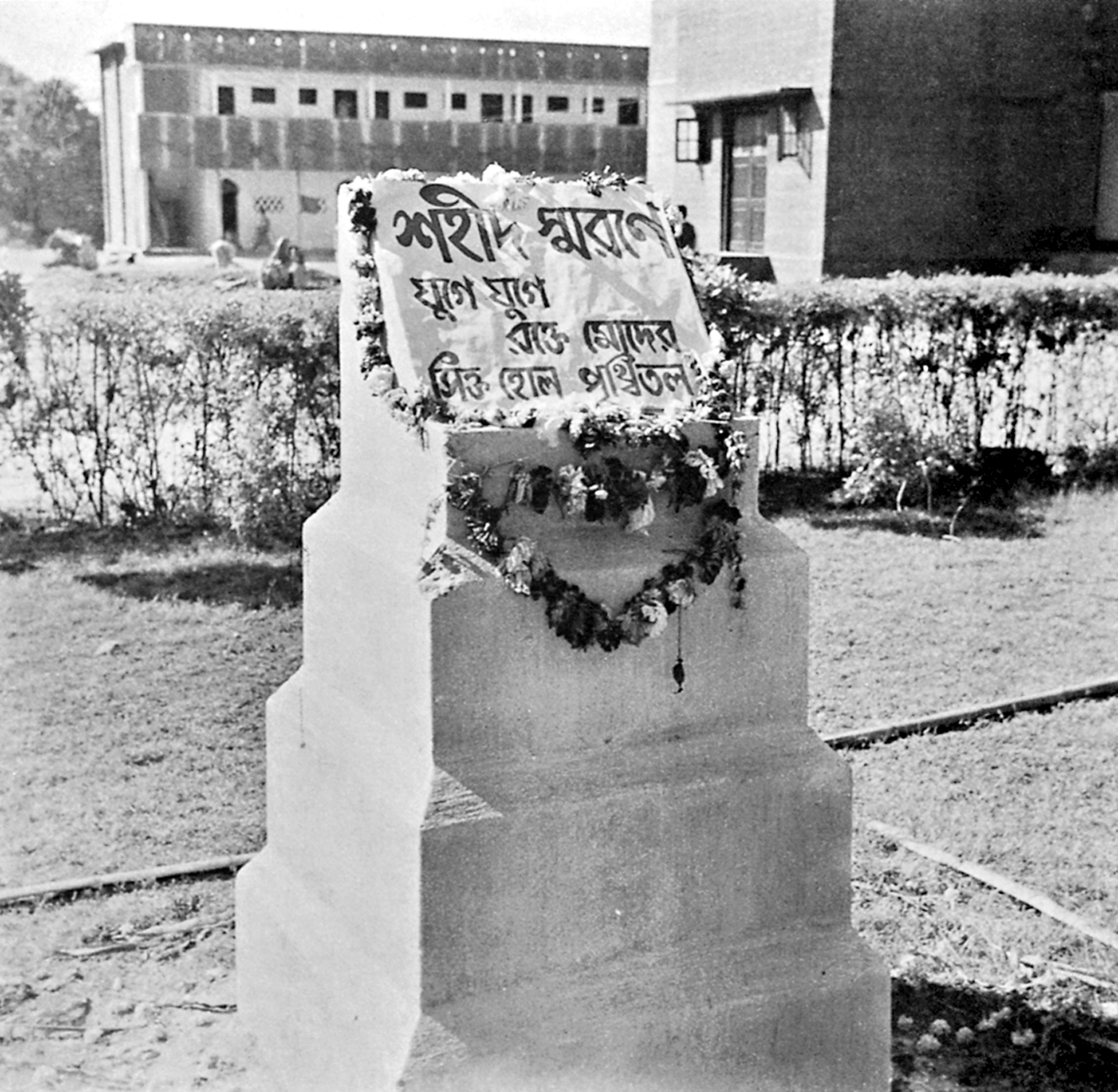
A Shaheed Minar outside the Fine Arts building, University of Dhaka, 1953

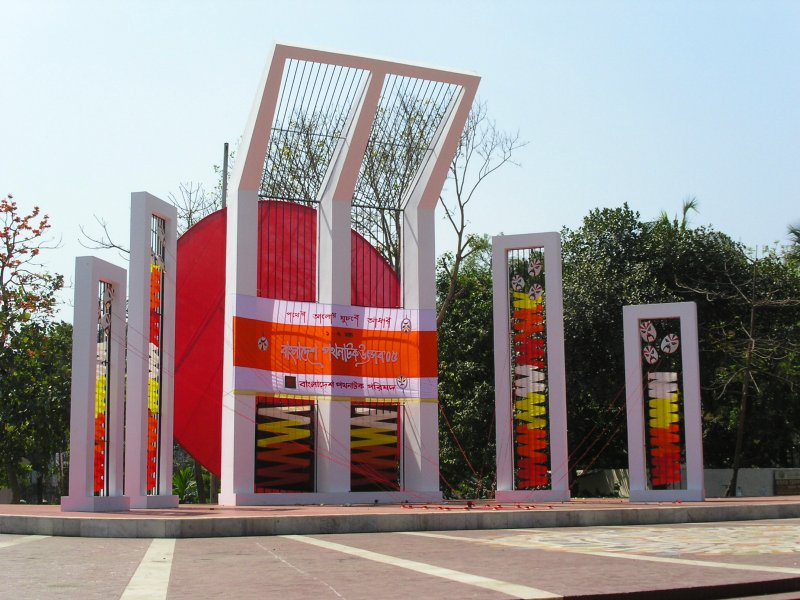
Shaheed Minar of Dhaka, as rebuilt in 1972

== See also ==
- List of national monuments of Bangladesh
