= Hamidur Rahman (artist) =

- হামিদুর রহমান
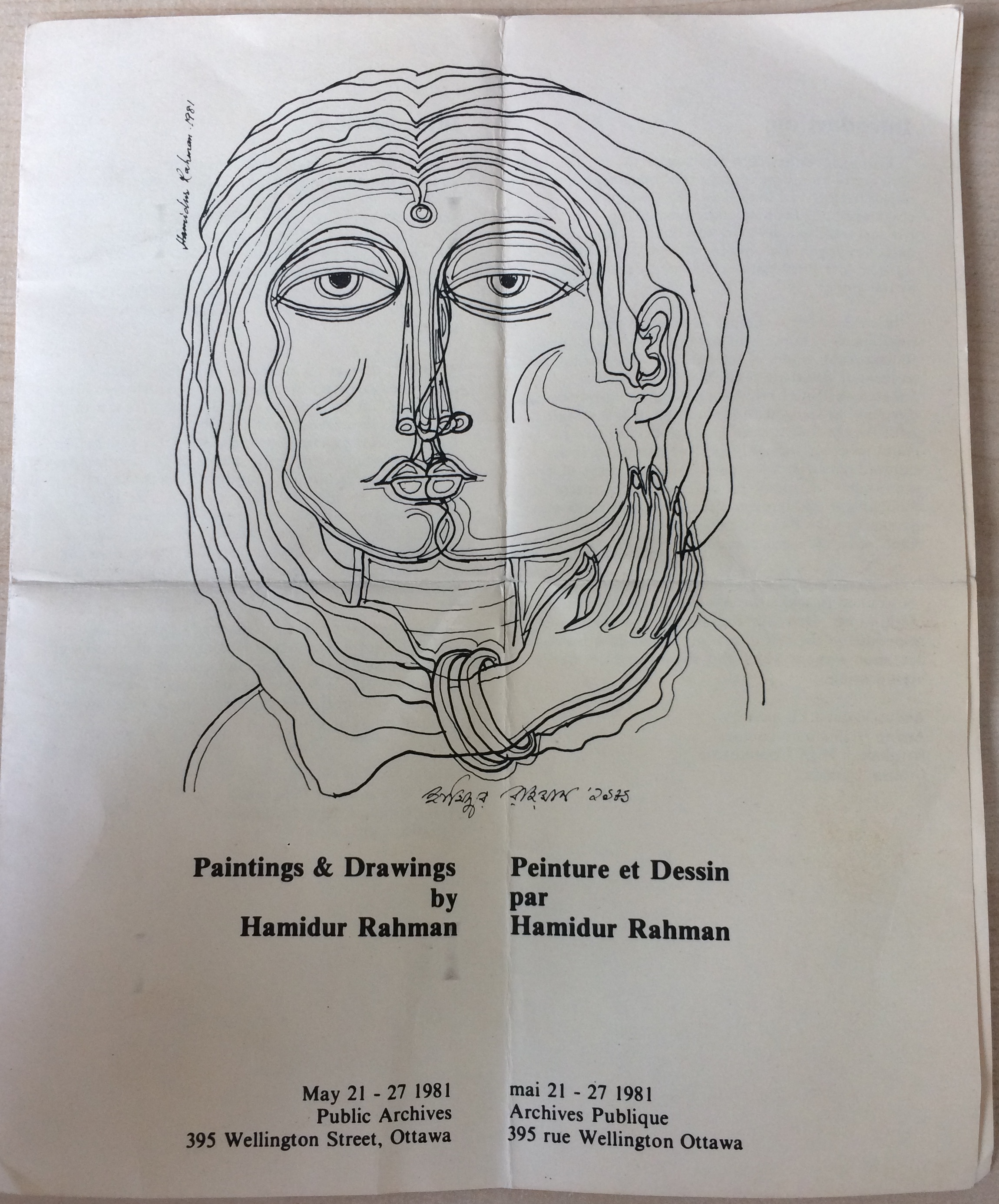
- A painting by Rahman.
- Born: 1928; Dhaka, Bangladesh
- Died: 19 November 1988 (aged 59–60)
- Relatives: Nazir Ahmed (brother); Sayeed Ahmed (brother)
- Awards: Ekushey Padak; 1980

Hamidur Rahman (1928 – 19 November 1988) was a Bangladeshi artist and sculptor. He is best known as the architect of the Shaheed Minar, a national monument in Dhaka, Bangladesh, established to commemorate the martyrs of the Language Movement of 1952.

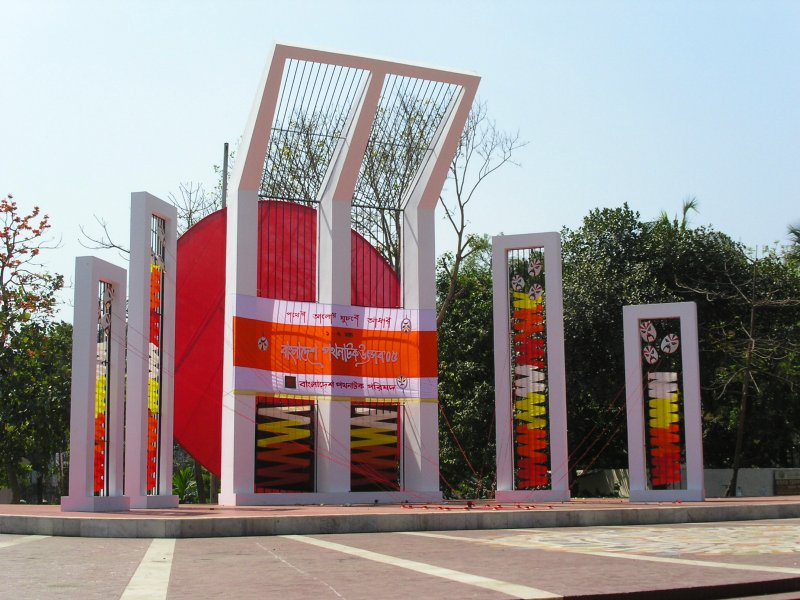
Rahman's notable work, Shaheed Minar, located near Dhaka Medical College.

== Gallery ==
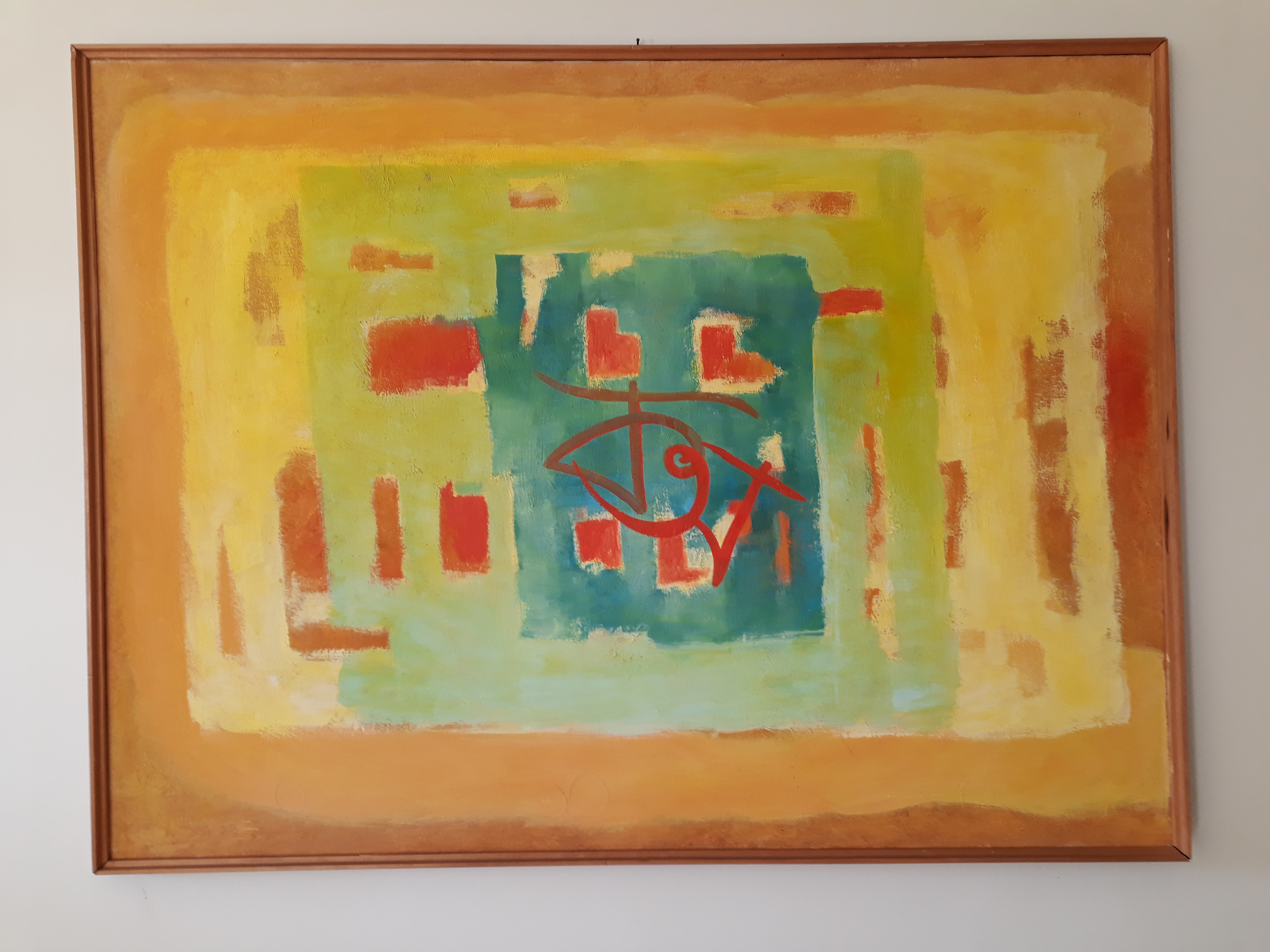
oil painting (c. 1980) by Hamidur Rahman

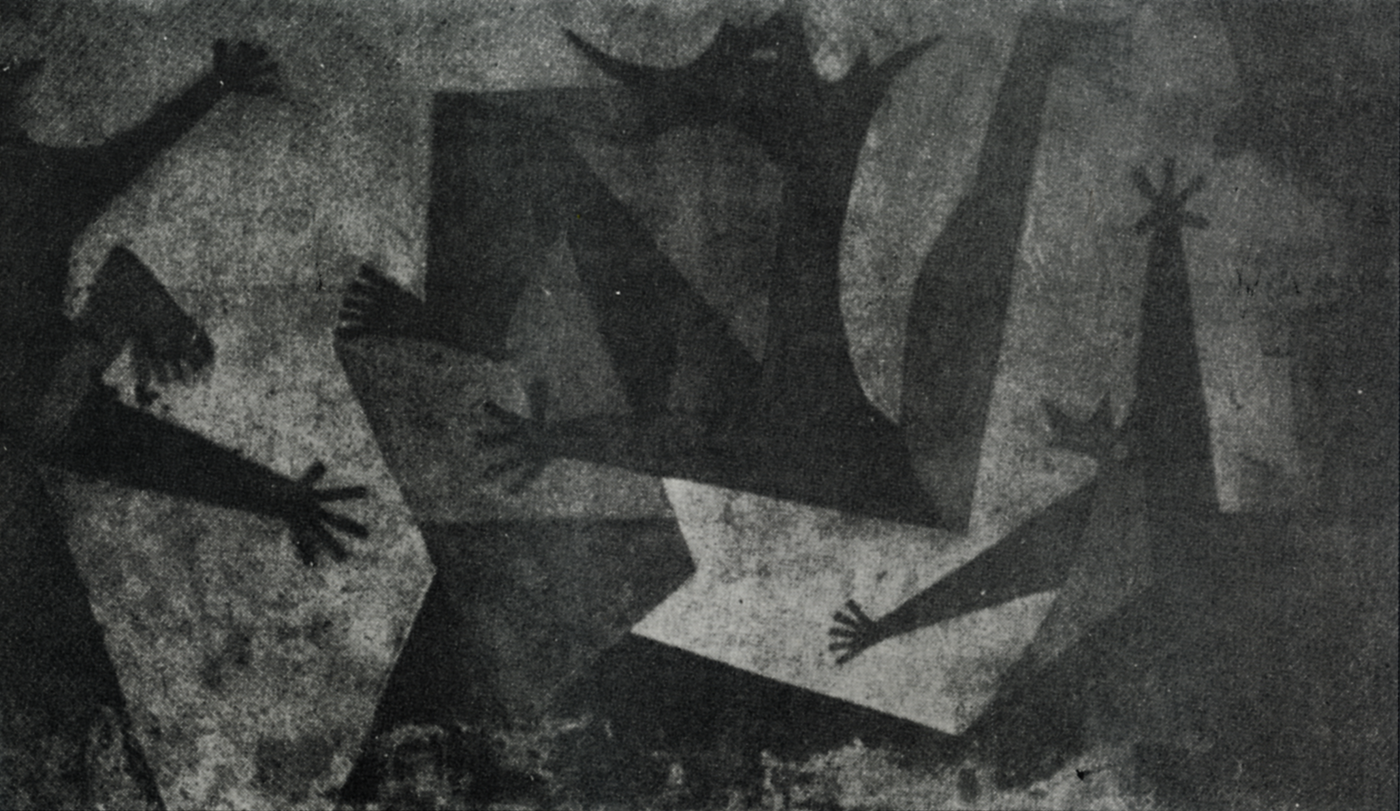
A mural painted by Novera and Rahman

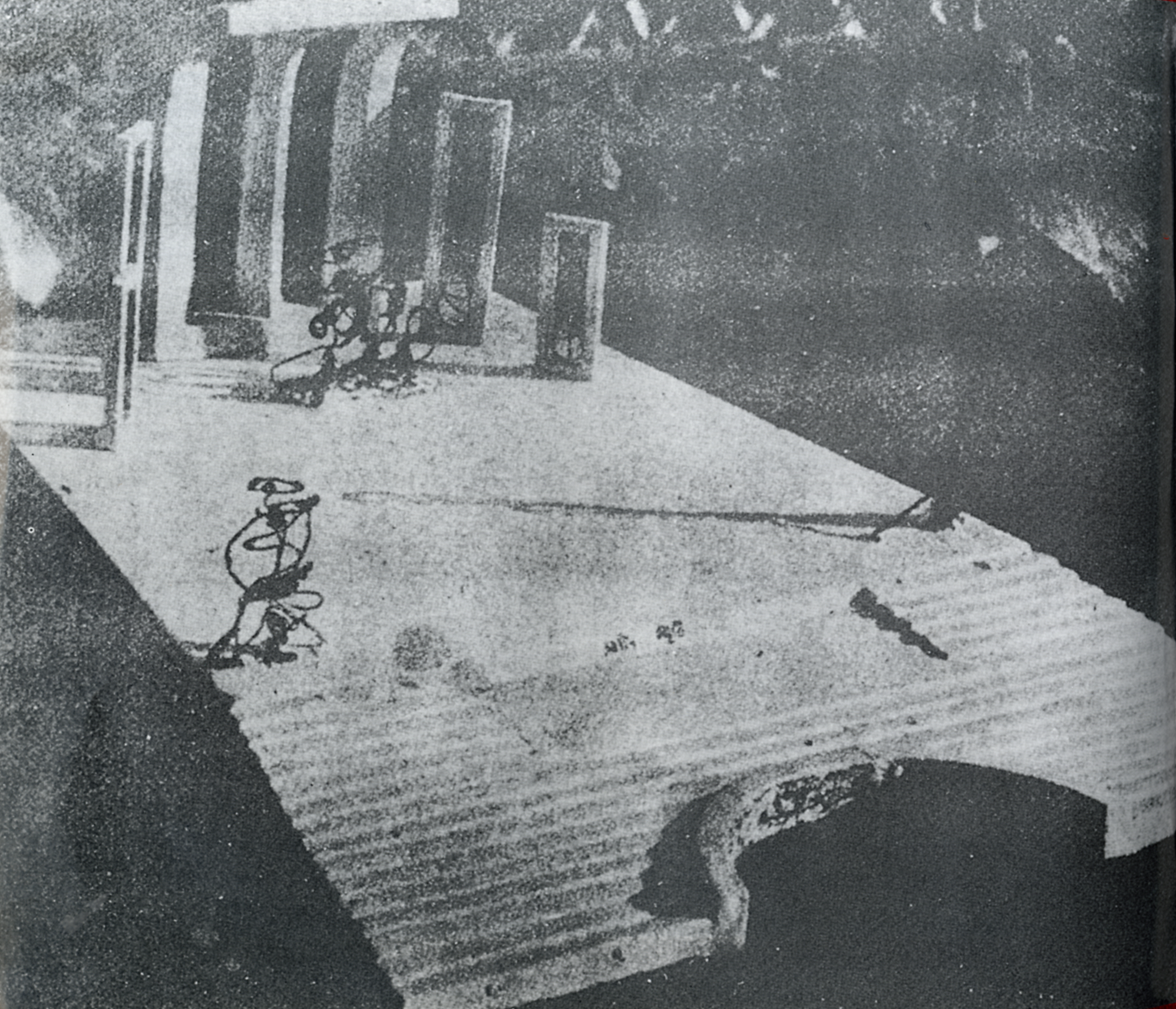
Original plan and model of Shaheed Minar, 1956

== Death ==
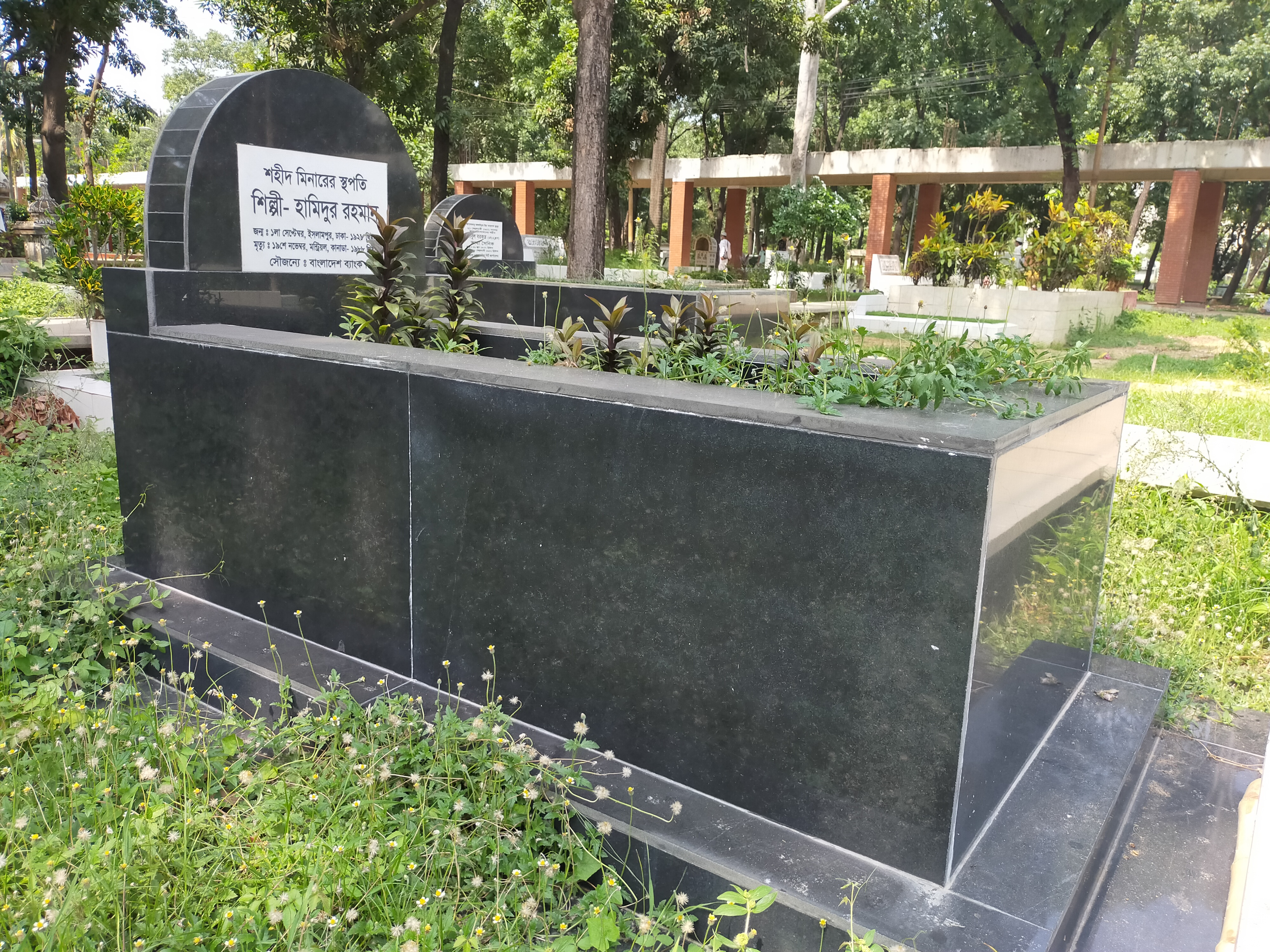
Grave and epitaph of Rahman at Azimpur graveyard, Dhaka

Hamidur Rahman died on 19 November 1988, in Montreal, Canada.
